= Hits (Kylie Minogue album) =

2011 album by Kylie Minogue

Compilation album by Kylie Minogue
- Released: 16 March 2011
- Recorded: 1999–2010
- Length: 51:08
- Label: EMI Music Japan
- Producers: Babydaddy; Cutfather; Daniel Davidsen; Rob Davis; Cathy Dennis; Mike Duffy; Jim Eliot; Julian Gallagher; Greg Kurstin; Stuart Price; Lucas Secon; Damon Sharpe; Jake Shears; Mike Spencer; Graham Stack; Richard Stannard; Mima Stilwell; Stock Aitken Waterman; Sunnyroads; Mark Taylor; Peter Wallevik; Yasutaka Nakata

Kylie Minogue chronology
A Kylie Christmas (2010)	Hits (2011)	The Albums 2000–2010 (2011)

Hits is a 2011 compilation album by Australian recording artist Kylie Minogue. It was released solely in Japan, Hong Kong, Thailand and the Philippines by EMI. The compilation contains songs from Light Years (2000), Fever (2001), Body Language (2003), Ultimate Kylie (2004), Showgirl Homecoming Live (2007), X (2007) and Aphrodite (2010), in addition to a remix of "Get Outta My Way" by Japanese electronic musician Yasutaka Nakata of Capsule. A special edition was also released, including a bonus DVD of music videos.

== Track listing ==
No.	Title	Writer(s)	Producer(s)	Length
1.	"Can't Get You Out of My Head" (from Fever, 2001)	Cathy Dennis; Rob Davis	Dennis; Davis	3:49
2.	"All the Lovers" (from Aphrodite, 2010)	Jim Eliot; Mima Stilwell	Eliot; Stuart Price (add.)	3:19
3.	"Wow" (from X, 2007)	Kylie Minogue; Karen Poole; Greg Kurstin	Kurstin	3:12
4.	"Spinning Around" (from Light Years, 2000)	Ira Shickman; Osborne Bingham; Kara DioGuardi; Paula Abdul	Mike Spencer	3:26
5.	"On a Night Like This" (from Light Years, 2000)	Steve Torch; Graham Stack; Mark Taylor; Brian Rawling	Stack; Taylor	3:31
6.	"In Your Eyes" (from Fever, 2001)	Minogue; Richard Stannard; Julian Gallagher; Ash Howes	Stannard; Gallagher	3:18
7.	"Love at First Sight" (from Fever, 2001)	Minogue; Stannard; Gallagher; Howes; Martin Harrington	Stannard; Gallagher	3:57
8.	"Slow" (from Body Language, 2003)	Minogue; Dan Carey; Emilíana Torrini	Sunnyroads	3:13
9.	"I Believe in You" (from Ultimate Kylie, 2004)	Minogue; Jake Shears; Babydaddy	Shears; Babydaddy	3:19
10.	"2 Hearts" (from X, 2007)	Eliot; Stilwell	Kish Mauve	2:51
11.	"Get Outta My Way" (from Aphrodite, 2010)	Lucas Secon; Damon Sharpe; Peter Wallevik; Daniel Davidsen; Mich Hansen	Cutfather; Wallevik; Davidsen; Sharpe (co.); Secon (co.); Price (co.)	3:38
12.	"The Loco-Motion" (from Showgirl Homecoming Live, 2007)	Gerry Goffin; Carole King	Steve Anderson	4:45
13.	"I Should Be So Lucky" (from Showgirl Homecoming Live, 2007)	Mike Stock; Matt Aitken; Pete Waterman	Anderson	3:23
14.	"Get Outta My Way" (Yasutaka Nakata Remix)	Secon; Sharpe; Wallevik; Davidsen; Hansen		5:28
Total length:				51:08

DVD
No.	Title	Length
1.	"All the Lovers" (Music video)
2.	"Get Outta My Way" (Music video)
3.	"2 Hearts" (Music video)
4.	"Wow" (Music video)
5.	"In My Arms" (Music video)
6.	"The One" (Music video)
7.	"All I See" (Music video)
8.	"I Believe in You" (Music video)
9.	"Giving You Up" (Music video)
10.	"Slow" (Music video)
11.	"Chocolate" (Music video)
12.	"Can't Get You Out of My Head" (Music video)
13.	"Spinning Around" (Music video)

== Charts ==
Weekly chart performance for Hits
Chart (2011)	Peak position
Japanese Albums (Oricon)	62

== Release history ==
Hits release history
Region	Date	Label	Format	Ref(s)
Japan	16 March 2011	EMI Music Japan	CD, CD+DVD	
Hong Kong	2 June 2011	Warner Music	CD+DVD	
Philippines	28 June 2011	PolyEast Records	CD+DVD	
