= KylieX2008 (video) =

2008 video by Kylie Minogue

Video by Kylie Minogue
- Released: 1 December 2008
- Recorded: 2 August 2008
- Venue: The O2 (London, England)
- Genre: Pop
- Length: 129:00
- Label: FremantleMedia
- Director: William Baker
- Producer: Kylie Minogue

Kylie Minogue chronology
White Diamond / Showgirl: Homecoming (2007)	KylieX2008 (2008)	Aphrodite Les Folies – Live in London (2011)

KylieX2008 is the 2008 DVD and Blu-ray Disc release of Kylie Minogue's tenth concert tour of the same name. The film features the entire concert (shot in Super 16 format) along with a documentary, stage backdrop projections, conceptual designs, and a photo gallery. Shot on 16mm film the Blu-ray release received comments regarding a grainy picture quality, due to 16mm not being suitable for HD TV.

== Track listing ==
No.	Title	Writer(s)	Length
1.	"Speakerphone"	Christian Karlsson; Pontus Winnberg; Henrik Jonback; Klas Åhlund	5:41
2.	"Boombox" / "Can't Get You Out of My Head"	Andrew Frampton; Danielle Brisebois; Jimmy Harry; Mark "Spike" Stent; Wayne Wilkins / Cathy Dennis; Rob Davis	5:04
3.	"Ruffle My Feathers"	Kylie Minogue; Richard Stannard; Paul Harris; Julian Peake	3:14
4.	"In Your Eyes"	Minogue; Stannard; Julian Gallagher; Ash Howes	3:28
5.	"Heart Beat Rock"	Minogue; Karen Poole; Calvin Harris; John Lipsey	3:20
6.	"Wow"	Minogue; Poole; Greg Kurstin	2:58
7.	"Shocked"	Mike Stock; Matt Aitken; Pete Waterman	2:40
8.	"Loveboat"	Minogue; Guy Chambers; Robbie Williams	5:31
9.	"Copacabana"	Barry Manilow; Jack Feldman; Bruce Sussman	4:39
10.	"Spinning Around"	Ira Shickman; Osborne Bingham; Kara DioGuardi; Paula Abdul	3:29
11.	"Like a Drug"	Mich Hedin Hansen; Jonas Jeberg; Engelina Andrina; Adam Powers	5:28
12.	"Slow"	Minogue; Dan Carey; Emilíana Torrini	4:58
13.	"2 Hearts"	Jim Eliot; Mima Stilwell	4:57
14.	"Sometime Samurai"	Minogue; Towa Tei	4:05
15.	"Come into My World"	Davis; Dennis	5:46
16.	"Nu-di-ty"	Poole; Karlsson; Winnberg	3:59
17.	"Sensitized"	Chambers; Dennis; Serge Gainsbourg	4:05
18.	"Flower"	Minogue; Steve Anderson	4:46
19.	"I Believe in You"	Minogue; Jake Shears; Babydaddy	3:01
20.	"On a Night Like This"	Steve Torch; Graham Stack; Mark Taylor; Brian Rawling	5:36
21.	"Your Disco Needs You"	Minogue; Williams; Chambers	5:33
22.	"Kids"	Williams; Chambers	5:23
23.	"Step Back in Time"	Stock; Aitken; Waterman	3:20
24.	"In My Arms"	Minogue; C. Harris; Stannard; P. Harris; Peake	5:14
25.	"No More Rain"	Minogue; Poole; Karlsson; Winnberg; Jonas Quant	6:28
26.	"The One"	Minogue; Stannard; James Wiltshire; Russell Small; John Andersson; Johan Emmoth; Emma Holmgren	4:24
27.	"Love at First Sight"	Minogue; Stannard; Gallagher; Howes; Martin Harrington	6:49
28.	"I Should Be So Lucky"	Stock; Aitken; Waterman	4:36
Total length:			2:08:42

Special Features

DVD edition
No.	Title	Length
29.	"12 Hours... in the life of Kylie Minogue"	17:07
30.	"Stage back-drop projections" ("Speakerphone"/"Can't Get You Out of My Head," "Ruffle My Feathers," "Sometime Samurai," "Like a Drug," "Sensitized")	26:35
31.	"Photo Gallery"	5:06
32.	"Conceptual Designs"	1:42
33.	"DVD trailer"	0:42
Total length:		2:59:54

Blu-ray edition
No.	Title	Length
30.	"Stage back-drop projections" ("Speakerphone"/"Can't Get You Out of My Head", "Ruffle My Feathers", "In Your Eyes", "Heart Beat Rock"/"Wow", "Loveboat", "Spinning Around", "Like a Drug", "2 Hearts", "Sometime Samurai", "Nu-di-ty", "Sensitized", "In My Arms", "No More Rain")	59:43
31.	"Photo Gallery"	6:47
32.	"Conceptual Designs"	1:42
33.	"DVD trailer (Hidden on the X logo)"	0:42
Total length:		3:33:59

== Charts ==
Chart (2009)	Peak position
Australian Music DVD Chart	2
Austrian Music DVD Chart	8
Czech Music DVD Chart	10
New Zealand Music DVD Chart	7
UK Music DVD Chart (OCC)	8
