= The Albums 2000–2010 =

2011 box set by Kylie Minogue

Box set by Kylie Minogue
- Released: 18 July 2011
- Recorded: 1999–2010
- Genres: Disco; dance-pop; Europop; R&B; electropop; synth-pop; nu-disco
- Length: 3:55:42
- Label: Parlophone
- Producers: Various: Kylie Minogue; Steve Anderson; Guy Chambers; Johnny Douglas; Julian Gallagher; Mark Picchiotti; Steve Power; Mike Spencer; Graham Stack; Richard Stannard; Mark Taylor; Rob Davis; Cathy Dennis; Greg Fitzgerald; Pascal Gabriel; Tom Nichols; Paul Statham; TommyD; Baby Ash; Chris Braide; Electric J; Kurtis Mantronik; Rez; Sunnyroads; Bloodshy & Avant; Cutfather; Freemasons; Calvin Harris; Jonas Jeberg; Kish Mauve; Greg Kurstin; Eg White; Andy Chatterley; Daniel Davidsen; Børge Fjordheim; Sebastian Ingrosso; Magnus Lidehäll; Nerina Pallot; Stuart Price; Lucas Secon; Damon Sharpe; Fraser T Smith; Starsmith; Peter Wallevik; Xenomania

Kylie Minogue chronology
Hits (2011)	The Albums 2000–2010 (2011)	Aphrodite Les Folies – Live in London (2011)

The Albums 2000–2010 is a box set by Australian recording artist Kylie Minogue. It was released by Parlophone Records on 18 July 2011. The five-disc box set was released in Europe, and Australasia, and included all of Minogue's studio albums from the years 2000 to 2010; Light Years (2000), Fever (2001), Body Language (2003), X (2007), and Aphrodite (2010). The cover sleeve for the album consisted of fragments from the original artworks inserted into Minogue's silhouette from her cover for Fever (2001). The Albums 2000–2010 marked Minogue's first box set collection until her October 2012 release, K25: Time Capsule.

Upon its release, The Albums 2000-2010 received positive reception from most of the reviewers, who complimented the overall packaging of the box set and her releases through Parlophone. Some of the critics were unimpressed with the exclusion of her work from the PWL and Deconstruction period. The box set charted on the UK Albums Chart at number 37, and on the Scottish Albums Chart at number 40.

== Background and packaging ==
It was first announced on Minogue's official website in May 2011 that EMI would be releasing a five-CD box set. The set includes every previous studio album Minogue had released from 2000 up until 2010; the original versions of Light Years (2000), Fever (2001), Body Language (2003), X (2007), and Aphrodite (2010), with each disc housed in a cardboard sleeve. The cardboard sleeves contain the original album artwork and one image from each album photo shoot imprinted inside the cardboard sleeve, without the album or Minogue's logo imprinted. Each box set features a 15" x 10" poster that features the credits and album artworks of the original albums. Inside the box, each of the albums represents a significant colour, as displayed on the cover: Light Years is light blue, Fever is white, Body Language is black, X is red, and Aphrodite is navy blue.

The box set carries out the original first press releases of each album, meaning that the hidden track from Light Years, "Password", is featured on the box set, and all released singles from each album use their single edit, and not the album edit. The only song to be absent is the bilingually-altered tracks for Minogue's single, "Your Disco Needs You", which appeared as a bonus track on Light Years in different regions. (Note: The altered versions of "Your Disco Needs You" include French, German, Spanish, and Japanese verses, all released as a bonus track on Light Years (2000), in their respective regions.) It was her first greatest hits box set to be released; in October 2012, to commemorate her twenty-fifth year in music business, she released her second, all-singles box set, K25: Time Capsule.

== Reception ==
Professional ratings
Review scores
Source	Rating
AllMusic	3.5/5 stars
Daily Express	3/5
Stagezine	4.5/5 stars
The Sun	5/5 stars
Paul Du Noyer	mixed

The Albums 2000–2010 received positive reviews from most reviewers. A writer from The Sun awarded the box set a perfect five star rating, stating "Whether you like hot-pant Kylie, indie Kylie, girl-next-door Kylie or dark Kylie, there's something for every Kylie fan in this special box-set. Made up of five albums and celebrating ten years of tunes, we challenge you to get them out of your head." Scott Harrah from Stagezine awarded the album four-and-a-half stars out of five, but did not review the box set; instead, he reviewed each album individually because "all [albums] are so different in both sound and concept." Jon O'Brien from AllMusic awarded the album three-and-a-half stars, labelling her earlier work as "infectious". Despite being critical towards the lack of inclusion of her 1994–1998 Deconstruction work, and the inclusion of her albums, X, and Aphrodite, he concluded "Kylie has yet to make that one essential album, and the going-through-the-motions nature of her later releases suggests her time may have passed, but this box set still contains plenty of moments to justify her position as one of the all-time premier pop princesses."

Writing in retrospect for Daily Express, reviewer Simon Gage was critical of Minogue's lack of musical progression, charisma, and thought that she lacked a "great voice". He stated "There are dodgy tracks and the 'voice', more processed than a tinned pea, does start to grate but it's still pretty good." He awarded the box set three stars. British journalist Paul Du Noyer reviewed the box set, and complimented Minogue's Parlophone work as "ambiguous pop". However, he stated "There’s a lot of ambitious pop in here, but no conceptual overreach. Not even her experience of breast cancer was allowed to surface in Kylie’s subsequent material: lyrically, it was straight back to business. It seems unlikely such a 20-year lucky streak could be sustained without a lot of shrewd decisions by Minogue herself. So it seems that everyone is right after all: Kylie is A Good Thing, and here is just enough of it."

In the United Kingdom, the box set debuted at number thirty-seven on the UK Albums Chart, becoming Minogue's nineteenth album entry since her debut album, Kylie (1987). The box set stayed in for one week on the top 100 chart. The Albums 2000-2010 also debuted at number forty on the Scottish Albums Chart for a sole week.

== Track listing ==
Light Years
No.	Title	Writer(s)	Producer(s)	Length
1.	"Spinning Around" (Includes hidden track 'Password')	Paula Abdul; Ira Shickman; Osborne Bingham; Kara DioGuardi	Mike Spencer	3:27
2.	"On a Night Like This"	Steve Torch; Mark Taylor; Brian Rawling; Graham Stack	Taylor; Stack	3:33
3.	"So Now Goodbye"	Kylie Minogue; Steve Anderson	Johnny Douglas	3:37
4.	"Disco Down"	Douglas	Douglas	3:57
5.	"Loveboat"	Minogue; Guy Chambers; Robbie Williams	Chambers; Steve Power	4:10
6.	"Koocachoo"	Minogue; Douglas	Douglas	4:00
7.	"Your Disco Needs You"	Minogue; Williams; Chambers	Chambers; Power	3:33
8.	"Please Stay"	Minogue; Richard Stannard; Julian Gallagher; John Themis	Stannard; Gallagher	4:08
9.	"Bittersweet Goodbye"	Minogue; Anderson	Anderson	3:43
10.	"Butterfly"	Minogue; Anderson	Mark Picchiotti	4:09
11.	"Under the Influence of Love"	Paul Politi; Barry Eugene White	Stannard; Gallagher	3:32
12.	"I'm So High"	Minogue; Chambers; Megan Smith	Chambers; Power	3:33
13.	"Kids" (with Robbie Williams)	Williams; Chambers	Chambers; Power	4:20
14.	"Light Years"	Minogue; Stannard; Gallagher	Stannard; Gallagher	4:47
Total length:				58:16

Fever
No.	Title	Writer(s)	Producer(s)	Length
1.	"More More More"	TommyD; Liz Winstanley	TommyD	4:40
2.	"Love at First Sight"	Minogue; Stannard; Gallagher; Ash Howes; Martin Harrington	Stannard; Gallagher	3:57
3.	"Can't Get You Out of My Head"	Cathy Dennis, Rob Davis	Dennis; Davis	3:49
4.	"Fever"	Greg Fitzgerald; Tom Nichols	Fitzgerald	3:30
5.	"Give It to Me"	Minogue; Picchiotti; Anderson	Picchiotti	2:48
6.	"Fragile"	Davis	Davis	3:44
7.	"Come Into My World"	Dennis; Davis	Dennis; Davis	4:06
8.	"In Your Eyes"	Minogue; Stannard; Gallagher; Howes	Stannard; Gallagher	3:18
9.	"Dancefloor"	Anderson; Dennis	Anderson	3:23
10.	"Love Affair"	Minogue; Stannard; Gallagher	Stannard; Gallagher	3:47
11.	"Your Love"	Minogue; Pascal Gabriel; Paul Statham	Gabriel; Statham	3:47
12.	"Burning Up"	Fitzgerald; Nichols	Fitzgerald; Nichols	3:59
Total length:				45:27

Body Language
No.	Title	Writer(s)	Producer(s)	Length
1.	"Slow"	Minogue; Dan Carey; Emilíana Torrini	Sunnyroads	3:15
2.	"Still Standing"	Ash Thomas; Alexis Strum	Baby Ash	3:40
3.	"Secret (Take You Home)"	Curtis T. Bedeau; Gerard Charles; Hugh Clarke; Reza Safinia; Lisa Greene; Paul George; Brian P. George; Lucien J. George; Niomi McLean-Daley	Rez	3:16
4.	"Promises"	Kurtis el Khaleel; David Billing	Kurtis Mantronik	3:17
5.	"Sweet Music"	Minogue; Karen Poole; Thomas	Baby Ash	4:11
6.	"Red Blooded Woman"	Douglas; Poole	Douglas	4:21
7.	"Chocolate"	Douglas; Poole	Douglas	5:00
8.	"Obsession"	Khaleel; Billing; M. Grey	Mantronik	3:31
9.	"I Feel for You"	Liz Winstanley; J. Piccioni; S. Anselmetti	Electric J	4:19
10.	"Someday"	Minogue; Torrini; Thomas	Baby Ash	4:18
11.	"Loving Days"	Minogue; Stannard; Gallagher; Dave Morgan	Stannard; Gallagher	4:26
12.	"After Dark"	Dennis; Chris Braide	Dennis; Braide	4:10
Total length:				47:44

X
No.	Title	Writer(s)	Producer(s)	Length
1.	"2 Hearts"	Jim Eliot; Mima Stilwell	Kish Mauve	2:51
2.	"Like a Drug"	Mich Hedin Hansen; Jonas Jeberg; Engelina Andrina; Adam Powers	Cutfather, Jeberg	3:18
3.	"In My Arms"	Minogue; Calvin Harris; Stannard; Paul Harris; Julian Peake	C. Harris; Stannard	3:32
4.	"Speakerphone"	Christian Karlsson; Pontus Winnberg; Henrik Jonback; Klas Åhlund	Bloodshy & Avant	3:54
5.	"Sensitized"	Chambers; Dennis; Serge Gainsbourg	Chambers; Dennis	3:57
6.	"Heart Beat Rock"	Minogue; Poole; C. Harris; John Lipsey	C. Harris	3:24
7.	"The One"	Minogue; Stannard; James Wiltshire; Russell Small; John Andersson; Johan Emmoth; Emma Holmgren	Stannard; Freemasons	4:05
8.	"No More Rain"	Minogue; Poole; Karlsson; Winnberg; Jonas Quant	Greg Kurstin	4:02
9.	"All I See"	Jeberg; Hansen; Edwin Serrano; Raymond Calhoun	Cutfather; Jeberg	3:05
10.	"Stars"	Minogue; Stannard; P. Harris; Peake	Stannard; P. Harris; Peake	3:41
11.	"Wow"	Minogue; Poole; Kurstin	Kurstin	3:10
12.	"Nu-di-ty"	Poole; Karlsson; Winnberg	Bloodshy & Avant	3:04
13.	"Cosmic"	Minogue; Eg White	White	3:09
Total length:				45:12

Aphrodite
No.	Title	Writer(s)	Producer(s)	Length
1.	"All the Lovers"	Eliot; Stilwell	Kish Mauve; Stuart Price	3:20
2.	"Get Outta My Way"	Mich Hansen; Lucas Secon; Damon Sharpe; Peter Wallevik; Daniel Davidsen	Cutfather; Wallevik; Davidsen; Sharpe; Secon; Price	3:38
3.	"Put Your Hands Up (If You Feel Love)"	Finlay Dow-Smith; Miriam Nervo; Olivia Nervo	Starsmith; Price	3:37
4.	"Closer"	Price; Beatrice Hatherley	Price	3:09
5.	"Everything Is Beautiful"	Tim Rice-Oxley; Fraser T Smith	Smith	3:25
6.	"Aphrodite"	Nerina Pallot; Andy Chatterley	Pallot; Chatterley; Price	3:45
7.	"Illusion"	Minogue; Price	Price	3:21
8.	"Better than Today"	Pallot; Chatterley	Pallot; Chatterley; Price	3:25
9.	"Too Much"	Minogue; C. Harris; Jake Shears	C. Harris	3:16
10.	"Cupid Boy"	Sebastian Ingrosso; Magnus Lidehäll; Nick Clow; Luciana Caporaso	Price; Ingrosso; Lidehäll	4:26
11.	"Looking for an Angel"	Minogue; Price	Price	3:49
12.	"Can't Beat the Feeling"	Hannah Robinson; Pascal Gabriel; Borge Fjordheim; Matt Prime; Richard Philips	Price; Gabriel; Fjordheim	4:09
Total length:				43:21

== Charts ==
Chart (2011)	Peak position
Scottish Albums (Official Charts)	40
UK Albums (Official Charts)	37

== Release history ==
Region	Date	Label	Format(s)	Ref.
Australia	12 June 2011	Warner Music Group; Rocket	Box set	
New Zealand	12 June 2011	Warner Music Group; Rocket	Box set	
United Kingdom	18 July 2011	Warner Music Group; Rocket	Box set	
Japan	18 July 2011	Warner Music Group; Rocket	Box set (Imported)	
United States	24 July 2011	Warner Music Group; Rocket	Box set (Imported)	
