= Black Heart (Kish Mauve album) =

Studio album by Kish Mauve
- Released: 30 March 2009
- Recorded: 2005–2008
- Length: 42:30
- Label: YNYS
- Producers: Kish Mauve, Dave Bascombe

Singles from Black Heart
- 1. "Modern Love" Released: 28 August 2006; 2. "Lose Control" Released: 22 September 2008; 3. "Come On" / "Morphine" Released: 2 March 2009

Professional ratings
Review scores
Source	Rating
Planet Sound	(8/10)

Black Heart is the debut studio album by British electronic duo Kish Mauve. It was released as a digital download on 30 March 2009 by YNYS Recordings. The album was recorded over three years and contains previously released material alongside new material.

== Track listing ==
All tracks were written and composed by Mima Stilwell and Jim Eliot, except where noted.

No.	Title	Length
1.	"Lose Control"	3:46
2.	"Matthew"	4:02
3.	"I Don't Care"	4:06
4.	"In My Kitchen"	2:58
5.	"Black Heart"	4:08
6.	"Come On"	3:51
7.	"Morphine"	3:16
8.	"You Make Me Feel" (Stilwell, Eliot, Kylie Minogue)	5:06
9.	"Modern Love" (Album Version)	3:37
10.	"Fahrenheit"	3:46
11.	"I'm in Love With Your Rock and Roll"	3:47
