= Jealousy (Will Young song) =

2011 single by Will Young

Single by Will Young

from the album Echoes
- Released: 19 August 2011
- Length: 4:04 (album version); 3:14 (radio edit)
- Label: RCA; Sony
- Songwriters: Will Young; Mima Stilwell; Jim Eliot
- Producer: Richard X

Will Young singles chronology
| "Hopes & Fears" (2009) | "Jealousy" (2011) | "Come On" (2011) |

"Jealousy" is a song by the British singer Will Young. It was written by Will Young, Mima Stilwell, and Jim Eliot for his fifth studio album Echoes (2011), while production was helmed by Richard X, with Eliot and Pete Hofmann credited as additional producers. The song was released as the album's lead single on 19 August 2011 in the United Kingdom and received widespread acclaim from music critics, eventually winning music website Popjustice's £20 Music Prize in 2012. "Jealousy" gave Young his first UK top-five hit in five years (since "All Time Love" in 2006, which reached number three).

== Reception ==
The Guardian described "Jealousy" as "a stately, radio-friendly slice of polite dance music with a fantastic vocal." Entertainment Focus called the track "simply stunning."

== Promotion ==
The song received its first radio play on BBC Radio 2 on 11 July 2011.

== Music video ==
The video for "Jealousy" was directed by Diamond Dogs and tells the story of impossible love where Young is "lusting for an otherwise engaged man." The majority of the music video is set around a group of acrobats and trapeze artists in training. It was first released onto YouTube on 29 July 2011 featuring an album version edit of the song at a total length of three minutes and eighteen seconds.

== Track listing ==
All tracks written by Will Young, Kish Mauve, and Jim Eliot.

Digital download
| No. | Title | Producer(s) | Length |
|---|---|---|---|
| 1. | "Jealousy" (Radio Edit) | Richard X; Jim Eliot^{[a]}; Pete Hofmann^{[a]} | 3:14 |
| 2. | "Jealousy" (Moto Blanco Radio Mix) | Richard X; Eliot^{[a]}; Hofmann^{[a]}; Moto Blanco^{[b]} | 3:31 |
| 3. | "Jealousy" (Moto Blanco Club Mix) | Richard X; Eliot^{[a]}; Hofmann^{[a]}; Blanco^{[b]} | 7:23 |
| 4. | "Jealousy" (The Alias Radio Edit) | Richard X; Eliot^{[a]}; Hofmann^{[a]}; The Alias^{[b]} | 4:24 |
| 5. | "Jealousy" (The Alias Club Mix) | Richard X; Eliot^{[a]}; Hofmann^{[a]}; The Alias^{[b]} | 7:59 |

Notes

- ^{^[a]} denotes additional producer
- ^{^[b]} denotes remix producer

== Credits and personnel ==
- Jim Eliot – additional producer, writer
- Pete Hofmann – additional producer, mixing engineer
- Alex Meadows – bass
- Mima Stilwell – writer
- Tim Weller – drums
- Richard X – producer
- Will Young – vocals, writer

== Charts ==
=== Weekly charts ===
Weekly chart performance for "Jealousy"
| Chart (2011) | Peak position |
|---|---|
| Hungary (Rádiós Top 40) | 35 |
| Ireland (IRMA) | 23 |
| Scotland Singles (OCC) | 4 |
| UK Singles (OCC) | 5 |

=== Year-end charts ===
Year-end chart performance for "Jealousy"
| Chart (2011) | Position |
|---|---|
| UK Singles (OCC) | 77 |

== Certifications ==
Certifications for "Jealousy"
| Region | Certification | Certified units/sales |
|---|---|---|
| United Kingdom (BPI) | Gold | 400,000^{‡} |
^{‡} Sales+streaming figures based on certification alone.

== Release history ==
"Chelsea" release history
| Region | Date | Format(s) | Label | Ref(s) |
|---|---|---|---|---|
| United Kingdom | 19 August 2011 | Digital download | RCA; Sony Music UK | |
