= Jim Eliot =

- Origin: London, England
- Genres: Electropop; synthpop; alternative pop; electronica
- Years active: 2005–present
- Label: published by Sony/ATV
- Website: Solar Management

Jim Eliot is an English songwriter, record producer and singer from London. He has written and produced for artists including Foxes, Ellie Goulding, Will Young, Kylie Minogue, Rae Morris and Olly Murs.

Eliot (synthesizer, vocals) is also a member of Kish Mauve, a British electropop group, which was formed in 2005 in London, England, alongside Mima Stilwell (vocals).

== Discography ==
=== Kish Mauve ===
==== Album ====
- Black Heart (2009)

==== Extended Play (EP) ====
- Kish Mauve EP (2005)

==== Singles ====
- "Modern Love" (2006)
- "Lose Control" (2008)
- "Come On" / "Morphine" (2009)

=== Production and writing ===
==== Discography ====
Year	Artist	Album	Song
2007	Kylie Minogue	X	"2 Hearts"
2008	Ladyhawke	Ladyhawke	"Better Than Sunday"
2008	Ladyhawke	Ladyhawke	"Love Don't Live Here"
2008	Ladyhawke	Ladyhawke	"Crazy World"
2008	Rosie and the Goldbug	Rosie and the Goldbug	"Lover"
2008	Rosie and the Goldbug	Rosie and the Goldbug	"War of the Roses (Because You Said So)"
2008	Rosie and the Goldbug	Rosie and the Goldbug	"Heartbreak"
2008	Rosie and the Goldbug	Rosie and the Goldbug	"Strange Girl"
2009	Kish Mauve	Black Heart	"Lose Control"
2009	Kish Mauve	Black Heart	"Matthew"
2009	Kish Mauve	Black Heart	"I Don't Care"
2009	Kish Mauve	Black Heart	"In My Kitchen"
2009	Kish Mauve	Black Heart	"Black Heart"
2009	Kish Mauve	Black Heart	"Come On/Morphine"
2009	Kish Mauve	Black Heart	"You Make Me Feel"
2009	Kish Mauve	Black Heart	"Modern Love"
2009	Kish Mauve	Black Heart	"Fahrenheit"
2009	Kish Mauve	Black Heart	"I'm in Love With Your Rock and Roll"
2010	Kylie Minogue	Aphrodite	"All The Lovers"
2010	Beatbullyz	—N/a	"Bounce"
2010	Rosanna Munter	—N/a	"Waterfall"
2011	Will Young	Echoes	"Jealousy"
2011	Will Young	Echoes	"Come On"
2011	Will Young	Echoes	"Lie Next To Me"
2011	Will Young	Echoes	"I Just Want a Lover"
2011	Will Young	Echoes	"Silent Valentine"
2011	Will Young	Echoes	"Hearts on Fire"
2011	Will Young	Echoes	"Safe from Harm"
2011	Jade Williams	—N/a	"Stop Hey"
2011	Olly Murs	In Case You Didn't Know	"Heart Skips a Beat" (featuring Rizzle Kicks)
2012	Ellie Goulding	Halcyon	"Don't Say a Word"
2012	Ellie Goulding	Halcyon	"My Blood"
2012	Ellie Goulding	Halcyon	"Anything Could Happen"
2012	Ellie Goulding	Halcyon	"Only You"
2012	Ellie Goulding	Halcyon	"Halcyon"
2012	Ellie Goulding	Halcyon	"Joy"
2012	Ellie Goulding	Halcyon	"Atlantis"
2012	Girls Aloud	Ten	"Beautiful 'Cause You Love Me"
2012	Olly Murs	Right Place Right Time	"Dear Darlin'"
2013	Little Boots	Nocturnes	"Motorway"
2013	Little Boots	Nocturnes	"Crescendo"
2013	Jetta	Start A Riot	"Feels Like Coming Home"
2014	Wrabel	Sideways	"Sideways"
2014	Christina Perri	Head or Heart	"Sea of Lovers"
2014	Chlöe Howl	—N/a	"Disappointed"
2015	Ellie Goulding	Delirium	"Scream It Out"
2015	Ellie Goulding	Delirium	"Two Years Ago"
2015	Will Young	85% Proof	"Brave Man"
2015	Will Young	85% Proof	"Promise Me"
2015	Will Young	85% Proof	"Love Revolution"
2015	Will Young	85% Proof	"U Think I'm Sexy"
2015	Will Young	85% Proof	"Gold"
2015	Will Young	85% Proof	"Like a River"
2015	Will Young	85% Proof	"Joy"
2015	Will Young	85% Proof	"Blue"
2015	Will Young	85% Proof	"Thank You"
2015	Will Young	85% Proof	"Where Are You Tonight"
2015	Will Young	85% Proof	"You Keep on Loving Me"
2015	Leona Lewis	I Am	"Power"
2015	Mikky Ekko	Time	"Smile"
2015	Karin Park	Apocalypse Pop	"Look What You've Done"
2015	Halsey	Badlands	"Strange Love"
2015	James Morrison	Higher Than Here	"Demons"
2015	Rae Morris	Unguarded	"Under the Shadows"
2015	Rae Morris	Unguarded	"Love Again"
2015	Markus Feehily	Fire	"Simple Love"
2015	Charlene Soraia	Love Is the Law	"Caged"
2015	Sigma	Life	"Glitterball" (featuring Ella Henderson)
2016	Foxes	All I Need	"Body Talk"
2016	Foxes	All I Need	"If You Leave Me Now"
2016	The Veronicas	Human	"On Your Side"
2017	E^ST	—N/a	"Life Goes On"
2018	Matt Cardle	Time to Be Alive	"Higher Powe"
2018	Matt Cardle	Time to Be Alive	"I'm Not Letting Go Yet"
2018	Matt Cardle	Time to Be Alive	"Desire"
2018	Matt Cardle	Time to Be Alive	"Time to Be Alive"
2018	Matt Cardle	Time to Be Alive	"Crazy Love"
2018	Matt Cardle	Time to Be Alive	"Hallelujah"
2018	Matt Cardle	Time to Be Alive	"Hole in the Boat"
2018	Matt Cardle	Time to Be Alive	"Nobody"
2018	Matt Cardle	Time to Be Alive	"Blind Faith"
2018	Matt Cardle	Time to Be Alive	"High as the Night"
2018	Matt Cardle	Time to Be Alive	"Human Nature"
2018	Matt Cardle	Time to Be Alive	"Don't Be So Shy"
2018	Matt Cardle	Time to Be Alive	"She"
2019	Ellie Goulding	Brightest Blue	"Flux"
2021	The Veronicas	Godzilla	"Stealing Cars"
