= Aphrodite Les Folies – Live in London =

2011 album by Kylie Minogue

Live album by Kylie Minogue
- Released: 28 November 2011
- Recorded: 11–12 April 2011
- Venue: The O2 Arena, London
- Genre: Pop
- Length: 120:00 (film); 90:00 (television edit)
- Label: Parlophone
- Director: William Baker; Marcus Viner
- Producer: Kylie Minogue; William Baker

Kylie Minogue album chronology
The Albums 2000–2010 (2011)	Aphrodite Les Folies – Live in London (2011)	The Best of Kylie Minogue (2012)

Kylie Minogue video chronology
KylieX2008 (2008)	Aphrodite Les Folies – Live in London (2011)	Kiss Me Once Live at the SSE Hydro (2015)

Aphrodite Les Folies – Live in London is the sixth live album by Australian singer Kylie Minogue.

== Background and release ==
The show was filmed in 3D during her "Aphrodite: Les Folies Tour" over two nights at The O2 Arena in London and directed by William Baker and Marcus Viner. A 2-CD LP was released with the film. It aired on Sky 3D as well as in cinemas in the United Kingdom and Ireland on 19 June 2011. It has since been shown in Australia, New Zealand, Mexico, Brazil and Poland in August 2011. Then in Chile, Colombia, Costa Rica, Denmark, Croatia, El Salvador, The Netherlands, Peru, South Africa, Serbia, Bulgaria and Indonesia in September 2011. It was also shown in Belgium and Argentina in October 2011, and debuted in the United States on Palladia in December 2011. A CD/DVD/Blu-ray was released on 28 November 2011. The film was released in three formats. Firstly, as a DVD with bonus two-disc audio recording of the concert. Secondly, as a limited edition box set with a DVD, two-disc audio recording and booklet. Lastly, there was also a Blu-ray release which includes a 2D and 3D recording of the show. All three packages also include the behind-the-scenes tour documentary, Just Add Water.

== Critical response ==
The live album and DVD were met with positive response from critics. Contact Music gave it a positive review, while the UK's The Independent gave the bundle a total of 4/5.

== Track listing ==
DVD and Blu-ray
No.	Title	Length
1.	"The Birth of Aphrodite" (Intro)	2:38
2.	"Aphrodite"	4:39
3.	"The One"	3:56
4.	"Wow"	4:01
5.	"Illusion"	6:49
6.	"I Believe in You"	3:15
7.	"Cupid Boy"	5:35
8.	"Spinning Around"	3:40
9.	"Get Outta My Way"	3:38
10.	"What Do I Have to Do"	5:14
11.	"Everything Is Beautiful"	4:54
12.	"Slow"	6:01
13.	"Confide in Me" (Intro)	2:38
14.	"Confide in Me"	3:35
15.	"Can't Get You Out of My Head"	4:41
16.	"In My Arms"	3:43
17.	"Looking for an Angel"	5:09
18.	"Closer"	3:24
19.	"There Must Be an Angel (Playing with My Heart)"	4:37
20.	"Love at First Sight"/"Can't Beat the Feeling"	4:14
21.	"If You Don't Love Me"	3:17
22.	"Better the Devil You Know"	7:18
23.	"Better than Today"	3:20
24.	"Put Your Hands Up (If You Feel Love)"	4:03
25.	"Million Dollar Mermaid" (Intro)	1:52
26.	"On a Night Like This"	4:14
27.	"All the Lovers"	5:30
28.	"Just Add Water" (documentary)
Total length:		1:55:51

CD (disc one)
No.	Title	Length
1.	"The Birth of Aphrodite" (Intro)	2:38
2.	"Aphrodite"	4:39
3.	"The One"	3:56
4.	"Wow"	4:01
5.	"Illusion"	6:49
6.	"I Believe in You"	3:15
7.	"Cupid Boy"	5:35
8.	"Spinning Around"	3:40
9.	"Get Outta My Way"	3:38
10.	"What Do I Have to Do"	5:14
11.	"Everything Is Beautiful"	4:54
12.	"Slow"	6:01
13.	"Confide in Me" (Intro)	2:38
14.	"Confide in Me"	3:35
15.	"Can't Get You Out of My Head"	4:41
16.	"In My Arms"	3:43
Total length:		68:54

CD (disc two)
No.	Title	Length
1.	"Looking for an Angel"	5:09
2.	"Closer"	3:24
3.	"There Must Be an Angel (Playing with My Heart)"	4:37
4.	"Love at First Sight"/"Can't Beat the Feeling"	4:14
5.	"If You Don't Love Me"	3:17
6.	"Better the Devil You Know"	7:18
7.	"Better than Today"	3:20
8.	"Put Your Hands Up (If You Feel Love)"	4:03
9.	"Million Dollar Mermaid" (Intro)	1:52
10.	"On a Night Like This"	4:14
11.	"All the Lovers"	5:30
Total length:		46:55

== Charts ==
Video

Chart (2011)	Peak position
Australian Music DVD (ARIA)	3
Belgian Music DVD (Ultratop Flanders)	8
Belgian Music DVD (Ultratop Wallonia)	8
Czech Music DVD (ČNS IFPI)	7
Dutch Music DVD (MegaCharts)	16
French Music DVD (SNEP)	25
Swedish Music DVD (Sverigetopplistan)	19
Swiss Music DVD (Schweizer Hitparade)	4
US Top Music Videos (Billboard)	17

Album

Chart (2011)	Peak position
French Albums (SNEP)	94
German Albums (Offizielle Top 100)	48
Mexican Albums (Top 100 Mexico)	46
Scottish Albums (OCC)	71
Spanish Albums (Promusicae)	46
UK Albums (OCC)	72
