= NAPT =

NAPT may refer to

- Network Address and Port Translation, the most common type of network address translation
- NAPT (electronic music artist), English breakbeat duo
- Native American Public Telecommunications
- North American Poker Tour, a series of televised poker tournaments
- Needs assessment and planning tools
- The Navy Advanced Placement Test, used to select applicants to the US Navy nuclear program
