= Laso =

Laso may refer to:

== People ==
- Francisco Laso, Peruvian painter and politician
- Joaquín Laso, Argentine professional footballer
- Maximiliano Laso, Argentine footballer
- Naia Laso, Spanish skateboarder
- Pablo Laso, Spanish professional basketball head coach
- Ramón Laso, Spanish serial killer

== Other uses ==
- LASO, Los Angeles County Sheriff's Department, California, U.S.
- LASO A German Spare Parts & Automobile Engine Manufacturing company

== See also ==
- Læsø
- Lasso (disambiguation)
