= List of Pop Rock General number-one singles of the 2010s =

Pop-Rock General, in the music industry, is a record chart that ranks the best-performing songs by monitoring radio stations in Venezuela that play predominantly pop and rock music and reported by Record Report.

== Chart history ==
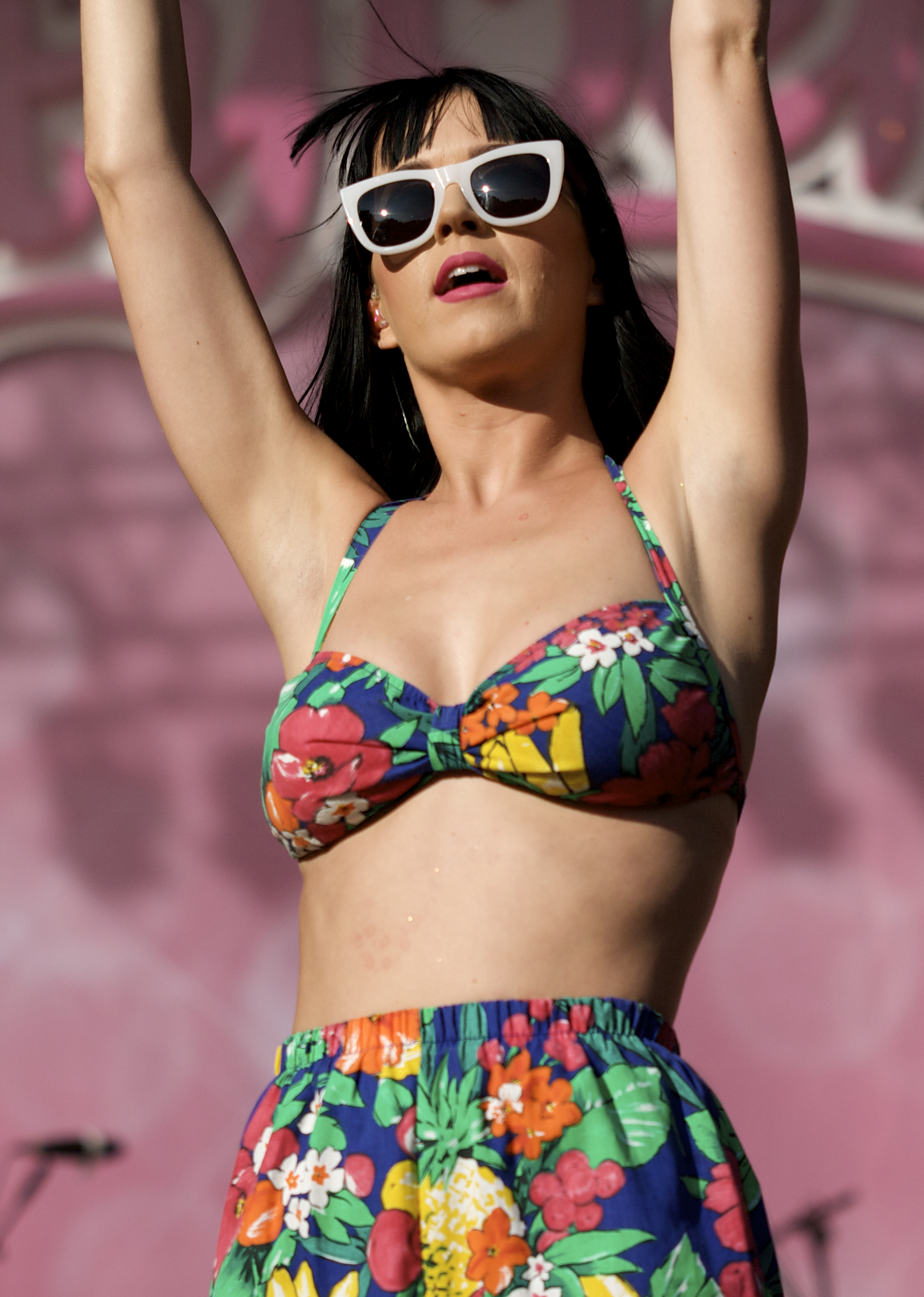
Katy Perry has had seven number-one hits in Venezuela from 2010 to date. At 12 weeks, Firework has the longest run at the top of the chart during the 2010s

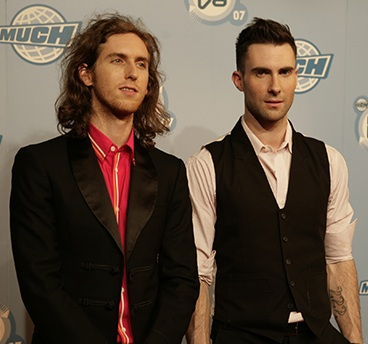
At 11 weeks, Maroon 5's Moves Like Jagger (featuring Christina Aguilera) has the second longest run at the top of the chart during the 2010s

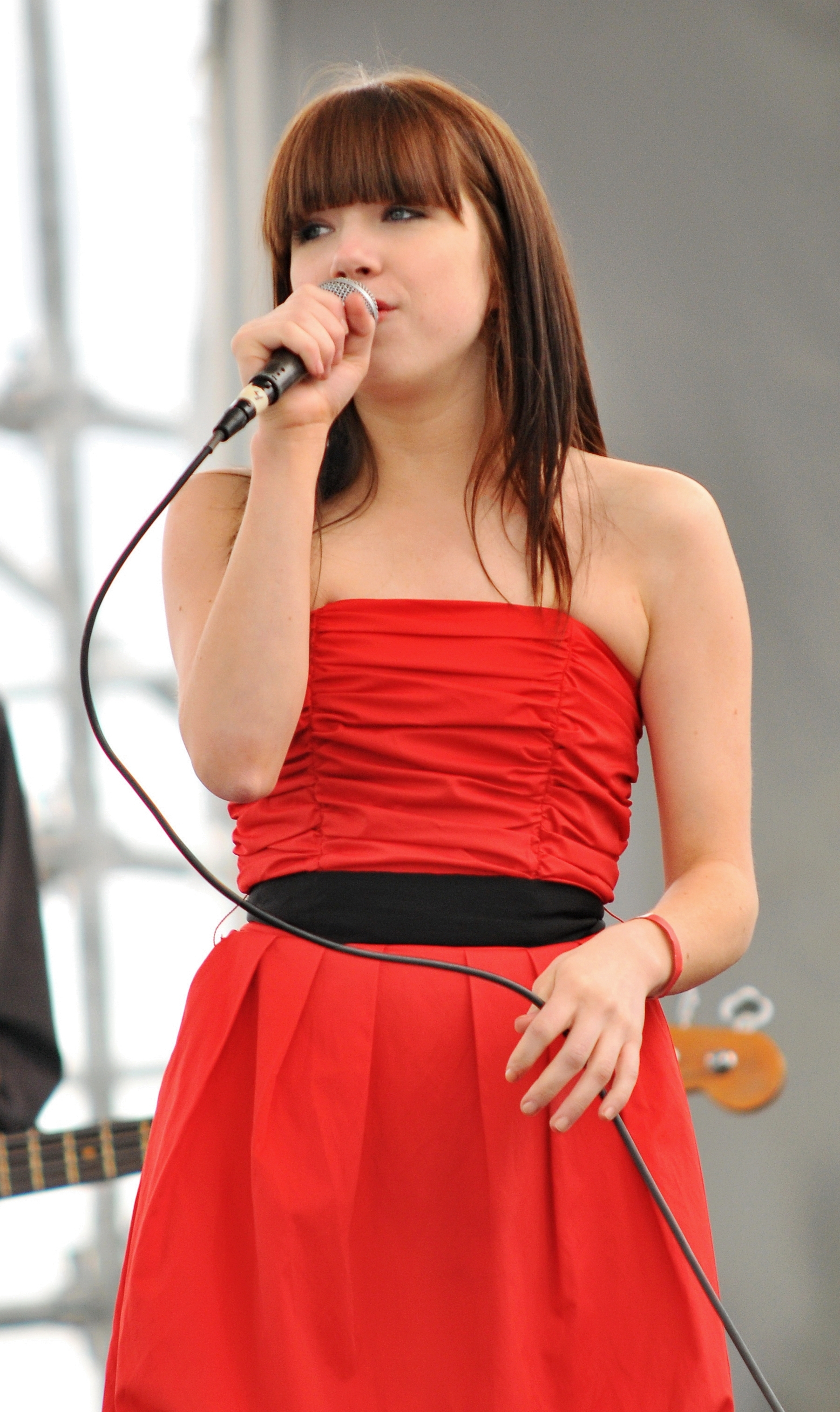
Carly Rae Jepsen's "Call Me Maybe" spent six weeks at number one in 2012 and was the second best-selling song of the year with over 30,000 digital copies sold.

Key
†	Number-one song of the year

Issue date	Song	Artist(s)	Weeks at No. 1
2010
January 2	"Tik Tok"†	Kesha	9
March 13	"Break Your Heart"	Taio Cruz featuring Ludacris	1
March 20	"OMG"	Usher featuring will.i.am	1
March 27	"Imma Be"	The Black Eyed Peas	3
April 17	"Telephone"	Lady Gaga featuring Beyoncé	2
May 1	"Not Myself Tonight"	Christina Aguilera	1
May 8	"All the Lovers"	Kylie Minogue	2
May 22	"Gettin' Over You"	David Guetta featuring Fergie and LMFAO	1
May 29	"Rude Boy"	Rihanna	1
June 5	"I Like It"	Enrique Iglesias	2
June 19	"California Gurls"	Katy Perry featuring Snoop Dogg	8
August 14	"Rubia Sol Morena Luna"	Caramelos de Cianuro	1
August 21	"Alejandro"	Lady Gaga	2
September 4	"Teenage Dream"	Katy Perry	2
September 18	"Misery"	Maroon 5	6
October 30	"Just the Way You Are"	Bruno Mars	6
December 11	"Raise Your Glass"	Pink	1
December 18	"Firework"† (2011)	Katy Perry	12
2011
March 12	"Born This Way"	Lady Gaga	5
April 16	"E.T."	Katy Perry featuring Kanye West	7
June 4	"Rolling in the Deep"	Adele	2
June 18	"Just Can't Get Enough"	The Black Eyed Peas	1
June 25	"Every Teardrop Is a Waterfall"	Coldplay	5
July 30	"Last Friday Night (T.G.I.F.)"	Katy Perry	1
August 6	"Every Teardrop Is a Waterfall"	Coldplay	1
August 13	"Last Friday Night (T.G.I.F.)"	Katy Perry	3
September 3	"Moves Like Jagger"	Maroon 5 featuring Christina Aguilera	4
October 1	"Sin Otro Sentido"	Lasso	1
October 8	"Last Friday Night (T.G.I.F.)"	Katy Perry	1
October 15	"Moves Like Jagger"	Maroon 5 featuring Christina Aguilera	7
December 3	"We Found Love"	Rihanna featuring Calvin Harris	8
2012
January 28	"It Will Rain"	Bruno Mars	6
March 10	"Give Me All Your Luvin'"	Madonna featuring Nicki Minaj and M.I.A.	2
March 24	"Te Veo"	Lasso	1
March 31	"Glad You Came"	The Wanted	4
April 28	"Part of Me"	Katy Perry	1
May 5	"Glad You Came"	The Wanted	3
May 26	"Somebody That I Used to Know"	Gotye featuring Kimbra	5
June 30	"Payphone"	Maroon 5	1
July 7	"Call Me Maybe"†	Carly Rae Jepsen	2
July 21	"Payphone"	Maroon 5	2
August 4	"Call Me Maybe"†	Carly Rae Jepsen	4
September 1	"Wide Awake"	Katy Perry	3
September 22	"Nube"	OKILLS	1
September 29	"Whistle"	Flo Rida	5
November 3	"We Are Never Ever Getting Back Together"	Taylor Swift	1
November 10	"Gangnam Style"	PSY	3
December 1	"Locked Out of Heaven"	Bruno Mars	9
2013
February 2	"Don't You Worry Child"	Swedish House Mafia featuring John Martin	1
February 9	"Amanecer"	Victor Drija	2
February 23	"Locked Out of Heaven"	Bruno Mars	1
March 2	"I Cry"	Flo Rida	1
March 9	"Scream & Shout"	will.i.am featuring Britney Spears	4
April 6	"No Hace Falta"	Los Paranoias	1
