= WSRM =

WSRM may refer to:

- WSRM (FM), a radio station licensed to Rome, Georgia, United States
- Welsh Socialist Republican Movement
- Windows System Resource Manager
- WS-ReliableMessaging, a network protocol
