= Rosie Vanier =

British musician

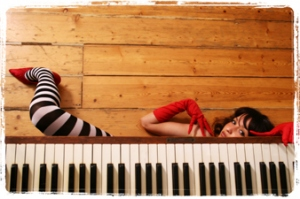

Background information
- Origin: Cornwall, UK
- Genres: Indie rock, electropop, punk rock
- Years active: 2007–present
- Website: Official website

Rosie Vanier is a British singer and keyboard player from Cornwall. She was a founding member and the front woman of Rosie and the Goldbug; following the break-up of the band in 2009, she embarked on a solo career, and went on to form the trio Lightknife in 2014.

== Life and career ==
Vanier grew up in Bodmin Moor "on a plot of land with no electricity, no heat, no TV, just a piano". Her mother and part-Native American father used to go on cycle tours in Europe, playing folk ballads along the way to entertain passers-by. She studied music at Roehampton University, and then returned home to Cornwall to form Rosie and the Goldbug in 2007, with bass player Lee "Pixie" Matthews and drummer Sarah "Plums" Morgan. Rosie and the Goldbug soon built up a reputation as a live band in Cornwall and started to attract wider attention. They toured Europe with Cyndi Lauper for most of 2008.

The band released an eponymous album on their manager's label, Lover Records, produced by Jim Eliot of electropop duo Kish Mauve; Vanier entered into writing partnerships with Marcella Detroit and Glaswegian band El Presidente for several songs on the record. In August 2009, Vanier announced via the band's MySpace site that "Rosie and the Goldbug are over". Vanier then embarked on a solo career, under the management of Fachtna O'Ceallaigh, who has worked with Sinéad O'Connor, U2 and the Boomtown Rats; she completed her debut solo EP, Ep1, in November 2010. Since going solo, she has collaborated with Adam and the Ants guitarist and songwriter Marco Pirroni, who was introduced to her by O'Ceallaigh, writing and recording new tracks together. She released a second EP, Black Cats and Black Stars, in October 2011, with a third, Neon Nightmare, following in early 2012, supported by a solo UK tour; the EP's title track was featured on a Music Week cover-mounted compilation CD in early February.

In early 2013, after some time out recording material in New York City, she was touring again with a band comprising Goldbugs bass player Matthews and drummer Bubs Taylor. Summer 2014 saw the release of the Bad in Love EP, under the band name Lightknife. Summer 2015 saw the return of Rosie and the Goldbug.

== Reception ==
Vanier's distinctive vocal and instrumental style has been described in The Guardian as "Kate Bush on crack with Goldfrapp on synths", her voice moving "effortlessly from seductive whispers to banshee wails". Q Magazine characterised her "enchanting howl" as "somewhere between Siouxsie & The Banshees and Cyndi Lauper having a sing-off with Kate Bush". A review of an Austin, Texas live concert in NME described her vocal style as ranging from Lene Lovich to Amanda Palmer. Simon Price, writing for The Independent, stated that "classically trained singer-pianist Rosie Vanier has a voice which leaps from sugary pop to operatic whoops, her ivories chiming through a repertoire ranging from the turbulent to the serene, and even juddering Moroder electro-disco". Her first solo EP, featuring a more aggressive style, was well received in The Cornishman: "... it's all here – Rosie's sex kitten, Betty Boop-gone-bad vocals, pummelling bass, choruses to die for and skittish hip hop beats. A definite step up from the Goldbug."

== Discography ==
=== EPs ===
- 2010 – Ep1 (1. "Little Suicides" – 2. "Dejavu" – 3. "False Alarms")
- 2011 – Black Cats and Black Stars
- 2012 – Neon Nightmare
- 2014 – Bad in Love (as Lightknife)
