= Echoes (Will Young album) =

Studio album by Will Young
- Released: 19 August 2011
- Length: 50:36
- Labels: RCA; Sony Music
- Producer: Richard X

Will Young chronology
The Hits (2009)	Echoes (2011)	The Essential (2013)

Singles from Echoes
- 1. "Jealousy" Released: 19 August 2011; 2. "Come On" Released: 21 November 2011; 3. "Losing Myself" Released: 18 March 2012; 4. "I Just Want a Lover" Released: 1 July 2012

Echoes is the fifth studio album by English recording artist Will Young. It was released by RCA Records and Sony Music on 19 August 2011. A departure from previous albums which saw him working with a diverse roster of collaborators, Young worked with music producer Richard X and Pete Hofmann on the bulk of the album. A television special, A Night With Will Young, aired on ITV on 27 August 2011 to coincide with the release of the album and recognising Young's impending ten-year anniversary in the music industry.

Upon its release, the album entered the UK Albums Chart at number one, becoming Young's third album to do so. "Jealousy" was released as the lead single from the album on 19 August 2011, reaching number five on the UK Singles Chart. Further singles "Come On", "Losing Myself", and "I Just Want a Lover" were less successful and failed to reach the top forty. Echoes sold 65,000 copies in its first week and has now sold just over 550,000 copies in the UK.

== Background ==
In November 2009, Young released his first greatest hits collection, The Hits. The album was a success on the charts, being certified platinum by the British Phonographic Industry. The following year, Young collaborated with electronic music duo Groove Armada on their album Black Light, singing vocals on the track "History". For his fifth album, turned to music producer Richard X after listening the X-produced Steve Mason album, 2010's acclaimed Boys Outside, which prompted Young to seek him out in the first place. Having previously claimed chart success with a succession of downtempo pop ballads, Young felt making a record utilizing electronic rhythms and beats was the culmination of a long-held dream. On his vision, he elaborated: "It's an album that I've wanted to do for about five years, and I've been waiting like a tiger, ready to pounce. You have to evolve as a pop artist. It's like being a magician: If you show all your best hands at the beginning, you have nothing left to reveal."

While X would serve as the album's chief producer, Young collaborated and co-wrote songs with various writers, including Andy Cato from Groove Armada, Kish Mauve, Fred Falke, The Sound of Arrows, Richard Stannard, and Pascal Gabriel. Musically, Young sought inspiration for Echoes from fellow UK dance-pop acts Pet Shop Boys, The Communards and Everything but the Girl, stating that he "wanted to hark back to that type of sound with strong bass but also very melodic." Aiming for a simple synthpop sound, Young added that "changing your sound is a tricky thing to do, but I think it's come about at the right time and from the right place. It's not a massive change, and it's very genuine." When Richard X joined the project, 90 per cent of the album had already been written. With his producing partner Pete Hofmann, he finished some arrangements and tweaks on demos before moving into the studio. Studio sessions were heavily influenced by live recording, a breakaway from previous sessions.

== Promotion and release ==
The album artwork was revealed on 6 July 2011 on Young's official Facebook page, and later posted on Young's official website. Teaser clips of several songs from the album were released by Young via Twitter shortly in advance of release. A television special A Night With Will Young was aired on ITV on 27 August 2011. The show featured Young performing a collection of new tracks from Echoes as well as a number of his biggest hits. Beginning October 2011, Young embarked on this fifth headlining tour, the Echoes Tour to promote the album.

== Critical reception ==
Professional ratings
Review scores
Source	Rating
AllMusic	3.5/5 stars
BBC	(favorable)
Digital Spy	5/5 stars
The Guardian	4/5 stars
Evening Standard	4/5 stars
The Independent	(unfavorable)
musicOMH	4/5 stars
The Scotsman	3/5 stars
The Telegraph	3/5 stars
Virgin Media	4/5 stars

Echoes received acclaim from music critics. Robert Copsey from Digital Spy rated the album five stars out of five and called it "a perfectly-crafted adult pop album; one that sounds contemporary without straw-clutching and classy without the pretension. The hands-in-the-air ballads "Lie Next to Me" and "Silent Valentine" prove that he's still the Will we've always known, just in a shinier, sharper and altogether more comfortable skin." The Guardian writer Caroline Sullivan compared Echoes to the work of George Michael and the Pet Shop Boys. She found that "Young stamps his identity on [the songs] with vocals that convey the disenchantment of a rich young gay man who's just taken a long look at himself in the mirror. 'Classy' is the word that comes to mind all the way through these 13 songs." Evening Standard's Rick Pearson complimented the album for its "playful, dancey quality" which he considered "a welcome change from the schmaltzy ballads that have characterised too much of Young's output." He summed Echoes as "a daring musical makeover that will win Young many new fans."

In his review for Allmusic, Jon O'Brien gave the album three and a half stars out of five and remarked that "few would have predicted that the UK's first Pop Idol would still be around a decade later, let alone making music as confident and self-assured as Echoes, which sounds like the album Young was born to make. He felt that the "13 highly personal tracks [...] largely eschew his trademark MOR blue-eyed soul in favor of an understated electro sound that perfectly fits his delicate and fragile vocals." Ian Wade from BBC declared Echoes a "fantastic, perfectly crafted adult pop album for people who’ve long wondered if such a thing existed anymore. It deserves to be reasonably enormous. Bravo, Will." musicOMH's Jude Clarke wrote that "this release is a clear illustration of why he has succeeded in transcending his origins. Now arguably one of the UK’s most authentic, honest and engaging stars, he is perhaps the first TV show alumnus to attain true Idol status. She felt "what is immediately striking is the apparently intensely personal nature of much of the material [...] delivered in Young’s tuneful yet frequently vulnerable vocal." James Lachno from The Telegraph noted that while "several anodyne tracks yearn for more vocal drama, overall an understated beauty permeates this well-crafted expansion of Young’s smooth adult pop."

== Commercial performance ==
Upon its release, Echoes entered the UK Albums Chart at number one on 28 August 2011 with first-week sales of 66,000 copies, becoming Young's third album to do so following his first two albums From Now On (2001) and Friday's Child (2003). The album was eventually certified gold by the British Phonographic Industry (BPI) for sales in excess of 100,000 copies, reaching platinum status on sales by December 2011. By November 2012 the album had sold 489,500 copies in the UK alone.

The first single to be released from the album was "Jealousy" on 19 August 2011. The single peaked at number five in the UK, becoming Young's highest-charting hit since 2006. On 3 October 2011, it was announced Young would release "Come On" as the second single from the album, which is a cover of a 2009 single by Kish Mauve. The single was immediately available to download, with an official date to be announced at a later date. The single peaked at number 83 in the UK. On 13 February 2012, the video for third single "Losing Myself" was posted on Young's YouTube page. It was officially released on 18 March 2012 and peaked at number 72. "I Just Want a Lover" was released as the fourth official single on 1 July 2012 in the UK, but did not chart.

== Track listing ==
Echoes track listing
No.	Title	Writer(s)	Producer(s)	Length
1.	"Jealousy"	Will Young; Mima Stilwell; Jim Eliot	Richard X; Eliot^{[a]}; Pete Hofmann^{[a]}	4:06
2.	"Come On"	Stilwell; Eliot	Richard X; Eliot^{[a]}; Hofmann^{[a]}	3:11
3.	"Lie Next to Me"	Young; Stilwell; Eliot; Stefan Storm	Richard X; Eliot^{[a]}; Hofmann^{[a]}	3:37
4.	"I Just Want a Lover"	Young; Stilwell; Eliot	Richard X; Eliot^{[a]}; Hofmann^{[a]}	3:25
5.	"Runaway"	Young; Donnie Sloan	Richard X; Jonathan Sloan; Hofmann^{[a]}	4:41
6.	"Outsider"	Young; Dan Carey	Richard X; Hofmann^{[a]}	2:46
7.	"Silent Valentine"	Young; Stilwell; Eliot	Richard X; Eliot^{[a]}; Hofmann^{[a]}	3:59
8.	"Losing Myself"	Young; Pascal Gabriel	Richard X; Hofmann^{[a]}	3:59
9.	"Personal Thunder"	Young; Fred Falke; Richard Stannard	Richard X; Falke^{[a]}; Hofmann^{[a]}; Stannard^{[a]}	4:52
10.	"Hearts on Fire"	Young; Stilwell; Eliot	Richard X; Eliot^{[a]}; Hofmann^{[a]}	4:54
11.	"Happy Now"	Young; Gabriel	Richard X; Hofmann^{[a]}	3:30
12.	"Good Things"	Young; Andy Cato	Richard X; Cato^{[a]}; Hofmann^{[a]}	4:12
13.	"Safe from Harm"	Young; Stilwell; Eliot	Richard X; Eliot^{[a]}; Hofmann^{[a]}	3:33

Notes

- ^{^[a]} denotes additional producer

== Charts ==
=== Weekly charts ===
Weekly chart performance for Echoes
Chart (2011)	Peak position
Irish Albums (IRMA)	12
Scottish Albums (Official Charts)	1
UK Albums (Official Charts)	1
UK Album Downloads (Official Charts)	1

=== Year-end charts ===
Year-end chart performance for Echoes
Chart (2011)	Position
UK Albums (OCC)	18

== Certifications ==
Certifications for Echoes
Region	Certification	Certified units/sales
United Kingdom (BPI)	Platinum	300,000^{^}
^{^} Shipments figures based on certification alone.

== Release history ==
Echoes release history
Region	Date	Format(s)	Ref(s)
Ireland	16 August 2011	CD; digital download	
United Kingdom	19 August 2011	Digital download	
United Kingdom	22 August 2011	CD	
Europe	19 August 2011	Digital download	
Germany	9 September 2011	CD	
Poland	30 January 2012	CD; digital download	
South Africa	30 January 2012	CD	
