= Losing Myself =

Single by Will Young

from the album Echoes
- Released: 18 March 2012
- Length: 3:59 (album version); 3:26 (single mix)
- Label: 19; RCA; Sony
- Songwriter(s): Will Young; Pascal Gabriel
- Producer(s): Richard X

Will Young singles chronology
"Come On" (2011)	"Losing Myself" (2012)	"I Just Want a Lover" (2012)

"Losing Myself" is a song by British singer Will Young. It was written by Young and Pascal Gabriel and produced by Richard X for his fifth studio album, Echoes (2011). The song samples the music contained in "Nightcall" by French musician Kavinsky which was the track used in the title sequence for the film Drive (2011). "Losing Myself" was released as the album's third single on 18 March 2012. It peaked at number 72 on the UK Singles Chart.

== Music video ==
A music video to accompany the release of "Losing Myself," directed by Henry Scholfield, was first released onto YouTube on 13 February 2012 at a total length of three minutes and fifty-five seconds.

== Track listing ==
Digital single
No.	Title	Writer(s)	Producer(s)	Length
1.	"Losing Myself" (Single Mix)	Will Young; Pascal Gabriel	Richard X; Pete Hofmann^{[a]}	3:26
2.	"Losing Myself" (Bimbo Jones Radio Mix)	Young; Gabriel	Richard X; Hofmann^{[a]}; Bimbo Jones^{[b]}	3:05
3.	"Believe"	Young; Gabriel	Richard X; Hofmann^{[a]}	4:06

Notes

- ^{^[a]} denotes additional producer
- ^{^[b]} denotes remix producer

== Credits and personnel ==
- Pete Hofmann – additional producer, mixing engineer
- Alex Meadows – bass
- Jeremy Shaw – guitar
- Pascal Gabriel – keyboards, programming, writer
- Tim Weller – drums
- Richard X – producer
- Will Young – vocals, writer

== Charts ==
Chart performance for "Losing Myself"
Chart (2012)	Peak position
UK Singles (OCC)	72

== Release history ==
Release history for "Losing Myself"
Region	Date	Label	Format	Ref(s)
United Kingdom	18 March 2012	19; RCA; Sony BMG	Digital download	
