= Windows System Resource Manager =

Component of Windows Server operating systems

Windows System Resource Manager (WSRM)
- Developer(s): Microsoft
- Written in: C++
- Operating system: Windows Server
- Successor: Hyper-V
- Website: docs.microsoft.com/en-us/previous-versions/windows/it-pro/windows-server-2012-R2-and-2012/hh997019(v=ws.11)

Windows System Resource Manager (WSRM) is a component of Windows Server operating systems that enables the allocation of resources, including CPU and memory resources, among multiple applications based on business priorities. An administrator sets targets for the amount of hardware resources that running applications or users are allowed to consume. It can allocate resources among multiple applications on a server according to defined policies. This can be helpful in a corporate environment when, for example, a well-behaved app has to co-exist with an application that has a memory leak. Without protection such as afforded by WSRM, the app runs more slowly and eventually crashes, because the misbehaving app eventually causes problems that affect every app that shares its memory space. With WSRM, an app can be limited to an isolated subset of hardware resources. As a result of this, the bad effects caused by the memory leak is limited to that subset.

WSRM is deprecated starting with Windows Server 2012. Microsoft recommends the use of Hyper-V as an alternative that provides similar functionality.

== See also ==
- List of Microsoft Windows components
- Process Lasso
