= Rosie and the Goldbug (album) =

Studio album by Rosie and the Goldbug
- Released: September 15, 2008
- Recorded: Le Cave, London
- Genre: Indie rock Electropop; Punk rock
- Label: Lover Records
- Producer: Jim Eliot

Professional ratings
Review scores
Source	Rating
Artrocker magazine	5/5 stars
inthenews.co.uk	link
MusicOMH	link

Rosie and the Goldbug was the eponymous debut album by Rosie and the Goldbug, released on September 15, 2008, on the band manager's label, Lover Records. It was produced by Jim Eliot of electropop duo Kish Mauve and mixed by Dave Bascombe.

The album contains a number of tracks co-written with other artists, including Marcella Detroit, formerly of Shakespear's Sister, Dante Gizzi and Giuliano Gizzi of the Glasgow bands El Presidente and Gun and Ashley Pope from UK dance duo NAPT.

It was to remain the band's only album; the band broke up in 2009. Singer/keyboardist Rosie Vanier has gone on to start a solo project.

== Track listing ==
No.	Title	Writer(s)	Length
1.	"Lover"	Rosie Vanier, Lee Matthews, Sarah Morgan, Jim Eliot, Philippa Brown	4:25
2.	"War of the Roses (Because You Said So)"	Rosie Vanier, Jim Eliot	3:10
3.	"Butterfly"	Rosie Vanier	2:53
4.	"Feeling"	Rosie Vanier	3:43
5.	"Heartbreak"	Rosie Vanier, Jim Eliot, Ashley Pope	4:22
6.	"Soldier Blues"	Rosie Vanier, Marcella Detroit	3:39
7.	"Contain You"	Rosie Vanier, Gareth Young	3:19
8.	"You've Changed"	Rosie Vanier, Dante Gizzi, Giuliano Gizzi	3:05
9.	"Strange Girl"	Rosie Vanier, Jim Eliot, Jemima Stilwell	3:22
10.	"In the Red"	Rosie Vanier, Lee Matthews, Dante Gizzi, Giuliano Gizzi	3:29
11.	"Springtime Dreaming"	Rosie Vanier	3:03
