= Lasso (disambiguation) =

A lasso is a loop of rope that is designed to be thrown around a target and tighten when pulled.

Lasso may also refer to:

== Software ==
- Lasso (programming language), an internet programming language
- Lasso (statistics), a technique for L1-norm regularization
- Lasso (video sharing app), a short video sharing app by Facebook
- Lasso tool, in image editing software
- Process Lasso, a process-optimization utility for Windows

== Fiction ==
- Lasso of Truth, a fictional weapon wielded by comic book superheroine Wonder Woman
- Luchist Lasso and Marco Lasso, characters from the manga series Shaman King
- Ted Lasso, an American television series, with a character, with the same name

== People ==
- Orlando di Lasso (1532–1594), composer of late Renaissance music
- Giulio Lasso (died 1617), Italian architect
- Galo Plaza Lasso (1906–1987), president of Ecuador from 1948 to 1952
- Félix Lasso (1945–2016), Ecuadorian footballer
- Guillermo Lasso (born 1955), president of Ecuador
- Lasso (singer) (born 1988), Venezuelan singer
- Lasso Coulibaly (born 2002), Ivorian footballer

== Places ==
- Lasso, Burkina Faso
- LASSO, Lasallian Schools Supervision Office

== Music ==
- "Lasso", a song from Phoenix's 2009 album Wolfgang Amadeus Phoenix

== Chemical ==
- Lasso, tradename for the herbicide Alachlor
