= White Diamond: A Personal Portrait of Kylie Minogue =

2007 documentary film

- Official release cover
- Directed by: William Baker
- Produced by: Tom Colbourne
- Starring: Kylie Minogue; Dannii Minogue; William Baker; Oliver Martinez; Bono
- Cinematography: Justin Murphy
- Edited by: Reg Wrench; Dan Swimer
- Music by: Steve Anderson
- Distributed by: EMI Records Ltd.
- Release dates: 16 October 2007 (United Kingdom); 19 October 2007 (Australia)
- Running time: 118 minutes
- Countries: United Kingdom; Australia
- Language: English

White Diamond: A Personal Portrait of Kylie Minogue is a 2007 documentary film directed and produced by William Baker and chronicling the life of Australian singer Kylie Minogue during her concert tour Showgirl: Homecoming Tour. It was filmed between August 2006 and March 2007 in both Australia and the United Kingdom.

Intended as an account of Minogue's return to the stage following her recovery from cancer, the film features on-stage and back-stage footage and interviews with several of Minogue's tour crew, including the director, William Baker. Kylie's sister Dannii and U2 lead singer Bono are also featured.

The film had a one-night premiere in each country, starting in the United Kingdom on 16 October 2007 and ending on 16 November 2007 in New Zealand. It was later released on DVD in two editions: the European/United Kingdom edition and the Australian/New Zealand edition. These were later followed by a two-disc edition; the second disc contained a concert that was filmed during Kylie's Showgirl: Homecoming Tour in Melbourne, Australia.

The title White Diamond was taken from one of Kylie's songs (written by Scissor Sisters). This song is the sole new song performed by her during Showgirl: The Homecoming Tour. The film opens with a reworked ballad version of it.

Two new songs, "I'm Hip" and "You Are There", are on the movie's soundtrack. Also on the soundtrack is "Alone Again", a previously unrecorded 2002 song that was co-written by Madonna and Rick Nowels.

== Background and development ==
At the beginning of White Diamond, the director, William Baker, says: "For most people, Neighbours, 'I Should Be So Lucky,' Michael Hutchence, gold hot pants, 'Can't Get You Out of My Head,' and cancer equals Kylie. I want to rip that surface away."

On 17 May 2005, Kylie Minogue was forced to cancel the Australian leg of her Showgirl tour after being diagnosed with breast cancer. This is the story of her homecoming. (Introductory pre-credits text from White Diamond.)

White Diamond started out when Kylie's creative director and close friend William Baker was filming her for a personal record that was to be used as backstage bonus footage for the Showgirl: Homecoming Tour DVD. They had so much footage by the end of the tour, that they decided it would be better suited to a feature-length documentary format.

The original plan was to release it directly to DVD, but it was eventually given a single-day cinema release in some territories.

The film focuses on Kylie during her Australian and European tour, Showgirl: The Greatest Hits Tour. But during that tour, it was announced on 17 May 2005 that she had been diagnosed with breast cancer. This led to the postponement of the remainder of that tour and to her withdrawal from the Glastonbury Festival. After having had surgery on 21 May 2005, her tour later resumed in November 2006 in Australia, under the name Showgirl: Homecoming Tour. Yet, while on this tour, Kylie was diagnosed with a respiratory tract infection. The tour was then postponed to January 2007.

Kylie stated that White Diamond was "a good way to thank the fans for their support and see where all their good wishes went. This started as quite a humble little project, and in many ways it still is." She had written on her website earlier in 2007: "I have to admit I was a little nervous to work on such a revealing project and I did pull the plug several times, but due to Willie's persistence it is now almost finished. It gives a great insight into the world of touring and the touring family."

== Cast ==
=== Main roles ===
- Kylie Minogue – the Showgirl (as credited at the end of film)
- William Baker – director, photographer, and Kylie's best friend (known as "Dear")
- Dannii Minogue – Kylie's sister, who appeared in the film for the duet "Kids"
- Bono – who also appeared for the duet "Kids"
- Oliver Martinez – Kylie's former boyfriend, who made an appearance in some short scenes

=== Dancers ===
- Jason Beitel, Marco da Silva, Jamie Karitzis, Alan Lambie, Claire Meehan, Welly Locoh-Donou, Jason Piper, Nikoletta Rafaelisova, Andile Sotiya, Nikki Trow, Anoulka Yanminchey, Rachel Yau, and Terry Kvasnik

== Production ==
=== Filming ===
A portion of White Diamond was shot in August 2006 in London, England, where Kylie had been living for 20 years. Kylie had travelled to Sadler's Wells studios for her dancing and choreography preparation for the Showgirl: Homecoming Tour. After that, the group went to Ealing, London, for musical rehearsals and to hold a promotional photo shoot.

Ruary McPhie filmed the England portion of the film (as noted in the end credits) because William Baker, the director, could not film there. While at Sadler's Wells, Baker said (in the film) that the tour would become a "bumpy ride" and would be emotional for everyone.

The group then went to Milan, Italy, for the designing of Kylie's outfits and costumes. While there, Kylie visited the fashion design company Dolce & Gabbana, who designed a cat-suit for her with gloves featuring "KM" on each glove.

Kylie also visited Chanel. They had travelled to Paris to get her custom-made Chanel Red Disc Dress. She had also had been invited to Paris Fashion Week. Kylie commented in the film that she was "blown away" and that she "loved it."

In November 2006, the group travelled to Sydney, Australia. While in Sydney, Kylie launched her perfume Darling. Later she performed in Brisbane, Australia, where she visited the Cancer Council. She said that the people there had "looked up to me and have been thinking about what I had been through," and that all of them had been "very brave" while fighting cancer.

After leaving Brisbane, she travelled to Byron Bay for a two-day break. She commented that her stay there was "freedom at last."

Kylie then travelled back to London and to the Wembley Arena for New Year's Eve. She celebrated there with the crew and the audience.

The last filming location was in Acapulco, Mexico, where Kylie did a commercial shoot and said that she would take a holiday there.

=== Music and soundtrack ===
Most of the songs in the film were performed by Kylie Minogue; however, the soundtrack also featured the English duo Pet Shop Boys, singing their song "Being Boring."

The Cure was also featured in the credits of the film for their song "Lovesong."

Liza Minnelli also had two songs featured in the film: "Rent" and "Losing My Mind."

"Kids" was sung with Dannii Minogue and Bono. The Bono version is on the tour's album, Showgirl: Homecoming Live, while the version with Dannii is a bonus feature on the movie DVD.

Kylie covered the songs "Vogue," "Try Your Wings," "You Are There," and "Diamonds Are a Girl's Best Friend."

All songs were published by EMI Ltd.

== Critical reception ==
Most critics compared the film to Madonna's 1991 film Truth or Dare (also entitled In Bed with Madonna).

Kathy McCabe of The Daily Telegraph gave it a positive review, saying "Kylie Minogue reveals her hopes and fears but few tears in White Diamond." She also described the film as "sparkling."

The Evening Times gave the film 2 out of 5 stars. They said that Baker was too close to the subject of the film and that, "We never see Minogue cry, shout, bitch, get tipsy or maudlin."

Fans have said that Baker, the director and a close friend of Kylie's, put too much of himself into the film relative to Kylie's actual screen time. Caitlin Moran of The Times said that the documentary was made by "a very discreet friend" and that it runs "an arse-fatiguing two hours." Before adding that it "leaves you in no doubt that Kylie is a charming, merry, adorable, disco mouse with a fabulous collection of shoes."

== Commercial performance ==
White Diamond premiered in the United Kingdom on 16 October 2007 at all Vue Cinema locations across the country in a one-night-only event. Kylie attended this premiere at the Leicester Square Vue Cinema. She arrived in a diamond-studded dress, wearing over $1,000,000 worth of jewellery. She was accompanied by her sister, Dannii, and actor Rupert Everett.

Similarly, in Australia there was a one-night-only premiere of the film at Village Cinemas on 19 October 2007 and in New Zealand at Skycity Cinemas on 16 November 2007. Everyone in New Zealand who attended the screening at the Skycity Cinemas received a free copy of Kylie's then-new single "2 Hearts."

== Music credits ==
Song	Performer	Songwriter
"White Diamond" (Film version)	Kylie Minogue	Kylie Minogue, Babydaddy and Jake Shears
"Jump"	Kylie Minogue	Kylie Minogue, and Rob Dougan
"Finer Feelings"	Kylie Minogue	Mike Stock and Pete Waterman
"Sometime Samurai"	Towa Tei and Kylie Minogue	Towa Tei and Kylie Minogue
"Tears"	Kylie Minogue	Kylie Minogue, Dave Ball and Ingo Vauk – Lyrics: Kylie Minogue
"I Believe in You"	Kylie Minogue	Kylie Minogue, Babydaddy and Jake Shears
"Burning Up"	Kylie Minogue	Greg Fitzgerald and Tom Nicholls
"Vogue"	Kylie Minogue	Madonna and Shep Pettibone
"Being Boring"	Pet Shop Boys	Tennant and Lowe
"Rent"	Liza Minnelli	Neil Tennant and Chris Lowe
"Lovesong"	The Cure	Smith, Gallup, Thomson, Williams, Tolhurst and O'Donnell
"Made in Heaven" (Film version)	Kylie Minogue	Mike Stock, Matt Aitken and Pete Waterman
"Kids"	Kylie Minogue and Bono	Robbie Williams and Guy Chambers
"Losing My Mind"	Liza Minnelli	Stephen Sondheim
"Try Your Wings"	Kylie Minogue	Michael Barr and Dion McGregor
"Je t'aime... moi non plus"	Kylie Minogue	Serge Gainsbourg
"Dreams"	Kylie Minogue	Kylie Minogue, Steve Anderson and David Seaman – Lyrics: Kylie Minogue
"Can't Get You Out of My Head"	Kylie Minogue and José González	Cathy Dennis and Rob Davis
"You Are There"	Kylie Minogue and Steve Anderson	Dave Frishberg and Johnny Mandel
"Somewhere Over the Rainbow"	Kylie Minogue	Harold Arlen and E.Y. Harburg
"Come into My World"	Kylie Minogue	Cathy Dennis and Rob Davis
"Alone Again"	Kylie Minogue	Madonna and Rick Nowels
"Light Years"	Kylie Minogue	Kylie Minogue, Julian Gallagher and Richard Stannard
"Turn It into Love"	Kylie Minogue	Mike Stock, Matt Aitken and Pete Waterman
"Diamonds Are a Girl's Best Friend"	Kylie Minogue	Leo Robin and Jule Styne

== Video release ==
White Diamond: A Personal Portrait of Kylie Minogue

Video by Kylie Minogue
- Released: 10 December 2007 (Region 2); 28 April 2008 (Region 1)
- Recorded: 11 December 2006 in Melbourne, Australia
- Genre: Pop music
- Length: 270:52
- Label: EMI
- Director: William Baker
- Producers: Tom Colburne, Kylie Minogue

Kylie Minogue chronology
Kylie Showgirl (2005)	White Diamond: A Personal Portrait of Kylie Minogue (2007)	KylieX2008 (2008)

Professional ratings
Review scores
Source	Rating
BBC News	link
The Daily Telegraph	link
IMDb	7.8/10
The Times Online	link

The documentary movie was released on DVD with a 15 rating on 10 December 2007. It was filmed in HD and released to cinemas in HD. No Blu-ray release has been planned.

In the United Kingdom, it was released in a two-disc package. The second disc contains a concert (Showgirl: Homecoming Tour) that was filmed in Kylie's hometown of Melbourne, Australia, on 11 December 2006.

The DVD also features bonus footage of Kylie and Dannii Minogue performing "Kids" in Melbourne's Rod Laver Arena on 16 December 2006, and five extra songs filmed in London's Earls Court on 6 May 2005. The respective DVD menus also reveal excerpts from the tour backdrops and photoshoots, where viewers can navigate songs or extra features. Both DVDs are available in three audio formats: Dolby Digital Stereo; Dolby Digital 5.1 and DTS 5.1. However, the bonus footages are only available in Dolby Digital Stereo format.

White Diamond was shown on United Kingdom television on 25 November 2007 prior to its release on DVD. The DVD reached number three on the Mexican Top 10 Music DVD Chart when it was released in Mexico in February 2008.

It was released on DVD in New Zealand on 16 March 2009 by Shock Records. It was rated "General" by the OFLC of New Zealand.

=== Track listing ===
Disc one: White Diamond Film
No.	Title	Length
1.	"I'm a Diamond for You"	4:30
2.	"First Day of School"	4:36
3.	"I Couldn't Go Back There"	2:08
4.	"People I Work With... Become My Family"	4:46
5.	"Every Aspect of What I Do Involves Artistry"	2:39
6.	"I Have Loved Dressing Up and Fashion Since I Was Little"	4:23
7.	"Bring On Australia"	4:22
8.	"The World Stopped Spinning"	8:13
9.	"That's Chanel Couture You're Snipping"	11:04
10.	"A Friend is Coming to Sing with Me Tonight"	6:17
11.	"What is It About Goodie Bags?"	3:25
12.	"I'm Going Into My Other World"	7:04
13.	"It's Groundhog Day"	9:20
14.	"My Body Was a Battleground"	5:54
15.	"You Are There"	9:37
16.	"Somewhere Over The Rainbow"	6:58
17.	"I'm Really Proud of This Year"	4:59
18.	"I Hate to Let You All Down"	5:59
19.	"I Don't See Why I Should Stop Now"	9:38
20.	"Diamonds Are a Girl's Best Friend / Credits"	2:59
Total length:		118:52

Disc one – Extra feature
No.	Title	Length
1.	"Kids" (featuring Dannii Minogue)	5:24

Disc two: Showgirl – Homecoming Tour (Melbourne, 11th December 2006)
No.	Title	Length
1.	"Overture"	2:24
2.	"Better the Devil You Know"	3:58
3.	"In Your Eyes"	4:52
4.	"White Diamond"	3:44
5.	"On a Night Like This"	4:30
6.	"Shocked / What Do I Have to Do?"	6:20
7.	"Spinning Around"	3:07
8.	"Confide in Me"	7:27
9.	"Cowboy Style / Finer Feelings"	4:48
10.	"Too Far"	4:37
11.	"Butterfly"	3:09
12.	"Red Blooded Woman / Where the Wild Roses Grow"	4:46
13.	"Slow"	4:30
14.	"Kids" (featuring Bono)	5:28
15.	"Somewhere Over the Rainbow"	3:54
16.	"Come into My World"	3:03
17.	"Chocolate"	3:05
18.	"I Believe in You"	3:28
19.	"Dreams (Impossible Princess)"	3:53
20.	"Burning Up / Vogue"	3:22
21.	"The Locomotion"	4:41
22.	"I Should Be So Lucky"	3:36
23.	"Hand on Your Heart"	4:14
24.	"Can't Get You Out of My Head"	5:50
25.	"Light Years / Turn It into Love"	9:37
26.	"Especially for You"	7:23
27.	"Love at First Sight"	5:46
28.	"Credits"	1:20
Total length:		125:29

Disc two – Extra feature: Showgirl Live from Earls Court Re-Edit
No.	Title	Length
1.	"In Denial"	2:47
2.	"Je Ne Sais Pas Pourquoi"	3:09
3.	"Confide in Me"	5:16
4.	"Please Stay"	5:01
5.	"Your Disco Needs You"	4:54
Total length:		21:07

Disc two – ROM Section
No.	Title	Length
1.	"Weblinks"
2.	"Screensaver"
3.	"Wallpapers"
4.	"Photo gallery"

Notes

- On disc one, the documentary is divided into chapters and named as in the DVD menu's chapters section.
- On disc two, the songs are divided into separate acts, including:
  - Act 1: Showgirl (tracks 1–5)
  - Act 2: Everything Taboo (tracks 6, 7)
  - Act 3: Samsara (tracks 8–10)
  - Act 4: Athletica (tracks 11–14)
  - Act 5: Dreams (tracks 15–19)
  - Act 6: Pop Paradiso (tracks 20–23)
  - Act 7: Dance of the Cybermen (tracks 24, 25)
  - Encore (tracks 26, 27)

== See also ==
- X (Kylie Minogue album) The song "White Diamond" is contained in the Australia and New Zealand iTunes bonus tracks of this album.
