= Come On (Kish Mauve song) =

Song by Kish Mauve

Single by Kish Mauve

from the album Black Heart
- Released: 2 March 2009
- Length: 3:54
- Label: YNYS
- Songwriters: Mima Stilwell; Jim Eliot
- Producer: Kish Mauve

Kish Mauve singles chronology
"Lose Control" (2008)	"Come On" / "Morphine" (2009)

"Come On" is a song performed by British electronic duo Kish Mauve. It was written and produced by band members Mima Stilwell and Jim Eliot for their debut album Black Heart (2009). The song was released as a double A-side single with "Morphine" on 2 March 2009 by YNYS Recordings. In 2011, "Come On" was covered by British singer-songwriter Will Young and released as the second single from his fifth studio album, Echoes (2011).

== Track listings ==
All tracks were written and composed by Mima Stilwell and Jim Eliot.

Digital single
No.	Title	Length
1.	"Come On"	3:54
2.	"Morphine"	3:16

== Release history ==
Release history for "Come On"
Region	Date	Label	Format	Ref(s)
United Kingdom	2 March 2009	YNYS Recordings	Digital download	

== Will Young version ==
"Come On"

Single by Will Young

from the album Echoes
- Released: 21 November 2011
- Length: 3:11
- Songwriters: Mima Stilwell; Jim Eliot
- Producer: Richard X

Will Young singles chronology
"Jealousy" (2011)	"Come On" (2011)	"Losing Myself" (2012)

"Come On" was covered by British singer-songwriter and actor Will Young. It was released on 21 November 2011 as the second single from his fifth studio album, Echoes (2011). The song peaked at 83 on the UK Singles Chart.

=== Critical reception ===
Robert Copsey of Digital Spy gave the song four stars out of five and a called it "far more than a note-for-note rehash. "Walk away, that's what you do," he bawls innocently over bobbing synths courtesy of Richard X, before defiantly calling "come on, come on" to his contrary lover. In fact, even after repeated listens, Young's lounge-pop reinvention still sounds like a different number altogether."

=== Music video ===
A music video to accompany the release of "Come On," directed by Chris Sweeney, was first released onto YouTube on 24 October 2011 at a total length of three minutes and twenty-eight seconds.

The video features a young man and his pet at a dog talent show. The pair struggle through most of the rounds, much to the disapproval of the judges and crowd. Later the dog injures its leg during the obstacle course, which the owner attends to and carefully bandages, while a flashback plays of their long relationship since childhood. During the final round of the day, the pair surprised the audience by performing acrobatics and a coordinated dance, causing the crowd to cheer.

=== Track listing ===
All tracks written by Mima Stilwell, and Jim Eliot.

Digital single
No.	Title	Producer(s)	Length
1.	"Come On" (radio edit)	Richard X; Jim Eliot^{[a]}; Pete Hofmann^{[a]}	3:13
2.	"Come On" (beatless)	Richard X; Eliot^{[a]}; Hofmann^{[a]}	3:58
3.	"Come On" (Cahill club remix)	Richard X; Eliot^{[a]}; Hofmann^{[a]}; Cahill^{[b]}	7:30

Notes

- ^{^[a]} denotes additional producer
- ^{^[b]} denotes remix producer

=== Credits and personnel ===
- Jim Eliot – additional producer, writer
- Pete Hofmann – additional producer, mixing engineer
- Alex Meadows – bass
- Jeremy Shaw – guitar
- Mima Stilwell – writer
- Tim Weller – drums
- Richard X – producer
- Will Young – vocals, writer

=== Charts ===
Chart performance for "Come On"
Chart (2011)	Peak position
UK Singles (OCC)	83

=== Release history ===
Release history for "Come On"
Region	Date	Label	Format	Ref(s)
United Kingdom	21 November 2011	19; RCA; Sony BMG	Digital download	
