= Rosie and the Goldbug =

British indie-rock trio

- Origin: Cornwall, England
- Genres: Indie rock Electropop
- Years active: 2007–present
- Label: Public Recordings
- Members: Rosie Vanier; Lee "Pixie" Matthews "Bubs" Taylor

Rosie and the Goldbug was a British indie-rock trio formed in Cornwall in 2007, consisting of singer and keyboard player Rosie Vanier; guitarist and bassist Lee "Pixie" Matthews; drummer and guitarist Joseph "Bubs" Taylor; and, formerly, drummer Sarah "Plums" Morgan.

== History ==
=== Formation and Rosie and the Goldbug (2007–2009) ===
The band are from Cornwall, England. They formed in 2007, after lead singer and keyboard player Rosie Vanier had completed her music studies at Roehampton University and returned home, eager to form a band. The "Goldbug" in the band's name is a reference to the story by Edgar Allan Poe.

According to The Guardian, Vanier grew up in Bodmin Moor "on a plot of land with no electricity, no heat, no TV, just a piano", which she was made to play by her parents. She comes from a musical background, as her parents used to go on cycle tours in Europe while stopping to play folk genre ballads to entertain passers-by. The bass player and guitarist, Lee "Pixie" Matthews, is the son of "hippie-surfer parents who spent his childhood in a beachside caravan." The drummer, Sarah "Plums" Morgan, had previously played with a Japanese drumming ensemble. Matthews and Morgan knew each other from being university students in Exmouth; and had played in a band together before joining Vanier.

Rosie and the Goldbug have built up a reputation as a live band in Cornwall and started to attract wider attention. They toured Europe with Cyndi Lauper for most of 2008. The band released their music on their manager's label, Lover Records. They said that going it alone was an easy decision to make; according to the BBC, they wanted "to make it purely on talent alone and stay true to their roots" and were hoping that without relying on the support of a major label, people would be "more honest and raw about them." They entered into writing partnerships with Marcella Detroit and Glaswegian band El Presidente on some of the tracks of their debut album. Their first EP and album were produced by Jim Eliot of electropop duo Kish Mauve.

=== Disbanding and solo EP (2009–2014) ===
Despite positive response from the music press, a management dispute temporarily derailed the project. and on 14 August 2009, the band announced via their MySpace site that "Rosie and the Goldbug are over". The band members voiced regret, but did not go into any detail as to what had caused their decision.

The band had planned to record a second album in the U.S., with new management. Vanier subsequently embarked on a solo project; she completed a debut solo EP in November 2010. Vanier and bassist Lee "Pixie" Matthews continued to work with each other, touring (with guitarist Rich Searby and drummer Joseph "Bubs" Taylor) as "Rosie and the Vandals" in 2013 and releasing the Bad in Love EP as a trio with Taylor in 2014, under the band name Lightknife.

Vanier subsequently stated despite the changing name, the Rosie and The Goldbug project was never completely abandoned. She told West Briton, "They were all Rosie and the Goldbug in disguise. I definitely felt like a suppressed artist for a while."

=== Re-formation (2014–2015) ===
After signing a new deal with Public Records towards the end of 2014, a renewed Rosie and Goldbug – now consisting of Vanier, Matthews on bass and Taylor on drums – are once again recording and releasing new music.

Single 'Running In The Dark', recorded at The Cube studio near Truro and produced by Gareth Young, was released in May 2015.

== Reception ==
The band's style mixes electronics and rock and was described as "Kate Bush on crack with Goldfrapp on synths," with Vanier's voice moving "effortlessly from seductive whispers to banshee wails." Q Magazine characterised it as "somewhere between Siouxsie & The Banshees and Cyndi Lauper having a sing-off with Kate Bush; the band’s spiky synth stabs providing the perfect canvas for Vanier's enchanting howl." Simon Price, writing for The Independent, stated that the "drama-pop trio" was like a throwback to "more interesting times", noting that "Classically trained singer-pianist Rosie Vanier has a voice which leaps from sugary pop to operatic whoops, her ivories chiming through a repertoire ranging from the turbulent to the serene, and even juddering Moroder electro-disco." Morgan's playing was characterised in an NME review of a live concert as "primal, cavewoman-with-class drum bashing". Clash announced in September 2008 that the band had become "one of the hottest names to drop on the indie scene", describing the group as "sexually charged".

== Line-up ==
- Rosie Vanier (vocals, piano, synths, wurlitzer)
- Lee "Pixie" Matthews (bass, guitar, backing vocals)
- (formerly) Sarah "Plums" Morgan (drums, backing vocals)
- Joseph "Bubs" Taylor (drums, guitar, backing vocals)

== Discography ==
=== Albums ===
- 2008 – Rosie and the Goldbug

=== EPs ===
- 2008 – War of the Roses (Because You Said So)

=== Singles ===
- 2008 – "Lover"
- 2008 – "Butterfly"
- 2008 – "You've Changed"
- 2009 – "Heartbreak"
