= All the Lovers =

2010 single by Kylie Minogue

Single by Kylie Minogue

from the album Aphrodite
- B-side: "Go Hard or Go Home"; "Los Amores"
- Released: 11 June 2010
- Recorded: 2010
- Studio: Tracques (London, England)
- Genre: Disco; synth-pop
- Length: 3:20 (album version); 3:20 (Spanish version)
- Label: Parlophone
- Songwriters: Jim Eliot; Mima Stilwell
- Producers: Jim Eliot; Stuart Price

Kylie Minogue singles chronology
| "Lhuna" (2008) | "All the Lovers" (2010) | "Get Outta My Way" (2010) |

Music video
- "All the Lovers" on YouTube

"All the Lovers" is a song recorded by Australian recording artist Kylie Minogue for her eleventh studio album, Aphrodite (2010). Parlophone released it on 11 June 2010 as the lead single from the album. The song was written and produced by Jim Eliot alongside Mima Stilwell; Stuart Price provided additional production. Musically, "All the Lovers" is an electropop-influenced disco and synth-pop track. The lyrics of the song serve as an invitation to the dance floor and an assertion that Minogue's past relationships do not "compare" to the one she shares with her present lover.

"All the Lovers" received critical acclaim and was commended for its chorus and production. Many critics found it similar to Minogue's 2004 single "I Believe in You". "All the Lovers" peaked at number 13 on the Australian Singles Chart. In Europe, it reached the top ten in numerous countries, including Austria, Belgium, France, Italy, Spain, Switzerland, and the United Kingdom. It has also topped the Dance Club Songs chart in the United States. The song was certified platinum in the United Kingdom, and gold in Australia and Italy.

The music video for "All the Lovers" was filmed in Downtown Los Angeles by Joseph Kahn and features Minogue singing the song from atop a pyramid of underwear-clad couples. Critical reception towards the video was favourable, with many critics enjoying its concept and imagery. The music video was banned in several Asian countries due to its sexual nature. Minogue performed the song on various television shows, such as Germany's Next Topmodel and Alan Carr: Chatty Man. In 2012, Minogue re-recorded the song for inclusion on her orchestral compilation album, The Abbey Road Sessions.

== Background and release ==
"The single was one of the last tracks to be written for the album. As I was recording it I knew that 'All The Lovers' had to be the first single; it sums up the euphoria of the album perfectly. It gives me goose-bumps, so I'm really excited to hear what everyone thinks of it."

— Minogue, on her decision to choose "All the Lovers" as the lead single from Aphrodite.

Following her recovery from breast cancer, Minogue released her tenth studio album X in 2007. Slated to be released as Minogue's comeback album, X went platinum in her native-country Australia after it debuted at number one on the Australian Albums chart. In the United Kingdom, the album entered and peaked at number four on the UK Albums Chart and was eventually certified platinum. Critical reception towards X was generally favourable, but many critics felt that it lacked introspection from Minogue's side. Later on, critics argued that the album did not serve as a worthy comeback for Minogue.

Soon, Minogue began working on her eleventh studio album Aphrodite. Grammy Award-winning British electronic music producer Stuart Price was enlisted as the executive producer of the album. "All the Lovers" was one of the last tracks to be written for Aphrodite and "only really came up" during the last three weeks of the recording sessions. It was written by Jim Eliot and Mima Stilwell, known collectively as British electropop group Kish Mauve. The duo had previously collaborated with Minogue on "2 Hearts", the lead single from X. Eliot produced the track and Price handled additional production and mixing. Minogue also recorded a Spanish-language version of the song entitled "Los Amores".

Minogue felt "All the Lovers" summarised the "euphoria" of the album perfectly and chose it to be the lead single from Aphrodite. She premiered the song on radio stations in the United Kingdom on 14 May 2010. It was released worldwide as the lead single on 11 June 2010 in CD single formats. The song was also made available to download digitally at the iTunes Store on the same day. In the United Kingdom, "All the Lovers" was initially released digitally on 13 June and later received a physical release in various formats on 28 June 2010. "Los Amores" and "Go Hard or Go Home" were included as the B-sides to the song.

== Composition ==
"All the Lovers" (2010)
An 18-second sample of the chorus of the song, which is backed a warbling synthesizer riff and was deemed "anthemic".

Musically, "All the Lovers" is an electropop-influenced disco and synth-pop track. According to the sheet music of the song published at Musicnotes.com by Sony/ATV Music Publishing, "All the Lovers" is composed in the key of C major and follows a midtempo of 142 beats per minute. Minogue's vocal range spans from the key of G_{3} to A_{4}. Minogue's breathy and whisper-y vocal delivery and the electronic production of the song make it similar to "I Believe in You", a single from Minogue's greatest hits album Ultimate Kylie (2004).

Through the lyrics of the song, Minogue invites her lover to dance with her, beginning with a line in which she softly sings "Dance, it's all I wanna do, so won't you dance? I'm standing here with you, why won't you move?". During the anthemic chorus of the song, which is backed by a warbling synthesizer riff, Minogue asserts that her previous relationships do not "compare" to her present one, singing "All the lovers that have gone before, they don't compare to you / Don't be frightened, just give me a little bit more / They don't compare, all the lovers." UK-based music website Popjustice opined that the song is "not really about relaxing while you dance, it's about relaxing into a relationship." Fraser McAlpine from BBC Chart Blog felt the "elegiac" and sad-toned chorus "makes the verses transform from a straightforward plea for dancefloor action into what sounds like a demand that everyone join Kylie for one last dance before things become spoiled forever." The song features a bridge section in which Minogue again asks her lover to dance with her, after which an electronic breakdown takes place.

== Critical reception ==
"All the Lovers" was acclaimed by music critics and fans alike. Fraser McAlpine from BBC Chart Blog rated the single five out of five stars and applauded its chorus, calling it a "dancing/crying/loving feeling [...] applied to everyone in a universal gesture of affection and regret." The critic praised the electropop influences of the song and Minogue's vocal delivery. Nick Levine from Digital Spy also rewarded "All the Lovers" a perfect five-star score and called it a "shimmering midtempo electro-disco tune with a lovely arms-in-the-air chorus." He found the song similar to "I Believe in You". Entertainment Weekly critic Adam Markovitz opined that "All the Lovers" was not a "full-on dance track production-wise", but predicted the song would attain "near-ubiquity in gyms, gay clubs, and clothing stores." Robbie Daw from Idolator felt its production stayed true to Minogue's roots, labelling the song "100% pure Kylie", and found it comparable to "I Believe in You."

Daily Mirror critic Gavin Martin gave "All the Lovers" a four out of five rating and complimented the song's production and mixing, saying they "ensure Kylie's pint-size pop queen status is consolidated." Martin also enjoyed Minogue's "generously sensual" vocal performance. Chris Ryan from MTV Buzzworthy termed the song "classic Kylie", praising its subtle production and the chorus for being "ecstatic, breathtaking." MuuMuse editor Bradley Stern commended Minogue's breathy delivery and felt that its instrumentation and Minogue's vocals were reminiscent of "I Believe in You". Stern rated it five out of five stars and concluded that "["All the Lovers" is] a sing-along track, it's sad disco, it's everything you've been waiting for." The Popjustice review of the song was also positive; they pointed out that it would please fans of the singer and become the "sound of dancefloor stampedes from now until the end of time" due to its mature style. Rob Harvilla from The Village Voice wrote that the song features Minogue at her peak form and labelled it a "pleasingly vapid synth-cheese jam."

Upon the release of Aphrodite, critics viewed "All the Lovers" as one of the highlights of the album. Tim Sendra from AllMusic gave the song a "Track Pick", calling it "massively catchy" and praising the synthesizer riffs in its instrumentation. Ian Wade from BBC Music found "All the Lovers" a far more superior effort than X, saying it "emits everything that X didn't." Neil McCormick from The Daily Telegraph complimented the chorus and commented "once 'All The Lovers' gets in your head, it is impossible to dislodge." Mikael Wood from Entertainment Weekly encouraged readers to download the song, terming it a "thumping opener." Helen Clarke from musicOMH likened it to the works of British electronic music duo Goldfrapp and called it a "Kylie classic", but found its placement as the opening track of the album unusual. Christel Loar from PopMatters found its synth riffs similar to those in songs by British synthpop duo Erasure and felt the song was perfect to dance to. Sal Cinquemani from Slant Magazine, who gave Aphrodite a mixed review, picked the song as one of the better tracks from the album, comparing its hook to a "summer breeze." Sophia Money-Coutts from The National called the song a "euphoric, electro tune ripe for remixing and which will no doubt have the hordes waving their hands about in Ibiza" but criticised it for being too similar to "I Believe in You".

=== Accolades and recognition ===
About.com critic Bill Lamb ranked the song number 25 on his list of "Top 100 Pop Songs of 2010", saying "'All the Lovers' sounds like a grand culmination of Kylie Minogue's international pop success." PopMatters placed "All the Lovers" at number 43 on their list of "The 60 Best Songs of 2010", with critic Jer Fairall writing "Celebratory yet wistfully elegiac, 'All the Lovers' is retro in the best possible way, Kylie's disco fetishism channelled towards its most meaningful purpose yet." Comparing it to Donna Summer's 1978 song "Last Dance" and Cher's 1998 song "Believe", the critic termed "All the Lovers" a "rare love song that acknowledges the existence of both personal and cultural history, and the euphoric realization that these are things that brought us to who and where we are now." At the 26th Annual International Dance Music Awards (IDMA) ceremony, "All the Lovers" was nominated for Best Pop Dance Track while Minogue was nominated for Best Solo Artist. At the 2011 Virgin Media Music Awards, "All the Lovers" was voted the Best Single by British music fans.

== Commercial performance ==
Commercially, "All the Lovers" underperformed in Minogue's native country Australia in comparison to lead singles from her previous albums. It entered the ARIA Singles Chart at number 14 and failed to chart inside the top 10, having reached its peak position of number 13. In total, "All the Lovers" charted for a total of nine weeks and was certified gold by the Australian Recording Industry Association (ARIA) in 2012 for completing shipments of 35,000 units.

In the United Kingdom, "All the Lovers" entered at number four on the UK Singles Chart. Two weeks later, it peaked at number three. The song spent four weeks inside the top ten of the chart and nineteen weeks inside the top hundred. In August 2010, the British Phonographic Industry (BPI) certified "All the Lovers" silver for completing shipments of 200,000 units in the United Kingdom. The certification was later updated to gold in February 2017, and later to platinum in October 2025 for sales and streaming units equivalent to 600,000 sales. The single had sold 383,000 pure sales in the country by May 2018.

Similarly, the single charted strongly throughout the rest of Europe. In Austria, it became Minogue's first single since "I Believe in You" to appear inside the top ten of the Ö3 Austria Top 40 chart after it debuted at number 10. It later peaked at number five and stayed on the chart for 20 consecutive weeks. The song entered the Ultratop chart in the French-speaking Wallonia region of Belgium at a low position of 31, but peaked at number eight two weeks later. "All the Lovers" entered and peaked at number three on the SNEP chart in France, becoming Minogue's highest-debuting single in the country. Its total stay on the chart lasted for 29 weeks. In Germany, it peaked at number 10 on the Media Control Charts for two weeks and achieved Minogue's longest charting period for a solo-single in the country, appearing for 25 weeks in total. On the Hungarian Airplay Chart, "All the Lovers" reached number two, thus tying with "In Your Eyes" as her highest-peaking single in the country. The single debuted and peaked at number six in Ireland.

In Italy, the song entered the top 20 of the FIMI Singles chart at number six. It was eventually certified gold by the Federazione Industria Musicale Italiana (FIMI) for selling 15,000 certified units. The song debuted at number 30 on the Slovak Airplay Chart and jumped to number four the next week. It appeared on the chart for a total of 20 weeks. On the PROMUSICAE chart in Spain, it peaked at number six and spent a total of 22 weeks. Similarly, it attained the same peak position in Switzerland after it debuted at number six on the Swiss Hitparade chart. It charted within the top 10 for seven non-consecutive weeks and in the top 75 for 21 weeks. In Canada, "All the Lovers" reached number 72 on the Billboard Canadian Hot 100 chart. "All the Lovers" became a club hit in the United States. During its eight-week on the US Billboard Hot Dance Club Songs chart, it peaked at number one and displaced American recording artist Kesha's song "Your Love Is My Drug" from the top spot. "All the Lovers" was the third-most-played song in American clubs in 2010.

== Music video ==
=== Development and release ===
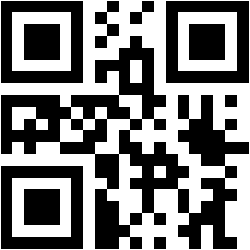
A QR code, said to produce the word "LOVE" when scanned, can be seen printed on various items in the beginning of the music video.

The accompanying music video for "All the Lovers" was directed by Joseph Kahn, who is known for having previously collaborated with American recording artist Britney Spears on the videos for her singles "Toxic" and "Womanizer". It was filmed in Downtown Los Angeles, the central business district of Los Angeles, California, in early May 2010. Aiming to pay "homage" to her large gay audience, Minogue wanted the video to express "what I'm about and what I love" and thus it was made to depict scenes of same-sex kissing. Arts and culture magazine BlackBook reported that the video, which portrays a large group of underwear-clad men and women, is a re-imagination of the installations of Spencer Tunick, an American photographer known for organising large-scale nude shoots. Minogue credited Kahn for the idea behind the video, saying "He came up with a brilliant, simple idea and executed it so sensitively, I thought. It's still cutting edge, it still gets you a little hot under the collar, but I think there's a real sensitivity."

Initially, two ideas for the storyline arose, one which was a "little gentler" and one which was "edgier", and in the end the latter option was finalised. When Kahn submitted his cut of the video to Parlophone, a person working for the label wanted it to be re-edited; however, at Minogue's interference, the original director's cut was released as intended. A country also asked for same-sex kissing to be removed from the video, but Minogue refused. In 2011, Kahn talked about working with Minogue and called her the "dream artist to work with" and a "joy to photograph", praising her ability to "understand" directors. He further commented that: "[The music video of "All the Lovers"] is one of my favourite videos I did last year, and one of my favourites ever really. The message Kylie wanted to say with this video is important, and I am lucky to have worked with her on it." A preview of the video was released on 25 May 2010 while the full version was premiered five days later. It was made available to download at the iTunes Store on 11 June 2010.

=== Synopsis and analysis ===
Still from the music video showing Minogue standing atop a pyramid of underwear-clad couples, which was inspired by the installations of American photographer Spencer Tunick

The video begins with close-up shots of several items, including a soft-drink glass, a bottle of milk, marshmallows, and pages from a briefcase, falling onto the ground. A QR code, which was said to produce the word "LOVE" when scanned, can be seen printed on the glass and bottle, and on the ground during the scene of the marshmallows falling. In their analysis of the video, Popjustice commented that the falling objects convey an environment of excitement, saying: "the general idea here is that something exciting is happening and someone is so excited by the exciting thing that they have dropped their drink." Several couples are shown removing their clothes, stripping down to their underwear, and proceeding to kiss and caress each other. Minogue then rises up from the inside of a "mountain of writhing bodies" and a flock of doves flies around them. Her attire consists of a black bra, similar to the one Madonna wore in the 1990 music video of "Vogue", wore underneath a "shredded" white top coupled with white go-go boots and knee-pads.

She continues singing the song while laying atop the pyramid of couples and changes her position as the song approaches its second verse. A convertible standing in the middle of a road is shown releasing a bunch of white balloons from its top. The scene switches back to Minogue, from where the camera pans upward to reveal a large white inflatable elephant floating in between two skyscrapers. The flash mob continues growing in size and the height of the pyramid increases. Minogue sways her hand above the participants of the mob, emphasising rings and jewellery designed by UK-based jeweller Shaun Leane. During the bridge section of the song, Minogue is pulled inside the pyramid and the lighting is dimmed down. The song's breakdown coincides with scenes of a white horse galloping on a road amid various couples kissing each other. As the chorus begins, Minogue again rises up and stands atop the pyramid, which has greatly increased in height. Popjustice pointed out that the increment in the height of the pyramid is reflective of the lines of the song in which Minogue repeats the word "higher". The camera switches to a distant view of the scene, showing the pyramid in between the skyscrapers and the floating elephant and balloons. The video ends with Minogue releasing a dove in the air.

=== Reception ===
Nick Levine from Digital Spy felt the video was unique and commented that "There aren't many popstars who could make a video featuring doves, balloons, a galloping horse, a giant inflatable elephant and a mass grope-fest in the middle of LA... and get away with it." Leah Greenblatt from Entertainment Weekly complimented its sexuality and said that the video could "best described as either a makeout flash mob, a Macy's Thanksgiving Day Parade gone wild, or some serious 'the touch, the feel of cotton' guerrilla marketing." MuuMuse-editor Bradley Stern praised the concept of the video as "incredible" and complimented the inclusion of the horse. Popjustice called the music video a "lovely pervoramic pop moment." Due to its sexual content and nature, the music video was censored and banned in numerous Asian countries, including Singapore, Malaysia, and Indonesia. In an interview with Spanish television channel Cuatro, Minogue responded to the censorship and said: "I think, yes, it's sexy but I also think it's very touching and sensual and the message is love."

== Live performances and covers ==
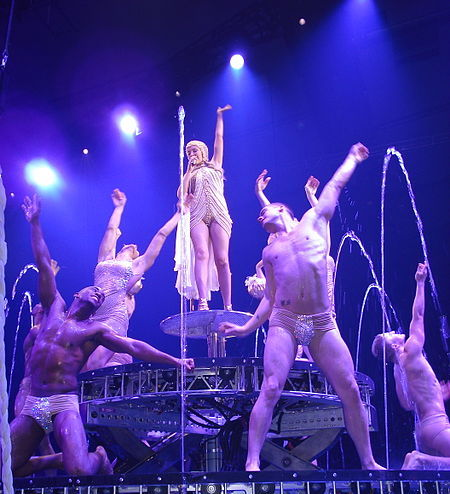
Minogue and her dancers performing "All the Lovers" as the final number of 2011's Aphrodite: Les Folies Tour

Minogue's first live performance of "All the Lovers" was at the Wind Music Awards in Italy on 29 May 2010. On 10 June, she performed the song at the finale of the fifth season of reality television show Germany's Next Topmodel. The performance was a re-enactment of the music video and Minogue started the performance standing atop a pyramid of underwear-clad dancers. At her Madrid Pride Parade concert on 6 July, Minogue performed "All the Lovers", along with "Get Outta My Way" and "Better than Today", dressed in a toga-inspired white gown and golden bodice. She performed "All the Lovers" in a red dress on British comedy chat show Alan Carr: Chatty Man on 18 July. Minogue appeared at Australian television show Hey Hey It's Saturday on 21 July to perform the single. On 25 July she sang it from atop a "dazzling" mountaintop-like platform on the tenth season of the Australian version of Dancing with the Stars. On 12 September 2010 Minogue sang "All the Lovers" and "Get Outta My Way" during the finale of Miss Italia. Minogue performed "All the Lovers", "Get Outta My Way", and "In My Arms" at the Los Premios 40 Principales awards ceremony on 10 December. On 8 September 2012, Minogue headlined at the Proms in the Park event in Hyde Park, London, to promote her orchestral compilation album The Abbey Road Sessions. At the event, she sang the orchestral version of "All the Lovers", which was included as the opening track of the album.

Beginning from early 2011, Minogue embarked on the Aphrodite: Les Folies Tour to promote Aphrodite. "All the Lovers" was included in the encore segment of the setlist and was the last performance of the shows. During the performances of the song, Minogue stood atop a rotating "three-tiered cake stage", which was "layered" with her back-up dancers, as fountains and "swirling near-naked dancers spinning on harnesses" surrounded her. The performance received positive reviews from critics. Jon O'Brien from AllMusic commented that "the euphoric glittery disco of "All the Lovers", [...] benefit[s] from a live setting." Dawn Collinson from Liverpool Echo praised the encore segment and its visuals, saying "All The Lovers took Aphrodite[: Les Folies Tour] to an incredible climax." Ina Andersson from The National Student felt that through the performance Minogue "delivers a powerful finish." Megan Buerger from The Washington Post also gave it a favourable review and concluded that "Minogue is proof that it pays to know your audience."

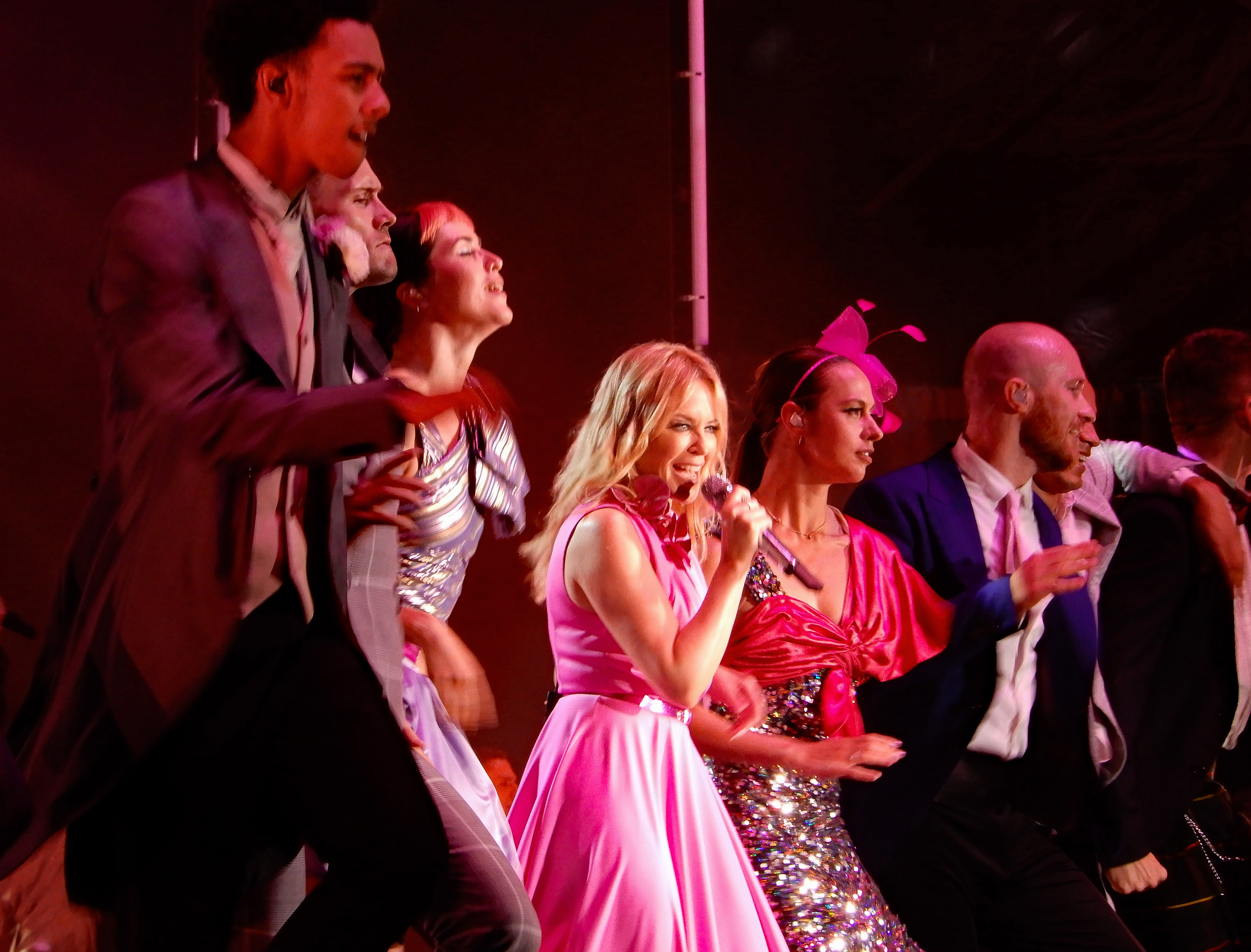
Minogue and her dancers performing "All the Lovers" during her 2019 summer tour at Castlefield Bowl

In 2014, Minogue performed "All the Lovers" as part of her seven song set at the closing ceremony of that year's Commonwealth Games. That same year, on the Kiss Me Once Tour, "All The Lovers" was the second-to-last performance of the show and featured confetti cannons raining down upon the audience. It was also included on Minogue's 2015 summer tour, where she performed dressed in a glittery red mini dress. It was performed on Minogue's Kylie Christmas concert series. In 2018–19, the song was included on Minogue's Golden Tour; it began in an acoustic style before kicking off into its "euphoric" finale. Halfway through the performance, rainbow colored confetti fell from the ceiling. Writing for news.com.au, Nick Bond felt the performance was a nod to the singer's "gay fans [who] have never abandoned her through 30 years of ups and downs". The song was then included on Minogue's 2019 summer tour, where it was one of the closing numbers. The performance featured rainbow colored confetti being blasted into the crowd and was praised by NME's Dan Stubbs as "an all-out celebration".

On 22 June 2010, American pop group Scissor Sisters performed a country-inspired version of "All the Lovers" on the Live Lounge segment of the British radio station BBC Radio 1. The group performed this version of the song for the second time at the annual Australian music festival Splendour in the Grass in Melbourne, which is Minogue's birthplace. She joined the group during the performance.

== Formats and track listings ==
European and UK 2-track CD single

1. "All the Lovers" – 3:20
2. "Go Hard or Go Home" – 3:43

European and UK CD maxi-single; Australian CD maxi-single

1. "All the Lovers" – 3:20
2. "All the Lovers" (WAWA & MMB Anthem Mix) – 6:05
3. "All the Lovers" (Michael Woods Remix) – 7:56
4. "All the Lovers" (XXXchange Remix) – 4:50
5. "All the Lovers" (Video) – 3:20

European and UK 7-inch picture disc

1. "All the Lovers" – 3:20
2. "Los Amores" – 3:20

International digital single

1. "All the Lovers" – 3:20

International digital EP

1. "All the Lovers" – 3:20
2. "All the Lovers" (WAWA & MMB Anthem Mix) – 6:05
3. "All the Lovers" (Michael Woods Remix) – 7:56
4. "All the Lovers" (XXXchange Remix) – 4:50

"Los Amores" Digital single

1. "Los Amores" – 3:20

== Credits and personnel ==
Credits are adapted from the liner notes of "All the Lovers".

- Kylie Minogue – backing vocals, lead vocals
- Jim Eliot – songwriting, production, piano, keyboards, bass and drum programming
- Mima Stilwell – songwriting, additional backing vocals
- Stuart Price – additional production, mixing
- Dave Emery – mixing assistant

== Charts ==
=== Weekly charts ===
Weekly chart performance for "All the Lovers"
| Chart (2010) | Peak position |
|---|---|
| Australia (ARIA) | 13 |
| Austria (Ö3 Austria Top 40) | 5 |
| Belgium (Ultratop 50 Flanders) | 10 |
| Belgium (Ultratop 50 Wallonia) | 8 |
| Canada Hot 100 (Billboard) | 72 |
| CIS Airplay (TopHit) | 14 |
| Croatia (HRT) | 1 |
| Czech Republic Airplay (ČNS IFPI) | 18 |
| Denmark (Tracklisten) | 26 |
| Euro Digital Songs (Billboard) | 4 |
| France (SNEP) | 3 |
| Germany (GfK) | 10 |
| Global Dance Tracks (Billboard) | 13 |
| Hungary (Rádiós Top 40) | 2 |
| Iceland (RÚV) | 6 |
| Ireland (IRMA) | 6 |
| Italy (FIMI) | 6 |
| Japan (Japan Hot 100) | 11 |
| Mexico (Billboard Ingles Airplay) | 8 |
| Netherlands (Dutch Top 40 Tipparade) | 4 |
| Netherlands (Single Top 100) | 61 |
| Poland (Polish Airplay New) | 1 |
| Romania Airplay (Media Forest) | 18 |
| Russia Airplay (TopHit) | 10 |
| Scottish Singles Sales (Official Charts) | 2 |
| Slovakia (IFPI) | 4 |
| South Korea International Singles (GAON) | 49 |
| Spain (Promusicae) | 6 |
| Sweden (Sverigetopplistan) | 33 |
| Switzerland (Schweizer Hitparade) | 6 |
| UK Singles (Official Charts) | 3 |
| US Dance Club Songs (Billboard) | 1 |
| US Dance Airplay (Billboard) | 15 |

=== Year-end charts ===
Year-end chart performance for "All the Lovers"
| Chart (2010) | Position |
|---|---|
| Austria (Ö3 Austria Top 40) | 34 |
| Belgium (Ultratop 50 Flanders) | 95 |
| Belgium (Ultratop 50 Wallonia) | 79 |
| Croatia (HRT) | 22 |
| France (SNEP) | 37 |
| Germany (Media Control Charts) | 45 |
| Hungary (Rádiós Top 40) | 18 |
| Italy (FIMI) | 59 |
| Italy Airplay (EarOne) | 33 |
| Japan Adult Contemporary (Billboard) | 26 |
| Japan Radio Songs (Billboard Japan) | 59 |
| Romania (Romanian Top 100) | 83 |
| Russia Airplay (TopHit) | 164 |
| Spain (PROMUSICAE) | 42 |
| Switzerland (Schweizer Hitparade) | 48 |
| Taiwan (Hito Radio) | 72 |
| UK Singles (OCC) | 57 |
| US Hot Dance Club Songs (Billboard) | 3 |

== Certifications ==
Certifications and sales for "All the Lovers"
| Region | Certification | Certified units/sales |
|---|---|---|
| Australia (ARIA) | Gold | 35,000^{^} |
| Italy (FIMI) | Gold | 15,000^{*} |
| United Kingdom (BPI) | Platinum | 600,000^{‡} |
^{*} Sales figures based on certification alone.^{^} Shipments figures based on certification alone.^{‡} Sales+streaming figures based on certification alone.

== See also ==
- List of number-one dance singles of 2010 (U.S.)
- List of UK top-ten singles in 2010
- List of top 10 singles in 2010 (Ireland)
- List of top 100 singles of 2010 (France)
- List of Pop Rock General number-one singles of the 2010s
