= Lasso (video sharing app) =

Video sharing app by Facebook

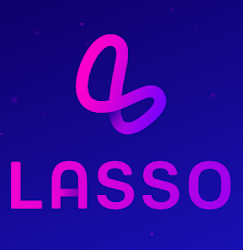
- Developer: Facebook
- Initial release: November 9, 2018; 7 years ago
- Operating system: Android, iOS
- Type: Short-form

Lasso was a short-form video sharing app developed by Facebook. Lasso was launched on iOS and Android and was aimed at teenagers.

On July 2, 2020, Facebook announced that Lasso would be shutting down July 10. It has since been shut down. Currently Lasso was merged with Instagram, to relaunch as Instagram Reels.

== Features ==
The application connected with Facebook, among other social media platforms, and allowed users to upload their short videos with music and find trending videos via Lasso's hashtag tracking.

== Competition ==
Lasso was directly competing with short video sharing app TikTok, which merged with Musical.ly in August 2018.
