= Lose Control (Kish Mauve song) =

Single by Kish Mauve

from the album Black Heart
- Released: 22 September 2008
- Genre: Electronic, electropop
- Length: 3:45
- Label: YNYS, Funkatech
- Songwriter(s): Jim Eliot, Mima Stilwell
- Producer(s): Kish Mauve

Kish Mauve singles chronology
"Modern Love" (2006)	"Lose Control" (2008)	""Come On" / "Morphine"" (2009)

"Lose Control" is a song performed by British electronic duo Kish Mauve. The song was written and produced by Kish Mauve for their debut album Black Heart (2009). It was released as a single on 22 September 2008 by YNYS Recordings. The song was originally written for Australian singer Kylie Minogue. Minogue recorded the song, but it did not appear on her 2007 album X. On 23 February 2009, NAPT released their remixes of the song as a digital download and 12-inch single.

== Formats and track listings ==
These are the formats and track listings of major single releases of "Lose Control".

Digital download
(Released 22 September 2008)

1. "Lose Control" – 3:45
2. "Lose Control" (Fred Falke remix) – 8:14
3. "Lose Control" (Michael Morph remix) – 8:42
4. "Lose Control" (Chewy Chocolate Cookies remix) – 5:24
5. "Lose Control" (Neoteric remix) – 7:11
6. "Lose Control" (Superbass extended remix) – 5:12
7. "Lose Control" (Superbass radio edit remix) – 4:09
8. "Lose Control" (Sei A remix) – 7:10
9. "Lose Control" (Stockholm Syndrome remix) – 7:29
10. "Lose Control" (Kish Mauve White Noise remix) – 5:57
11. "Lose Control" (Kish Mauve extended remix) – 4:44
12. "Lose Control" (Stockholm Syndrome radio edit remix) – 3:30
13. "Lose Control" (Fred Falke radio edit remix) – 3:39

NAPT vs. Kish Mauve digital download
(Released 23 February 2009)

1. "Lose Control" (12" dub mix) – 7:00
2. "Lose Control" (Vocal mix) – 6:30

NAPT vs. Kish Mauve 12-inch single
(FTECH #031, Released 6 April 2009)

1. "Lose Control" (12" dub mix) – 7:00
2. "Lose Control" (Vocal mix) – 6:30
