= Process Lasso =

Windows software

- Interface of Process Lasso version 16.1.0
- Developer: Bitsum LLC (Jeremy Collake)
- Stable release: v15.0.4.22 / January 6, 2025; 10 months ago
- Operating system: Windows 7, Windows 8, Windows 10, Windows 11
- Type: Utility software
- License: Freemium
- Website: bitsum.com

Process Lasso is Windows process automation and optimization software developed by Jeremy Collake of Bitsum Technologies. It features a graphical user interface that allows for automating various process-related tasks, and several novel algorithms to control how processes are run.

The original and headline algorithm is ProBalance, which works to retain system responsiveness during high CPU loads by dynamically adjusting process priority classes. More recently, algorithms such as the CPU Limiter, Instance Balancer, and Group Extender were added. These algorithms help to control how processes are allocated to CPU cores. Numerous additional automation capabilities exist, including disallowed processes and application power plans.

The paid (Pro) version has some extra features, such as the ability to run the core engine (Process Governor) as a system service.

== Features ==
Among this program's features are the following:

- ProBalance - Dynamic priority and affinity optimization
- Persistent priorities and CPU affinities
- Performance Mode - A maximum performance mode that disables CPU core parking and frequency scaling
- Process Watchdog - Advanced IFTTT rules
- CPU Limiter - Limit Application CPU Use
- Instance Balancer - Spread application instances across CPU cores
- Instance Count Limits - Limit number of running application instances
- Power Profile Automation - Switch power plans when application is run
- Disallow Processes - Prohibit select processes from running
- Keep Running - Automatically restart processes that terminate
- Responsiveness Metric - Novel algorithm to measure system responsiveness
- SmartTrim - Selective, threshold-based virtual memory trimming
- Stand-Alone Background Core Engine (Governor)
- Group Extender - Enable group unaware apps to use more than 64 CPU cores
- Available in IA-32(bit) and x86-64(bit) builds

Users who take advantage of the programs advanced features; such as assigning persistent priority class and CPU affinities to services or programs which are CPU intensive should fully familiarize themselves with Process Lasso's documentation. While optimizing and parking specific services and programs CPU cores and fine tuning priority classes can enhance system performance; a user could lock their system into "full load" by incorrectly elevating a service or program which makes use of multi-threading; where by the program can make the system; including mouse and keyboard actions non-responsive.

== Reception ==
The program was featured on FreewareBB, and received an "Excellent" rating from Softpedia, as well as a certification for containing no malware.
The application has a 4.63 rating (out of a possible 5) at MajorGeeks.com.
Editors at CNET gave it 'Outstanding', 4.5 of a possible 5 stars.
