= NAPT (DJs) =

English band

- Origin: London, England
- Genres: Electronic, house, breaks
- Labels: Nest HQ, Fool's Gold Records, Red Sugar Records, Rising Music
- Members: Tomek Naden
- Past members: Ashley Pope
- Website: www.napt-music.com

NAPT (pronounced N-A-P-T) is an English electronic dance music production and DJ duo.

== Career ==
Initially consisting of Ashley Pope and Tomek Naden, in 2010, the duo collaborated with English grime rapper Bashy to release "Make My Day" with Louise Marshall providing the vocals on the chorus.

NAPT were signed to A-Trak's Fool's Gold Records, Chris Lake's Rising Music and Sony International. NAPT's releases are supported by international DJ stars including GTA, Laidback Luke, Skrillex, Tiesto, DJ Zinc, Treasure Fingers, Smutlee, Michael Woods, The Aston Shuffle, Nick Thayer, B.Traits, Don Diablo and played across specialist radio shows including Pete Tong, Danny Howard and Annie Mac on BBC Radio 1.

NAPT released The Dockers EP and the Come Like This EP via Skrillex's Owsla sub-label Nest.

== Chart positions ==
Year	Title	Chart Position		
Year	Title	UK	UK Indie	AUS Club
2010	"Make My Day" (Bashy vs. NAPT)	118	8	4
