= Kish Mauve =

British Electro Pop Group

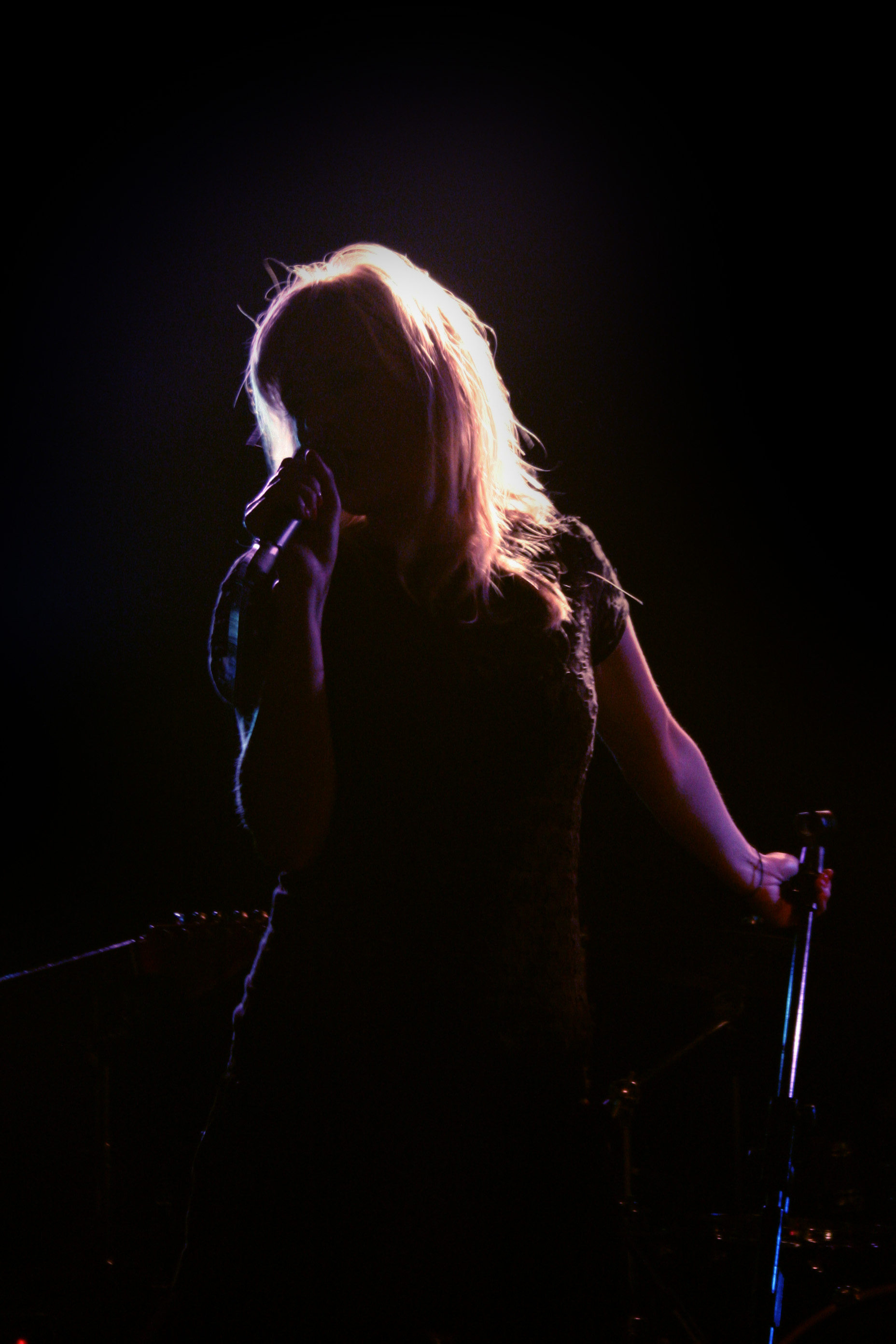
- Kish Mauve's Mima Stilwell performing in London, 2006

Background information
- Origin: London, England
- Genres: Electropop, synthpop, indie pop, dance-pop, electroclash
- Years active: 2005–present
- Labels: Unsigned; published by Sony/ATV
- Members: Mima Stilwell; Jim Eliot

Kish Mauve is a British electropop group. The group was formed in 2005 in London, England, and consists of Mima Stilwell (vocals) and Jim Eliot (synthesizer, vocals).

== Career ==
The group released their debut extended play, Kish Mauve EP, in July 2005 through Sunday Best Recordings, including the song "Two Hearts", which was later recorded by Australian singer Kylie Minogue for her album X (2007). They released their debut album, Black Heart, in March 2009 on their own label, YNYS Recordings.

Kish Mauve's music has been featured in multiple television shows and advertisements. Several of their songs appeared on the United States television series Dirty Sexy Money, the song "Can't Get Enough" was featured in a Rimmel commercial, and Dell used their version of "2 Hearts" in a computer advertisement.

The group are particularly well known for their collaborations with Kylie Minogue. In 2007, the duo produced Minogue's cover version of their song "2 Hearts", which was released as the lead single to X. It reached number one in Australia and number four in the United Kingdom. Minogue also co-wrote on "You Make Me Feel", a track recorded and released by Kish Mauve when it did not make it to the final cut for X. In 2010, they again wrote and co-produced a single for Minogue, "All the Lovers"; released as the first single from Minogue's eleventh studio album, Aphrodite, it peaked at number three in the UK.

Stilwell and Eliot also contributed to Will Young's fifth studio album, Echoes, released in 2011. Six songs co-written with Young are featured on Echoes, including the lead single, "Jealousy"; also appearing on the album is a cover of their 2009 single "Come On". Kish Mauve worked with Sophie Ellis-Bextor on tracks to feature on her fourth studio album, Make a Scene (2011), but none of these tracks made the final cut. Jim Eliot worked with Ladyhawke and Rosie and the Goldbug on their respective debut albums, Ladyhawke and Rosie and the Goldbug (both 2008), and with Ellie Goulding on her second studio album, Halcyon (2012). He has written and produced material for Little Boots, Girls Aloud, Rae Morris, Rosanna Munter, and Olly Murs.

== Discography ==
=== Studio albums ===
- Black Heart (2009)

=== Extended plays ===
- Kish Mauve EP (2005)

=== Singles ===
- "Modern Love" (2006)
- "Lose Control" (2008)
- "Come On" / "Morphine" (2009)
