= Two Hearts (Kish Mauve song) =

2005 song by Kish Mauve

Song by Kish Mauve

from the album Kish Mauve
- Released: 11 July 2005
- Genre: Glam rock; electro-rock
- Length: 2:56
- Label: Sunday Best
- Songwriters: Jim Eliot; Mima Stilwell
- Producer: Kish Mauve

Kish Mauve track listing
- 3 tracks: 1. "Two Hearts"; 2. "Lover"; 3. "Come On"

Audio video
- "Two Hearts" on YouTube

"Two Hearts", alternatively titled "2 Hearts", is a song first recorded by British electronic duo Kish Mauve, written for their 2005 self-titled extended play and later re-recorded by Australian singer Kylie Minogue for her tenth studio album, X (2007). Both versions were written and produced by Jim Eliot and Mima Stilwell. Minogue's version was released on 9 November 2007 by Parlophone as the album's lead single. The song was Minogue's first commercial single since "Giving You Up" (2005), as she was diagnosed with breast cancer in May 2005. After the announcement, Minogue took a hiatus between of two years to recover from her illness.

"2 Hearts" features instrumentation of electric guitars, guitars, drums, keyboards and piano riffs. The song also features "whooo"'s towards the chorus. Upon Minogue's release, "2 Hearts" received mixed reviews from music critics, who compared it to the works of Goldfrapp. The song was praised for its departure of musical content and the song's strength; however, the song received criticism for its production and for not living up to expectations.

Commercially, the song was successful worldwide. It managed to top the spot in Minogue's native Australia and in Spain, while peaking inside the top ten in several countries, including Italy, Norway, Sweden, Switzerland, and the United Kingdom. Though the song was released in North America, it did not manage to chart on any component Billboard charts in the United States, but it did chart in Canada, peaking at number 60. The music video for "2 Hearts" was directed by Dawn Shadforth and filmed at Shepperton Studios in London, England. It features Minogue performing the song on a stage, where she dances on a piano and features the band playing along with the song.

Additionally, the song was featured on three of Minogue's tours. The song was first performed on her KylieX2008 Tour, where she played as an 'erotic bellboy'. The stage featured a green set, with a gigantic skull behind her. The song was also featured on her North American tour For You, for Me, where it was featured in the middle of the setlist. The song was then added to the setlist of her Aphrodite World Tour, where it was performed in Japan only.

== Kish Mauve version ==
The British electronic duo Kish Mauve consists of Mima Stilwell and Jim Eliot. Both wrote and produced "Two Hearts" for their 2005 extended play Kish Mauve, released by Sunday Best. Paul Lester considered in a review for The Guardian their song "Lose Control" to be "far better" than "Two Hearts". An opinion from the magazine Out claims "There's a definite happy-sad contradiction in the writing, so the songs feel emotional and stirring". "Two Hearts" was used in a Dell Inc. advertisement.

== Kylie Minogue version ==
"2 Hearts"

Single by Kylie Minogue

from the album X
- B-side: "I Don't Know What It Is"; "King or Queen"
- Released: 10 October 2007
- Studio: Olympic, Stanley House (London, England)
- Genre: Glam rock; electro-rock
- Length: 2:53
- Label: Parlophone; Mushroom
- Songwriters: Jim Eliot; Mima Stilwell
- Producer: Kish Mauve

Kylie Minogue singles chronology
"Giving You Up" (2005)	"2 Hearts" (2007)	"Wow" (2008)

Music video
- "2 Hearts" on YouTube

"Two Hearts" was later covered by Australian singer Kylie Minogue for her tenth studio album X (2007), being retitled "2 Hearts". It was released as the lead single from X on 10 October 2007, by Parlophone.

=== Background and release ===
After performing in Europe and the United Kingdom with her Showgirl: The Greatest Hits Tour, Minogue was scheduled to perform in Australia and Asia. However, on 17 May 2005, Minogue was diagnosed with breast cancer at age 36. This led her management to postpone the remainder of the tour and her appearance to the Glastonbury Festival. She was hospitalized in Melbourne so treatment could go ahead, but this led to a brief but intense period of media coverage, particularly in Australia. Minogue underwent surgery on 21 May 2005 at Cabrini Hospital in Malvern, and soon after commenced chemotherapy treatment.

After recovering from her diagnosis, Minogue began writing lyrics towards the end of her cancer treatment in mid 2006, having not worked on any music for the previous year. Due to the recovery time following her cancer, X was the first album Minogue had consciously prepared for the recording of, having previously been engaged for much of her career in an endless cycle of record, release and tour. After she was clear of the disease, Minogue resumed her tour, entitled Showgirl: Homecoming Tour. She first performed in Sydney, with reworks of the dance routines as well as new costumes and outfits for the show. In January 2007, Minogue performed several dates in London and Manchester.

After recovering from breast cancer, Minogue had started recording material for the production of X. She first started recording tracks in London, England for the studio album. "2 Hearts" was offered by Kish Mauve to Minogue. Commenting on it, Minogue said that she "loved it from the moment [she] heard" the song. She also described the recording sessions with Kish Mauve as "a joy". With additional production of Kish Mauve, they had also produced another track, "Lose Control".

Her new single "2 Hearts" and its remixes were leaked onto file sharing websites on 9 October 2007. It premiered on British radio the day after. "2 Hearts" was released in various formats throughout the world. While most territories received a CD single and digital download release, the song was also released as a limited edition vinyl single in the United Kingdom. The song was promotionally released in New Zealand as a CD single, where fans got free copies, due to the promotion of Minogue's film White Diamond.

=== Recording and composition ===
"2 Hearts"
A sample of the song "2 Hearts"

"2 Hearts" is a glam rock and electro-rock record. Its instrumentation consists of electric guitars, guitars, drums, keyboards and piano riffs. The song also features "whooo"'s towards its chorus. In the verses, the song follows the chord progression Am-D-G. In the chorus, it follows the progression F-Dm7-Am-C.

=== Critical response ===
Upon its release, "2 Hearts" received mixed reviews from contemporary music critics. Tom Ewing from Pitchfork Media compared the song to the music of Goldfrapp, and wrote that "it's an unexpected stylistic move" and "it plays to her strengths". Chris True from Allmusic highlighted the song as an album standout. Alexis Petridis from The Guardian said the song "offers a winning glam, piano-driven stomp." Evan Sawdey from PopMatters was very positive towards the song, saying "From the sexy bass that sets up the opening track "2 Hearts", it's obvious that she's not only going to go back to her disco sex-kitten persona [...] "2 Hearts"—aside from being one of her best singles in years—makes for an incredible album opener." Though Dave Hughes from Slant Magazine said that "2 Hearts" "serviceable rip of Goldfrapp's glammier slinks, kicks things off well" he felt that Minogue was playing it too safe. The Boston Globe highlighted the song as the album's best track, and said ""2 Hearts," the glammy lead track, is the heaviest song here, musically speaking, and also the freshest, even though the stomping, swaggering gem is a blast from the Marc Bolan-esque past."

However, the song also received negative reviews from music critics. Sarah Walters of the Manchester Evening News was less impressed, commenting that "it takes more than a bunch of singable wooh's to maketh the memorable single". Drowned in Sound reviewer Alex Denney called "2 Hearts" a "disappointment", stating that "it's a genetic three-way splice of the burlesque chic Christina Aguilera's been peddling for the last 12 months to a worldwide chorus of mehs, Alison Goldfrapp's vampish electro shtick and, quite literally, Feist's "1234".

Rolling Stone ranked "2 Hearts" at number 94 on its list of the Top 100 Songs of 2007, even though the song had not been released in the United States. The song also ranked at number 40 on Stylus Magazine's Top 50 Songs of 2007.

=== Chart performance ===
In Minogue's native Australia, the song debuted at number one on the Australian Singles Chart, becoming her first number one since "Slow" and her tenth number one overall. It stayed in the charts for 13 weeks. Although it was the lowest-selling number one of Australia in 2007, it received a Gold certification from ARIA in 2008 for sales of at least 35,000 copies. The song was not as successful in New Zealand, where it debuted at number 34 then left the chart the next week. The song then re-entered at number 38 due to the copies given at the premiere of her film White Diamond: A Personal Portrait of Kylie Minogue. This was her last single to chart until "Higher" and her last solo single until "Timebomb". The song was not successful in Canada as well, where it only charted at number 60 for a sole week. In Sweden, the song debuted at number 39, then peaked at number three for two consecutive weeks. It was Minogue's highest single since "Can't Get You Out of My Head".

"2 Hearts" was successful elsewhere. It debuted on the UK Singles Chart at number 12 on 11 November 2007, based solely on digital download sales. It reached a peak position of number four on 19 November 2007, and remained in the top 75 for a total of 13 weeks. "2 Hearts" debuted at number 29 on the Irish Singles Chart, a week before its physical single release. The track reached a peak position of number 12 in Ireland the following week, and remained in the top 50 for seven weeks. Outside the British Isles, the song became a number-one hit in Spain, debuting at the top spot on 18 November 2007 and staying in the top 20 for 10 non-consecutive weeks. In Italy, the song debuted at number 10 on the Italian Singles Chart, then peaked at number two the next week. The song also charted in several other European countries, including Austria, Belgium, Denmark, France, the Netherlands, and Switzerland.

=== Music video ===
The music video for "2 Hearts" was directed by Dawn Shadforth and filmed at Shepperton Studios in Surrey, England in September 2007. The video features Minogue in 2 different scenes: dressed in a black latex catsuit, red lipstick and curly blonde hair performing with her band & another scene where she has a plain black dress, and in a darker, more mysterious environment. It begins with Minogue singing into a microphone on top of a piano. The video concludes with Minogue and her band performing on a stage with multi-colored confetti falling around them.

Minogue drew inspiration from London nightclub BoomBox, where she DJed during London Fashion Week. The costumes worn by Minogue and her band were designed by Gareth Pugh and Christopher Kane. The video premiered on GMTV on 10 October 2007.

"2 Hearts" was used in promotional advertisements for the ABC sitcom Cougar Town starring Courteney Cox. and was included in the Brazilian soap opera Duas Caras.

=== Formats and track listings ===
- Benelux, European and UK 2-track CD single
1. "2 Hearts" – 2:53
2. "I Don't Know What It Is" – 3:17
- European, Taiwan and UK CD maxi-single
1. "2 Hearts" – 2:53
2. "2 Hearts" (Alan Braxe Remix) – 4:53
3. "King or Queen" – 2:38
4. "2 Hearts" (Video) – 2:53
- Australian CD maxi-single
1. "2 Hearts" – 2:53
2. "2 Hearts" (Alan Braxe Remix) – 4:53
3. "King or Queen" – 2:38
4. "I Don't Know What It Is" – 3:17
5. "2 Hearts" (Video) – 2:53
- European and UK 12-inch picture disc
1. "2 Hearts" – 2:53
2. "2 Hearts" (Alan Braxe Remix) – 4:53
3. "2 Hearts" (Studio Remix) – 7:35
- Digital download 1
1. "2 Hearts" – 2:54
2. "I Don't Know What It Is" – 3:17
3. "2 Hearts" (Harris & Masterson Extended Mix) – 4:24
- Digital download 2
1. "2 Hearts" (Alan Braxe Remix) – 4:54
2. "King or Queen" – 2:37
3. "2 Hearts" (Studio Remix) – 7:36
- Australian digital EP
1. "2 Hearts" – 2:53
2. "2 Hearts" (Alan Braxe Remix) – 4:53
3. "King or Queen" – 2:38
4. "I Don't Know What It Is" – 3:17

=== Personnel ===
The following people contributed to "2 Hearts":

- Kylie Minogue – lead vocals
- Kish Mauve – production
- Dave Bascombe – mixing
- Geoff Pesche – mastering

=== Charts ===
==== Weekly charts ====
Chart (2007)	Peak position
Australia (ARIA)	1
Austria (Ö3 Austria Top 40)	14
Belgium (Ultratop 50 Flanders)	25
Belgium (Ultratop 50 Wallonia)	25
Canada Hot 100 (Billboard)	60
CIS Airplay (TopHit)	50
Czech Republic Airplay (ČNS IFPI)	17
Denmark (Tracklisten)	14
Euro Digital Songs (Billboard)	5
European Hot 100 Singles (Billboard)	3
France (SNEP)	15
Germany (GfK)	13
Global Dance Tracks (Billboard)	33
Hungary (Rádiós Top 40)	26
Ireland (IRMA)	12
Italy (FIMI)	2
Netherlands (Dutch Top 40)	31
Netherlands (Single Top 100)	29
New Zealand (Recorded Music NZ)	34
Norway (VG-lista)	6
Quebec (ADISQ)	13
Romania (Romanian Top 100)	18
Russia Airplay (TopHit)	80
Scottish Singles Sales (Official Charts)	4
Slovakia Airplay (ČNS IFPI)	7
Spain (Promusicae)	1
Sweden (Sverigetopplistan)	3
Switzerland (Schweizer Hitparade)	10
UK Singles (Official Charts)	4
UK Singles Downloads (Official Charts)	6

==== Year-end charts ====
Chart (2007)	Position
Australia (ARIA)	81
UK Singles (OCC)	77

Chart (2008)	Position
European Hot 100 Singles (Billboard)	62

=== Certifications ===
Region	Certification	Certified units/sales
Australia (ARIA)	Gold	35,000^{^}
France	—	11,860
^{^} Shipments figures based on certification alone.

=== Release history ===
Release dates and formats for "2 Hearts"
Region	Date	Format(s)	Label(s)	Ref.
Australia	10 October 2007	Radio airplay	Warner Music Australia	
Australia	5 November 2007	Digital download	Warner Music Australia	
Germany	9 November 2007	CD; digital download; maxi CD	EMI	
Australia	12 November 2007	Maxi CD	Warner Music Australia	
Belgium	12 November 2007	CD	EMI	
France	12 November 2007	12-inch vinyl; CD; maxi CD	Capitol	
United Kingdom	12 November 2007	12-inch vinyl; CD; maxi CD	Parlophone	
