= Mima Stilwell =

English singer

Mima Stilwell is an English singer, and part of the pop group Kish Mauve. She co-wrote and recorded, with Jim Eliot, "Two Hearts", a song that was covered by Kylie Minogue and that reached number one on the Australian music charts in 2007.
