= Put Your Hands Up (If You Feel Love) =

2011 single by Kylie Minogue

- Digital artwork

Single by Kylie Minogue

from the album Aphrodite
- B-side: "Silence"
- Released: 29 May 2011
- Recorded: February 2010
- Genre: Dance-pop; electropop
- Length: 3:38
- Label: Parlophone
- Songwriters: Finlay Dow-Smith; Miriam Nervo; Olivia Nervo
- Producers: Starsmith; Stuart Price; Nervo

Kylie Minogue singles chronology
"Better than Today" (2010)	"Put Your Hands Up (If You Feel Love)" (2011)	"Timebomb" (2012)

Lyric video
- "Put Your Hands Up" on YouTube

"Put Your Hands Up (If You Feel Love)" is a song recorded by Australian singer Kylie Minogue for her eleventh studio album, Aphrodite (2010). The song was released as the fourth and final single from the album on 29 May 2011. Its release was heralded by the Pete Hammond remix, published on YouTube months before as promotion for the album and Minogue's Aphrodite World Tour. Initially scheduled to be part of the tour edition of her Aphrodite album, the single was first released in Japan on 29 May 2011 as a digital bundle including a new track called "Silence".

On 3 June 2011, the same bundle and a second remixes-only bundle were released in Europe. The same digital bundles were released in Australia, as well as an exclusive limited-edition CD single which includes two versions of album track "Cupid Boy". The tracks on the CD were also released digitally, making a total of three different digital bundles released in Minogue's native country, all on 3 June 2011. The artwork used for most bundles features a picture of Minogue posing with one of the Dolce & Gabbana costumes designed specifically for her tour. The CD artwork was completely different, using a picture from the album artwork photo sessions.

== Background ==
"Put Your Hands Up" was written by Finlay Dow-Smith and sisters Miriam and Olivia Nervo. It was co-produced by Dow-Smith (under his stage name Starsmith) and Stuart Price. When asked about the creation of the song, Starsmith said he penned the track with the Nervo sisters in a night. The sisters later stated that they "didn't really have anyone in mind" when they wrote the song, but as they continued, the track "[matured] into a Kylie-esque song". After writing was finished, Starsmith and the Nervo twins offered the track to Parlophone Records for inclusion on Minogue's Aphrodite album. Parlophone approved; "Put You Hands Up" was picked for the album. Subsequently, they were invited to a studio session with Minogue and Price in late February 2010. Starsmith described the process:

"... [It] was amazing. Kylie was there, and ready to cut the vocals, and her and Stuart were working pretty solidly at the time. Stuart had the executive producer role on the album, and he was more over there to oversee what I was doing. So, after Kylie cut her vocals, we spent two days in the studio together, cutting up some parts and making sure he was happy... [There was] a huge amount of pressure when I went in. It was so nerve-wracking. I wasn't just going in with Kylie; I was going in with my hero as well, production wise. The Nervo Sisters were sticking to Kylie, and I was sticking to Stuart. It was amazing when we combined. It was such a long day, but we got so much done. It was a very memorable session."

Meriam Nervo also commented on the experience:

"... [Kylie Minogue is] the kindest, sweetest, most professional yet approachable artist and person... I'm just so thankful that we got the opportunity to work with her and record with her, because she is just supreme. She makes me so happy and honoured to be Australian."

== Release ==
In a March 2011 interview with PerthNow, Minogue talked about her disappointment with the singles from Aphrodite:

"It's confusing. I felt a little let down with my releases from Aphrodite,... I was caught out like a lot of artists were, with record companies figuring out how to do single releases these days. I remember doing a promo for one of the last singles and it just felt really old-fashioned. I'm pretty computer-savvy, something didn't feel right, but no one said anything to me."

Because of her perceived failure of "Better than Today" and "Get Outta My Way", Minogue also announced there would be no more singles released from the album. Eventually, on 27 April 2011, Astralwerks (Minogue's North American record label) contravened her earlier statement regarding the end of single releases from the album, announcing that "Put Your Hands Up (If You Feel Love)" would be officially released as a digital single on 31 May 2011, later pushing the date back to 7 June 2011. Minogue's main label Parlophone Records then set release date for two extended plays for sale on 5 June 2011. The artwork for the digital bundles was unveiled on the day of the announcement of the single release. The gold body costume, like all the costumes for Minogue's Aphrodite World Tour, was designed by famed Italian designers Dolce & Gabbana and can be seen under several garments and costume changes during the show, as well as photo galleries of both the singer and the designers.

"Put Your Hands Up" was notably remixed by former PWL Records remixer Pete Hammond. It is a part of a collection of remixes Hammond has made since 2008 ("Boyfriend") to emulate his works from his tenure at PWL. When asked in an interview with The Village Voice about the creation process for the remix, Hammond explained that he offered his services as reciprocation:

"... [Part-time Pete Waterman Entertainment employee] Ian Usher had been badgering [Parlophone employee] Elias Christidis to do [a Minogue/Hammond remix], but nothing came of it. Out of the blue, I emailed [Christidis] saying, 'In return for the "Boyfriend" remix, which has given me a string of work for the past three years, I'll do you [a remix] for nothing.' It took me about two weeks to do it, from start to finish."

He then continued about submitting the remix:

"... [I] submitted [the remix] and then I heard nothing for a few weeks. I figured they didn't like it. I thought it sounded great, personally. And then I got word eventually from [Christidis] that they liked it and that they were going to take it out to serve to [Minogue] where she was on tour, to play it for her personally. Another two weeks went by and then I heard from [Christidis] saying, '[Minogue] absolutely loves it and wants to do a video and put it on her website.'."

== Critical reception ==
"Put Your Hands Up (If You Feel Love)" has received mostly positive reviews from music critics. Jordan Richardson from Seattlepi gave it a warm review. He said "Put Your Hands Up (If You Feel Love) is a concert hit waiting to happen. Its addictive chorus and warm verses bounce with cotton candy care (yeah, I said it) and her glee is impossible to miss." BBC Music said that "Put Your Hands Up" is particularly "catchy." Chuck Campbell said that "they stick with the electronic/dance theme – an exuberant anthem for "Put Your Hands Up (If You Feel Love).". The List however called the song a "half-hearted attempt to enthuse a crowd" and wondering if "she wrote [it] sitting in front of the television in her pyjamas watching Songs of Praise. It's also one of those songs in which Kylie insists on singing all the vocal parts – a kind of creepy pop tune equivalent of the multiplying Oompa Loompas scene in the remake of Charlie and the Chocolate Factory". The New Zealand Herald used the song's title to comment on how much the singer's fans seem to be willing to pay for tickets to see her live shows but not to pay for legal downloads or physical formats of the album. Andrew Grear from GayNZ.com said "The chorus to Put Your Hands Up (If You Feel Love) would sound cliché and hackneyed in less capable hands, but Kylie pulls it off with an innocent charm."

The lead version of the single release was the Pete Hammond remix, was more universally praised for its 1980s retro sound. Perez Hilton called is "epic" and praised its engineer "legendary" Hammond while Ben Gilbert for Yahoo! Music praised his unique take on the song using the "often overlooked unbridled glee of that decade's pop".

== Chart performance ==
"Put Your Hands Up" lasted one week in the majority of the charts it entered, including Australia, Austria and the United Kingdom. During the chart week of 19 June 2011, the single entered the ARIA Singles Chart at number 50. Despite being the second highest-charting single from Aphrodite in the country, this is Minogue's lowest peak in the top half of the chart since "GBI: German Bold Italic" in 1998. It is also her shortest time span on the chart since the aforementioned single. "Put Your Hands Up" entered the Ö3 Austria Top 75 on 19 June 2011 at number 38. It assumes the role of her shortest time span on the chart since "Your Disco Needs You" in 2001. On 18 June 2011, the single debuted on the UK Singles Chart at number 93, dropping out of it the following week. This not only marks Minogue's lowest entrance point onto the chart since 2007 ("Santa Baby", number 93), it also marks her lowest peak and her shortest week span on the chart.

"Put Your Hands Up" sported different results in Belgium and the United States. It entered Belgium's Ultratip Flanders chart at number 48 on 11 June 2011. On 25 June 2011, it peaked at number 36, falling out a week later. In America, "Put Your Hands Up" was labeled the "Hot Shot Debut", entering Hot Dance Club Songs at number 41 on the issue date of 9 July 2011. After rising on the chart for two months, it took the number one spot on the issue date of 3 September 2011. This brings the total count of number ones on this chart by Minogue to 8, including 5 consecutive releases. In addition to that, it means all of the singles released from her Aphrodite album have achieved a number one spot on this chart, a first for Minogue.

== Live performances and promotion ==
"Put Your Hands Up (If You Feel Love)" was performed as last song on the set list before the encores in all the legs of Minogue's Aphrodite World Tour. A live version of this song recorded at The O2 Arena was released in the single's first digital bundle. There is no official music video for the song, although a video of the song's lyrics was uploaded to Minogue's website on 22 March 2011. It uses the Pete Hammond remix of the song, and was accompanied by the following message: "Thank you all for making 'Aphrodite: Les Folies' such an amazing experience for me. Those of you who have been to a show will know that 'Put Your Hands Up' goes off! So as a tour thank you I wanted to share this 80′s-tastic remix by the legendary Pete Hammond. Enjoy!!".

== Track listings ==
Digital single

1. "Put Your Hands Up (If You Feel Love)" – 3:38
2. "Put Your Hands Up (If You Feel Love)" (Pete Hammond Remix) – 7:54
3. "Put Your Hands Up (If You Feel Love)" (Basto's Major Mayhem Edit) – 3:00
4. "Put Your Hands Up (If You Feel Love)" (Live from Aphrodite/Les Folies) – 3:49
5. "Silence" – 3:42

Australian CD single

1. "Put Your Hands Up (If You Feel Love)" – 3:39
2. "Put Your Hands Up (If You Feel Love)" (Pete Hammond Radio Edit) – 3:35
3. "Put Your Hands Up (If You Feel Love)" (Pete Hammond Remix) – 7:55
4. "Cupid Boy" (Live From London) – 5:34
5. "Cupid Boy" (Stereogamous Vocal Mix) – 7:00

== Remixes ==
Pete Hammond Mixes

- "Put Your Hands Up (If You Feel Love)" (Pete Hammond Remix) – 7:54
- "Put Your Hands Up (If You Feel Love)" (Pete Hammond Edit) – 4:37

Nervo Mixes

- "Put Your Hands Up (If You Feel Love)" (Nervo Hands Up Club Mix) – 7:00
- "Put Your Hands Up (If You Feel Love)" (Nervo Hands Up Radio Edit) – 4:52

Bimbo Jones Mixes

- "Put Your Hands Up (If You Feel Love)" (Bimbo Jones Remix) – 6:02
- "Put Your Hands Up (If You Feel Love)" (Bimbo Jones Radio Edit) – 3:23

Basto Mixes

- "Put Your Hands Up (If You Feel Love)" (Basto's Major Mayhem Mix) – 5:22
- "Put Your Hands Up (If You Feel Love)" (Basto's Major Mayhem Edit) – 3:00
- "Put Your Hands Up (If You Feel Love)" (Basto's Major Mayhem Dub) – 5:50

Muscles Mix

- "Put Your Hands Up (If You Feel Love)" (Muscles Club Mix) – 5:08

Retromatik Mix

- "Put Your Hands Up (If You Feel Love)" (Retromatik Remix) – 5:16

== Credits and personnel ==
"Put Your Hands Up (If You Feel Love)"

- Starsmith – writer, producer
- Miriam Nervo – writer
- Olivia Nervo – writer
- Stuart Price – co-producer
- Kylie Minogue – vocals

"Silence" (B-side)

- Kylie Minogue – vocals
- Stuart Price – writer, co-producer
- Chris Bruce – writer
- Henry Samuel – writer

"Cupid Boy" (B-side)

- Kylie Minogue - vocals
- Sebastian Ingrosso – writer, producer
- Magnus Lidehäll – writer, producer
- Nick Clow – writer
- Luciana Caporaso – writer
- Stuart Price – producer

== Charts ==
=== Weekly charts ===
Chart (2011)	Peak position
Australia (ARIA)	50
Austria (Ö3 Austria Top 40)	38
Belgium (Ultratip Bubbling Under Flanders)	36
CIS Airplay (TopHit) Pete Hammond Remix Edit	123
Global Dance Tracks (Billboard)	31
Slovakia Airplay (ČNS IFPI)	56
UK Singles (Official Charts)	93
US Dance Club Songs (Billboard)	1

=== Year-end chart ===
Chart (2011)	Position
US Hot Dance Club Songs (Billboard)	11

== Release history ==
List of release dates, record label and format details
Country	Date	Format	Label
Denmark	29 May 2011	Digital EP 1	EMI
France	29 May 2011	Digital EP 1	EMI
Germany	29 May 2011	Digital EP 1	EMI
Ireland	29 May 2011	Digital EP 1	EMI
Japan	29 May 2011	Digital EP 1	EMI
Mexico	29 May 2011	Digital EP 1	EMI
United Kingdom	29 May 2011	Digital EP 1	Parlophone
Denmark	3 June 2011	The Remixes digital EP	EMI
France	3 June 2011	The Remixes digital EP	EMI
Germany	3 June 2011	The Remixes digital EP	EMI
Ireland	3 June 2011	The Remixes digital EP	EMI
Japan	3 June 2011	The Remixes digital EP	EMI
Mexico	3 June 2011	The Remixes digital EP	EMI
Austria	3 June 2011	Digital EP 1, The Remixes digital EP	EMI
Belgium	3 June 2011	Digital EP 1, The Remixes digital EP	EMI
Finland	3 June 2011	Digital EP 1, The Remixes digital EP	EMI
Italy	3 June 2011	Digital EP 1, The Remixes digital EP	EMI
Netherlands	3 June 2011	Digital EP 1, The Remixes digital EP	EMI
Switzerland	3 June 2011	Digital EP 1, The Remixes digital EP	EMI
New Zealand	3 June 2011	Digital EP 1, Digital EP 2, The Remixes digital EP	Warner Music Australia
Australia	3 June 2011	Digital EP 1, Digital EP 2, The Remixes digital EP	Warner Music Australia
United Kingdom	5 June 2011	The Remixes digital EP	Parlophone
Canada	7 June 2011	Digital EP 1, The Remixes digital EP	Astralwerks
Spain	7 June 2011	Digital EP 1, The Remixes digital EP	EMI
United States	7 June 2011	Digital EP 1, The Remixes digital EP	Astralwerks
Australia	7 June 2011	CD single	Warner Music Australia
Italy	10 June 2011	Contemporary hit radio	Warner Music

== See also ==
- List of number-one dance singles of 2011 (U.S.)
