= Better than Today =

2010 single by Kylie Minogue

"Better Than Today"

Single by Kylie Minogue

from the album Aphrodite
- Released: 3 December 2010
- Recorded: 2009
- Studio: Electric Love Studios, London, England
- Genre: Dance-pop
- Length: 3:25
- Label: Parlophone
- Songwriters: Nerina Pallot; Andy Chatterley
- Producers: Andy Chatterley; Nerina Pallot; Stuart Price

Kylie Minogue singles chronology
"Higher" (2010)	"Better Than Today" (2010)	"Put Your Hands Up (If You Feel Love)" (2011)

Music video
- "Better than Today" on YouTube

"Better Than Today" is a song recorded by Australian singer Kylie Minogue for her eleventh studio album, Aphrodite (2010). The track was originally written and produced by Nerina Pallot and Andy Chatterley for Pallot's 2009 extended play, Buckminster Fuller EP. It was re-recorded by Minogue in 2009, and received additional production by Stuart Price. Musically, "Better Than Today" is a dance-pop song that emulates other styles using guitars, synthesizers and drum programming.

"Better Than Today" was released on 3 December 2010 as the album's third single. It was not as successful as Minogue's preceding releases. After debuting on the chart early with album downloads, it peaked on the UK Singles Chart at number 32, making it her lowest placing since "The One" in 2008. The single was released in Australia on 28 February 2011. It debuted on the ARIA Singles Chart at number 55, making it her third single to miss the top-fifty, after "Finer Feelings" in 1992 (number 60) and "Get Outta My Way" in 2010 (number 69). Despite under-performing in the United Kingdom and Australia, it became Minogue's sixth number-one on the US Hot Dance Club Songs chart and her third consecutive number-one single from the album Aphrodite on that chart.

"Better Than Today" received mixed reviews from contemporary music critics. They applauded the uplifting lyrics and compared the track's composition to Minogue's works in the early 1990s on Rhythm of Love and the songs of the Scissor Sisters, but did not believe it was strong as an independent single. An accompanying music video, directed by Minogue and her tour staff, was released on 19 November 2010. The video reflected the fashion and choreography of the performances done during her 2009 North American tour, where she debuted the song. Reception for the video was mainly positive, with most publications noting its similarities to Minogue's previous music videos.

== Background and release ==
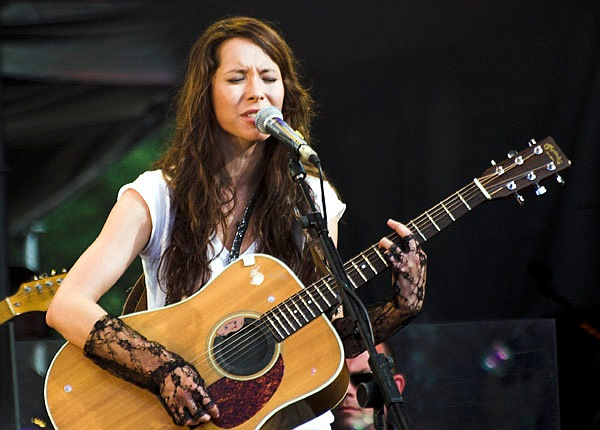
Nerina Pallot (pictured) wrote and produced "Better Than Today" with her husband, Andy Chatterley.

"Better Than Today" was written and produced by married couple Nerina Pallot and Andy Chatterley. The song was originally included on Pallot's project Buckminster Fuller EP in February 2009. After hearing Pallot's work, Minogue's A&R contacted her manager. Pallot stated when Minogue called her later, she "really didn't believe it was her", continuing, "when [Minogue] came to the studio in a nasty part of London I thought: 'OK, she really does want to do this'". Pallot and Chatterley were the first two writers and producers to work with Minogue when recording sessions for Aphrodite began in April 2009. "Better Than Today" was one of the prominent results of the collaboration. Pallot commented on working with Minogue, calling her "accommodating and lovely and approachable and normal [sic]".

Subsequent sessions Minogue had with the duo were not as successful. After Parlophone president Miles Leonard made Stuart Price the executive producer over the album in December 2009, Price and Jake Shears (a friend and former collaboration partner of Price and Minogue) began to re-produce the album. After being retooled by Price, "Better Than Today" was left as one of only two remaining collaborations Minogue had with Pallot and Chatterly, along with the album's title track. Additional production and mixing took place at London in 2009. "Better Than Today" was released as the third single from the album on 3 December 2010. It was released digitally in Minogue's native Australia on 28 February 2011 and physically on 18 March 2011.

== Composition ==
"Better Than Today" is a dance-pop song with influences from other styles, including funk, soul and country. It also incorporates the use of the electric and acoustic guitar, synthesizers and drum programming by both Pallot and Chatterley. According to the sheet music published by Hal Leonard Corporation, it is set in common time with a tempo of 110 beats per minute. Minogue's version is composed in the key of F major with her vocal range spanning from the low-note of A_{4} to the high-note of F_{6}. The chord progression F-E♭-Dm-Dm-E♭-F follows throughout her edition while the middle eight remains in F (Pallot's version did not contain a middle eight).

Many comparisons have been made on the song's style. Popjustice compared "Better Than Today" to the style used in Minogue's 1990 album Rhythm of Love. Hannah Kim of the Korea JoongAng Daily stated the track adds on to a "classic 70s disco sound". When reviewing the album, Ian Wade of BBC Music called the song a "tech-country strut". Fraser McAlpine of BBC said that without research, it "bears the musical fingerprint" of Shears. "It's got that 'Laura' bounce ... And the bit where Kylie goes way up high? Well you've heard the verses to 'I Don't Feel Like Dancin'' right? Sonically similar..." Christel Loar of PopMatters and Nick Levine of Digital Spy praised the lyric in the song, "What's the point in living if you don't wanna dance?" Levine specifically applauded Pallot and Chatterly for "coming up with probably the Kyliest Kylie lyric ever".

== Critical reception ==
The song has received positive reviews in context of the album. Mikael Wood of Entertainment Weekly called "Better Than Today" a standout track on Aphrodite. Wade of BBC Music also gave a favorable review, saying the track "throws up imagery of line-dancing cyborgs". Loar of PopMatters labeled it a "sugary bounce". However in contrast to the positive album reviews, Nick Ward of The Nelson Mail was not impressed. He said that there is no "oomph" that "would have made ['Better Than Today'] complete".

When "Better Than Today" became a single, reviews for the song itself were mixed. McAlpine of BBC said "the relentless swaggering momentum" of the track "gets a little wearing". He continued, "At some point, something ELSE needs to happen, y'see [sic]. No matter how many times Kylie's voice swoops up high and skips back down again, no matter how firmly she pushes herself into those demanding choruses; it begins like Tigger and ends like a route march around an aerobics class." He gave the single three out of five stars. Popjustice, while stating the song is "rather enjoyable", added that it is a "no-harm-intended album track" instead of "the big balls-out I'm-bloody-Kylie comeback single". They remarked at a later date, saying that they were "slightly alarmed" when the song became a single. Nima Baniamer of Contact Music described the song as "a fun electro number", but it "sadly doesn't seem to pack a punch enough to stand firm as a lead-out track". Originally in an album review, Levine of Digital Spy called the tune "as uplifting a dance-pop ditty as we're likely to hear all year". In a single review, Levine re-evaluated the song, stating that it is not "the freshest confection you'll sample this party season" but he continued, calling it "sweet, seductive and pretty much impossible not to succumb to over and over again". He gave the single four out of five stars.

== Chart performance ==
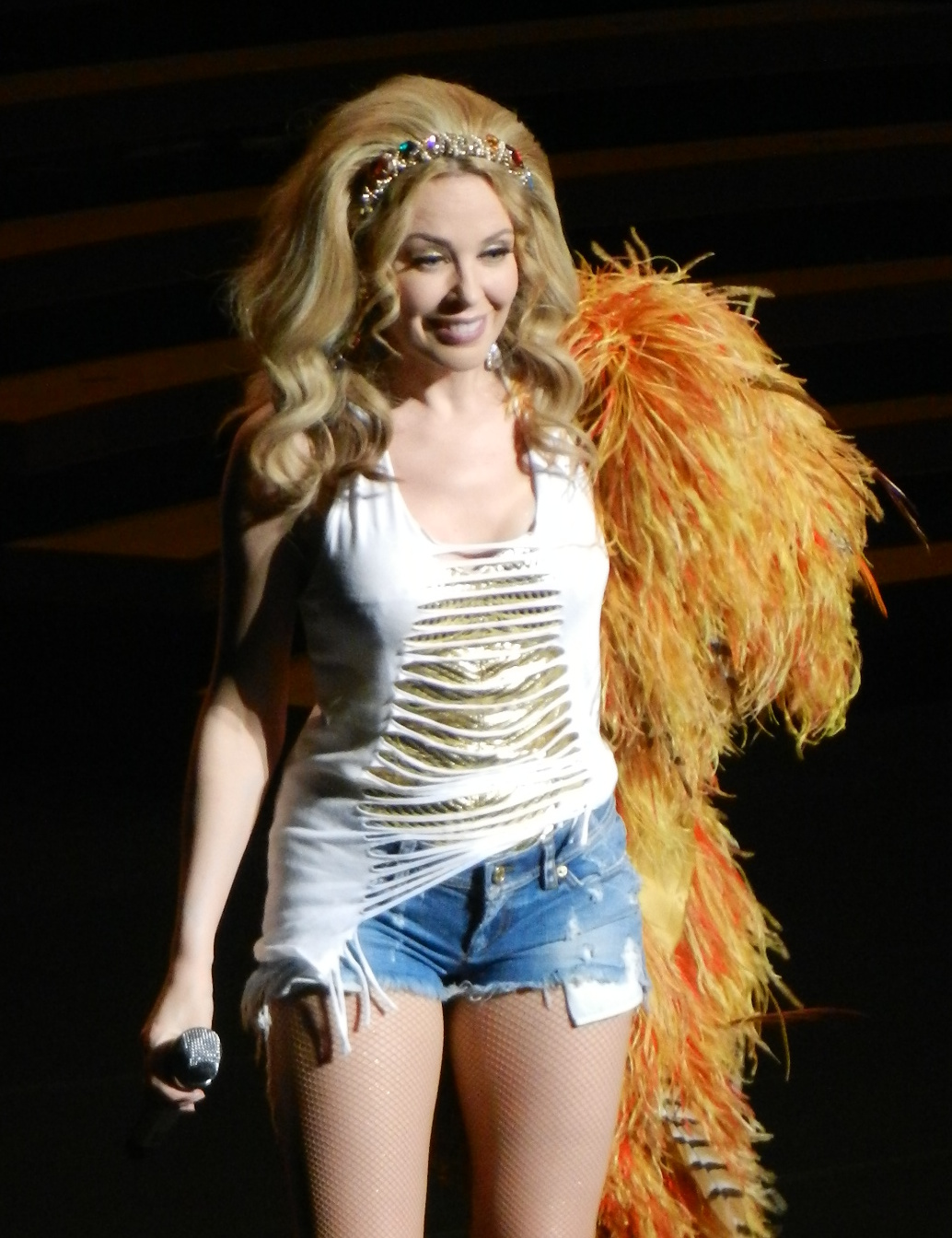
Minogue performing "Better Than Today" during her Aphrodite: Les Folies Tour in 2011. The song became her sixth number-one single on the U.S. Hot Dance Club Songs chart.

During the week of 20 November 2010, "Better Than Today" made its UK Singles Chart debut at number 67. This was based purely on digital sales from the album as the single was not released until 3 December 2010. The day before its release, it reached a new peak of number 40, before dropping to number 63, only to go on to peak at number 32 on 18 December 2010. As a result, "Better Than Today" is one of Minogue's lowest charting singles in the United Kingdom. It proved to be her least successful UK charting since 2008's "The One" which peaked at number 36. The single had similar results in other European countries, peaking at number 27 in Scotland and number 63 in France.

In the United States, "Better Than Today" debuted at number 44 on the Hot Dance Club Songs chart. It rose to number-one on the issue date entitled 5 March 2011, not only becoming Minogue's sixth number-one single on the chart, but also her third consecutive number-one from the Aphrodite album on that chart. At the time, Minogue also held the third spot on the chart with "Higher", her collaboration with British recording artist Taio Cruz, becoming the first artist to claim two of the top three spots at the same time in the American dance chart's history. After its release in Australia, the song made its debut on the ARIA Singles Chart at number 55. This proved to be her third single to miss the top-fifty along with "Finer Feelings" (1992), which peaked at number 60, and "Get Outta My Way" (2010), which peaked at number 69. In a March 2011 interview with PerthNow, Minogue expressed disappointment with the commercial performance of her singles from Aphrodite. Minogue said,

"It's confusing. I felt a little let down with my releases from Aphrodite,... I was caught out like a lot of artists were, with record companies figuring out how to do single releases these days. I remember doing a promo for one of the last singles and it just felt really old-fashioned. I'm pretty computer-savvy, something didn't feel right, but no one said anything to me."

Consequently, after acknowledging that both "Better Than Today" and "Get Outta My Way" charted poorly across the world, she announced there would be no more singles released from the album. However, "Put Your Hands Up" was released in late May 2011 following a press release from Astralwerks, Minogue's North American record label.

== Music video ==
=== Background and synopsis ===
Minogue premiered the video for "Better Than Today" at her official website on 19 November 2010. The video was directed by Minogue herself with help from her tour staff, including her long-time stylist and friend William Baker. The video resembles performances of the song done during her 2009 North American tour, featuring the same dances by choreographer Tony Testa.

The video begins with Minogue dancing on a stage surrounded by laser beams. As the first verse starts, she is surrounded by female dancers wearing pink wigs as shoulder pads and a band wearing Pac-Man helmets. She is wearing a blue bodysuit with fringed material on top and silver, spiked Louboutin stilettos similar to the golden ones featured in the video for "Get Outta My Way". Screens in the background show several colourful projections inspired by Space Invaders and other arcade games. When the chorus starts, Minogue sits on two Marshall amps while animated flowers, 3D bears and bold letters echoing lyrics move through the screens. During the bridge, Minogue is surrounded once again with laser beams, some projected from her microphone stand. The screens display colourful lips inspired by the musical The Rocky Horror Picture Show. After the final chorus cuts through all scenes the video ends with Minogue surrounded by the laser beams again, lowering her beamed microphone stand.

=== Reception ===
Feedback to the music video was mostly positive. Pink is the New Blog applauded the video, labelling it a "very colorful, 80s video game inspired video". Gary Pini of Paper described the set of the music video as being "designed by Murakami and Pac Man" with "a cool microphone stand the shoots out laser beams". Becky Bain of Idolator also enjoyed the "sexified" video, saying "You have to love a super cool chick like Kylie who isn't afraid to let her inner nerd out in the open." Bradley Stern of MuuMuse described it as a mixture of the music videos for "2 Hearts" and "The One". He continued, "...the video for "Better Than Today" kicks Kylie's X Factor performance up ten notches with laser lights, bright neon animations, extra furry pink shoulders–and of course, killer spiked heels." HardCandy was reminded of the music video for "Can't Get You Out of My Head". "I love that she's brought back her 'Can't Get You Out of My Head' robots with an updated Tron feel to them." They added that the video was "nothing special or ground breaking".

== Live performances ==
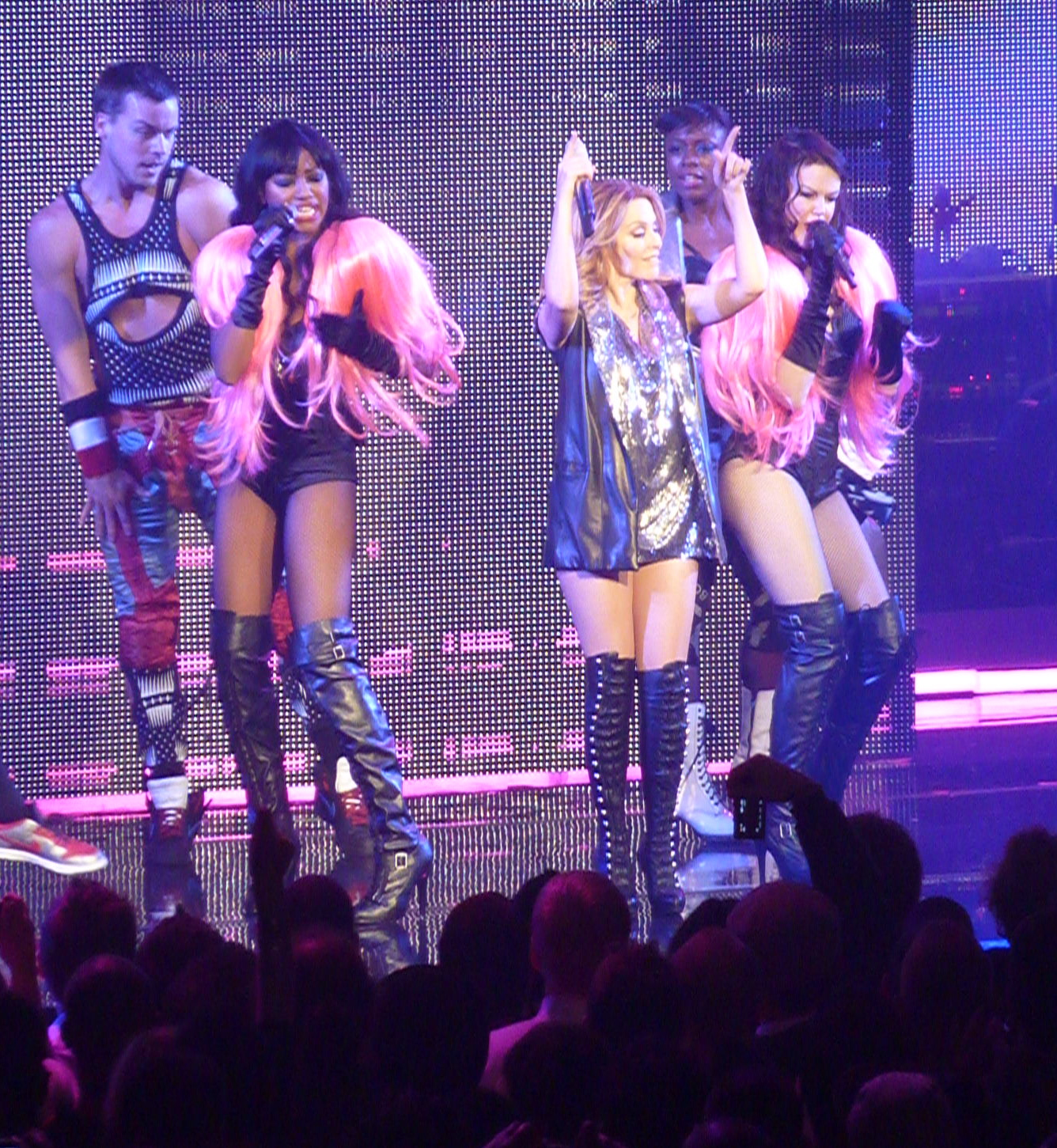
Minogue, flanked by her dancers, performing "Better Than Today" during her 2009 North American tour

Minogue premiered "Better Than Today" by adding it to the set list of her 2009 North American tour. Prior to performing the song on the first tour date in Oakland, she said, "I know it's taken me a little long to get [to the United States], so I thought I'd give you guys a first..." Rolling Stone commented on Minogue's background singers during the song, saying they had "the evening's most striking fashion innovation": neon pink wigs worn as shoulder pads. After the tour stop in Chicago, John Dugan of Time Out said that the performance was his "favorite song of the night". The song was added in the Aphrodite: Les Folies Tour setlist in 2011. Simon Collins of The West Australian praising Minogue's ability to "regather herself to deliver the sassy stomp" of the song.

To promote the single, Minogue took on a number of television performances. On 7 November 2010, she sang the song live on The X Factor's results show. She wore a red, fringed cocktail dress with small cut-outs in the waist and the silver heels featured in the music video. She received a standing ovation from all four judges; Dannii Minogue, who is a judge on the show and Minogue's sister, gave her praise. She called the performance a "ten out of ten". Minogue reprised this performance for BBC One's Children in Need 2010 television special on 19 November 2010. She donned a bodysuit similar to the one featured in the video, but in white. Minogue opened Capital FM's Jingle Bell Ball on 6 December 2010, adding "Better Than Today" to her set list. She wore a sheer, white floor-length gown with the same silver heels. She then went on to perform the song at the annual Royal Variety Performance on 10 December 2010. Minogue and Gary Barlow got the chance to greet Prince Charles and Camilla at the London Palladium, where the event was held. At the end of 2010, she performed a big band version of the song at Jools Holland's annual Hootenanny.

== Formats and track listings ==
European and UK 2-track CD single

1. "Better Than Today" – 3:25
2. "Can't Get You Out of My Head" (BBC Live Lounge Version) – 3:13

European and UK CD maxi-single; Australian CD maxi-single

1. "Better Than Today" – 3:25
2. "Better Than Today" (Bills and Hurr Remix) – 8:36
3. "Better Than Today" (The Japanese Popstars Mix) – 6:45
4. "Get Outta My Way" (BBC Live Lounge Version) – 3:31

European and UK 7-inch picture disc

1. "Better Than Today" – 3:25
2. "Better Than Today" (Bills and Hurr Remix - Radio Edit) – 3:48

International digital EP

1. "Better Than Today" – 3:25
2. "Better Than Today" (Bills and Hurr Remix Edit) – 3:48
3. "Better Than Today" (The Japanese Popstars Mix) – 6:44
4. "Better Than Today" (Monarchy 'Kylie Through the Wormhole' Remix) – 7:26
5. "All the Lovers" (BBC Live Lounge Version) – 3:33

US digital remix EP

1. "Better Than Today" (Bimbo Jones Club Mix) – 7:34
2. "Better Than Today" (Bimbo Jones Radio Edit) – 3:09
3. "Better Than Today" (Bellatrax Remix) – 5:33
4. "Better Than Today" (Bellatrax Remix - Radio Edit) – 3:02

== Credits and personnel ==
Credits adapted from the liner notes of "Better Than Today":

- Nerina Pallot – producer, writer, background vocals, acoustic guitar, electric guitar, piano, keyboards, synthesizer, engineer
- Andy Chatterley – producer, writer, piano, keyboards, synthesizer, drum programming, engineer
- Stuart Price – producer (additional), mixing
- Ben Vella – electric guitar
- Kylie Minogue – background vocals, lead vocals
- Jason Tarver – engineer (assistant)
- Dave Emery – mixing (assistant)

== Charts ==
=== Weekly charts ===
Weekly chart performance for "Better Than Today"
Chart (2010–2011)	Peak position
Australia (ARIA)	55
CIS Airplay (TopHit)	109
France (SNEP)	63
Global Dance Tracks (Billboard)	30
Mexico (Billboard Ingles Airplay)	38
Scottish Singles Sales (Official Charts)	27
UK Singles (Official Charts)	32
US Dance Club Songs (Billboard)	1

=== Year-end chart ===
Year-end chart performance for "Better Than Today"
Chart (2011)	Position
US Hot Dance Club Songs (Billboard)	10

== Release history ==
Release dates and formats for "Better Than Today"
Country	Date	Format	Label	Ref.(s)
Austria	3 December 2010	Digital EP	EMI	
Belgium	3 December 2010	Digital EP	EMI	
Canada	3 December 2010	Digital EP	EMI	
Denmark	3 December 2010	Digital EP	EMI	
Finland	3 December 2010	Digital EP	EMI	
France	3 December 2010	Digital EP	EMI	
Germany	3 December 2010	Digital EP	EMI	
Ireland	3 December 2010	Digital EP	EMI	
Netherlands	3 December 2010	Digital EP	EMI	
Switzerland	3 December 2010	Digital EP	EMI	
United Kingdom	3 December 2010	Digital EP	Parlophone	
United States	3 December 2010	Digital EP	Astralwerks	
Norway	6 December 2010	Digital EP	EMI	
Sweden	6 December 2010	Digital EP	EMI	
United Kingdom	6 December 2010	7" single; CD single	Parlophone	
Italy	7 December 2010	Digital EP	EMI	
Spain	7 December 2010	Digital EP	EMI	
Italy	18 December 2010	Contemporary hit radio	Warner Music	
Australia	28 February 2011	Digital EP	Warner Music Australia	
New Zealand	28 February 2011	Digital EP	Warner Music Australia	
United States	8 March 2011	Remix EP	Astralwerks	
Australia	18 March 2011	CD single	Warner Music Australia	

== See also ==
- List of number-one dance singles of 2011 (U.S.)
