= Aphrodite: Les Folies Tour =

2011 concert tour by Kylie Minogue

- World tour by Kylie Minogue
- Promotional poster for the tour
- Location: Europe; North America; Africa; Oceania; Asia
- Associated album: Aphrodite
- Start date: 19 February 2011
- End date: 14 July 2011
- Legs: 6
- No. of shows: 77
- Box office: $60 million ($85.87 million in 2025 dollars)

Kylie Minogue concert chronology
- North American tour (2009); Aphrodite: Les Folies Tour (2011); Anti Tour (2012)

Aphrodite: Les Folies Tour, also known as Aphrodite Live, was the twelfth concert tour by Australian singer Kylie Minogue. It was launched in support of her eleventh studio album, Aphrodite (2010). The tour was officially announced in September 2010, initially with European venues confirmed. Additional British dates were added in January 2011, alongside North American and Asian dates. Australian dates were confirmed in March 2011, and in May of the same year, Minogue announced she would tour Africa for the first time. The stage of the tour was composed of an Ancient Greek temple wall and two runways leading to a B-stage, which included a three-tiered scissor lift surrounded by water fountains. Thirty water jets created by The Fountain People, a tilted rotating platform and aerial performer displays were also part of the staging, paying homage to Greek mythology and culture. Effects and staging were provided by TAIT Towers, who described the stage as "one of the most technically advanced ever built". Fashion designers Dolce & Gabbana created the costumes for the tour.

Aphrodite: Les Folies Tour was described as a "pop spectacle" and was divided into seven segments. The Birth of Aphrodite featured Minogue emerging from the stage atop of a golden conch shell as a goddess. Pegasus included a large prop Pegasus and displayed the singer being pulled around the B-stage on a chariot. Gladiator began with an instrumental interlude and concluded with Minogue left alone on the stage. Celestial Love featured a giant white bust of the singer, concluding with a jazz-inspired section using a tilted rotating platform. Holograph displayed a series of both electro and rock-inspired numbers, followed by Angel; during which, Minogue flew across onto the B-stage on the back of a dancer. Fanfare featured a carnival-themed performance, and the encore featured the use of the water jets, fountains, scissor lift and aerial performances.

The tour received critical acclaim, with many praising its high-scale production, as well as Minogue's live vocals and stage presence. Aphrodite: Les Folies was also a commercial success, with a total estimated gross of $60 million. This placed the tour 21st on both Billboard's annual "Top 25 Tours" list for 2011, and Pollstar's "Top 50 Worldwide Tours" list. Given the nature of the show, the tour was officially acknowledged by two names; the tour was promoted as the Aphrodite: Les Folies tour in Europe and Australia, and Aphrodite Live elsewhere.

== Background ==
During an interview in June 2010, Minogue was asked if she was going to tour with Aphrodite. She responded, "Oh yeah! [...] Yes, I have show concepts in mind but I can't tell you yet, because it really is in its infancy [...] But come on, with the name Aphrodite as the launch pad, we're going to have a lot to play with! [...] I would like the tour to be like, you're on that sea... and there are the rushes and the dips, and you're just feeling the love. The vibe that I've put out there with 'All the Lovers', and that I'm getting back, is 'feel love, share love'. That's what I want the show to be."

Aphrodite: Les Folies Tour was officially announced via her website on 6 September 2010. By way of introduction, Minogue stated,

"The reaction to 'Aphrodite' has been absolutely incredible and has inspired me and my creative team to develop a new show that will take all of us on a euphoric journey of joy, excitement and glamour. I can't wait to get on the road and see all my fans in 2011."

Minogue later confirmed she would return to the United States to tour. This became the third time the singer has performed stateside since her breakthrough in 2002. She described her previous feat as one of her best decisions in her career. She further commented, "The last couple of years I've really made the effort to visit a lot of places I'd never toured in before and that was so rewarding, fulfilling and inspiring. I'm a glutton for punishment so I want to do it again and I want to take it even further." In January 2011, Minogue expanded the UK leg of her tour from four to fourteen shows. Further dates were added in Japan and the United States. Australian dates were confirmed in March 2011, and in May of the same year, Minogue announced she would tour Africa for the first time.

== Development ==
=== Staging ===
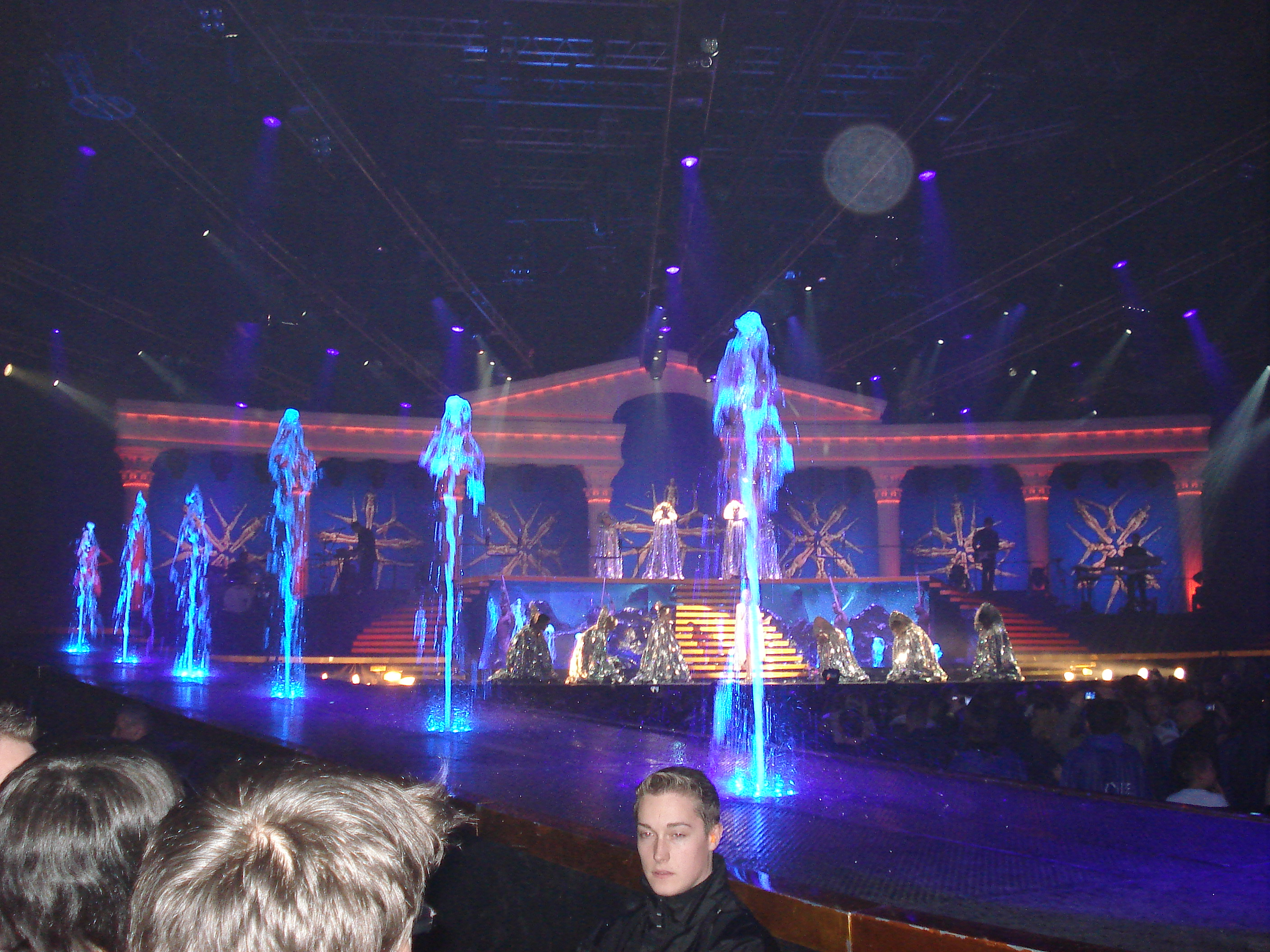
The show paid homage to Greek mythology and culture, with a temple wall and water jets forming its staging.

At the beginning of 2011, Minogue stated that Aphrodite: Les Folies would be her most "extravagant" tour to date. The staging was described by its designers, TAIT Towers, as "one of the most technically advanced ever built". It consisted of a main stage featuring two water pools with ten integrated fountains; both pools were mostly 8 in (0.67 ft) deep, with 36 in (3.0 ft) deep sections to accommodate submersions of the aerialist dancers. A 16 in (1.3 ft)-diameter rotating platform was built into the main stage, which would rake to a 45° angle whilst Minogue and her dancers performed on it. There was also a pool that acted as a B-stage itself, containing a hydraulic three-tier scissor lift at its centre. The two rings were capable of rotating 360°, with the outermost rising 42 in (3.5 ft) above the stage and the innermost rising 109 in (9.1 ft). Featuring 24 fountains, the lift was run by a 15hp hydraulic pump.

The B-stage and the main stage were connected by two runways; each containing six vertical water shooters, two cross-stage water shooters and five arching water jets. The runways featured recycled rubber flooring with drainage holes, where the water drained into sheets of plastic and was emptied into tanks via funnels. Eleven water tanks were situated under the runways and two tanks were situated under the stage. The water was reheated and recirculated through approximately 1π mi (3.1 mi) of hosing. When full with water, the stage weighed 60,000 lb (27 t).

Valued at over $25 million, the show was transported by a crew of in excess of 100 personnel, using a fleet of 25 trucks.

=== Themes ===
Aphrodite: Les Folies Tour paid homage to Greek mythology and culture, with an aerial act inspired by the musical Spider-Man: Turn Off the Dark. While promoting the tour, Minogue stated the main inspiration of the tour's name was inspired by the MGM film, Ziegfeld Follies (1945). She further commented, "Ziegfeld Folies – I've been crazy about that movie and that period in music dance and film. My show has a bit of that so it became 'Aphrodite Les Folies'." The arena shows featured the elaborate water production, which was removed for the smaller venues in order for the singer provide an intimate show. In these cases, the show was promoted as 'Aphrodite Live'.

During rehearsals for the tour, Minogue remarked, "Rehearsals are well underway and the show is shaping up to be more than I could have wished for. All departments are doing a stellar job and the combined level of expertise is nothing short of mind blowing. My friends, Dolce & Gabbana have designed an amazing wardrobe for me. I'm overwhelmed with the love and talent that is going into this tour and I can't wait for my fans to be part of it."

=== Sponsors ===
The Harmonix game Dance Central were announced to be the official sponsors of the European leg of the tour. According to the press release, booths were staged in the lobby areas of the arenas, giving spectators the opportunity to play the game to Minogue's song "Can't Get You Out of My Head". Additionally, a crew were assigned to record both the audience and backstage footage for Minogue's official Facebook page.

== Critical response ==
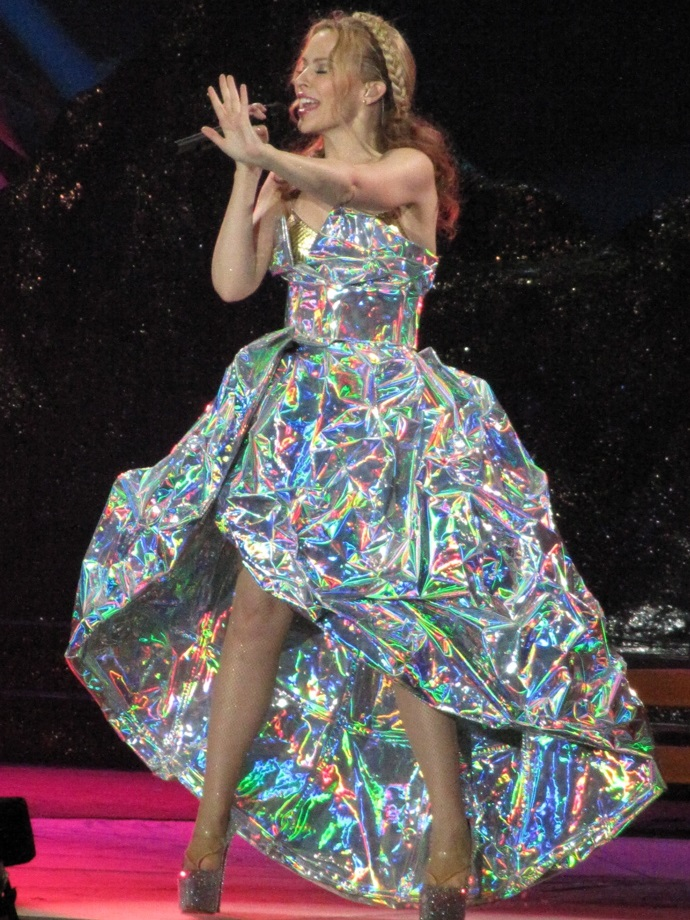
Minogue performing "Can't Get You Out of My Head" wearing a "Bacofoil ball gown"

The tour received acclaim from entertainment critics. Ed Power from The Daily Telegraph gave the concert a four star rating stating that "Kylie Minogue takes retro chic to dizzying extremes on her new tour. Channelling a hitherto unhinted at passion for Ancient Greece and Rome". Power said that "Through a stunning series of set-pieces Kylie proved herself a peerless conjurer of pop spectacle and demonstrated that, when it comes to the classier brand of arena kitsch, she, not Lady Gaga, remains supreme authority."

Elisa Bray from The Independent gave the concert four stars (out of five) and said that "Minogue's authenticity and down-to-earth persona has always made her the most likeable pop diva. From her earliest fame days as Charlene in Australian soap Neighbours, girly though she remains, Kylie has made the successful transition to show-woman." Ian Gittins from The Guardian commented that "there is no denying the scale of the production. From the moment Minogue rises from the stage reclining in a golden conch shell in a tableau based on Botticelli's Birth of Venus, it's evident that understatement is not on the menu tonight." He praised her live vocals, describing Minogue's voice as "oddly endearing" and concluded by saying that "it is unfortunate that mainstream America has never taken Minogue to its heart. On this flamboyant evidence, nobody is more ready for a Las Vegas residency."

James Reed from The Boston Globe gave the Aphrodite Live 2011 concert a favourable review by saying that "all eyes were on Minogue, 42, and she was in regal form as both entertainer and singer." Jason Lipshutz from Billboard gave the concert a positive review saying that "Minogue is still an under-appreciated musical force, and one that should not be missed on an all-too-rare U.S. trek." Santiago Felipe from The Village Voice said that "at the center of it all was Kylie, who was by turns bashful and jokingly chiding and absolutely in command, changing dresses as quickly as some people change their mind, flirting with the audience through performances [...] She might be a bit of a cult popstar in the U.S., but she radiated at maximum wattage throughout the evening".

== Concert synopsis ==
The show was divided into seven segments; The Birth of Aphrodite, Pegasus, Gladiator, Celestial Love, Holograph, Angel, Fanfare, and an encore. It began with an overture dubbed "The Birth of Aphrodite", in an Atlantis-like setting, which incorporated elements of "The Carnival of the Animals". Minogue then emerged from the set atop a golden conch shell to sing "Aphrodite". This was followed by "The One", featuring harps rising from the stage and the dancers treating Minogue as though she were a goddess. The singer then performed "Wow", surrounded by dancers dressed as Roman centurions. The second section, Pegasus, began with an instrumental interlude. Minogue then rose from the stage riding a giant golden Pegasus to perform "Illusion"; the song features a breakdown after the bridge where the singer and the dancers perform a dance routine. Following this, "I Believe in You" was performed, where she was pulled around the catwalk on a chariot by four dancers trussed up in leather straps. Gladiator began with Minogue emerging wearing a black crinoline and top hat to sing "Cupid Boy"; this was followed by "Spinning Around" and "Get Outta My Way". Minogue was then left alone to perform a new remix of "What Do I Have to Do". "Everything Is Beautiful" commenced the fourth section, Celestial Love, during which she emerged in front of a white bust of herself. This was followed by a jazz version of "Slow" using the rotating platform, where the singer was surrounded by female dancers fanning her with large feathers.

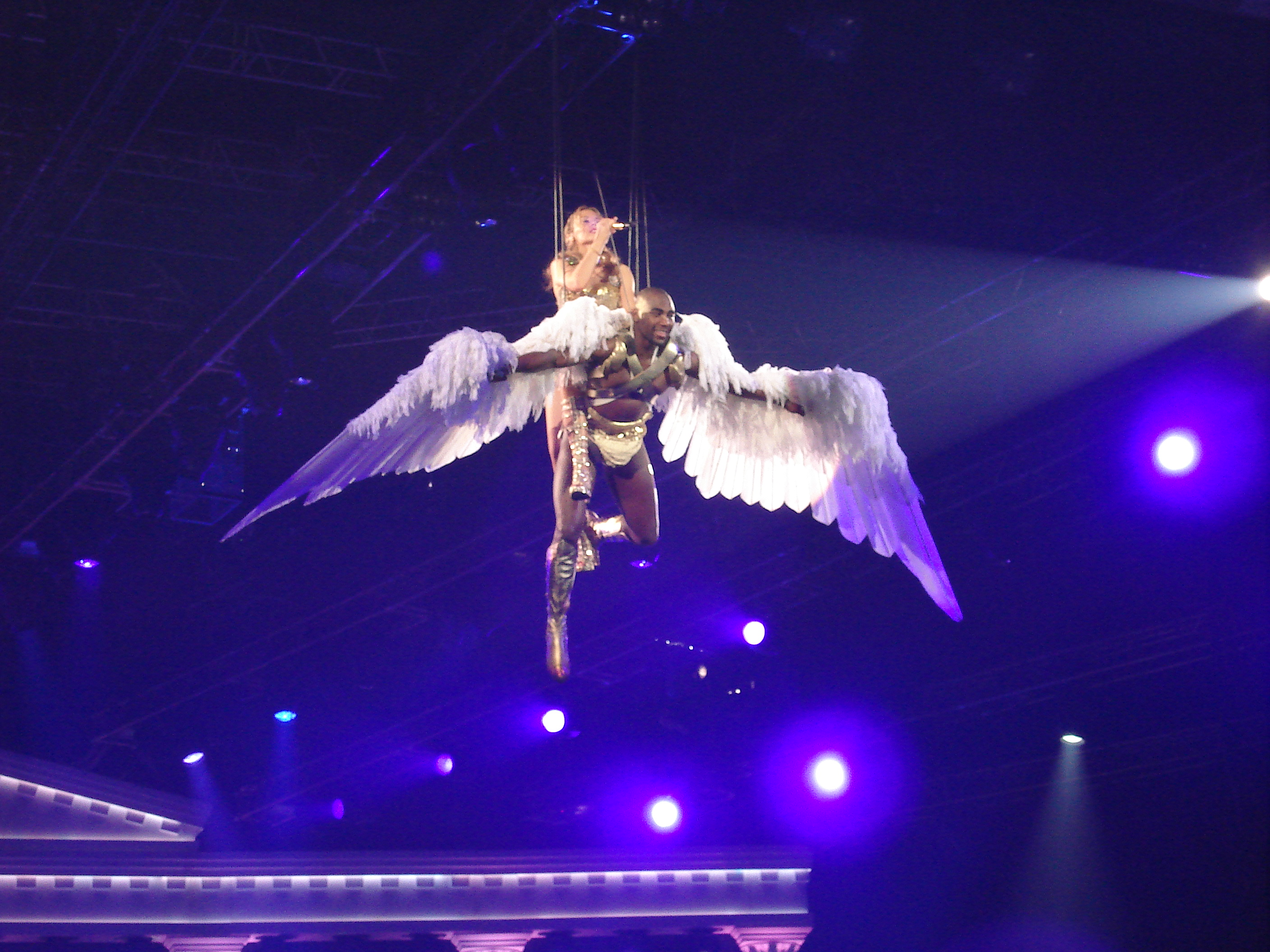
Minogue flying to the B-stage performing "Closer" atop of a dancer

Holograph, the fifth section, began with "Confide in Me". Minogue wore an asymmetric holographic "Bacofoil ball gown". This was followed by a rock-oriented performance of the hit single "Can't Get You Out of My Head". "In My Arms" was performed next and closed the section. The sixth section, Angel, began with "Looking for an Angel". "Closer" was then performed, where Minogue flew to the B-stage atop of a dancer dressed as an angel, which was followed by Minogue covering the Eurythmics song "There Must Be an Angel (Playing with My Heart)". After this, Minogue talked with the audience and introduced the band before performing a mash-up of "Can't Beat the Feeling" and "Love at First Sight", which was followed by a performance of "If You Don't Love Me". Fanfare commenced with "Better the Devil You Know" with Minogue wearing hot pants and an orange jacket. "Better than Today" was performed next, although at some shows it was omitted. Minogue then took requests from the audience and went on to close the main body of the show with "Put Your Hands Up (If You Feel Love)". The encore began with an instrumental intro dubbed "Million Dollar Mermaid", which featured projections of swimmers. This leads into a new remix of "On a Night Like This", which featured water jets. "All the Lovers" closed the show; the water jets, fountains, scissor lift and aerial performances were used.

== Set list ==
This set list represents the 11 April 2011 show in London, England. It does not represent all dates throughout the tour.

Act 1: The Birth of Aphrodite

1. "The Birth of Aphrodite" (Instrumental Introduction) (contains elements of "The Carnival of the Animals")
2. "Aphrodite"
3. "The One"
4. "Wow" (contains "Death Metal Disco Scene Mix")

Act 2: Pegasus

5. "Illusion"
6. "I Believe in You"

Act 3: Gladiator

7. "Cupid Boy"
8. "Spinning Around"
9. "Get Outta My Way"
10. "What Do I Have to Do" (contains elements of "The End" by The Beatles)

Act 4: Celestial Love

11. "Everything Is Beautiful"
12. "Slow" (contains "Chemical Brothers Mix" outro)

Act 5: Holograph

13. "Confide in Me" (contains "Big Brothers Mix" introduction and samples from "Wonderful Life" by Hurts)
14. "Can't Get You Out of My Head" (contains segments from "Uprising" by Muse)
15. "In My Arms"

Act 6: Angel

16. "Looking for an Angel"
17. "Closer"
18. "There Must Be an Angel (Playing with My Heart)" (Eurythmics cover)
19. "Love at First Sight" / "Can't Beat the Feeling"
20. "If You Don't Love Me"

Act 7: Fanfare

21. "Better the Devil You Know" (contains elements of "Fanfarra (Despedida)" by Sérgio Mendes)
22. "Better than Today"
23. "Put Your Hands Up (If You Feel Love)"

Encore

24. "Million Dollar Mermaid" (Instrumental Interlude)
25. "On a Night Like This" (contains elements of Sammy and Yanou's version of "Heaven")
26. "All the Lovers"

Notes

- "Closer" was only performed at European and Australian dates.
- "Better than Today" was performed at select dates from 14 March 2011.
- "2 Hearts" and "I Should Be So Lucky" were exclusively performed during the Japanese concerts.

== Tour dates ==
List of 2011 concerts
Date (2011)	City	Country	Venue	Opening acts	Attendance	Revenue
19 February	Herning	Denmark	Jyske Bank Boxen	—N/a	—N/a	—N/a
22 February	Helsinki	Finland	Hartwall Areena	—N/a	—N/a	—N/a
23 February	Tallinn	Estonia	Saku Suurhall	—N/a	—N/a	—N/a
25 February	Riga	Latvia	Arēna Rīga	—N/a	—N/a	—N/a
26 February	Vilnius	Lithuania	Siemens Arena	—N/a	—N/a	—N/a
28 February	Hamburg	Germany	O_{2} Hamburg	Frida Gold	6,786 / 10,249	$448,384
1 March	Berlin	Germany	O_{2} World	Frida Gold	7,771 / 12,204	$571,139
2 March	Prague	Czech Republic	O_{2} Arena	—N/a	—N/a	—N/a
4 March	Leipzig	Germany	Arena Leipzig	Frida Gold	—N/a	—N/a
5 March	Munich	Germany	Olympiahalle	Frida Gold	—N/a	—N/a
6 March	Mannheim	Germany	SAP Arena	Frida Gold	—N/a	—N/a
8 March	Milan	Italy	Mediolanum Forum	—N/a	—N/a	—N/a
9 March	Zürich	Switzerland	Hallenstadion	—N/a	—N/a	—N/a
11 March	Toulouse	France	Zénith de Toulouse	—N/a	—N/a	—N/a
12 March	Barcelona	Spain	Palau Sant Jordi	Matinée	—N/a	—N/a
14 March (Note: The 14 March 2011 show in Amnéville, France at the Galaxie Amnéville was originally due to take place in Nantes at the Zénith de Nantes Métropole.)	Amnéville	France	Galaxie Amnéville	—N/a	—N/a	—N/a
15 March	Paris	France	Palais Omnisports de Paris-Bercy	—N/a	—N/a	—N/a
17 March (Note: The 17 March 2011 show in Amsterdam, Netherlands at the Heineken Music Hall was originally due to take place at the GelreDome XS.)	Amsterdam	Netherlands	Heineken Music Hall	—N/a	—N/a	—N/a
18 March	Oberhausen	Germany	König Pilsener Arena	Frida Gold	—N/a	—N/a
19 March	Antwerp	Belgium	Sportpaleis	—N/a	12,153 / 14,511	$756,761
22 March	Dublin	Ireland	The O_{2}	The Ultra Girls	—N/a	—N/a
23 March	Dublin	Ireland	The O_{2}	The Ultra Girls	—N/a	—N/a
25 March	Cardiff	Wales	Motorpoint Arena	The Ultra Girls	8,420 / 8,800	$771,549
26 March	Cardiff	Wales	Motorpoint Arena	The Ultra Girls	8,420 / 8,800	$771,549
28 March	Glasgow	Scotland	SECC Concert Hall 4	The Ultra Girls	18,500 / 20,250	$1,882,260
29 March	Glasgow	Scotland	SECC Concert Hall 4	The Ultra Girls	18,500 / 20,250	$1,882,260
30 Mar	Glasgow	Scotland	SECC Concert Hall 4	The Ultra Girls	18,500 / 20,250	$1,882,260
1 April	Manchester	England	Manchester Evening News Arena	The Ultra Girls	44,578 / 45,000	$4,449,280
2 April	Manchester	England	Manchester Evening News Arena	The Ultra Girls	44,578 / 45,000	$4,449,280
4 April	Manchester	England	Manchester Evening News Arena	The Ultra Girls	44,578 / 45,000	$4,449,280
5 April	Manchester	England	Manchester Evening News Arena	The Ultra Girls	44,578 / 45,000	$4,449,280
7 April	London	England	The O_{2} Arena	The Ultra Girls	70,100 / 70,500	$6,754,860
8 April	London	England	The O_{2} Arena	The Ultra Girls	70,100 / 70,500	$6,754,860
9 April	London	England	The O_{2} Arena	The Ultra Girls	70,100 / 70,500	$6,754,860
11 April	London	England	The O_{2} Arena	The Ultra Girls	70,100 / 70,500	$6,754,860
12 April	London	England	The O_{2} Arena	The Ultra Girls	70,100 / 70,500	$6,754,860
23 April	Chiba	Japan	Makuhari Event Hall	Verbal; Anoraak; Mademoiselle Yulia	—N/a	—N/a
24 April	Chiba	Japan	Makuhari Event Hall	Verbal; Anoraak; Mademoiselle Yulia	—N/a	—N/a
25 April	Osaka	Japan	Osaka-jō Hall	—N/a	—N/a	—N/a
28 April	Montreal	Canada	Bell Centre	DJ Stéphan Grondin	4,891 / 6,114	$456,262
29 April	Boston	United States	Agganis Arena	Richie LaDue	2,694 / 3,749	$253,987
30 April	Fairfax	United States	Patriot Center	—N/a	3,246 / 4,821	$307,722
2 May	New York City	United States	Hammerstein Ballroom	DJ Randy Bettis	7,451 / 9,120	$721,161
3 May	New York City	United States	Hammerstein Ballroom	DJ DeMarko!	7,451 / 9,120	$721,161
4 May	New York City	United States	Hammerstein Ballroom	DJ Tracy Young	7,451 / 9,120	$721,161
6 May	Atlanta	United States	Fox Theatre	—N/a	2,838 / 4,515	$248,686
7 May	Sunrise	United States	BankAtlantic Center	—N/a	4,000 / 4,441	$253,756
8 May	Orlando	United States	Hard Rock Live	DJ Scott Robert	2,011 / 2,723	$155,555
10 May	Houston	United States	Verizon Wireless Theater	—N/a	1,831 / 3,202	$156,915
12 May	Mexico City	Mexico	Palacio de los Deportes	—N/a	—N/a	—N/a
14 May	Guadalajara	Mexico	Auditorio Telmex	—N/a	—N/a	—N/a
16 May	Monterrey	Mexico	Arena Monterrey	—N/a	—N/a	—N/a
18 May	Grand Prairie	United States	Verizon Theatre	Erik Thoresen	2,239 / 2,989	$218,105
20 May	Los Angeles	United States	Hollywood Bowl	Kaskade	9,052 / 9,986	$809,146
21 May	San Francisco	United States	Bill Graham Civic Auditorium	—N/a	5,670 / 6,074	$482,455
22 May	Las Vegas	United States	The Colosseum at Caesars Palace	DJ Morningstar	4,062 / 4,062	$445,612
3 June	Brisbane	Australia	Brisbane Entertainment Centre	Gypsy & The Cat	15,540 / 22,686	$2,442,780
4 June	Brisbane	Australia	Brisbane Entertainment Centre	Gypsy & The Cat	15,540 / 22,686	$2,442,780
7 June	Sydney	Australia	Sydney Entertainment Centre	Gypsy & The Cat	26,689 / 30,000	$3,730,000
8 June	Sydney	Australia	Sydney Entertainment Centre	Gypsy & The Cat	26,689 / 30,000	$3,730,000
11 June	Sydney	Australia	Sydney Entertainment Centre	Gypsy & The Cat	26,689 / 30,000	$3,730,000
14 June	Melbourne	Australia	Rod Laver Arena	Gypsy & The Cat	25,598 / 27,600	$3,510,740
15 June	Melbourne	Australia	Rod Laver Arena	Gypsy & The Cat	25,598 / 27,600	$3,510,740
16 June	Melbourne	Australia	Rod Laver Arena	Gypsy & The Cat	25,598 / 27,600	$3,510,740
18 June	Adelaide	Australia	Adelaide Entertainment Centre	Gypsy & The Cat	8,537 / 8,537	$1,124,185
22 June	Perth	Australia	Burswood Dome	Gypsy & The Cat	12,626 / 15,000	$1,608,139
25 June	Bangkok	Thailand	IMPACT Arena	—N/a	—N/a	—N/a
27 June	Bogor	Indonesia	SICC Auditorium	—N/a	—N/a	—N/a
29 June	Singapore		Singapore Indoor Stadium	—N/a	—N/a	—N/a
1 July	Hong Kong		HKCEC Hall 5BC	—N/a	—N/a	—N/a
3 July	Taipei	Taiwan	TWTC Nangang Exhibition Hall	—N/a	—N/a	—N/a
5 July	Quezon City	Philippines	Araneta Coliseum	—N/a	—N/a	—N/a
8 July	North West	South Africa	Sun City Super Bowl	—N/a	—N/a	—N/a
9 July	North West	South Africa	Sun City Super Bowl	—N/a	—N/a	—N/a
10 July	North West	South Africa	Sun City Super Bowl	—N/a	—N/a	—N/a
13 July	Cape Town	South Africa	GrandWest Casino	—N/a	—N/a	—N/a
14 July	Cape Town	South Africa	GrandWest Casino	—N/a	—N/a	—N/a
