= Aphrodite (Kylie Minogue album) =

2010 album by Kylie Minogue

Studio album by Kylie Minogue
- Released: 30 June 2010
- Recorded: 2009–2010
- Studios: Electric Love (London); EMI (London); Metropolis (London); Central Command (North Hollywood, California); Downtown Studio B (New York City)
- Genres: Dance-pop; disco-pop
- Length: 43:20
- Label: Parlophone
- Producers: Andy Chatterley; Cutfather; Daniel Davidsen; Jim Eliot; Børge Fjordheim; Pascal Gabriel; Calvin Harris; Sebastian Ingrosso; Magnus; Nerina Pallot; Stuart Price; Lucas Secon; Damon Sharpe; Fraser T. Smith; Starsmith; Peter Wallevik; Xenomania

Kylie Minogue chronology
Kylie Live in New York (2009)	Aphrodite (2010)	Pink Sparkle (2010)

Singles from Aphrodite
- 1. "All the Lovers" Released: 11 June 2010; 2. "Get Outta My Way" Released: 27 September 2010; 3. "Better than Today" Released: 3 December 2010; 4. "Put Your Hands Up (If You Feel Love)" Released: 29 May 2011

Aphrodite is the eleventh studio album by Australian singer Kylie Minogue. It was released on 30 June 2010 by Parlophone. In 2009, Minogue began working with British electronic music producer Stuart Price, who served as the executive producer of the album. The two collaborated with various producers and writers on the album, including Jake Shears, Calvin Harris, Sebastian Ingrosso and Pascal Gabriel. Aphrodite follows a musical approach similar to Minogue's previous albums and is primarily a dance-pop and disco-pop record. It draws influences from various dance-based genres including electropop, club and rave music.

Aphrodite received generally positive reviews from music critics, many of whom complimented it as a return to form for Minogue, however, some critics were divided on its production. In Australia, Aphrodite peaked at number two on the Australian Albums Chart and was certified platinum by the Australian Recording Industry Association (ARIA). In the United Kingdom, the album debuted at number one on the UK Albums Chart, earning Minogue the Guinness World Record for achieving the most consecutive decades with top five albums in the country. Additionally, it reached the top five in Belgium, Canada, France, Greece, Spain, and, Switzerland, among others.

Four singles were released from Aphrodite. The lead single, "All the Lovers", peaked at number three in the United Kingdom and reached the top 10 in Belgium, France, Germany, Italy and Spain. Subsequent singles "Get Outta My Way", "Better than Today", and "Put Your Hands Up (If You Feel Love)" generally underperformed on the charts, causing Minogue to express disappointment in her label. In the United States, all four singles released from the album peaked atop the Billboard Hot Dance Club Songs chart. To further promote the album, Minogue embarked on the Aphrodite: Les Folies Tour in 2011.

== Background and production ==
Following her recovery from breast cancer, Minogue released her tenth studio album, X, in 2007. Slated to be released as Minogue's comeback album, X was certified platinum in Australia after it debuted at number one on the Australian Albums Chart. In the United Kingdom, the album peaked at number four on the UK Albums Chart and was eventually certified platinum. Critical reception towards X was generally favourable, although many critics felt that it lacked introspection from Minogue's side due to its lack of consistency and high number of "filler" tracks. In retrospect, critics argued that the album did not serve as a worthy comeback for Minogue.

The initial recording sessions for Aphrodite began in April 2009 when Minogue met with British singer-songwriter Nerina Pallot, with whom she wrote the track "Better than Today". Its live instrumentation, along with the fact that X had been burdened by contributions from too many producers, prompted Minogue's record label Parlophone to decide on a more natural and less convoluted production style for Aphrodite. Later sessions with Pallot proved to be less successful, as her suggested songs were "rapidly supplemented with tracks from a wide range" of contributors. Minogue felt her sessions with Pallot did not yield any dance-pop tracks; fearing that she was "going down the same road, doing the rounds of all the pop dynamos but lacking any cohesive quality," she approached her close friend Jake Shears, male lead singer of American pop group Scissor Sisters, for advice.

"I think it was important for us to make a record that sounded like it was a moment in time, that came from the same place, from the same voice, from the same heart. This was the time capsule. Having it all in one spot just gave it the cohesive sound that we wanted from the start."

— Stuart Price, on serving as the executive producer of Aphrodite

Shears encouraged her to work with Stuart Price, a Grammy Award-winning British electronic music producer who had collaborated with Scissor Sisters on their third studio album Night Work (2010). Miles Leonard, chairman of Parlophone, enlisted Price as the executive producer of the album. He had previously served as the executive producer of American recording artist Madonna's tenth studio album Confessions on a Dance Floor (2005), and international news agency Reuters regarded him as "one of the most in-demand pop producers". In an interview with Popjustice, Price revealed that he got involved in the production of Aphrodite after he met Minogue for a writing session in October 2009. As executive producer, Price was responsible for "shaping the album's sound", deciding its track listing, and mixing the songs in order to ensure that they "feel like they're part of the same album." Popjustice commented that every song on the album has "gone through a bit of a Stuart Price filter so that it doesn't sound like some dickhead [sic] A&R has just aimlessly scooped a load of tracks off a shelf."

Aphrodite marked the first time Minogue enlisted an executive producer; discussing the process, she said "It was just the best experience, and funnily enough I think it's the most cohesive album I've had since the beginning of my career, back in the PWL days, whereby its very nature made it cohesive. There's a lot to be said for working with different producers and trying different stuff which has worked really well for me in the past but I definitely wanted someone to tie this together as Stuart has done so beautifully [...] so that it existed as a real body of work." Minogue and Price subjected songs on Aphrodite to a "Parton Test", as they "knew a song would work if it made sense when sung in the style of Dolly Parton." Shears also contributed to the album, while two of Pallot's collaborations with Minogue were kept. Additional collaborators on the album include Scottish disc jockey Calvin Harris, Swedish disc jockey Sebastian Ingrosso and Belgian musician Pascal Gabriel.

== Composition ==
Billed by her record label Parlophone as her comeback album, Aphrodite is a celebration of Minogue's "dance-floor roots", and is primarily a dance-pop and disco-pop album. Its title alludes to the Greek goddess of love, beauty, pleasure, and procreation. "All the Lovers", one of the last tracks to be recorded for the album, is a "squiggly" electro-disco song written by Jim Eliot and Mima Stilwell, who had previously collaborated with Minogue on "2 Hearts", the lead single from X. It is similar to Minogue's 2004 single "I Believe in You", but has a "more danceable edge", and features a "gauzy, heartbeat rhythm" and "'80s-era synth lines". The song was met with critical acclaim from music critics and was frequently commended for its production and chorus. The second track "Get Outta My Way" was described as a "flamboyant explosion of pop, synth and dance" that "[s]tick[s] faithfully to [Minogue's] roots in bubblegum pop". The song focuses on a "frustrated and furious" Minogue delivering "wispy" vocals in a form of a warning to her uncaring partner, indicating that she may leave him and start "grinding away with another chap". Its lyrical content is suggestive in nature. The song received generally favourable reviews from music critics and was complimented for its musical composition and subject matter. "Put Your Hands Up (If You Feel Love)" is a "club anthem". Receiving mixed critical reviews, its lyrics were criticised for being clichéd, although one critic named it a "concert hit waiting to happen." "Closer" takes a darker and more atmospheric approach, featuring "sighing background vocals and spiralling harpsichord-esque synths." Critics felt that it was one of the more interesting and experimental songs of the album.

"All the Lovers"
A 19-second sample of "All the Lovers", containing part of the chorus, which critics described as "lovely arms-in-the-air" and "anthemic".

Although Price said that no ballads were included in the album, critics opined that the downtempo pop song "Everything Is Beautiful" was penned like one. "Aphrodite", the title track of the album, features a "foot-stomping" beat and "military drummed" instrumentation, similar to that of a marching band. Price likened the song to Janet Jackson for its "'Rhythm Nation'-esque qualities." The song, one of Minogue's two collaborations with Pallot that were kept on the track list, is penned like a dance anthem through which Minogue "brags" about her sexual prowess. It was met with critical acclaim by most music critics, and was declared to be one of the strongest tracks on the album. Minogue wrote the melancholic seventh track "Illusion" with Price. "Better than Today", the first track to be recorded for the album and the second collaboration with Pallot, is a dance-pop song with influences of country music. It was complimented as likeable and a stand-out, but criticised for its monotony.

Written by Minogue, Jake Shears and Calvin Harris, "Too Much" was described as a "rave monster" and is built on a "fugue of synths and disco-rific sampled strings". Critics were divided on the track, with its energy being praised but Harris' production being disapproved of. "Cupid Boy" drew comparisons to the music of English alternative dance band New Order and features Minogue delivering "lusty" vocals over a "retro, throbbing bass line". Its intro, New Order-influenced bass line, and rock guitar instrumentation positively surprised critics. "Looking for an Angel", one of the first songs Minogue and Price wrote together, is composed of "celestial synth strings" and contains an extended breakdown. Price's production of the song received mixed opinions from critic. The set closes with the electropop track "Can't Beat the Feeling", which is similar to the work of French electronic music duo Daft Punk. Its energetic composition and placement as the closing track was appreciated by critics.

The Japanese and digital editions of the album feature Xenomania-produced bonus tracks "Heartstrings" and "Mighty Rivers", respectively. The former was described as a "jaunty, electro-guitar track that feels like it could've been a Light Years B-side", while the latter was said to have a "similar vibe to 'Heartstrings' but ... more impact."

== Release and promotion ==
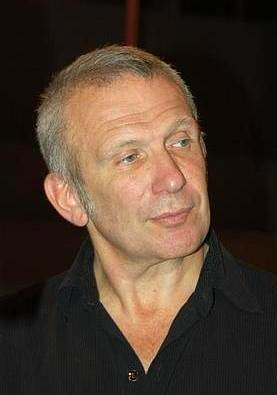
The blue gown Minogue wears on the cover of the album was designed by French haute couture fashion designer and friend Jean Paul Gaultier (pictured).

Aphrodite was released in Australia on 2 July 2010 in digital download, standard CD, and LP formats. In the United Kingdom, it was released on 5 July 2010. A special Experience Edition CD, which contains a 28-page booklet, unseen footage from Minogue's 2009 For You, for Me tour, behind-the-scenes footage of the promotional photo, video shoots of the album and an exclusive online interview was also released on the same day. The artwork of the album captures Minogue "transformed into a goddess" as she is dressed in a dark blue, metal-adorned, silk muslin gown, taken from French fashion designer Jean Paul Gaultier's spring-summer 2010 haute couture collection. Gaultier had previously designed the costumes for Minogue's KylieX2008 and For You, for Me tours.

A three-disc edition of Aphrodite, subtitled the Les Folies Tour Edition, was released on 3 June 2011. In addition to the standard version of the album, the Tour Edition contains a second disc with remixes of the original songs by producers such as Pete Hammond, Denzal Park, Muscles and Bimbo Jones, as well as a third disc featuring a 20-minute party mix. On 11 November 2011, The Goddess Edition of Aphrodite was released exclusively in Australia, containing the standard album and a hardback book featuring pop-up sculptures, costume sketches and never-before-seen photographs; it is limited to 1,000 copies.

On 6 July, Minogue celebrated the worldwide release of the album with a performance held at the Pacha Club in Ibiza, Spain. It was released in the United States on the same day. To promote Aphrodite, Minogue embarked on the Aphrodite: Les Folies Tour, beginning in early 2011. The tour was staged by the creative team behind Disneyland Resort's World of Color show, and the budget of the tour was reported to be around $25 million. Concert shows were held at Europe, North America, Asia, Australia and Africa. Minogue's costumes and wardrobe was designed by her frequent collaborators Domenico Dolce and Stefano Gabbana, owners of the Italian luxury industry fashion house Dolce and Gabbana. The concert shows were spectacles "loosely based around Greek mythology". The entire track listing of the album, excluding only the song "Too Much", was included in the setlist of the tour; other songs were taken from Minogue's previous studio albums, such as Light Years (2000) and Fever (2001). The tour was a commercial success, and ranked at number 21 on Pollstar's year-end "Top 25 Worldwide Tours" list, with a total gross of $52.8 million and ticket sales of 527,683 units. A live album of the concert show, held at the O2 Arena in London, was released as Aphrodite Les Folies: Live in London on 28 November 2011.

=== Singles ===
Four singles were released to promote Aphrodite. "All the Lovers" was released as its lead single in June 2010. Explaining her decision to release it as the lead single, Minogue said: "['All the Lovers'] sums up the euphoria of the album perfectly. It gives me goose-bumps, so I'm really excited to hear what everyone thinks of it". Commercially, "All the Lovers" performed well, particularly in Europe. It peaked at number three on the UK Singles Chart, while also reached the top 10 in France, Italy, Scotland, and Spain. In Australia, "All the Lovers" missed peaking inside the top 10 by reaching number 13 on the singles chart. In the United States, the song peaked at number one on the Billboard Hot Dance Club Songs chart. An accompanying music video for the song was directed by Joseph Kahn and features Minogue singing the song, dressed in a white cobweb-style T-shirt worn over a black bra and knickers, while standing atop a mountain of lingerie-clad couples caressing each other.

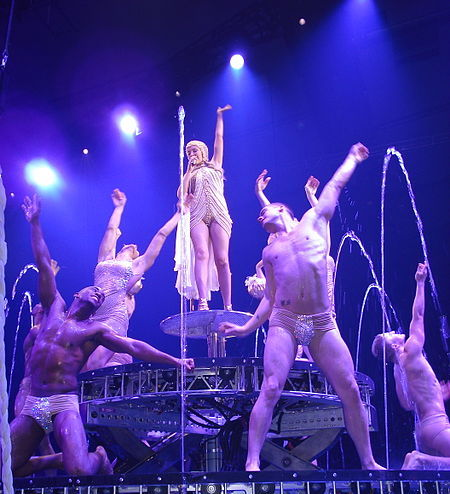
Minogue performing "All the Lovers" during the Aphrodite: Les Folies Tour

"Get Outta My Way" was released as the album's second single on 27 September 2010. It reached number 12 on the UK Singles Chart and number 69 on the Australian Singles Chart. In the United States, the song peaked at number one on the Billboard Hot Dance Club Songs chart. The accompanying music video, directed by AlexandLiane, features Minogue, and a number of male models, performing various dance routines wearing a gold chain mini dress, a red silk mini trench and an LBD. "Better than Today" was released as the third single from the album, on 3 December 2010. The single peaked at number 55 on the Australian chart, thus becoming the second single release from Aphrodite to miss charting inside the top 50, while peaking at number 32 on the UK Singles Chart. In the United States, the song became the third consecutive single from the album to top the Billboard Hot Dance Club Songs chart. An old school arcade game-inspired music video was made for the song. Following the poor chart performance of "Get Outta My Way" and "Better than Today", Minogue expressed disappointment in her record label Parlophone, saying:

"It's confusing. I felt a little let down with my releases from Aphrodite. I was caught out like a lot of artists were, with record companies figuring out how to do single releases these days. I remember doing a promo for one of the last singles and it just felt really old-fashioned. I'm pretty computer-savvy, something didn't feel right, but no one said anything to me. You get Britney releasing 'Hold It Against Me' and Gaga's 'Born This Way' available on iTunes the day you hear it first. That's how it should be. And there's me waiting for a mid-week chart figure like it's 1989."

Although Minogue mentioned that "Better than Today" would be the last single to be released from Aphrodite, "Put Your Hands Up (If You Feel Love)" was released as the fourth and final single from the album, on 29 May 2011. The single managed to reach the top 50 in Australia, peaking at number 50 on the singles chart. It peaked at number one on the Billboard Hot Dance Club Songs chart, thus becoming the fourth single from Aphrodite to peak atop the chart. No official music video for the single was commissioned, although a lyric video for a remixed version of the song by Pete Hammond was released.

== Critical reception ==
Professional ratings
Aggregate scores
Source	Rating
AnyDecentMusic?	6.9/10
Metacritic	67/100
Review scores
Source	Rating
AllMusic	4/5 stars
Consequence of Sound	B
The Daily Telegraph	4/5 stars
Entertainment Weekly	A−
Los Angeles Times	2.5/4 stars
musicOMH	3.5/5 stars
PopMatters	7/10
Rolling Stone	3/5 stars
Slant Magazine	2.5/5 stars
Spin	8/10

Aphrodite received generally positive reviews from music critics. At Metacritic, which assigns a normalized rating out of 100 to reviews from mainstream critics, the album received an average score of 67 based on 21 reviews, indicating "generally favourable reviews". Ben Norman from About.com appreciated Price's production, noting Aphrodite to be more consistent than X. Tim Sendra from AllMusic commended Minogue's choice of collaborators and producers, commenting that the album is the "work of someone who knows exactly what her skills are and who to hire to help showcase them to perfection". He also appreciated the album's cohesion and commercial prospect, and named it "one of her best". The Billboard review of the album complimented Price's "ability to create consistent sound without sacrificing each track's individuality", and termed Aphrodite a "journey cohesive, fun and fitting for a goddess".

Ian Wade from BBC Music gave the album a positive review and found it to be an "astonishing return to form" for Minogue. Nick Levine from Digital Spy felt that it was her best album since Fever and stated that while Aphrodite isn't "deep", it "sure ain't dumb either", opining that it is meant to be heard for relaxation and enjoyment. Mikael Wood of Entertainment Weekly praised the tracks' danceability and concluded that "The diminutive Australian diva is still delivering disco thunder from Down Under." Priya Elan from NME felt that Price was the "perfect choice of musical partner" and complimented him for producing Minogue's "most unified work in ages." Neil McCormick from The Daily Telegraph also complimented Price and termed Aphrodite a "mainstream pop blast." Barry Walters from Spin commended Minogue for returning to her original style of music rather than chasing the "hip-hop or Americanized AOR" sounds. Rob Sheffield from Rolling Stone labelled the album Minogue's "finest work since 1997's underrated Impossible Princess".

However, many critics were displeased with Minogue's lack of innovation on Aphrodite. Jon Parales from The New York Times found the album too similar to the work of Madonna, especially her studio albums Like a Virgin (1984) and Ray of Light (1998). Kitty Empire from The Observer enjoyed the album and complimented Price for "lending a sleek cohesion to the whole (album)", but opined that Aphrodite "lacks the depth and chutzpah of some of her rivals' efforts". James Reed from The Boston Globe gave the album a negative review and criticized it for being too dated, calling it Minogue's "least interesting work she's made in a decade". Caroline Sullivan from The Guardian acknowledged the album's "sharp production", but commented that the album is "only as good as Kylie herself" and criticized it for being uninteresting. Sophia Money-Coutts from The National felt the album lacked new and diverse material from Minogue's previous efforts, while Margaret Wappler from the Los Angeles Times commented on the album's dependency on "old reliable" music and concluded "Our midnight bird (Minogue) has been in the club for a long time, however, and it shows."

== Accolades ==
In 2010, Aphrodite was nominated for Best Pop Release at the ARIA Music Awards, but lost to Sia's We Are Born; Minogue was nominated for Best Female Artist, but lost to Megan Washington. AllMusic included Aphrodite on their list of "Favorite Pop Albums of 2010". Idolator included the album on their list of "10 Out of '10: Idolator's Favorite Albums of the Year" list, with critic Robbie Daw writing that "hooking up with producer Stuart Price turned out to be the perfect way for Kylie to give her already impressive career a fresh jolt" and that "Aphrodite pretty much was my Summer 2010". At the 2011 Virgin Media Music Awards, Aphrodite was voted the Best Album by British music fans. The lead single "All the Lovers" also received an award, being voted "Best Single". At the 2011 Brit Awards, Minogue received her eighth nomination for "Best International Female Solo Artist". In 2015, Vice ranked Aphrodite tenth on its list of "The 99 Greatest Dance Albums of All Time", praising the album's relentless energy.

== Commercial performance ==
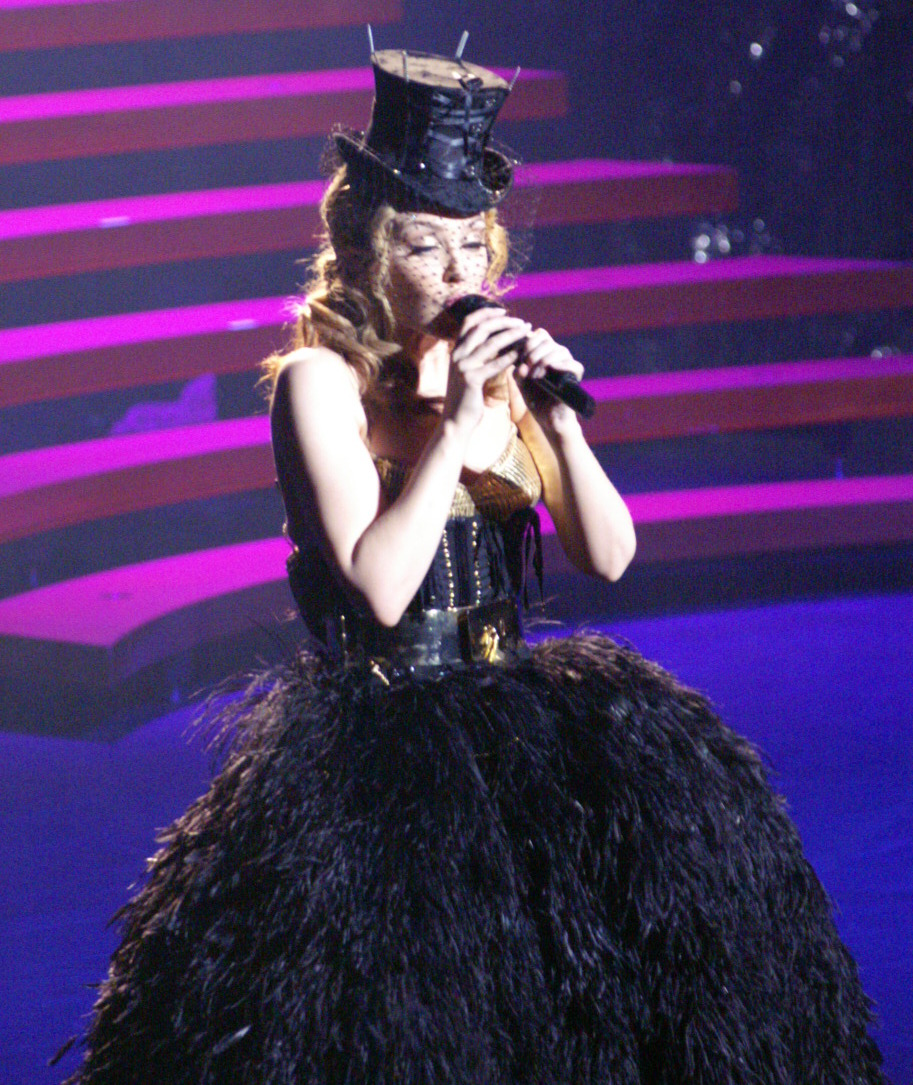
Minogue performing Aphrodite's second single, "Get Outta My Way", on her Aphrodite: Les Folies tour. The song became her fifth number one on the US Hot Dance Club Songs chart.

On the chart date of 18 July 2010, Aphrodite debuted and peaked at number two on the Australian Albums chart; it stayed in the position for three weeks. It spent a total of 15 weeks on the chart, and by 2011, Aphrodite had been certified platinum by the Australian Recording Industry Association (ARIA) for shipments of 70,000 units.

Aphrodite debuted at number one on the UK Albums Chart, selling 79,152 copies in its first week. The same feat had been accomplished by Minogue's debut studio album Kylie (1988) during the same week 22 years prior. The album spent one week at number one and a total of 29 weeks in the top 40 of the chart. Aphrodite was Minogue's fifth album to top the UK chart, after Kylie, Enjoy Yourself (1989), Greatest Hits (1992), and Fever, and her tenth studio album to chart within the top 10. Minogue was recognised by the Guinness World Records as the female artist with the most consecutive decades with top-five albums in the United Kingdom. She also became the first solo artist to have a number-one album in four different decades in the United Kingdom, in the 1980s, 1990s, 2000s and 2010s. On 1 April 2011, Aphrodite was certified platinum by the British Phonographic Industry (BPI), denoting shipments in excess of 300,000 units.

The album entered and peaked at number three on the Austrian Albums Chart and stayed on the chart for a total of 10 weeks. In the Dutch-speaking Flanders region of Belgium, it entered the Ultratop chart at number six and peaked at number four, spending a total of 12 weeks on the chart. It was more successful in the French-speaking Wallonia region of the country, where it entered the Ultratop chart at number 11 and peaked at number three, spending a total of 16 weeks on the chart. Aphrodite was certified gold by the Belgian Entertainment Association (BEA) for sales of 10,000 units. The album entered and peaked at number three on the French Albums Chart, and spent a total of 23 weeks on the chart. Similarly, in Germany, it entered and peaked at number three, spending a total of 12 weeks on the chart. In Greece, Aphrodite entered the Greek International Albums Chart at number 28 and peaked at number one, spending a total of seven weeks on the chart. In Spain, the album entered the albums chart at number three and peaked at number two, spending a total of 37 weeks on the chart and becoming Minogue's highest-charting album in the region until the release of her album Tension in 2023, which also peaked at the same position. Aphrodite entered and peaked at number two in Switzerland, spending a total of 13 weeks on the chart. The album debuted at number one on the European Top 100 Albums chart.

Aphrodite became Minogue's highest-charting album in Canada to date by peaking at number eight on the Canadian Albums Chart. In the United States, the album debuted at number 19 on the Billboard 200 with 18,000 copies sold in its first week; it marked Minogue's second highest-peaking album on the chart, behind Fever, which peaked at number three. The album also reached number two on the Dance/Electronic Albums chart. As of April 2011, Aphrodite had sold 50,000 copies in the US.

== Track listing ==
Aphrodite – Standard version
No.	Title	Writer(s)	Producer(s)	Length
1.	"All the Lovers"	Jim Eliot; Mima Stilwell	Eliot; Stuart Price^{[a]}	3:20
2.	"Get Outta My Way"	Lucas Secon; Damon Sharpe; Peter Wallevik; Daniel Davidsen; Mich Hansen	Cutfather; Wallevik; Davidsen; Sharpe^{[b]}; Secon^{[b]}; Price^{[b]}	3:38
3.	"Put Your Hands Up (If You Feel Love)"	Fin Dow-Smith; Miriam Nervo; Olivia Nervo	Starsmith; Price^{[b]}^{[c]}; M. Nervo^{[c]}; O. Nervo^{[c]}	3:37
4.	"Closer"	Price; Beatrice Hatherley	Price	3:09
5.	"Everything Is Beautiful"	Tim Rice-Oxley; Fraser T. Smith	Smith	3:25
6.	"Aphrodite"	Nerina Pallot; Andy Chatterley	Chatterley; Pallot; Price^{[a]}	3:45
7.	"Illusion"	Kylie Minogue; Price	Price	3:21
8.	"Better than Today"	Pallot; Chatterley	Chatterley; Pallot; Price^{[a]}	3:25
9.	"Too Much"	Minogue; Calvin Harris; Jake Shears	Harris	3:16
10.	"Cupid Boy"	Sebastian Ingrosso; Magnus Lidehäll; Nick Clow; Luciana Caporaso	Price; Ingrosso; Magnus	4:26
11.	"Looking for an Angel"	Minogue; Price	Price	3:49
12.	"Can't Beat the Feeling"	Hannah Robinson; Pascal Gabriel; Børge Fjordheim; Matt Prime; Richard X	Price; Gabriel; Fjordheim	4:09
Total length:				43:20

Aphrodite – Japanese edition bonus track
No.	Title	Writer(s)	Producer(s)	Length
13.	"Heartstrings"	Brian Higgins; Gerard O'Connell; Jason Resch; Jaxon Bellina; Kieran Jones; Matt Gray; Miranda Cooper	Xenomania	3:15
Total length:				46:36

Aphrodite – iTunes Store Experience edition bonus track
No.	Title	Writer(s)	Producer(s)	Length
13.	"Mighty Rivers"	Bellina; Carla Marie Williams; Cooper; Higgins; O'Connell; Resch; Tim Deal	Xenomania	4:02
Total length:				47:21

Aphrodite – Amazon MP3 and BigPond bonus track
No.	Title	Writer(s)	Producer(s)	Length
13.	"Go Hard or Go Home"	Davidsen; Hansen; Secon; Sharpe; Thomas Sardorf	Cutfather; Sardorf; Davidsen; Sharpe^{[b]}; Secon^{[b]}	3:43
Total length:				47:02

Aphrodite – Experience edition and Japanese limited edition bonus DVD
No.	Title	Length
1.	"White Diamond Theme" (live from the For You, for Me tour)	2:16
2.	"White Diamond" (live from the For You, for Me tour)	3:06
3.	"Confide in Me" (live from the For You, for Me tour)	4:51
4.	"I Believe in You" (live from the For You, for Me tour)	2:59
5.	"Making of the 'All the Lovers' video shoot"	13:00
6.	"Behind the scenes of the Aphrodite photo shoot"	2:32
7.	"Image gallery"	3:49
8.	"Exclusive interview with Kylie Minogue and Stuart Price" (accessed online with code from collectable sticker)	39:36
Total length:		72:09

Aphrodite – Les Folies Tour Edition (Disc two)
No.	Title	Length
1.	"Put Your Hands Up (If You Feel Love)" (Pete Hammond remix)	7:54
2.	"Aphrodite" (Denzal Park remix)	6:21
3.	"Cupid Boy" (Stereogamous dub)	7:00
4.	"Get Outta My Way" (Paul Harris vocal remix)	7:15
5.	"All the Lovers" (WAWA & MMB anthem remix)	6:16
6.	"Put Your Hands Up (If You Feel Love)" (Muscles club remix)	5:06
7.	"Better than Today" (Bimbo Jones remix)	3:07
8.	"Higher" (Taio Cruz featuring Kylie Minogue)	3:25
Total length:		46:24

Aphrodite – Les Folies Tour Edition (Disc three)
No.	Title	Producer(s)	Length
1.	"20 Minute Party Remix"	Denzal Park	19:51

Notes

- ^{^[a]} signifies an additional producer
- ^{^[b]} signifies a co-producer
- ^{^[c]} signifies a vocal producer

== Personnel ==
Credits adapted from the liner notes of Aphrodite.

=== Musicians ===
- Kylie Minogue – lead vocals, backing vocals
- Mima Stilwell – additional backing vocals (track 1)
- Jim Eliot – piano, keys, bass, drum programming (track 1)
- Peter Wallevik – keyboards, programming (track 2)
- Daniel Davidsen – keyboards, programming, guitars (track 2)
- Mich Hansen – percussion (track 2)
- Lucas Secon – additional keyboards (track 2)
- Alexandra Segal – additional backing vocals (track 2)
- Maime Hladiy – bass (track 2)
- Olivia Nervo – additional backing vocals (track 3)
- Miriam Nervo – additional backing vocals (track 3)
- Beatrice Hatherley – additional backing vocals (track 4)
- Tim Rice-Oxley – piano, keyboards (track 5)
- Fraser T. Smith – guitars (track 5)
- Nerina Pallot – additional backing vocals, acoustic guitar, piano, keyboards, synth, electric guitar (tracks 6, 8)
- Andy Chatterley – piano, keyboards, synth, drum programming (tracks 6, 8)
- Stuart Price – additional keyboards (track 6)
- Ben Vella – electric guitar (tracks 6, 8)
- Calvin Harris – all instruments, arrangements (track 9)
- Pascal Gabriel – all instruments (track 12)
- Børge Fjordheim – all instruments (track 12)
- Hannah Robinson – backing vocals (track 12)
- Richard X – Minimoog operation, keyboards (track 12)

=== Technical ===
- Jim Eliot – production (track 1)
- Stuart Price – additional production (tracks 1, 6, 8); mixing (tracks 1–4, 6–8, 10–12); co-production (tracks 2, 3); vocal production (track 3); production (tracks 4, 7, 10–12); additional backing vocals recording (track 6); additional vocals recording (track 8); executive production
- Dave Emery – mixing assistance (tracks 1–4, 6–8, 11, 12)
- Cutfather – production (track 2)
- Peter Wallevik – production (track 2)
- Daniel Davidsen – production (track 2)
- Damon Sharpe – co-production, recording (track 2)
- Lucas Secon – co-production (track 2)
- Pete Hofmann – recording, Pro Tools editing (track 2)
- Mads Nilsson – mixing (track 2)
- Starsmith – production, mixing (track 3)
- Olivia Nervo – vocal production (track 3)
- Miriam Nervo – vocal production (track 3)
- Fraser T. Smith – production, mixing (track 5)
- Beatriz Artola – engineering (track 5)
- Andy Chatterley – production, engineering, recording (tracks 6, 8)
- Nerina Pallot – production, engineering, recording (tracks 6, 8)
- Jason Tarver – engineering assistance (tracks 6, 8)
- Nathan Khors – recording assistance (tracks 7, 11)
- Brian Gottshall – recording assistance (tracks 7, 11)
- Calvin Harris – production, mixing (track 9)
- Sebastian Ingrosso – production, mixing (track 10)
- Magnus – production, mixing (track 10)
- Pascal Gabriel – production (track 12)
- Børge Fjordheim – production (track 12)
- Geoff Pesche – mastering

=== Artwork ===
- William Baker – photography
- Digital Light – photographic post-production
- Adjective Noun – art direction, design

== Charts ==
=== Weekly charts ===
Chart performance for Aphrodite in 2010–11
Chart (2010–11)	Peak position
Australian Albums (ARIA)	2
Austrian Albums (Ö3 Austria)	3
Belgian Albums (Ultratop Flanders)	4
Belgian Albums (Ultratop Wallonia)	3
Canadian Albums (Billboard)	8
Croatian International Albums (HDU)	10
Czech Albums (ČNS IFPI)	5
Danish Albums (Hitlisten)	21
Dutch Albums (Album Top 100)	4
European Albums (Billboard)	1
Finnish Albums (Suomen virallinen lista)	22
French Albums (SNEP)	3
German Albums (Offizielle Top 100)	3
Greek International Albums (IFPI)	1
Hungarian Albums (MAHASZ)	18
Irish Albums (IRMA)	5
Italian Albums (FIMI)	9
Japanese Albums (Oricon)	28
Mexican Albums (Top 100 Mexico)	22
New Zealand Albums (RMNZ)	11
Norwegian Albums (VG-lista)	16
Polish Albums (ZPAV)	6
Scottish Albums (Official Charts)	1
South Korean Albums (Gaon)	41
South Korean International Albums (Gaon)	7
Spanish Albums (Promusicae)	2
Swedish Albums (Sverigetopplistan)	9
Swiss Albums (Schweizer Hitparade)	2
Swiss Albums (Les charts Romandy)	2
UK Albums (Official Charts)	1
US Billboard 200	19
US Top Dance Albums (Billboard)	2
US Indie Store Album Sales (Billboard)	7

=== Year-end charts ===
2010 year-end chart performance for Aphrodite
Chart (2010)	Position
Australian Albums (ARIA)	55
European Albums (Billboard)	54
French Albums (SNEP)	149
Swiss Albums (Schweizer Hitparade)	77
UK Albums (OCC)	45
US Top Dance/Electronic Albums (Billboard)	20

== Certifications and sales ==
Certification and sales for Aphrodite
Region	Certification	Certified units/sales
Australia (ARIA)	Platinum	70,000^{^}
Belgium (BRMA)	Gold	15,000^{*}
United Kingdom (BPI)	Platinum	335,474
United States	—	50,000
^{*} Sales figures based on certification alone.^{^} Shipments figures based on certification alone.

== Release history ==
Release dates and formats for Aphrodite
Region	Date	Format	Edition	Label	Ref.
Japan	30 June 2010	CD	Standard	EMI	
Japan	30 June 2010	CD + DVD	Limited	EMI	
Australia	2 July 2010	CD; CD + DVD; digital download; LP	Standard; Experience Edition	Warner	
Germany	2 July 2010	CD; CD + DVD; digital download; LP	Standard; Experience Edition	EMI	
Spain	2 July 2010	CD; CD + DVD; digital download; LP	Standard; Experience Edition	EMI	
France	5 July 2010	CD; CD + DVD; digital download; LP	Standard; Experience Edition	EMI	
United Kingdom	5 July 2010	CD; CD + DVD; digital download; LP	Standard; Experience Edition	Parlophone	
United States	6 July 2010	CD; CD + DVD; digital download; LP	Standard; Experience Edition	Capitol	
Australia	3 June 2011	3-CD; digital download	Les Folies Tour Edition	Warner	
Australia	18 November 2011	CD + book	The Goddess Edition	Warner	
Various	7 August 2026	LP record	2026 reissue	Parlophone	

== See also ==
- List of 2010s UK Albums Chart number ones
- List of European number-one hits of 2010
- List of number-one albums of 2010 (Australia)
