= Kylie Minogue's 2009 North American tour =

2009 concert tour by Kylie Minogue

North American tour
- Tour by Kylie Minogue
- Location: North America
- Start date: 30 September 2009
- End date: 13 October 2009
- Legs: 1
- No. of shows: 9
- Box office: $3.1 million ($4.65 million in 2025 dollars)

Kylie Minogue concert chronology
- KylieX2008 (2008); North American tour (2009); Aphrodite: Les Folies Tour (2011)

In 2009, Australian singer Kylie Minogue embarked on her first concert tour of North America, her eleventh concert tour at that point in her career. The tour took place following the release of her tenth studio album X (2007), and featured new material from her then-upcoming eleventh studio album, Aphrodite (2010).

Minogue had initially given the tour the working title For You, For Me upon its announcement; however, this name was not retained, with certain promotional materials later referencing the tour as KylieUSA2009. The nine-date mini-tour began on 30 September 2009 at the Fox Theatre in Oakland, California, and concluded on 13 October 2009 in New York City, after three nights at the famed Hammerstein Ballroom. The tour and concerts received favourable reviews from music critics, and grossed over US$3 million (or roughly $4.5 million in 2026).

== Background ==
In 2002, there was speculation Minogue would bring her Fever tour to the U.S. and Canada, after the success of Fever and its singles in those territories. It was originally believed Minogue did not want to scale down the show for smaller venues but later revealed she was swayed by her management to not perform in the U.S. and Canada. However, Minogue did tour the U.S. with Jingle Ball, an annual concert festival produced on by KIIS-FM, visiting Boston, Anaheim, Houston, Miami, Philadelphia, New York City, and Seattle.

The tour was officially announced via Billboard on 6 May 2009. When asked about the name of the tour, she remarked, "It was For You, For Me. And maybe that’s going to stick, I’m not sure." This working title was not retained further.

Minogue stated, "I've wanted to tour in America and Canada for years now and know that fans have been waiting a long time for this. I'm thrilled that the opportunity has finally arrived." Bill Silva (CEO of Bill Silva Presents) stated, "Kylie has such a successful career outside of North America that it has taken quite a while to find a window in her schedule for the U.S. and Canada. Her amazing fans in North America will be well rewarded for their patience when they experience her show and its entire spectacle." Minogue promoted the tour on the fourth hour of the Today Show in New York stating that she's always wanted to tour the US, but it was a constant battle with her manager. During an interview with BlackBook magazine, Minogue spoke about her fanbase in North America: "The fans in America aren't great in number, but they're great in spirit. And they've been so patient. I think I really shocked them when I said I was touring, because they've become accepting of the fact that it was never going to happen. But I meant it, all the years I spent saying I would love to tour the States" and what they should expect from the tour: "I decided not to go somewhere I've never been before, direction-wise, because American audiences haven't seen my live shows for the most part. So we decided—and I guess it works well in these financial times—to bring with us a "best of" my different tours". Jean Paul Gaultier created some of the outfits for the show.

Minogue later commented on the tour, stating, "It was a micro-tour, but I've got to tell you it was so rewarding [...] It was a mission from the heart… It was like… setting my wallet on fire because basically it just made no financial sense to do it, but I just reached a point where I thought, 'That's it! I just wanna!' I got a lot of reward from it. Right back to the heart, so it was amazing."

== Synopsis ==
The show was split into six sections along with an encore. All of the costumes worn in the tour were designed for Kylie by French designer Jean Paul Gaultier. The elements of the tour drew inspiration from Kylie's earlier tours, borrowing song interpretations, screen visuals, and costumes.

The show began with an overture containing elements of "Over the Rainbow", "Somewhere" and "The Sound of Music", which leads into "Light Years", remixed by Steve Anderson. Kylie was lowered onto the stage on the skull used for "Like a Drug" on the KylieX2008 tour; following this is a new remix of "Speakerphone", followed by a new version of "Come into My World", both also remixed by Steve Anderson. After chatting to the audience Kylie would go onto sing the KylieX2008 version of "In Your Eyes", closing the section.

The second section began with a slightly altered version of the "Everything Taboo Medley" used in the Homecoming Tour", but used elements and samples of "Fascinated", "Ride on Time", "The Real Slim Shady" and "Buffalo Gals", the latter two used in the Fever Tour and did not use the "Step Back in Time" sample. Following this medley, Kylie went on to perform "Better than Today", which was from her then-upcoming eleventh studio album.

The third section began with "Like a Drug", using the intro used on the X Tour; during this section a white version of the "erotic bellboy" outfit worn to sing "Like a Drug" for the X Tour was used. Following "Like a Drug", the "Boombox" / "Can't Get You Out of My Head" mashup was performed, which incorporated the screen visuals of "Can't Get You Out of My Head" used in the Money Can't Buy one-off concert and the KylieX2008 tour. After this, Kylie performed the X Tour version of "Slow" without the "Free" excerpt. To close the section, Kylie introduced the band and performed "2 Hearts".

The fourth section began with a slightly different version of "Red Blooded Woman" used in both the Showgirl Tour and Showgirl Homecoming Tour, but still used the "Where the Wild Roses Grow" excerpt; this performance blended the two performances in the aforementioned tours, using the pommel horse from the Homecoming Tour and the choreography from the Showgirl Tour. This was followed by a small dance interlude titled "Heart Beat Rock Segue" that included elements of the song "Mickey". "Wow" then closed the section.

The fifth section began with a small instrumental intro, titled "White Diamond Theme", which used excerpts and quotes from various films and actresses; this was followed by a performance of the ballad version of "White Diamond", which was followed by the Showgirl Tour version of "Confide in Me", then the ballad version of "I Believe in You", used on the X Tour. Throughout the performance of the latter, the screen visuals used in the "Crying Game Medley" during the Fever Tour were used, as well as the falling rose petals used in the tour too.

The penultimate section began with the mashup of Kylie's "Burning Up" and Madonna's "Vogue"; this was followed by the jazz version of "The Locomotion" used in the Showgirl Tours. It was at this point in the show that "On a Night Like This" was supposed to be performed, however it was not performed at any dates of the tour. Following "The Locomotion", Kylie and her backing vocalists sang "Kids" before Kylie closed the main body of the show with a performance of "In My Arms".

The encore began with a performance of "Better the Devil You Know", which was used in some shows of the KylieX2008 tour, followed by "The One" (except on 3, 4 and 12 October where it was removed from the set). At all shows, the closing song was "Love at First Sight".

== Critical reception ==
For the most part, the tour received rave reviews. After being "stunned by the glitz and glamour of Kylie's tour and the power it had to pull in celebs when she performed at the Palms", Vegas promoters even offered Minogue a complete residence for a show in the city.

- San Francisco Chronicle critic Aidin Vaziri gave the concert in Oakland a positive review: "It's impossible to describe the full spectacle of the Kylie experience – part Vegas extravaganza, part sci-fi adventure, all flesh. There were golden tigers, confetti showers, diamante-studded football players, digital explosions and Trojan warriors with elaborate plumes on their heads. Well, why not? [...] The fact that she fit it all into a relatively intimate venue was a marvel unto itself. The show seemed to have been designed to be visible from the moon, with large-scale video projections broadcasting studio montages of celluloid Kylie mouthing the words to the songs the real-life version was singing below. The stage swarmed with musicians, dancers and the occasional army of robots. Meanwhile, her wardrobe department seemed intent on making Lady Gaga wave a white flag. [...] Apart from a pair of middling ballads that served as a reminder that her relatively thin voice works best served with a generous heaping of bass, there were no major opening-night missteps. Rather, it was one thrill after another, especially for the fans who had waited so long for this moment."
- Rolling Stone critic Barry Walters also gave the concert in Oakland a positive review: "Minogue doesn't possess vocal power, but, like Diana Ross, her precise yet joyous phrasing sets her apart from lesser, more self-conscious upstarts. [...] As made overt during a medley of Minogue's Burning Up and Madonna's Vogue, much of Minogue's show picked up where Madge left off at her Blonde Ambition peak, a task attempted but not quite fulfilled by countless well-funded sirens. [...] The difference is that Minogue radiates a bliss that can't be bought. Even in the midst of painstaking choreography, her sense of ecstasy is utterly of the moment." In some criticism of the audio effects, Walters noted, "...throughout a set that mixed tracks from her last three albums, import singles and unreleased material, her band and blankets of reverb often overwhelmed Minogue's pop-perfect sighs. Several songs early in the evening were rendered almost unrecognizable." Walters praised Minogue's stage presence: "When necessary, Minogue can toss her tiny frame around with the agility of a professional dancer. Yet more remarkable was her poise: She made no unnecessary or ungainly movements, and at times seemed to be traveling at a speed slightly slower than gravity would ordinarily allow. At 41, she is infinitely more sexy than she was in her 20s. Her grace is improbable, yet all the more compelling for its mystery." Referencing an unexpected wave of bouncing Mylar pillows sent by fans towards the stage during her performance of "Wow", to which she responded by twirling one she grabbed "as if she'd just been handed a tremendous present", Walters said, "It takes a special kind of star to accommodate and make the most of an unplanned special effect, and Minogue is effortlessly, exactly that".
- Los Angeles Times critic Mikael Wood gave the concert a positive review: "What kind of show was Kylie Minogue's Sunday night debut at the Hollywood Bowl? The kind in which the dancers outnumbered the musicians, the backup vocalists had several costume changes and the headliner took the stage astride an enormous bejeweled skull as a small battalion of futuristic robots twirled beneath her. [...] Unlike Madonna or Lady Gaga, Minogue doesn't really trade in imperturbable cool or calculating power plays. Her act is a kinder, gentler spin on dance-pop divadom, and though Sunday's concert stop – midway through her first-ever North American tour – offered no shortage of self-aggrandizing spectacle, the effect was more welcoming than it was intimidating. Riding that sparkly cranium as it lowered from the ceiling, Minogue introduced herself not as a dictator or a goddess, but as a flight attendant on Air Kylie, here to serve our needs with style and speed. That she certainly did, zooming through nearly two dozen songs in just under two hours to the very vocal delight of her fans [...] Minogue managed Sunday to give her carefully calibrated arena-pop moves an uncommon degree of human warmth, whether she was stomping around the stage in thigh-high leather boots or cavorting with several slices of gym-rat beefcake in a simulated shower scene." Wood's only criticism of the show involved her "tedious ballad sequence inspired by Sunset Boulevard that found her adopting an Old Hollywood hauteur, which seemed at odds with the lovable character she'd spent the previous 90 minutes sketching out." Wood then finished with praise, noting that "...this is a woman who knows how to read a room [...] nobody appeared to be having anything approaching a bad time."
- Variety critic Andrew Barker gave the concert a mixed review: "Her Hollywood Bowl performance did little to explain why her brand of cosmopolitan dance pop has mostly foundered Stateside, nor will it finally sell her to American agnostics, but it nonetheless represented an impressively maximalist display of showmanship that satisfied her rabid, long-neglected fans. [...] Free of the irony and contrived confrontation of a Madonna performance or the Olympian ambition of a Beyoncé, Minogue's show was charmingly unprepossessing in its aim to provide a surplus of spectacle. [...] To describe the rest of Minogue's material is to confront a series of contradictions: Her music is relentlessly superficial yet never middlebrow, stylistically heterogeneous but not exactly diverse, sexy but rarely sexual." On her vocals, he said, "Her voice tends toward tinniness and lacks depth, yet she's obviously proficient and can hit some very big notes when required – and unlike many of her backing-track-assisted contemporaries, Minogue's vocals seemed to be entirely live." He criticized some segments of the show, saying "An aggressively energetic cabaret-style take on "Wow" late in the show finally crossed the line into cruise-ship chintziness, and the preceding setpiece, in which Minogue sang atop a pommel horse while half-naked male dancers in sequin-studded football shoulder pads cavorted quasi-pornographically around her, was uncomfortably bizarre", but praised the end of the show: "All the same, In My Arms and Love at First Sight, which closed the main set and the show, respectively, were irresistible. Both songs may be little more than empty calories, but they also represent the giddy apex of millennial dance pop, and the enthusiasm with which Minogue and the Bowl crowd belted them out suggests that the rest of America may not know what it's missing."
- Billboard critic Keith Caulfield gave the concert a glowing review: "Kylie Minogue knows how to make an entrance. For her first ever Los Angeles show at the Hollywood Bowl, the pop diva descended from the venue's famed arches standing triumphantly atop a giant metallic human skull. And that was just the beginning of the eye-popping, hits-filled run through Minogue's career that was replete with numerous costume changes, massive digital screens, dazzling laser displays and a hard working fog machine. [...] At her Bowl show, Minogue reached back far into her catalog, offering up her very first single, The Loco-Motion, as a sultry cabaret number while she also wowed the crowd with a dancetastic rendition of Can't Get You Out of My Head. Let's be clear—this wasn't a lip-syncing showcase. Minogue sang live and was in fine voice throughout her set. [...] She has repurposed some of the best moments from her previous globe-trotting outings for her first U.S. tour—thus giving American concertgoers a taste of what they've missed all these years."
- Time Out (Chicago) critic John Dugan gave the concert a glowing review: "There was only one constant last night at the UIC Pavilion, a smiling petite blond with a gold microphone—and lasers. Otherwise, everything about Kylie Minogue's first live show in Chicago changed completely about every 15 minutes—the dancers' costumes, the lighting and bold graphics flashing on the vertical scrims, the Aussie diva's wardrobe, the style of music—the whole theatrical scenario. In one two-hour show we got Barbarella-style sci-fi airline hostess ("Come into my World"), Stephen Sprouse-inspired '80s acid-house flashback ("Shocked"), buff guys showering in a gym/bathhouse while Kylie sings on a pommel horse ("Red Blooded Woman"), cheerleaders with marching-band horns ("Wow"), military chic ("Like a Drug"), Hollywood starlet on chaise longue flanked by rococo gold hounds ("White Diamond"), New Orleans brothel with Kylie in lingerie (a reworking of "Locomotion") and occasional "Toto, we're not in Kansas anymore" and video wall interludes—the whole night opened with echoes of "Somewhere Over the Rainbow." [...] The 41-year-old bounced back from breast cancer surgery and chemo to tour more than 21 countries last year—and has honed her vox, stage show, banter and occasional dancing and punched things up with live horns, [...] finally ending with a confetti shower and "Love at First Sight." For most of us, it was literally first sight—and Kylie, as small as she is, made it count."
- Time Out (New York) critic Sophie Harris gave the concert a glowing review: "The show was as razzle-dazzle a spectacle as you could feasibly put on at Hammerstein Ballroom [...] The show most impressed in its less-hysterical moments. Confide in Me had Minogue supine on a chaise longue backdropped by a ravishing sepia image of NYC. A grown woman now, she looked elegant and relaxed in vintage mode; similarly, her voice really soars into the high notes in these moodier numbers. I Believe in You was lovely; beginning restrained and then blossoming into a string-strung, shimmering climax (complete with a shower of rose petals). [...] Key to Minogue's charm is that she really seems to enjoy what she does."
- The New York Times critic Ben Ratliff gave the concert in New York City a mixed review: "The tenor of the show was household-name; the fact of the show was cult-artist. This made the concert – efficient, clobbering, expensive, generous, drenched in film and costumes and dancing – close to an alternate reality. [...] It's a long story, how she has remained apart from the American post-disco line, but it boils down to Europop's absolute foreignness: there is no Bronx in it. Ms. Minogue has studied Madonna for years, but maybe this country needs only one blonde, stadium-filling, high-camp, digital-burlesque artist at a time and Lady Gaga – who draws from both Madonna and Ms. Minogue – has dibs on that spot. Ms. Minogue's voice never definitively dropped, like Madonna's; she's still comfortable in helium range. And while Madonna dealt in transgression nearly from the start, Ms. Minogue naturally circumvents the dark parts of desire. Between songs on Tuesday she was edgeless, posing no threat or subtext. She does enjoy-your-life music, no heavy message. [...] She had a live band, for what it's worth – drums, bass, guitar and keyboards – though it all sounded like being inside a giant synthesizer. But her dancers, male and female, were invaluable. [...] Ms. Minogue is effective in complex static poses, at one with her garments; [...] But she was physical too, dancing as well as she could on high heels and walking more than once on the outstretched limbs of her dancers. [...] The concert was a stadium show intelligently compressed for 3,500 people, and that was why it worked."
- Entertainment Weekly critic Adam Markovitz gave the concert a glowing review: "Last night's show at NYC's Hammerstein Ballroom was a two-hour post-disco fantasia of strobe, bass, and glitter—an all-out spectacle worthy of her American fans' pent-up adoration. Barreling through her sizable songbook, Kylie stepped into a cast of personae—a wind-up space princess, a stomping glam rocker, a pouting screen siren—each with its own over-the-top costume and set decor. Seven jumbo screens pulsed background images for each number. Hits old, new, and soon-to-be whipped the audience into a sustained frenzy, while rose petals and confetti showered the stage at key moments." He praised her vocals and personality on stage, noting that "...this was no exercise in Spears-ian auto-pilot pop. The size of the venue demanded audience interaction, and Kylie happily chatted with the crowd throughout, taking requests for songs and dance moves from audience members who had queued up as early as 2am that morning to be front and center for the show. She lavished attention on her band, including a three piece horn section and two unfeasibly gorgeous backup singers. Fan-favorite ballads like Confide in Me and a stripped-down I Believe in You became a showcase for her voice, a surprisingly solid soprano that usually gets glazed under thick layers of processing on her recordings. [...] The crowd roared their approval, a warm NYC welcome twenty years in the making. It would be a shame to make them wait that long again."

== Broadcasts and recordings ==
In December 2009, Billboard magazine announced Minogue would release a live recording of her performance at the Hammerstein Ballroom. It contains all songs performed with the exception of "Better than Today", recorded for Minogue's next studio album. The album was released in digital format, only available to online digital media stores, on 14 December 2009.

Footage from the tour is included on the Special Edition DVD of Kylie Minogue's album, Aphrodite. It features the "White Diamond Theme", "White Diamond", "Confide in Me", and "I Believe in You".

On 3 May 2011, to celebrate the arrival of the "Aphrodite Live" leg of Kylie's Aphrodite World Tour to the United States, a digital EP was released. Besides including three songs performed by Kylie at the BBC's Live Lounge, it also featured two songs live from her 2009 concert at the Hammerstein Ballroom: "Confide in Me" and "Better than Today", the latter being the only song not included in the "Kylie: Live in New York" album.

== Set list ==
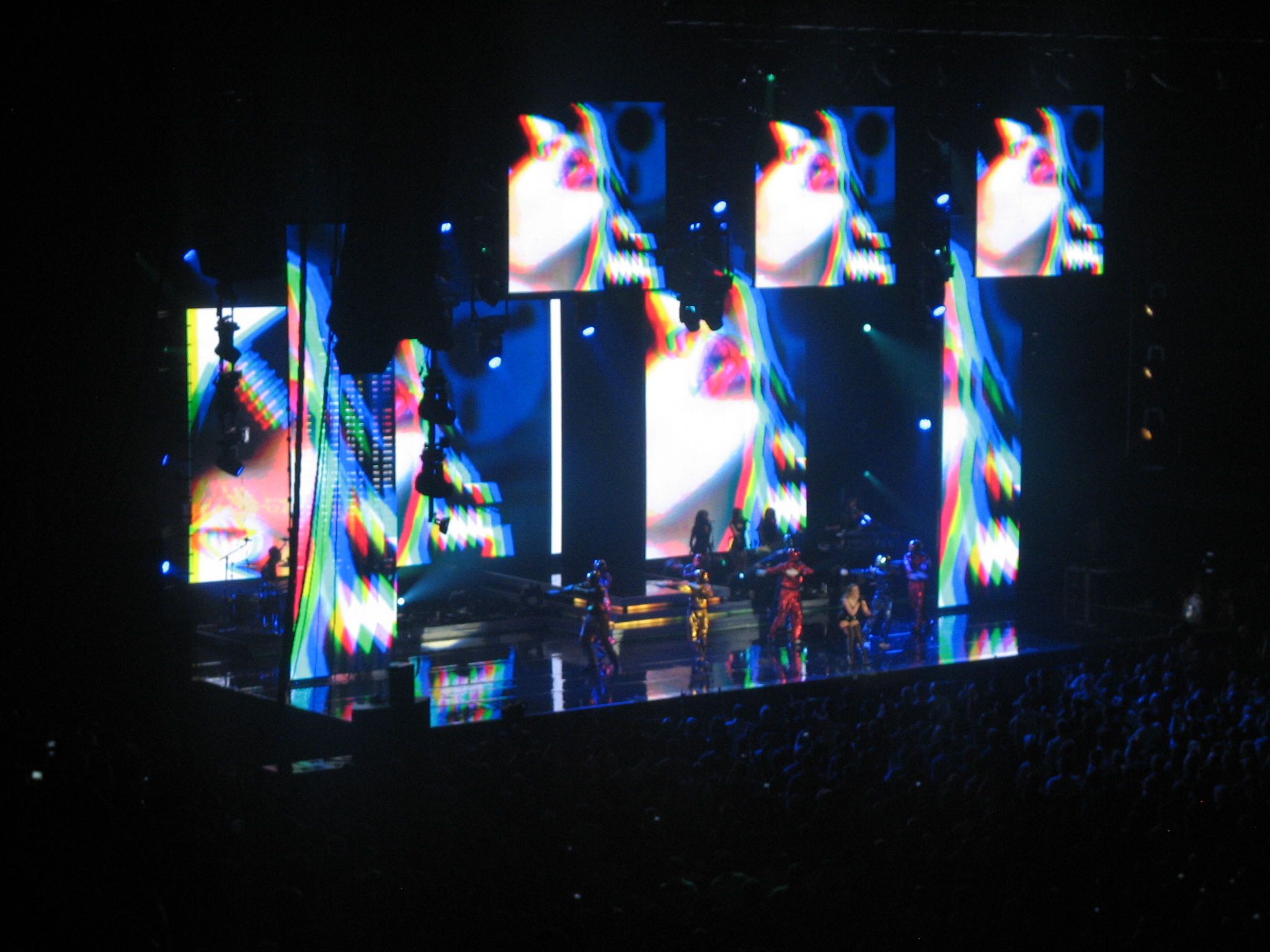
Minogue performs "In My Arms" at the Air Canada Centre, Toronto

The following set list was obtained from the 30 September 2009 concert at the Fox Oakland Theatre in Oakland. It does not represent all concerts for the duration of the tour.

Act 1

1. "Over the Rainbow" / "The Sound of Music" (Introduction)
2. "Light Years"
3. "Speakerphone"
4. "Come into My World"
5. "In Your Eyes"

Act 2

6. "Shocked" (contains excerpts from "Do You Dare?", "It's No Secret", "Give Me Just a Little More Time", "Keep on Pumpin' It" and "What Kind of Fool (Heard All That Before)")
7. "What Do I Have to Do" (contains an excerpt from "I'm Over Dreaming (Over You)")
8. "Spinning Around" (contains excerpts from and elements of "Finally", "Fascinated", "The Real Slim Shady", "Buffalo Gals", "Ride On Time" and "Such a Good Feeling")
9. "Better than Today"

Act 3

10. "Like a Drug"
11. "Boombox" / "Can't Get You Out of My Head" (contains elements of "Can't Get You Out of My Head (Greg Kurstin Remix)" and "Blue Monday")
12. "Slow"
13. "2 Hearts"

Act 4

14. "Red Blooded Woman" (contains excerpts from "Where the Wild Roses Grow")
15. "Heart Beat Rock Segue" / "Mickey" (Dance Interlude)
16. "Wow"

Act 5

17. "White Diamond Theme" (contains excerpts from various films including: "The Wizard of Oz", "Casablanca", "A Streetcar Named Desire", Sunset Boulevard, "All About Eve", "Beyond the Forest" and "Mommie Dearest", as well as quotes from Judy Garland, Marilyn Monroe, Bette Davis, Katharine Hepburn and Jayne Mansfield) (Video Interlude)
18. "White Diamond"
19. "Confide in Me"
20. "I Believe in You"

Act 6

21. "Burning Up" / "Vogue"
22. "The Locomotion"
23. "Kids"
24. "In My Arms"

Encore

25. "Better the Devil You Know"
26. "The One"
27. "Love at First Sight" (Ruff and Jam U.S. Remix)

=== Notes ===
- "Got to Be Certain" was performed a cappella at the 3 October show, as the audience requested it.
- "I Should Be So Lucky" was performed at the 3, 4 and 13 October shows.
- "Your Disco Needs You" was performed a cappella at the 7 October show, as the audience requested it while technical difficulties were being repaired. It was then performed with the band at the 9 October show. On 12 October, it was performed a cappella once more.
- "The One" was removed from the set at the 3, 4 and 12 October shows.

== Tour dates ==
List of 2009 concerts, showing date, city, country, venue, number of tickets sold (from available) and total gross revenue.
| Date (2009) | City | Country | Venue | Attendance | Revenue |
|---|---|---|---|---|---|
| 30 September | Oakland | United States | Fox Theatre | 5,280 / 5,592 | $401,709 |
| 1 October | Oakland | United States | Fox Theatre | 5,280 / 5,592 | $401,709 |
| 3 October 2009 | Las Vegas | United States | Pearl Concert Theater | 2,394 / 2,394 | $222,265 |
| 4 October | Los Angeles | United States | Hollywood Bowl | 8,108 / 8,504 | $749,957 |
| 7 October (Note: The 7 October 2009 concert at UIC Pavilion in Chicago was originally scheduled to take place at the Congress Theater.) | Chicago | United States | UIC Pavilion | 4,021 / 4,021 | $299,536 |
| 9 October | Toronto | Canada | Air Canada Centre | 7,679 / 7,837 | $568,604 |
| 11 October | New York | United States | Hammerstein Ballroom | 9,650 / 10,100 | $853,150 |
| 12 October | New York | United States | Hammerstein Ballroom | 9,650 / 10,100 | $853,150 |
| 13 October | New York | United States | Hammerstein Ballroom | 9,650 / 10,100 | $853,150 |
| Total | | | | 37,132 / 38,448 (97%) | $3,095,221 |

== Personnel ==
Adapted from the For You, For Me credits.

- William Baker – director
- Alan MacDonald – stage designer
- Nick Whitehouse – lighting designer
- Tom Colbourne – video director
- Lorenzo Cornacchia – laser and effects designer
- Steve Anderson – musical director, producer, mixing, programmer
- Sarah deCourcy – musical director, band director, keyboards
- Kylie Minogue – lead vocals
- Roxanne Wilde – backing vocals
- Lucita Jules – backing vocals
- Jenni Tarma – bass
- Matthew Racher – drums
- Adrian Eccleston – guitar
- Gary Bradshaw – recording
- Graeme Blevins – saxophone
- Barnaby Dickinson – trombone
- Graeme Flowers – trumpet
