= Get Outta My Way =

2010 single by Kylie Minogue

Single by Kylie Minogue

from the album Aphrodite
- Released: 27 September 2010
- Studio: Metropolis (London, United Kingdom); Central Command (Los Angeles, United States)
- Genre: Dance-pop; electropop
- Length: 3:39 (album version); 3:39 (single version); 3:17 (US radio edit)
- Label: Parlophone
- Songwriters: Mich Hansen; Lucas Secon; Damon Sharpe; Peter Wallevik; Daniel Davidsen
- Producers: Cutfather; Peter Wallevik; Daniel Davidsen; Damon Sharpe; Lucas Secon; Stuart Price

Kylie Minogue singles chronology
"All the Lovers" (2010)	"Get Outta My Way" (2010)	"Higher" (2010)

Music video
- "Get Outta My Way" on YouTube

"Get Outta My Way" is a song recorded by Australian recording artist Kylie Minogue for her eleventh studio album Aphrodite (2010). "Get Outta My Way" was written and produced by Mich Hansen, Lucas Secon, Damon Sharpe, Peter Wallevik, Daniel Davidsen alongside Stuart Price, who served as an additional producer. Due to its popularity as an album cut, the song was released as the second official single worldwide on 27 September 2010 by Parlophone. "Get Outta My Way" is a dance-pop and electropop song with disco influences. The lyrics of the song discusses Minogue's decision in moving on from a relationship and beginning a new one immediately.

"Get Outta My Way" received positive reviews from music critics who commended it for its production and lyrics. The song peaked at number 12 in the United Kingdom, making it her first physical single to miss the top ten since "Breathe", and peaked at number 69 in Australia, making it her least successful single at the time. It performed averagely in Europe, including Spain, Denmark, France, and Germany. "Get Outta My Way" performed rather well in South and North America; it was a number-one hit on the US Hot Dance Club Songs chart and peaked at number one in Brazil.

The music video for the song was shot in London and was released in September 2010. The video features Minogue in a room with dancers, both performing and dancing to the song while it was provided with extensive visual and digital programming. Critical reception towards the video was favourable, with many critics enjoying its visual effects, fashion and dancing. Minogue performed the song on America's Got Talent, her first television performance in the United States in two years and Dancing with The Stars and The Tonight Show with Jay Leno. Additionally, she sang the song on her Aphrodite World Tour, Kiss Me Once Tour, Kylie Summer 2015, Golden Tour, and Tension Tour. "Get Outta My Way" was sampled by EDM producer Alesso in his single "Cool" in 2015.

== Background ==
In July 2010, Minogue released the highly anticipated Aphrodite. Achieving positive commentary from many music critics, the album was a commercial success, peaking inside the top ten in Scotland, the UK, Australia, and majority of the European continent. The lead single, "All the Lovers", was released two months prior.

Minogue confirmed that "Get Outta My Way" would be released as the second single at the album launch party in Ibiza on 5 July 2010. The song was first made available to the public in the promotional megamix of the album prior to release. "Get Outta My Way" was written and produced by Lucas Secon, Damon Sharpe, Peter Wallevik, Daniel Davidsen and Cutfather, and co-produced by Stuart Price.

== Composition ==
"Get Outta My Way"
A 20-second sample of the song's chorus

"Get Outta My Way" is a dance-pop and electropop-oriented song which is set in a disco-oriented beat. According to the sheet music published at Musicnotes.com, by EMI Music Publishing, the song is written in the key of A major. Minogue's vocals span between F♯_{3} to E_{5}. In September 2010, Minogue was interviewed about the song. She said "'Get Outta My Way' is "pure pop dance and that's what I'm all about [...] The energy is really infectious. I think it's a great song and I'm thrilled that I got to record it." She later concluded saying "I like the defiance in the song [...] It's also got a bit of a wink of the eye at the same time." In an interview with HitQuarters, Secon described the track as "sexy electro disco with some clever lyrics and some real catchy melodies." He said the song wasn't written for any particular artist and at one point four different artists wanted to cut it as their first single before it was claimed by Minogue.

The song focuses on a "frustrated and furious" Minogue delivering "wispy" vocals in a form of a warning to her uncaring partner, indicating that she may leave him and start "grinding away with another chap". Its lyrical content is suggestive in nature. According to Mayer Nissim from Digital Spy, the song talks about "A tale of an unsatisfied lover sitting her man down and grinding away with another chap as a warning might'nt get the nod from most marriage counsellors [...]" He then commented on the melodic composition, commenting; "but it's perfect subject matter for a bouncy and unpretentious instant disco-pop classic. With its basic heartbeat rhythm, simply-layered sounds and classic arrangement." Nima Baniamer from Contactmusic.com said "[Get Outta My Way] is a flamboyant explosion of pop, synth and dance" and she also noted the similarities to her previous 1990s songs, saying "With a thumping beat and a chorus that is as catchy as hell, this single is sure to carry on Kylie's string of triumphs." According to Jon Pareles from The New York Times, who cited Aphrodite as the Critics Choice, commented "Even in "Get Outta My Way", which stages a voyeuristic ménage à trois – "see me with him and it’s turning you on" – the music goes bounding along, chipper and indifferent." PrefixMag commented that the production off "both tracks (and "Put Your Hands Up") are all synths and thumps, or readymade pogo machines designed to incite a perma-state (physical or mental) of arms-up feet-jumping. Crafted songs are passed on in favor of the structure du jour: chorus, chorus, chorus."

== Critical reception ==
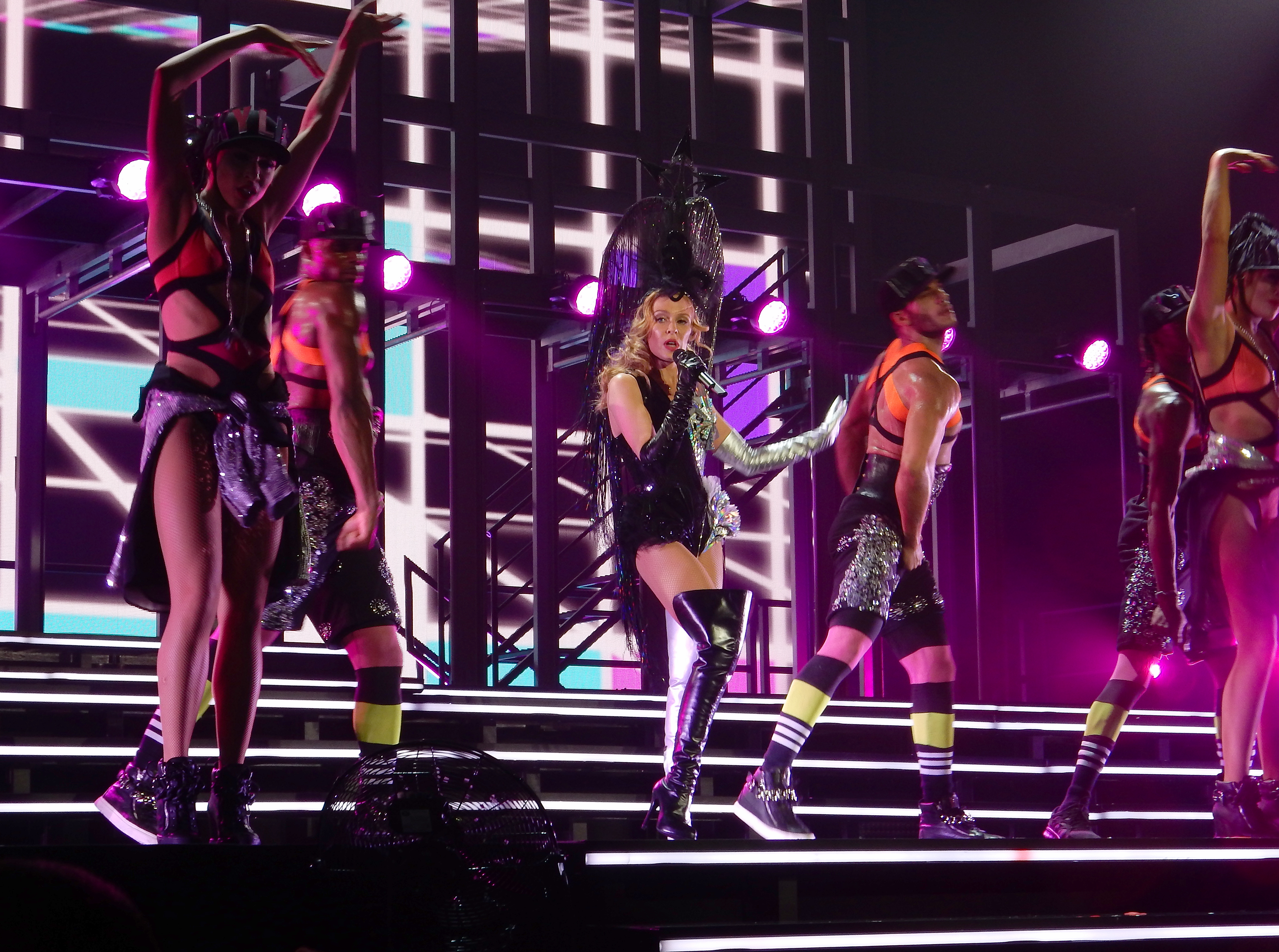
Minogue, surrounded by dancers, performing "Get Outta My Way" during her Kiss Me Once Tour (2014)

"Get Outta My Way" received positive reviews from most contemporary music critics. Tim Sendra from Allmusic said that the song features some "sass" which was needed through the album. Digital Spy's Mayer Nissim gave the song four out of five stars, and wrote: "With its basic heartbeat rhythm, simply-layered sounds and classic arrangement, it's probably the warmest and most unsophisticated thing Kylie's put on plastic in a decade, but it really is all the better for it." Christel Loar from PopMatters gave the song a positive review, stating that the tracks "pulsing pull is irresistible even as Kylie tells her guy exactly what’s going to happen if he just sits there". Rob Sheffield from Rolling Stone commented that "these days Minogue has countless hipster club kids on her gilded jock, from La Roux to Gaga, but "Get Outta My Way" shows why she's still the leader". Nui Te Koha from the Herald Sun stated that the track contains "italo-house piano lines that melt into al dente beats in which Kylie ponders chances and change." Ian Wade from Entertainment Weekly said the song "should destroy every dancefloor between here and the furthest reaches of the universe."

However, Scott Kara from the New Zealand Herald said that the song actually sounds like it came out of a "SodaStream Machine". Although Nikki from Pop Reviews Now gave it a positive review for it being a "brilliant song", they did mention that the song sounds like "jell-o, it's very tasty but it's rather light for food.". Although Nima Banaimer from Contactmusic.com gave it a positive review for as a single release, she also however said it was "dated".

== Chart performance ==
"Get Outta My Way" debuted at number 86 on the UK Singles Chart, and eventually peaked at number 12, staying in the charts for eight weeks. The song also peaked at number 11 in Scotland and number 33 in Ireland. "Get Outta My Way" became Minogue's first physical single since "Breathe" in 1998 not to peak inside the top ten in the United Kingdom; though "The One" peaked at number 36 in 2008, it was released digitally. It was later certified Silver by the British Phonographic Industry in June 2023, denoting sales and streams equivalent to 200,000 units.

The single proved to be moderately successful across Europe, where it peaked at number 29 in France (where it spent 16 weeks on the chart), 23 in Switzerland, 41 in Germany and 25 on the European Hot 100 Singles chart. However, the song enjoyed better success in Spain, where it debuted at number 43, and peaked at number 11, being present for eight weeks on the chart. The song also had success in Denmark, where it initially debuted at number 17 before re-entering at number 16 on the chart and later peaking at number 12.

In Minogue's native Australia, the song wasn't as successful; it debuted at number 69, spending two overall weeks in the top one-hundred, thus making it Minogue's least successful single on the ARIA Singles Chart to date, and her first single in eighteen years not to make the top fifty since 1992's "Finer Feelings". The song wasn't as successful in New Zealand either, where it debuted at number 74 on the New Zealand Official Airplay Chart, and eventually peaked at number 69 as well, resulting as Minogue's lowest single in that country. The song peaked at number 57 on the Japan Hot 100.

Despite the overall commercial disappointment, "Get Outta My Way" peaked at number one on the US Hot Dance Club Songs chart after originally debuting at number 35 and ascending steadily. It became Minogue's fifth number one on the chart and her second from the album Aphrodite. Subsequently, Minogue's next two singles, "Better than Today" and "Higher" (her duet with Taio Cruz), both also reached number one on the Hot Dance Club Songs chart. As of March 2011, the single had sold 66,000 digital units in the US.

== Music video ==
The music video was filmed at Pinewood Studios in London on 18 August 2010, was directed by British directing team AlexandLiane, and features live projections by Frieder Weiss. It premiered on Minogue's official YouTube channel on 3 September 2010. A good part of the video shows the projections of Weiss.

The video begins with Minogue and her dancers moving slowly on a dynamic, fuchsia and mimetic dance floor. Each one of them is surrounded by a glow that follows their movements in real time. Minogue has sports gloves that illuminate her face and body. In the second verse of the song, she appears on stage with white chairs, wearing a gold outfit. The chairs are incorporated to the choreography. Minogue and her dancers later appear dancing in front of a wall that projects more dynamic lighting. Minogue appears on pedestal, which arises from a delicate layer of water. Following an instrumental solo, Minogue walks up a white stairway towards a simulated Sun, accompanied by dancers. The music video then shows a rapid mix of all the previous scenes in the video, returning at the end to the initial dancers on the floor with Minogue.

Entertainment Weekly said that "It’s literally just a super-hot Kylie dancing and writhing around on the floor, wearing an endless array of fabulous outfits and being generally beautiful. To put it simply, it’s a video that just makes you smile." AaronAndAndy.com said that Kylie looks "fierce as fuck with one of the hottest knuckledusters in history!". They compared the video to the ones for "In Your Eyes" and "Slow", and said that "Stylie Kylie is back!". Becky Bain from Idolator gave it a positive review, as she said extensively "["Get Outta My Way"] is like a futuristic electro cabaret act, and the Aussie pop legend looks absolutely flawless sprawling around an interactive dancefloor." On YouTube, the official video isn't released worldwide, with copyright ground rules. She later released remixes of the video by 7th Heaven. On 7 January 2012, Minogue had released a sort-of music video off the Bimbo Jones Radio edit version. The video was for a shooting for VS Magazine. It shows Minogue dancing and staring into the camera while dancing to the song. The video for "Get Outta My Way" was unblocked on YouTube in early 2015 with views accumulating 13 million.

== Live performances ==
Minogue's first performance of "Get Outta My Way" was on 5 June 2010 at the nightclub Splash in New York City, where she unveiled a megamix of her album. She performed the song on British comedy chat show Alan Carr: Chatty Man on 18 July 2010 and on Australian variety show Hey Hey It's Saturday on 21 July 2010. She performed the song on America's Got Talent on 25 August 2010, her first television performance in the United States in two years, to promote Aphrodite. On 12 September 2010 Minogue sang "All the Lovers" and "Get Outta My Way" during the finale of Miss Italia. Minogue appeared on German television on the Oliver Pocher Show on 17 September, and performed the song on Schlag den Raab on 18 September. She later performed it on Paul O'Grady Live on 24 September 2010. She also performed it, as part of a hits medley, in her first ever performance in Mexico, on 23 October 2010. She later performed the song on the Mexican show "Decadas". She performed it in the US on Dancing with The Stars and The Tonight Show with Jay Leno on 26, 27 October. She also performed the song at the Macy's Thanksgiving Day Parade in New York City on 25 November 2010 and on The X Factor Ukraine in 2011.

== Formats and track listings ==
European and UK 2-track CD single

1. "Get Outta My Way" (Single Version) – 3:39
2. "Get Outta My Way" (7th Heaven Radio Edit) – 3:36

European and UK CD maxi-single; Australian CD maxi-single

1. "Get Outta My Way" (Single Version) – 3:39
2. "Get Outta My Way" (Bimbo Jones Club Mix - Radio Edit) – 3:35
3. "Get Outta My Way" (Sidney Samson Remix) – 5:35
4. "Get Outta My Way" (Paul Harris Remix) – 7:19
5. "Get Outta My Way" (Mat Zo Remix) – 8:30
6. "Get Outta My Way" (Enhanced Video)

European and UK 7-inch picture disc

1. "Get Outta My Way" (Single Version) – 3:39
2. "Get Outta My Way" (Bimbo Jones Piano Mix - Radio Edit) – 3:35

International digital EP

1. "Get Outta My Way" (Single Version) – 3:39
2. "Get Outta My Way" (Bimbo Jones Piano Mix - Radio Edit) – 3:35
3. "Get Outta My Way" (Sidney Samson Remix) – 5:35
4. "Get Outta My Way" (7th Heaven Radio Edit) – 3:35
5. "Get Outta My Way" (Paul Harris Dub) – 7:36
6. "Get Outta My Way" (Daddy's Groove Magic Island Rework) – 8:02
7. "Get Outta My Way" (SDP Extended Mix) – 5:43

International digital EP (iTunes exclusive)

1. "Get Outta My Way" (Single Version) – 3:39
2. "Get Outta My Way" (Bimbo Jones Piano Mix - Radio Edit) – 3:35
3. "Get Outta My Way" (Paul Harris Remix - Radio Edit) – 4:49
4. "Get Outta My Way" (Kris Menace Remix) – 6:47
5. "Get Outta My Way" (Daddy's Groove Magic Island Rework) – 8:02
6. "Get Outta My Way" (BeatauCue Remix) – 5:01
7. "Get Outta My Way" (Steve Anderson's Pacha Extended Mix) – 6:44

US digital remix EP 1

1. "Get Outta My Way" (SDP Extended Mix) – 5:43
2. "Get Outta My Way" (Daddy's Groove Magic Island Rework) – 8:02
3. "Get Outta My Way" (Mat Zo Remix) – 8:30
4. "Get Outta My Way" (Kris Menace Remix) – 6:47
5. "Get Outta My Way" (Sidney Samson Remix) – 5:35
6. "Get Outta My Way" (Steve Anderson's Pacha Extended Mix) – 6:44

US digital remix EP 2

1. "Get Outta My Way" (7th Heaven Remix) – 7:55
2. "Get Outta My Way" (7th Heaven Radio Edit) – 3:35
3. "Get Outta My Way" (Paul Harris Remix) – 7:19
4. "Get Outta My Way" (Paul Harris Dub) – 7:36
5. "Get Outta My Way" (BeatauCue Remix) – 5:01

US digital remix EP 3

1. "Get Outta My Way" (Bimbo Jones Piano Mix) – 6:51
2. "Get Outta My Way" (Bimbo Jones Club Mix) – 6:51
3. "Get Outta My Way" (Bimbo Jones Piano Mix - Radio Edit) – 3:35
4. "Get Outta My Way" (Bimbo Jones Club Mix - Radio Edit) – 3:35

Japanese exclusive digital single

1. "Get Outta My Way" (Yasutaka Nakata Remix) – 5:28

== Credits and personnel ==
- Kylie Minogue – vocals and backing vocals
- Lucas Secon – songwriting, co-production and additional keyboards
- Damon Sharpe – songwriting, co-production and recording
- Peter Wallevik – songwriting, production, keyboards and programming
- Daniel Davidsen – songwriting, production, keyboards, programming and guitars
- Cutfather – songwriting, production and percussion
- Stuart Price – executive producer, co-production and mixing
- Pete Hofmann – recording and Pro Tools editing
- Alexandra Segal – additional backing vocals
- Maime Hladiy – bass
- Mads Nilsson – mixing
- Dave Emery – mixing assistant
- Geoff Pesche – mastering

== Charts ==
=== Weekly charts ===
Chart (2010)	Peak position
Australia (ARIA)	69
Austria (Ö3 Austria Top 40)	61
Belgium (Ultratip Bubbling Under Flanders)	5
Belgium (Ultratip Bubbling Under Wallonia)	6
Brazil (Billboard Hot 100)	16
Brazil (Billboard Hot Pop Songs)	1
Canada (Canadian Digital Songs)	67
CIS Airplay (TopHit)	105
Croatia International Airplay (Top lista)	4
Czech Republic Airplay (ČNS IFPI)	50
Denmark Airplay (Tracklisten)	12
European Hot 100 Singles (Billboard)	25
France (SNEP)	29
Germany (GfK)	41
Global Dance Tracks (Billboard)	19
Hungary (Editors' Choice Top 40)	37
Ireland (IRMA)	33
Japan Hot 100 (Billboard)	57
Mexico Ingles Airplay (Billboard)	10
New Zealand Airplay (Recorded Music NZ)	69
Russia Airplay (TopHit)	116
Scottish Singles Sales (Official Charts)	11
Slovakia Airplay (ČNS IFPI)	18
Spain (Promusicae)	11
Switzerland (Schweizer Hitparade)	61
Ukraine Airplay (TopHit)	119
UK Singles (Official Charts)	12
US Dance Club Songs (Billboard)	1
US Dance/Electronic Digital Songs (Billboard)	12
US Dance/Mix Show Airplay (Billboard)	17

=== Year-end chart ===
Chart (2010)	Position
Croatia (HRT)	48
US Hot Dance Club Songs (Billboard)	28

== Certifications ==
Certifications and sales for "Get Outta My Way"
Region	Certification	Certified units/sales
United Kingdom (BPI)	Silver	200,000^{‡}
^{‡} Sales+streaming figures based on certification alone.
