= The One (Kylie Minogue song) =

2008 single by Kylie Minogue

Single by Kylie Minogue

from the album X
- Released: 28 July 2008
- Genre: Europop; electronica; electropop; synth-pop
- Length: 4:05 (album version); 3:36 (edit); 3:42 (remix)
- Label: Warner Music Australia; Parlophone
- Songwriters: Kylie Minogue; Richard "Biff" Stannard; James Wiltshire; Russell Small; John Andersson; Johan Emmoth; Emma Holmgren
- Producers: Richard "Biff" Stannard; Freemasons

Kylie Minogue singles chronology
"All I See" (2008)	"The One" (2008)	"Lhuna" (2008)

Music video
- "The One" on YouTube

"The One" is a song by Australian singer Kylie Minogue from her 10th studio album, X (2007). It was written by Minogue, Richard Stannard, James Wiltshire, Russell Small, John Andersson, Johan Emmoth and Emma Holmgren, while production was handled by Stannard and Freemasons. The song was released as the fifth and final single from X on 28 July 2008 by Warner Music Australia and Parlophone.

"The One" was originally performed by dance music group Laid and Emma Holmgren, but decided to give it to Minogue. For "The One", there are two official composition mixes. The album edit is a midtempo synthpop song, while the single remix is a more upbeat dance-pop song. Freemasons decided to remix the original song for single release. Lyrically, the song is directed at a lover, telling him that she is the one and wanting him to love her.

Commercially, the song was not successful in the music charts, due to very limited promotion. The song only reached the top of the airplay chart in New Zealand and peaked at number 10 on the dance chart in Australia. In Europe, the song managed to chart inside the top 10 in Slovakia, and reached number 36 in the United Kingdom. The song has featured in several concerts since its release, most recently being performed on Minogue's 2025 Tension Tour.

== Background ==
"The One" was officially announced as the fourth and last official single from Minogue's tenth studio album X (2007). "The One" was originally performed by dance music group Laid and Emma Holmgren, but they eventually gave it to Minogue to record. Their version managed to appear on the dance compilation Mastercuts: Funky House in 2006. The song was recorded and produced in Brighton, England where they came with other songs with other producers, one being "In My Arms". Minogue's version, however, features new verses than the original recorded.

In an interview with Russell Small, a producer of the album, on UK TV station Channel 4, he revealed that the album had suffered a delay. The main reason why was that when they sent "The One" to Stannard, they did not receive it back and waited for a total of 10 months. He explained; "We co-produced a track for her new album called 'The One' with a guy called Biff Stannard who writes for Spice Girls and has a couple of other tracks on the Kylie album. We sent the track away a year ago and didn't hear anything for about ten months, by which point we were trying to pull it back because we wanted it on our own record, but the day before we finalized our album we found out it had been accepted out of the hundreds of tracks submitted for Kylie." It was later announced that "The One" would be the last single from the album.

== Composition ==
"The One"
A sample of the song, in which Minogue sings the chorus. The song is an electropop song which is the album version.

After its completion, "The One" was mastered by Geoff Pesche and mixed by Ash Howes. The song was recorded in a studio, which was set up in Brighton, England, where other songs (including "In My Arms") were recorded. Musically, the album version is a synth-pop, Europop, electronica and electropop-influenced song. However, the remix version of the song is a more uptempo dance-pop song. According to the music sheet at MusicNotes.com, which was published by Sony/ATV Music Publishing, the song is written in the key of D major. The song's beat is set in common time, and moves at a tempo of 123 beats per minute. Minogue's vocals span from the note of F♯3 to the note of D5.

Fraser McAlpine from BBC Music said that Minogue has "[the] usual sensual vocals, big synths rushing in on the chorus to accelerate the begging "love me, love me, love me" lyric." He then commented about the single edit by saying "They [Freemasons] manage to actually slot quite nicely into this song, though; although there's a substantial difference between the original and this (namely, some big hairy synths and a rave beat) the original is strong enough to stand its ground without drowning under the Freemasons' treatment." Jax Spike from About.com felt the song was a ballad and compared the song to her 2004 single "I Believe in You". Tom Ewing from Pitchfork Media said "When that track ends and 'The One' shimmers gloriously in with New Order guitars and morse-code synths, the return to 4/4 dance-pop brings an almost tangible inrush of confidence. "I'm the One-- love me love me love me," she sings, and for these four minutes she is and we do."

Lyrically, the song deals with a female (Minogue) telling her lover that she is "the one", and wanting him to love her, chanting the lyric "Love me/Love me/Love me/Love me". Minogue also references the Italian sculptor Michelangelo with the line "Close to touch like Michelangelo."

== Music video ==
Minogue in the kaleidoscopic art deco inspired video for "The One"

The accompanying music video was directed by Ben Ib and filmed in Manchester, UK. The video was shot in a makeshift green screen studio in the Manchester Arena, where Minogue was then touring her KylieX2008 concerts, during a day off in between performance dates. The video premiered in August 2008 and uses the Freemasons' edit of the song.

The visual concept was inspired by various initial reference images which Minogue shared with Ib, which included the works of Man Ray and Alexander Rodchenko, as well as images of classical Hollywood actresses Carole Lombard and Lauren Bacall. According to Ib, the video is also influenced by Fritz Lang, Art Deco, Powell and Pressburger, The Wizard of Oz, and Busby Berkeley.

The video begins with a male dancer and female dancer (Jason Beitel and Nikki Trow) on their knees wearing swimsuits, enacting tightly choreographed arm movements while a kaleidoscopic effect of lights is in the background, often as produced by a spirograph. Minogue appears styled in several different looks in scenes cut together throughout the video, each depicted in black and white, against a backdrop of graphics which feature bursts of colour in kaleidoscopic and spiral visual motifs. At several interludes the graphic text "LOVE ME LOVE ME" appears in the video's background, timed with the accompanying lyrics of the chorus. Minogue first appears dressed in glamorous outfits redolent of the Hollywood Golden Age, and her hair is tightly curled, while towards the end she is seen wearing Ray-Ban Wayfarer sunglasses with a short bob haircut.

== Reception ==
=== Critical response ===
Fraser McAlpine from BBC Music acclaimed it in his review, awarding it five out of five. Though he gave the tracks individual reviews, he concluded about "The One"; "I've waxed lyrical about how seductively friendly Kylie is, vocally, before and there's nothing so utterly extraordinary about this song, musically, that it really needs a total breakdown to be reviewed and perhaps that means its generic, rather than genius but if Kylie can sell this where Róisín Murphy and (to some extent) Cyndi Lauper are failing, then it's far from a bad thing." Michael Hubbard from MusicOMH declared the song the most memorable song of the album X. He compared the song to New Order and Goldfrapp, but stated it "ultimately fails to lift off." Lost at Sea magazine also felt that she paid "homage to New Order."

Jax Spike from About.com said that the song isn't bad, but he did say the song failed to add anything "new to the table in the progression of the album." However, Jason Shawhan from the same website ranked the song at 12 for his "Song of the Year" chart. Tom Ewing from Pitchfork Media had declared "This kind of unfussy, hook-first music is what Minogue has always been best at, and back in her comfort zone she thrives." Giving the song four out of five stars, Nick Levine from Digital Spy wrote: "This glittery, shimmering techno-pop beauty suits Minogue perfectly, and she responds by investing it with one of her better vocal performances, managing to sound angelic and lusty at exactly the same time. It won't be enough to save X, but 'The One' is a neat reminder that almost nobody beats Kylie when she's on top form."

Peter Robinson from The Observer gave it an acclaimed remark by calling it "a sad disco epic" and said the song is ranked for being one of her best songs ever in her career. The Boston Globe called it an "icy dance-pop anthem." Chris True from Allmusic called the song a "cold, calculated dance-pop that is more indicative of her recent work". BBC Music said "though even that is topped by "The One", which follows in her fine tradition of making songs capable of both breaking your heart and shaking your rump." Evan Sawdey from PopMatters suggested the song would have been good back in her Stock Aitken Waterman days, but said "which, it should be noted, is not a good thing." Dave Hughes from Slant Magazine said along with "Stars"; "[although the songs] don't break a lot of new ground for Minogue, at least she sounds comfortable on them."

=== Chart performance ===
Although the song was released in her native Australia, it failed to make an impact on the Australian Singles Chart. However, the song did peak at number 10 on the ARIA Dance Charts. In the United Kingdom, the song debuted at number 36 but fell out after just three weeks in the chart. This was due to the cancellation of the physical release of the song, as it was primarily served as a digital download. After its failure in the UK, it was released in Europe. Although the song was released in New Zealand, it failed to make an impact on the New Zealand Singles Chart. However, it did chart on the New Zealand Airplay Chart, where it debuted at number two. The song then rose to number one, becoming Minogue's first number one on the radio chart, and her second overall in New Zealand.

In Belgium, the song debuted at number 30 on the Ultratip chart in Flanders. The song eventually rose to its peak of number seven. In Wallonia, the song debuted at number 26 on the Ultratip chart and peaked at number 15. In the Czech Republic, the song debuted and peaked at number 38 for two consecutive weeks. In Hungary, the song peaked at number 26. In Slovakia, the song debuted at number 94. During its 10th week, it rose into the top 20 until peaking at number six, staying on the chart for 25 weeks.

== Formats and track listings ==
International digital single
1. "The One" (edit) – 3:36

UK digital single – 7digital exclusive

1. "The One" (Freemasons Vocal Club Mix Edit) – 3:42

International 2-track digital single

1. "The One" – 4:05
2. "The One" (Freemasons Vocal Club Mix) – 9:15

UK 2-track digital single – 7digital exclusive

1. "The One" (edit) – 3:36
2. "The One" (Freemasons Vocal Club Mix) – 9:15

Australian and New Zealand digital EP

1. "The One" – 4:05
2. "The One" (Freemasons Vocal Club Mix Edit) – 3:42
3. "The One" (Freemasons Vocal Club Mix) – 9:15

== Charts ==
=== Weekly charts ===
Weekly chart performance for "The One"
Chart (2008)	Peak position
Belgium (Ultratip Bubbling Under Flanders)	7
Belgium (Ultratip Bubbling Under Wallonia)	15
CIS Airplay (TopHit)	61
Czech Republic Airplay (ČNS IFPI)	38
Hungary (Rádiós Top 40)	26
New Zealand Airplay (RIANZ)	1
Russia Airplay (TopHit)	51
Slovakia Airplay (ČNS IFPI)	6
UK Singles (Official Charts)	36

=== Year-end charts ===
Year-end chart performance for "The One"
Chart (2008)	Position
Russia Airplay (TopHit)	195

== Release history ==
Release dates and formats for "The One"
Region	Date	Format(s)	Label(s)	Ref.
United Kingdom	28 July 2008	Digital download	Parlophone	
Australia	20 September 2008	Digital download (EP)	Warner Music Australia	
