= Wow (Kylie Minogue song) =

2008 single by Kylie Minogue

- European cover art

Single by Kylie Minogue

from the album X
- B-side: "Cherry Bomb"; "Do It Again"; "Carried Away"
- Released: 14 January 2008
- Recorded: August 2007
- Studio: Magnetic (Ibiza); Echo (Los Angeles)
- Genre: Disco; dance-pop; bubblegum pop
- Length: 3:13
- Label: Parlophone
- Songwriters: Kylie Minogue; Greg Kurstin; Karen Poole
- Producer: Greg Kurstin

Kylie Minogue singles chronology
"2 Hearts" (2007)	"Wow" (2008)	"In My Arms" (2008)

Audio sample
- file; help

Music video
- "Wow" on YouTube

"Wow" is a song recorded by Australian singer Kylie Minogue for her tenth studio album, X (2007). It was written by Minogue, Greg Kurstin and Karen Poole, while production was handled by Kurstin. The song was released as the second (Note: "Wow" was released as the second single from X in Oceania and the UK, and later as the third across mainland Europe, following "In My Arms".) single from X on 14 January 2008, by Parlophone. "Wow" features instrumentation from guitars, electronic synthesizers, keyboards and drum machines, along with pianos through some verses. The song is set in a disco-oriented beat with many other electronic elements.

Upon the song's release, it received positive reviews from contemporary music critics, who praised the production and complimented its catchiness; they commented positively on its release as a single. The song peaked inside the top 20 on the US Hot Dance Airplay chart, as well as charting inside the top twenty in countries including her native Australia, United Kingdom, Ireland, France, New Zealand and Hungary. A music video for "Wow" was directed by Melina Matsoukas and filmed in Los Angeles, California along with the video for "In My Arms" in early January 2008.

== Background and recording ==
"Wow" was composed and written by Greg Kurstin, Minogue and Karen Ann Poole. Minogue requested setting up a studio in Ibiza with previous writing partner Karen Poole and newcomer to the fold Greg Kurstin, an American multi-instrumentalist musician and producer, during the summer of 2007. The song is written the key of D Major. Minogue's vocal range spans from the key note of F#3 to the key note of E5. Additionally, the song is set in common time and has a tempo of 124 beats per minute. Lyrically, the song talks about someone who stands out, with the title referring them as "Wow".

Originally, it was said that they wanted "Wow" or "Like a Drug" as the first single, but ultimately "2 Hearts" was released as the lead. Minogue intended the track to be the US lead single from the album, but it was withdrawn and "All I See" was released instead in an attempt to appeal to a more urban market. "All I See" ultimately failed to enter mainstream charts in the US. Following this, "Wow" was released as Minogue's first club single in North America. In Australia, "Wow" was officially sent to radio on 14 January 2008. Three new additional tracks were featured on the CD single, these being "Cherry Bomb", "Do It Again" and "Carried Away", which were recorded during the album sessions.

== Critical reception ==
"Wow" received mainly positive reviews from contemporary music critics. The Boston Globe had compared "Wow" with American singer Madonna's 1983 single "Holiday", but added "Wow" is "Holiday" on studio steroids". Kelefa Sanneh from The New York Times had said that "Wow"; "updates 80s-era Madonna". Evan Sawdey MusicOMH gave it a very positive review, as he compared the songs to Minogue's previous songs "Shocked", "Too Far", "Come into My World" and "The Loco-Motion", saying in his extended review; "it’s jam-packed with peppy melody, built around a simple, addictive piano melody that is soon shot into the pop stratosphere." He also said that the song is a "great track". Dave Hughes from Slant Magazine gave it a positive review, saying ""Wow" is a pretty great summation of the commercially successful aspects of Minogue's career to date—a hyperactive juvenile disco track full of fun, big-budget whooshes and drops, something utterly disposable that she sells without shame." They also highlighted the song as an album standout.

However, Alex Fletcher of Digital Spy wrote that "Wow" "doesn't have the 'oomph' factor to make us fall for her like we have in the past", but the song's "disco swirls and whooshing synths are great fun". In a review for The Guardian, Alexis Petridis called the song "fantastic" and compared it to Minogue's songs with Stock, Aitken and Waterman. Pitchfork Media reviewer Tom Ewing wrote that the song's "excitement is infectious" even though its "funked-up electro sexiness may feel contrived". In his book The Blue in the Air (2011), Marcello Carlin praises the song's "central motif of processed-mouths-as-muted-plunger-trombone-section".

== Chart performance ==
"Wow" debuted on the UK Singles Chart at number 32 on 24 December 2007, based solely on digital download sales. Ten weeks later, the song reached number five. In February 2008, the song topped the UK Upfront Club Chart. This eventually became Minogue's best selling single in the UK since 2002's "Love at First Sight". As of 2022, “Wow” has accrued 268,132 sales in the UK, according to the Official Charts Company. The song was also successful in France, where the song debuted at number 15, and stayed in the French Singles Chart for 22 weeks in total. The song also charted elsewhere in Europe, where it peaked at number 33 on the Austrian Singles Chart, number 51 on the Swiss Singles Chart and number 41 on the German Singles Chart.

In Minogue's native Australia, the song debuted at number 11 where it peaked, and remained on the singles chart for eight weeks. In New Zealand, the song debuted at number 17 on 24 February 2008. Following radio airplay, it later rose to number 16 on 9 March 2008. It debuted at number 34 on the Swedish Singles Chart, until rising to number 32, where it peaked, and stayed in the charts for five weeks. In the Romania, "Wow" debuted at number 63 in February, finally peaking at number 42 in June, becoming her first song ever to miss the top 20. In the United States, the song was released to American dance radio-stations and became a moderate success when it debuted within the Top 40 of the Billboard Hot Dance Airplay chart, eventually peaking at number 19. The song also peaked at number 16 and 17 on the Euro Digital Tracks and Euro Digital Songs charts, respectively.

== Music video ==
A music video for "Wow" was directed by Melina Matsoukas and filmed in Los Angeles, California along with the video for "In My Arms" in early January 2008. The video features Minogue in dancing in a futuristic nightclub surrounded by dancers in alien outfits. The video begins with Minogue's silhouette dancing against a lighted background. She is then shown in a white tracksuit surrounded by a group of dancers. Scenes of Minogue and her dancers dancing in front of a lighted background are intercut throughout the video.

PerezHilton.com hosted the world premiere the music video on 29 January 2008. It was scheduled to premiere on Channel 4 in the United Kingdom on 30 January 2008, but was postponed. Media regulator Ofcom removed the video after they found it did not follow viewer guidelines due to the use of strobe lighting. The video was re-edited and broadcast in the United Kingdom the following week.

== Live performances ==
The song has been performed on all of Minogue's concert tours since it was released (with the exception of the Anti Tour), with it most recently performed at her 2018 Golden Tour. Along with the promotion on her tours, the song has been featured in many media productions. It has been used as background music in Desperate Housewives, performed at her TV special The Kylie Show and was included on the soundtrack of the film Beverly Hills Chihuahua.

"Wow" was also performed on:

- The Kylie Show
- 2008 BRIT Awards
- The X Factor season 4
- BBC Proms in the Park 2012 (orchestral version of the song)

== Formats and track listings ==
UK 2-track CD single

1. "Wow" – 3:13
2. "Cherry Bomb" – 4:16

European 2-track CD single and digital download 1

1. "Wow" – 3:13
2. "Can't Get You Out of My Head" (Greg Kurstin Remix) – 4:05

Australian and UK CD maxi-single

1. "Wow" – 3:13
2. "Do It Again" – 3:21
3. "Carried Away" – 3:14
4. "Wow" (Death Metal Disco Scene Mix) – 6:27

European CD maxi-single

1. "Wow" – 3:13
2. "Wow" (Death Metal Disco Scene Mix) – 6:27
3. "Wow" (CSS Mix) – 3:14
4. "Wow" (Video)

UK 12-inch picture disc

1. "Wow" – 3:13
2. "Wow" (CSS Mix) – 3:14
3. "Wow" (F*** Me I'm Famous Remix by David Guetta & Joachim Garraud) – 6:22
4. "Wow" (MSTRKRFT Remix) – 4:45

Australian and UK digital download 1

1. "Wow" (Radio Edit) – 3:13
2. "Do It Again" – 3:21
3. "Carried Away" – 3:14
4. "Cherry Bomb" – 4:16

Australian and UK digital download 2

1. "Wow" (Radio Edit) – 3:13
2. "Wow" (CSS Mix) – 3:14
3. "Wow" (MSTRKRFT Remix) – 4:45
4. "Wow" (F*** Me I'm Famous Remix by David Guetta & Joachim Garraud) – 6:22
5. "Wow" (Death Metal Disco Scene Mix) – 6:27

Australian digital download 3

1. "Wow" – 3:13
2. "2 Hearts" (Mark Brown's Pacha Ibiza Upper Terrace Mix) – 7:02

UK digital download 3

1. "Wow" (Radio Edit) – 3:13
2. "2 Hearts" (Mark Brown's Pacha Ibiza Upper Terrace Mix) – 7:02

UK digital download 4 - iTunes exclusive

1. "Wow" (Radio Edit) – 3:13
2. "2 Hearts" (Mark Brown's Pacha Ibiza Upper Terrace Mix) – 7:02
3. "Wow" (Video) - 3:13

European digital download 2

1. "Wow" – 3:13
2. "Wow" (Death Metal Disco Scene Mix – 6:27
3. "Wow" (CSS Mix) – 3:14
4. "Wow" (MSTRKRFT Remix) – 4:45

== Personnel ==
The following people contributed to "Wow":

- Kylie Minogue – lead vocals
- Greg Kurstin - production, all instruments, mixing
- Karen Poole — backing vocals, vocal production
- Eddie Miller - additional engineering
- Geoff Pesche - mastering
- Recorded at Magnetic Studios in Ibiza and Echo Studios in Los Angeles

== Charts ==
=== Weekly charts ===
Weekly chart performance for "Wow"
Chart (2008)	Peak position
Australia (ARIA)	11
Austria (Ö3 Austria Top 40)	73
Belgium (Ultratop 50 Flanders)	37
Belgium (Ultratip Bubbling Under Wallonia)	2
Belgium Dance (Ultratop Flanders)	8
CIS Airplay (TopHit)	120
Denmark Airplay (Tracklisten)	20
European Hot 100 Singles (Billboard)	18
Finland (Suomen virallinen lista)	29
France (SNEP)	15
Germany (GfK)	41
Global Dance Tracks (Billboard)	21
Hungary (Rádiós Top 40)	19
Ireland (IRMA)	10
Netherlands (Dutch Top 40)	15
Netherlands (Single Top 100)	36
New Zealand Airplay (Recorded Music NZ)	16
Scottish Singles Sales (Official Charts)	2
Slovakia Airplay (ČNS IFPI)	19
Sweden (Sverigetopplistan)	32
Switzerland (Schweizer Hitparade)	51
UK Singles (Official Charts)	5
US Dance Airplay (Billboard)	19

=== Year-end charts ===
Year-end chart performance for "Wow"
Chart (2008)	Position
European Hot 100 Singles (Billboard)	100
Hungary (Rádiós Top 40)	72
UK Singles (OCC)	64

== Certifications ==
Certifications and sales for "Wow"
Region	Certification	Certified units/sales
France	—	11,860
United Kingdom (BPI)	Silver	200,000^{^}
^{^} Shipments figures based on certification alone.

== Release history ==
Release dates and formats for "Wow"
Region	Date	Format(s)	Label(s)	Ref.
Australia	14 January 2008	Radio airplay	Warner Music Australia	
Australia	16 February 2008	Digital download (EP)	Warner Music Australia	
United Kingdom	16 February 2008	Digital download (EP)	Parlophone	
Australia	18 February 2008	Maxi CD	Warner Music Australia	
United Kingdom	25 February 2008	12-inch vinyl; CD; maxi CD	Parlophone	
France	9 June 2008	CD	Capitol	
Germany	4 July 2008	Maxi CD	EMI	
