= X (Kylie Minogue album) =

2007 album by Kylie Minogue

Studio album by Kylie Minogue
- Released: 21 November 2007
- Recorded: July 2006–August 2007
- Studios: Jonas Jeberg's studio (Copenhagen); Magnetic (Ibiza); EMI Publishing (London); Metropolis (London); Olympic (London); Sleeper (London); Stanley House (London); Echo (Los Angeles); Murlyn (Stockholm)
- Genres: Dance-pop; electropop; electronica; electroclash
- Length: 45:12
- Label: Parlophone
- Producers: Bloodshy & Avant; Guy Chambers; Cutfather; Cathy Dennis; Freemasons; Calvin Harris; Jonas Jeberg; Kish Mauve; Greg Kurstin; Karen Poole; Matt Prisne; Richard "Biff" Stannard; Eg White

Kylie Minogue chronology
Confide in Me: The Irresistible Kylie (2007)	X (2007)	Boombox (2008)

Singles from X
- 1. "2 Hearts" Released: 10 October 2007; 2. "Wow" Released: 14 January 2008; 3. "In My Arms" Released: 13 February 2008; 4. "All I See" Released: 11 March 2008; 5. "The One" Released: 28 July 2008

X is the tenth studio album by Australian singer Kylie Minogue. EMI Music Japan released it first in Japan on 21 November 2007, before its release in Australia by Warner Music Australia two days later. The album was released in the United Kingdom by Parlophone on 26 November 2007, and in the United States by Capitol and Astralwerks on 1 April 2008. Work on the album began in July 2006, following Minogue's gradual recovery from breast cancer. After finishing Showgirl: Homecoming Tour in early 2007, she returned to the studio to complete the album, with the help from many producers including Bloodshy & Avant, Calvin Harris, Greg Kurstin, and Freemasons.

X is a dance-pop and electronica album that explore themes of sex and celebration. Music critics praised the production but were ambivalent towards its consistency and lyrical content. Minogue garnered several nominations for X, including Brit Award for Best International Album and Grammy Award for Best Dance/Electronic Album. Commercially, X debuted at number one on the Australian Albums Chart and peaked at number four on the UK Albums Chart. The album reached the top 20 in other countries, including Austria, Germany, Ireland, France, Scotland, and Switzerland.

Five singles were released from X. The lead single, "2 Hearts", peaked inside the top 10 in several countries, including Australia, Spain, and the United Kingdom. "Wow" was released in Australia and the UK, while "In My Arms" was issued in Europe. "All I See" and "The One" were released as digital singles: the former to promote the album in the United States and the latter in Europe. Minogue promoted X by performing in the US during March and May 2008, and with the KylieX2008 concert tour, which saw her perform around Europe, Oceania, South America, and Asia. The album has sold over 1.4 million copies worldwide.

== Background and development ==
In 2004, Kylie Minogue released her second major greatest hits album, Ultimate Kylie. The album peaked within the top 10 and reached multi-platinum status in the UK, Ireland, and Australia. In May 2005, while promoting Ultimate Kylie with the Showgirl: The Greatest Hits Tour, Minogue was diagnosed with breast cancer. She canceled the remaining concert dates and underwent immediate treatment: she had a partial mastectomy to remove a lump from her left breast and spent the next six months receiving chemotherapy. Her hospitalization and treatment in Melbourne garnered intense media coverage. Following her recovery, Minogue worried about not having sung in some time and whether she could return to performing so soon after her treatment. The resumption of the tour was first announced in June 2006. The rescheduled tour, renamed Showgirl: Homecoming Tour, began in November and travelled to Australia and England.

In July of the same year, Australian concert promoter Michael Gudinski revealed Minogue was in the studio recording new material. She recalled feeling happy to be back in the studio and not under pressure to record an album. At the start of the tour in November, Minogue said she was recording new tracks, and felt more inspired than she had for a long period of time. Once the tour ended in January 2007, she returned to the studio to complete the album, feeling that finalizing it was a personal goal she had set. "I had to go back to the studio just to test myself and to get something off my chest, which I did", Minogue recalled. X was the first album Minogue had consciously prepared for the recording process—she had been engaged in a cycle of record, release, and tour for much of her career. The production took a year and a half to finish, with more than 40 songs recorded. Finishing with X was a great relief to Minogue, who felt she was ready for more.

== Writing and recording ==
Towards the end of her cancer treatment in mid-2006, Minogue began writing in Melbourne, including the lyrics that would later form the basis of "Cosmic" and "No More Rain". She wrote lyrics about her experience during her recovery from breast cancer to a disco beat. Jake Shears and Babydaddy of Scissor Sisters, co-writers of "I Believe in You", joined Minogue at recording sessions in New York. They did several demos together, resulting in "White Diamond". The track did not appear in the final tracklist, but Minogue later chose it to perform in the Showgirl: The Homecoming Tour and included the song in the documentary of the same name. London group Kish Mauve re-produced two of their own songs for Minogue, "Lose Control" and "2 Hearts". Minogue loved "2 Hearts" the first time she heard it and did several takes on the verses to make it sound more effortless and lazier. Danish producers Cutfather and Jonas Jeberg forwarded a demo of "Like a Drug" to Parlophone and later flew to London to record the track with Minogue within a day. While there, they also recorded "All I See" and "Rippin' Up the Disco". "All I See" was co-written by Edwin "Lil' Eddie" Serrano, whose vocals on the demo were used on the final version.

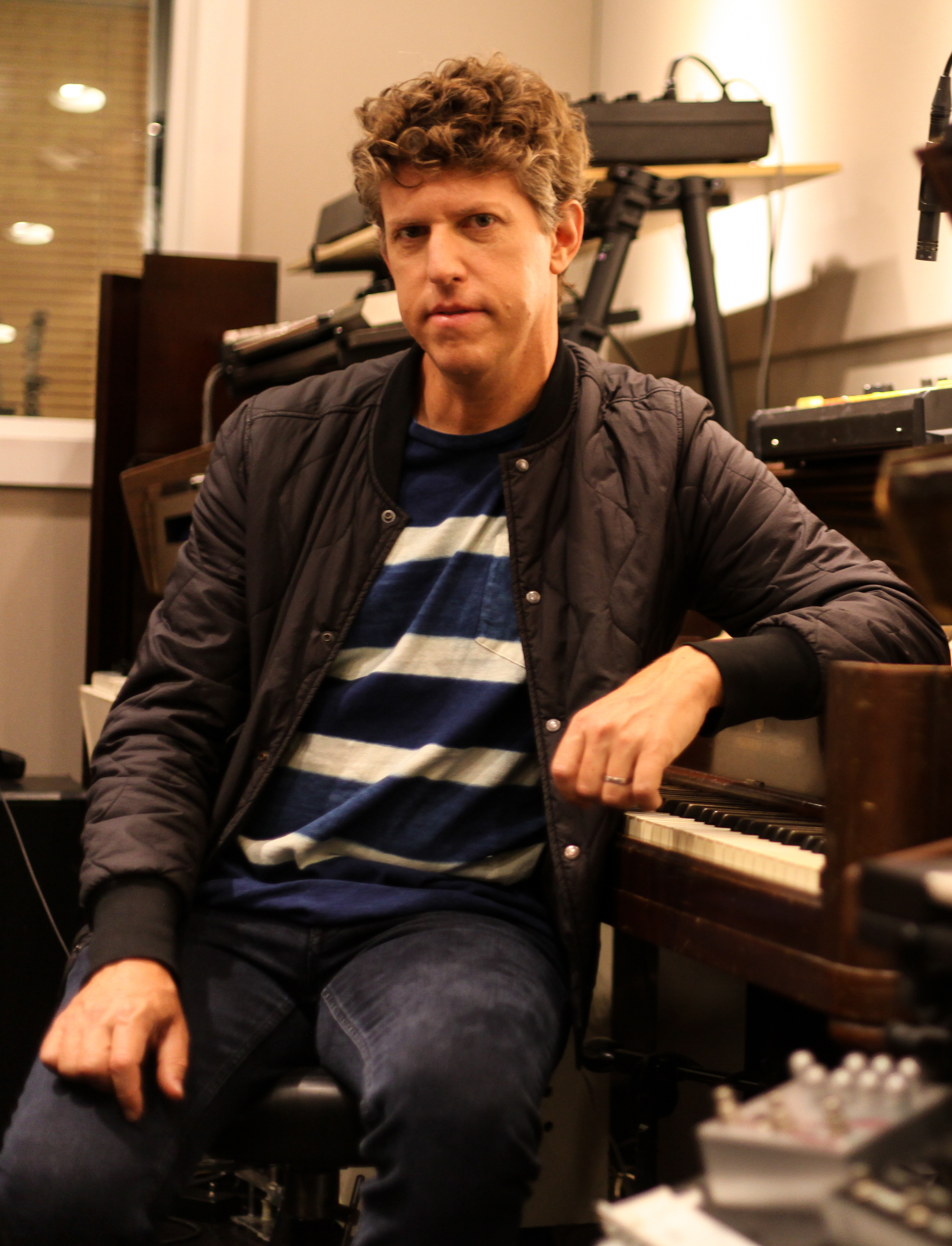
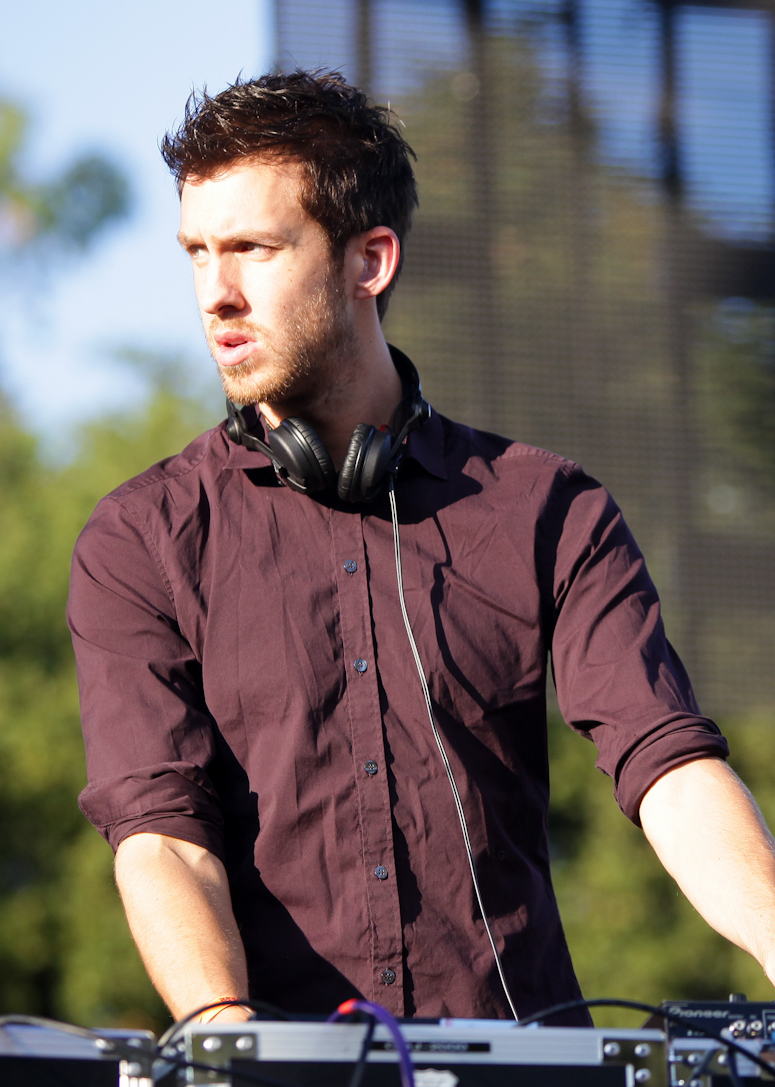
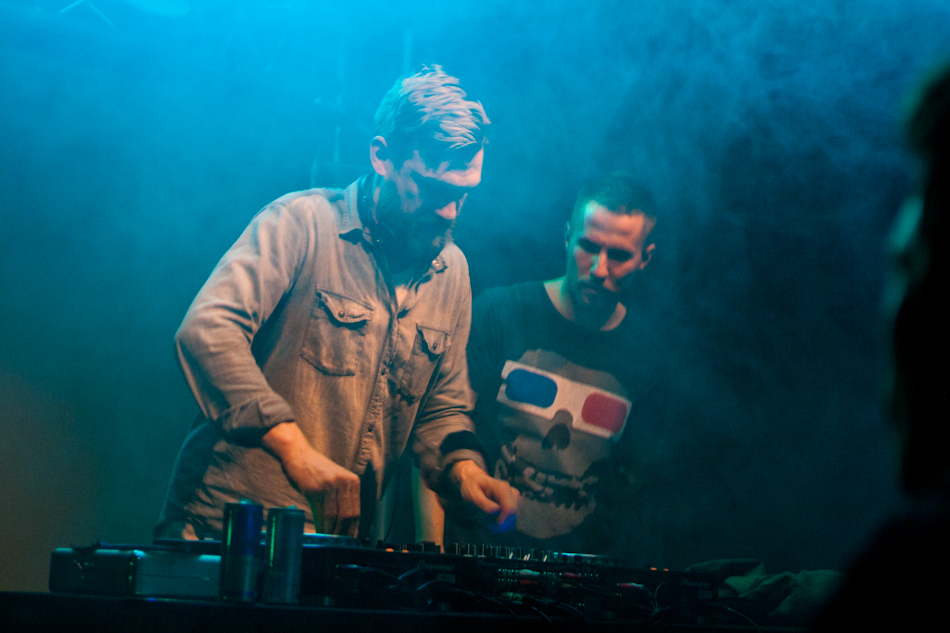
X features contributions from producers Greg Kurstin, Calvin Harris, and Bloodshy & Avant (clockwise).

Songwriter Guy Chambers, whom Minogue met at a social event in 2006, offered her a song he had written over four years before. The track is built around a sample of Serge Gainsbourg and Brigitte Bardot's "Bonnie and Clyde" (1968). Cathy Dennis joined Minogue working on the track, which became "Sensitized". Minogue also completed "Cosmic" with producer Eg White. Minogue collaborated with her longstanding co-writers team Biffco, including Richard Stannard, Julian Peake, and Paul Harris. Together they wrote "Stars" and "I Don't Know What It Is" (with Rob Davis) in Brighton. Stannard also co-produced "The One" with Russell Small and James Wiltshire, better known as the English duo Freemasons. Music group Laid and Emma Holmgren originally recorded "The One", but they eventually gave the song to Minogue. In April 2007, Scottish producer Calvin Harris was announced as a producer working on X. He was introduced to Minogue through her A&R executive Jamie Nelson. He ended up co-writing "In My Arms", "Stars" (both with Biffco), and "Heart Beat Rock" (with Karen Poole).

Sessions in Stockholm with songwriter Poole and Swedish producers Bloodshy & Avant resulted in the tracks "Speakerphone", "Cherry Bomb" and "Nu-di-ty". Minogue brought out her lyric book and attempted to work on "No More Rain" with the duo, but their production-heavy style did not work well with the song. Minogue had formed a friendship with her frequent co-writing partner Poole prior to the production. Minogue felt easy when co-writing songs with her because they shared the same vocal register. Feeling tired of recording in London, Minogue suggested going to Ibiza with Poole and American producer Greg Kurstin in August. They set up a studio booth in a villa and put the final touches on the album. They wrote "Wow" on the day they arrived in Ibiza; "King or Queen", "Carried Away", "Do It Again" and "Magnetic Electric" were also written and recorded during these same sessions. Minogue also gave "No More Rain" to Kurstin to complete a new production on the song.

Several tracks with other songwriters and producers were rejected during the production process. Minogue completed a few tracks with her longtime collaborator Steve Anderson—one of those is a track titled "Flower" that was later recorded for the orchestral album The Abbey Road Sessions (2012). Scottish musician Mylo was shocked when his recorded tracks with Minogue were scrapped, despite being told they were being sent off to be mixed and would be on the final record. Minogue was reportedly working with R&B producer Terry Riley, her longtime collaborator Stock Aitken Waterman and New York-based DJ Roger Sanchez, who says she is "moving in a different direction"; their work never materialised. Neil Tennant and Chris Lowe, better known as Pet Shop Boys, were invited to write a handful of tracks, which were apparently rejected. They ended up using some of the rejected ideas for their own 2009 album Yes. English band Hot Chip was asked to meet a "top-line songwriter" from Minogue's camp, but this never occurred as they were busy making Made in the Dark (2008). Nelly Furtado reportedly had a duet with Minogue for the album, but the song was never recorded. Further submissions came from Boy George, Amanda Ghost, Mark Ronson, Daft Punk, Alan Braxe, Groove Armada, Hannah Robinson, Siobhan Fahey, Goldfrapp, Dragonette, Sneaky Sound System, and Kiki Lesendrić.

== Musical styles ==
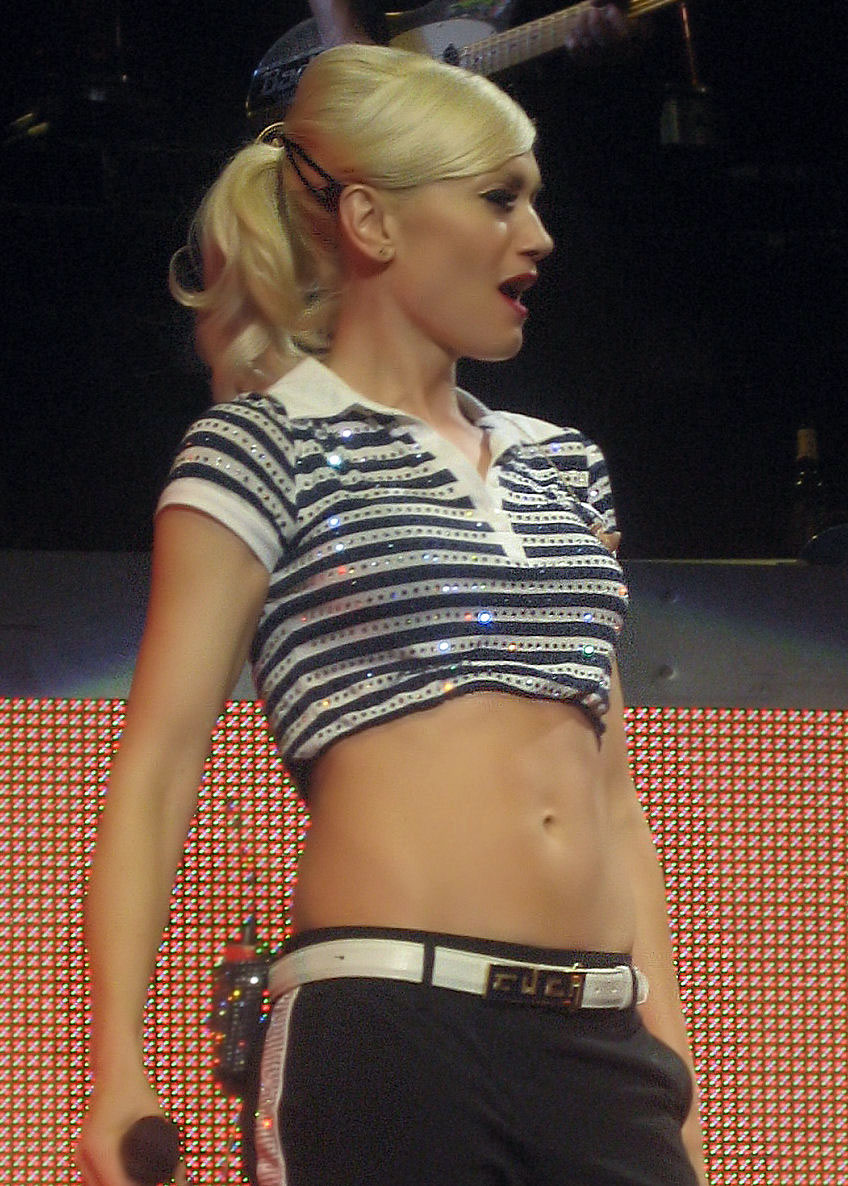
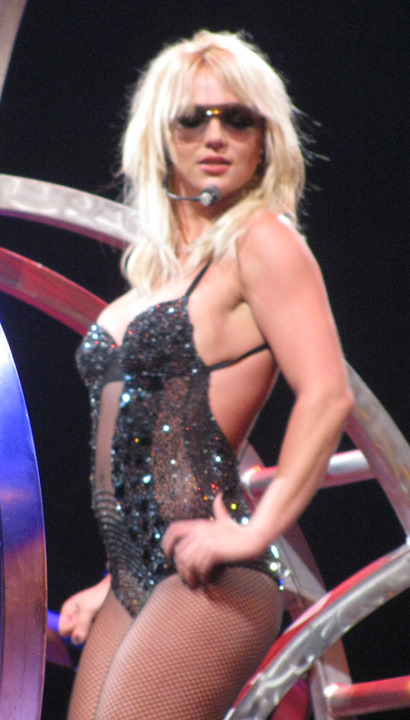
Minogue's musical direction and vocal delivery on X were compared to those of American singers Gwen Stefani (left, pictured in 2007) and Britney Spears (right, pictured in 2009).

X has been characterized as a dance-pop and electronica album that incorporates elements of electropop and pop rock. Chris True of AllMusic commented on the album's musical diversity, pointing out the mix of calculated dance-pop from Minogue's early 2000s releases and her personal work akin to Kylie Minogue (1994) and Impossible Princess (1997). BBC Music's Chris Long felt X captured the trend for electro music. Tom Ewing of Pitchfork called it an album that "hops around searching for a sound it's comfortable with" and felt Minogue was trying to have "the whole contemporary UK pop scene on a single CD". Sharon O'Connell of Yahoo! Music, Alexis Petridis of The Guardian and Ewing found the influences from other contemporary artists in the late 2000s, such as Daft Punk, Girls Aloud, Britney Spears, Gwen Stefani and Sugababes.

The album opens with "2 Hearts", a 1970s-style electro-rock, glam track. The song features heavy piano rolls, electric guitar, and chanting "whooo" towards the chorus. Music critics found its production was influenced by Goldfrapp, Roxy Music, PJ Harvey, Scissor Sisters, and Blondie. "Sensitized", another rock track, is built around the sample of Gainsbourg and Bardot's "Bonnie and Clyde". Ewing wrote the track swings harder than anything else on the album, while Spike commented it comes off like a diluted version of "Cowboy Style" (1997) with a slower pace. The 1980s-evoking disco-rock "Stars" features guitar riffs in the chorus.

The synth-pop "In My Arms" features a flimsy, nearly-punk production by Harris. Ewing felt his production works like "a cassette player version of Justice—all hiss and stickytape", while Ed Power of Hot Press called it a Giorgio Moroder update for the Generation Z. The track contains fuzzy synths, 'whooosh!' effects, clattering beats, and an intro where Minogue robotically wonders "How do you describe a feeling?". The stomping electro track "Like a Drug" has a sinister production, with a distorted airy vibe. Critics noted the similarities between the track and Visage's "Fade to Grey" (1980), and Mel & Kim's "Respectable" (1987). "Heart Beat Rock" has sing-a-long verses, stuttering beats, and frothy Neptunes' keyboards. Both Ewing and Bruce Scott of Prefix commented that "Heart Beat Rock" is better suited for Gwen Stefani, who embodied a more sassy and exciting tone. The electro-disco "Wow" opens with a jangling piano line, and contains an "ooh-wow-wow" refrain towards the chorus. It was compared to Madonna's "Holiday" (1983), the work of Stock Aitken and Waterman, and Daft Punk by music critics. "Nu-di-ty" is a funky electronic track that has influences from Timbaland, Spears, and Black Eyed Peas. Minogue speaks Japanese at the end of the track: "どういたしまして" ("You're welcome").

"Speakerphone" is a mellow and distorted electronic pop song that was compared to Daft Punk and Girls Aloud by critics. The multi-layer song is built around a tantalising harp tune. Hughes claimed "Speakerphone" flirts with hip hop elements, while Levine and Dan Weiss of Lost At Sea viewed the track as an extension of Spears' Blackout era. "The One" is an electro-disco track with morse-code synths and four on the floor beats. The track is reminiscent of the work of New Order, Stock Aitken Waterman, and Minogue's "I Believe in You". The cheery electro-pop "No More Rain" is similar to the work of Ace of Base, 90s-era Madonna, Pet Shop Boys, and Goldfrapp. The soulful R&B ballad "All I See" contains repetitive metronomic beats, strutting bassline, and a strummed-harp sample. The song includes an interpolation from The Gap Band's "Outstanding" (1982). "All I See" garnered frequent comparisons with the work of Janet Jackson. The sentimental "Cosmic" contains dreamy piano chords.

== Themes and vocals ==
Critics identified the themes of sex and celebration on X. Minogue described X as a sensual and feel-good pop collection that is "much more of a celebration" than her previous releases. Joan Anderman of The Boston Globe and Ewing highlighted the enthusiastic and celebratory nature throughout the record. About.com's Jax Spike viewed it is "an album meant for partying and having fun", while Petridis noted it relies heavily on the sexual and filled with double-entendres. Minogue exclaims "I'm in love" on the opening track, "2 Hearts". "The One" is a message to a lover, telling him she is the one and wanting him to love her. The track has a reference to Michelangelo's The Creation of Adam in the lyrics: "It's a feeling that I need to know / Close to touch like Michelangelo". Minogue references dancing and sex on "Wow", while telling her man to perform a striptease on "Nu-di-ty".

"Stars", "No More Rain" and "Cosmic" touch upon Minogue's experience following her cancer treatment. On "No More Rain", Minogue wonders about the universe and fantasises about her return to the performing stage. On "Stars", she contemplates the meaning of life, advises the listener not to let a chance of love slip away, and to find joy in everyday life. "Cosmic" has Minogue listing things she wants to do, including writing a song called "Cosmic" and speaking without the interruption. Minogue recalled writing these songs as a mantra for positivity, and a tribute for the support she received from the public during her recovery. Minogue refused to release an album full of material about her cancer treatment, thinking it would be seen as Impossible Princess 2 and be equally critiqued. Several critics commented on the decision to ignore her health struggle and her breakup with French actor Olivier Martinez on X. Evan Sawdey of PopMatters felt the album missed "a chance to say something deeply profound that would reach millions of people". He compared X to Sheryl Crow's Detours (2008), an album which explicitly addressed Crow's cancer struggle and her breakup with Lance Armstrong. O'Connell said Minogue "might well have fancied a bit of fashionable recorded exorcism" similar to Spears' Blackout.

Minogue's high-pitched and light tone of vocals on X attracted comments from several critics. Josh Love of The News & Observer thought her voice can match with the "chirpy buoyancy" of Stefani, Spears and Janet Jackson. O'Connell linked her delivery to the breathy suggestiveness of Marilyn Monroe and the trademark falsetto of André 3000. Critics also noted the hyper treatment of Minogue's voice, which is distorted and sliced-up on tracks like "Speakerphone" and "Nu-di-ty". Petridis and Hubbard felt her delivery through electronic effects was robotic and made her sounds less connected to the music. Sawdey, on the other hand, found Minogue engages the listener with her sex kitten persona despite her limited voice, and compared her robotic delivery on "Speakerphone" favourably to those of Spears during her Blackout (2007) album. Jody Rosen of Rolling Stone suggested she made the right choice to allow her vocals to be "processed and thoroughly T-Pained".

== Packaging and release ==
Minogue's frequent collaborator William Baker shot the album's artwork, while Adjective Noun designed it. The cover depicts Minogue with red lip-gloss in a punky and 1980s chic style. Christian Guiltenane of Classic Pop felt the airbrushed retro image was an homage to the Patrick Nagel illustration for Duran Duran's Rio (1982). Writing for Idolator, Mike Wass and Robbie Daw commented the cover artwork is stylish and flaw-free. The album's title, X, is a reference to Minogue's tenth studio album; X is the Roman numeral for the number 10. The original title of the album was Magnetic Electric, the title of a bonus track. Minogue changed the title to what her fans had been calling the album all along. She decided on the final track listing for X with longtime manager Terry Blamey. Minogue managed to save some of the rejected tracks for B-side releases. "Some may be held for later on but you never know when and where they will turn up – most of them are quite good", Minogue said.

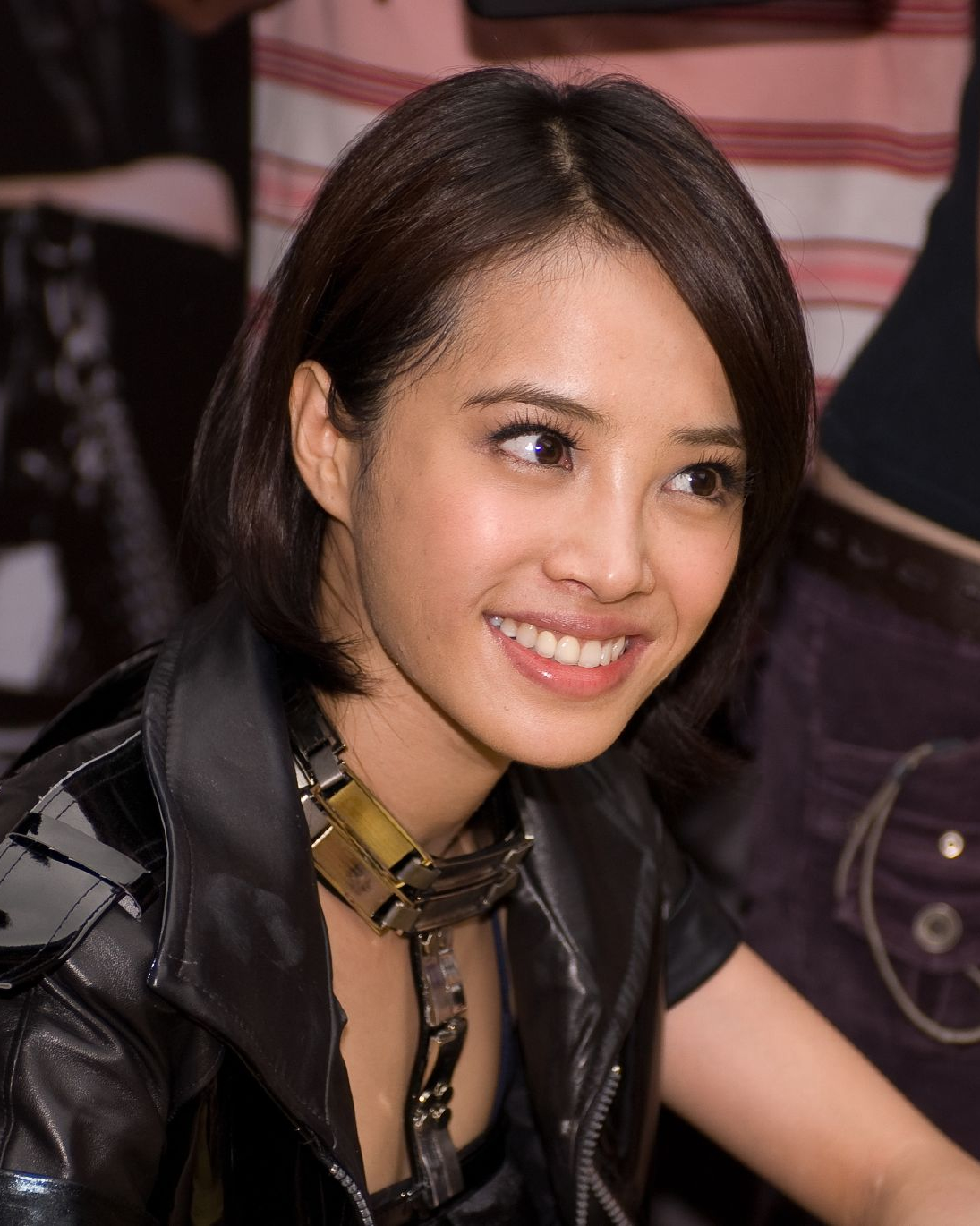
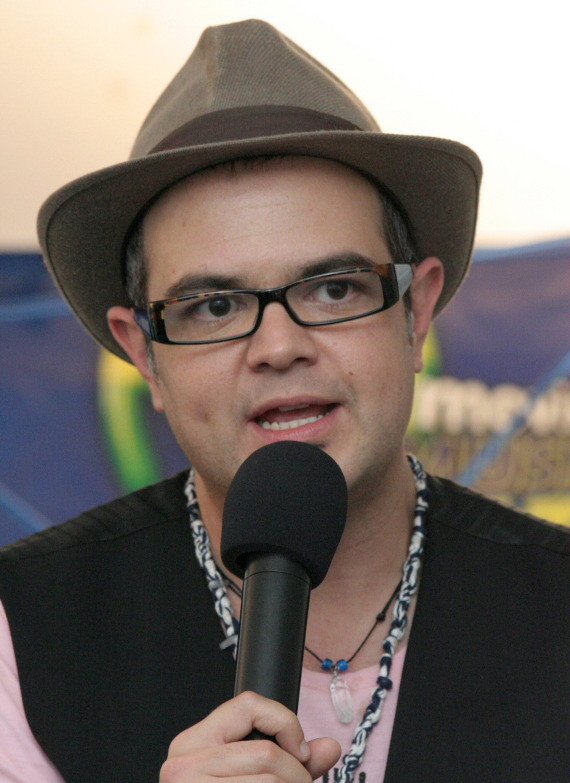
"In My Arms" was released as a duet between Minogue and Taiwanese singer Jolin Tsai (left, pictured in 2007) on the Asian edition of X, and Mexican singer-songwriter Aleks Syntek on the Mexican edition (right, pictured in 2008).

In March 2007, a track titled "Excuse My French" was leaked on the Internet; sources claimed it was to be Minogue's new single. Minogue later issued a statement on her official website denying recording the track. Two months later, ten new tracks by Minogue were leaked and uploaded to certain file-sharing sites, among them were "Stars" and "Sensitized". Despite being pulled by YouTube and some of the file-sharing sites, the leaked tracks had already been widely distributed through forums and blogs. After the release of X was announced with a confirmed tracklist on 21 September 2007, Mylo briefly posted two of his rejected tracks for the album on his official website and MySpace account. The MP3 files, titled "In The Mood For Love" and "Spell of Desire", went offline hours later. Minogue claimed the leaked tracks were demos and said: "I think any artist would be annoyed with that... Still, it was a lesson learnt."

EMI Music Japan first released the standard edition of X in Japan on 21 November 2007, with two bonus tracks: "King or Queen" and "I Don't Know What It Is". A special edition with a bonus DVD was also available, featuring an interview with Minogue, and the trailer for White Diamond. Two days later, Warner Music Australia distributed the album in Australia, while Parlophone and EMI released it in Europe. Two editions of the album were available, with a CD-ROM section on the standard edition containing access to the exclusive track "Rippin' Up The Disco". In the UK, X was released on 26 November, also with two editions. A limited USB edition was available in the UK and Canada, featuring a tiny animated doll of Minogue in the style of the release artwork.

"Magnetic Electric" and "White Diamond" were included on the Australian and New Zealand releases from the iTunes Store in 2007. Minogue recorded "In My Arms" as a duet with Taiwanese singer Jolin Tsai on the Asian edition of X (released in November 2007), and with Mexican singer-songwriter Aleks Syntek on the Mexican edition (released in June 2008). The Chinese edition replaces the solo version of "In My Arms" with the version featuring Tsai, while omitting the tracks "Like a Drug", "Speakerphone" and "Nu-di-ty" because of censorship. In the United States, Capitol and Astralwerks released X in April 2008 with two bonus tracks: the extended mix of "All I See" featuring rapper Mims and "Carried Away". Mexico released a special edition in 2008, which contains three bonus tracks: "Carried Away", "Cherry Bomb", and "Do It Again". A special tour edition package was released in southern Asia and Australia, featuring the track "Magnetic Electric", various remixes and bonus videos.

== Promotion ==
=== Live performances and tour ===
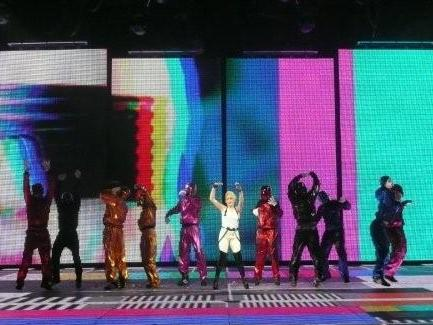
Minogue and her dancers performing album single "In My Arms" during one of the dates of the KylieX2008 tour

To promote the album's release, Minogue performed on an exclusive show on ITV called The Kylie Show, aired on 10 November 2007. Minogue performed songs from her previous albums and sneak peek songs from X, while also doing comedy sketches with her sister Dannii, her former co-star Jason Donovan, and Simon Cowell. The show aired on the Australian Seven Network on 5 February 2008. Minogue joined Jo Whiley on BBC Radio 1 for a special show, Kylie and Whiley, during which they recreated a scene from the Australian TV series Neighbours. Minogue appeared on 14 January 2008 on the Australian morning program Sunrise, her first in-studio breakfast interview in more than a decade.

Minogue went on several television shows in the US to promote the album. On 31 March 2008, she gave an interview on the Today show with Matt Lauer inside the NBC Studios in Manhattan. On 1 April, the same day X hit US stores, Minogue performed "All I See" and "Can't Get You Out of My Head" live on a season 6 episode of the American program Dancing with the Stars. It was her first performance on American TV in four years and was viewed by more than 17 million people. She was interviewed and performed "All I See" on The Late Late Show with Craig Ferguson and The Ellen DeGeneres Show. Her last appearance on the US-promo tour was on Idol Gives Back, an American Idol charitable campaign of on April 9.

To promote the album, Minogue announced her tenth concert tour in late November 2007, titled KylieX2008. It began in May 2008 and concluded in December. Travelling to Europe, South America, Asia, and Australasia, Minogue spent $20 million for the production, making it her most expensive tour at the time; in comparison, Showgirl: The Greatest Hits Tour cost her $5 million. The concerts were divided into eight segments: Xlectro Static, Cheer Squad, Beach Party, Xposed, Naughty Manga Girl, Starry Nights, Black Versus White, and the encore. Tickets for the first eight shows sold out in less than two hours in early December 2007. KylieX2008 was commercially successful, grossing $70,000,000 from ticket sales. The DVD of the tour, KylieX2008, was released on December 1, 2008.

=== Singles ===
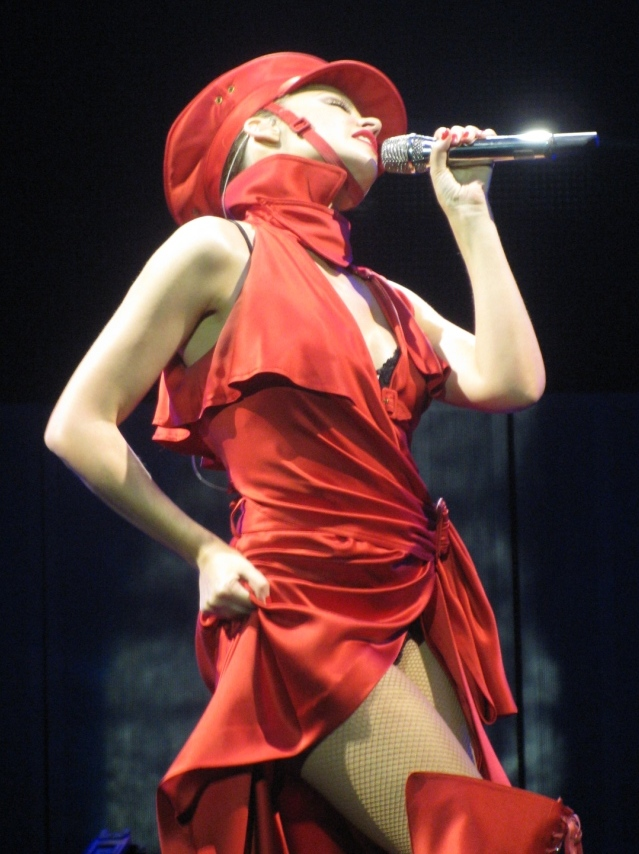
Minogue performing the album's lead single, "2 Hearts", during the KylieX2008 tour

"2 Hearts" was released as the lead single from X in October 2007. "I Don't Know What It Is" and "King or Queen" were included on the single's B-side. The single and its remixes were leaked onto file-sharing websites on 9 October 2007, forcing it to be premiered on British radio the following day. Dawn Shadforth directed the music video for "2 Hearts" filmed at Shepperton Studios in Surrey in September. The video shows Minogue singing on a stage with a band with a look similar to that of American actress Marilyn Monroe. "2 Hearts" debuted atop of the Australian Singles Chart, becoming her first number-one single since "Slow" (2003) and her tenth overall. On the UK Singles Chart, it reached a peak position of number four and remained in the top 75 for 13 weeks.

The next two singles, "Wow" and "In My Arms", were released simultaneously. "In My Arms" was issued in several European countries on 15 February 2008, while "Wow" was released as the second single in the UK and Australia two days later. "In My Arms" was later released in the UK in May. Both singles had several new mixes and previously unreleased tracks "Carried Away", "Cherry Bomb", and "Do It Again" as the B-side tracks. Melina Matsoukas filmed two music videos back-to-back for "Wow" and "In My Arms" in Los Angeles. The videos, which show Minogue dancing in a futuristic and colourful setting, were released concurrently in late January–early February. Both singles peaked within the top 10 in the UK and Scotland.

"All I See" was released as the lead single in the US on 11 March, with a version featuring rapper Mims. The black and white music video for the song was made between rehearsals for the KylieX2008 tour and released in April 2008 on Minogue's official website. The track peaked at number three on the Billboard Hot Dance Club Play chart. "The One" was digitally released as the fifth and final single in July, reaching number 36 on the UK chart. Ben Ib directed the music video in a green screen studio in the Manchester Evening News Arena, influenced by images of Carole Lombard and Lauren Bacall. On 15 December 2007, a mashup single titled "X Allmixedup" was released on iTunes in Australia and New Zealand, containing four songs from X: "2 Hearts", "The One", "In My Arms" and "Like a Drug". Despite never having been released as a single, "Speakerphone" reached number 87 on the Canadian Hot 100 based on high downloads from the album. A version of "Sensitized" featuring French singer Christophe Willem served as a promotional single in Europe, but did not appear on any major record charts.

== Critical reception ==
Professional ratings
Aggregate scores
Source	Rating
Metacritic	65/100
Review scores
Source	Rating
AllMusic	4/5 stars
Dotmusic	8/10
The Guardian	3/5 stars
musicOMH	2.5/5 stars
Pitchfork	6.6/10
PopMatters	6/10
Q	3/5 stars
Rolling Stone	3.5/5 stars
Slant Magazine	2.5/5 stars
Spin	3.5/5 stars

X received mostly positive reviews from music critics. At Metacritic, which assigns a normalised rating out of 100 to reviews from mainstream publications, the album received an average score of 65, based on 24 reviews. Long praised it as an album packed with vitality and enjoyment. Writing for The Village Voice, Hunter considered Minogue as the main factor that makes X great, who "has an ear for fantastic pop-rock tunes restyled for 2008, and she approaches them as totally vital music". Mark Sutherland, reviewing X for Billboard, dubbed the album a welcome return for Minogue and wrote the producers and songwriters were not "overshadow Minogue's perky/saucy pop/dance formula". Kelefa Sanneh of The New York Times and O'Connell commented that although X doesn't raise any high standards for the singer, it still has outstanding moments.

Some reviewers questioned the album's lyrical content and Minogue's processed vocals. Petridis dismissed the generic themes, and commented Minogue's voice through effects sounds like "a 13-year-old boy has somehow wrested control of Stephen Hawking's computer". The Observer's critic Peter Robinson viewed X as an above-average, over-thought and emotionally isolated piece of work. Barry Walters of Spin and Nick Levine of Digital Spy viewed X as a catchy set of songs, and an opportunity for her to express her feelings, but Minogue refused to give anything away. Robert Christgau criticized the sexualized lyrical content, while Hubbard opined that the pointless lyrics and Minogue's robotic delivery make the album "difficult to engage with on any level beyond its beats".

Criticism was given at the album's perceived lack of consistency. True argued that "X isn't a 'piece' as, say, Light Years was. It feels more like an artist trying to make sure she has all her bases covered." Despite considering the album as a highlight for Minogue, Spike noted some of the ballads manage to draw the album out at times. Writing for Slant Magazine, Dave Hughes argued the hit-or-miss production gives X the "focus-grouped attention deficit disorder" of a Gwen Stefani record. Sawdey praised Minogue's lively performance on the first half of X, but dismissed the second half as a set of high-class fillers and forgettable tunes. Michael Hubbard, a music critic of musicOMH, wrote that despite being an expensive-sounding album, X is "more filler than killer". Ewing opined that despite trying on many musical styles, not all of those suit her and several good tracks on the album were poorly executed.

== Accolades ==
Courtney Devores of The Charlotte Observer hailed X as one of the best mainstream dance-pop albums of 2008. The same publication ranked the album as the most underrated dance record of the year. At the 2008 Brit Awards, Minogue was nominated for International Female Solo Artist and Best International Album for X. At the ceremony, she scored her second win in the former category while losing to Foo Fighters' Echoes, Silence, Patience & Grace (2008) in the latter category. At the 22nd ARIA Music Awards, X garnered two nominations for Best Female Artist and Best Pop Release, ultimately losing both to Gabriella Cilmi's Lessons to Be Learned (2008). For their contribution to the KylieX2008, Frontier Touring Company was nominated for the Helpmann Awards for Best Australian Contemporary Concert in 2009. In the United States, Minogue received a Grammy nomination in the Best Dance/Electronic Album category, her fifth overall. At the ceremony, Minogue's album lost to Daft Punk's Alive 2007 (2007).

== Commercial performance ==
X debuted at number one on the ARIA Albums Chart with first-week sales of 16,000 copies. It was Minogue's third number-one album in her native Australia, following Light Years (2000) and Fever (2001). The album spent 14 weeks in the top 50, ultimately earning a platinum certification from the Australian Recording Industry Association (ARIA) within the year, for shipments over 70,000 copies. It was the 49th best-selling album of 2007 in Australia. In New Zealand, however, it is Minogue's lowest-charting studio album to date, spending one week at number 38 on the RIANZ Albums Chart. In the United States, the album sold 6,000 units in its first week, compared to sales of 43,000 copies of her previous album Body Language during its release week in 2004. It charted at number 139 on the Billboard 200 and her first entry at number four on the Top Electronic Albums chart. By March 2011, the album had sold 42,000 units in the US.

X debuted and peaked at number four on the UK Albums Chart, selling 82,370 copies in its first week. It was her twelfth top-ten album and her eighth studio album to do so. Within days of its release, the British Phonographic Industry (BPI) certified the album platinum on 30 November 2007. It appeared on the UK year-end album chart in 2007 and 2008, at number 51 and number 100, respectively. The album had sold 473,537 copies in the UK by October 2020. X peaked at number six on the Scottish Albums Chart, and number 14 on the Irish Albums chart. It was certified gold by the Irish Recorded Music Association in 2007. In Japan, the album peaked at number 40 on the Oricon Albums Chart and stayed there for 13 weeks.

X peaked at number five on the Billboard European Albums chart, based on its commercial performance in Europe. It ended up being the 64th best-selling album of 2008 in Europe. The album peaked at number nine in Switzerland, her fourth top-10 entry, while reaching the top 20 in Austria, the Czech Republic, Germany, and Hungary. X also entered the top 40 in Netherlands, Spain, Sweden, Denmark and Italy. In Belgium, the album appeared on both regional charts: it peaked at number 26 on the Ultratop Flanders chart, and number 23 on the Wallonia chart. It was the 78th best-selling album of 2008 in the region of Wallonia, and was certified gold by Belgian Entertainment Association in 2007. In France, X became Minogue's highest entry of the decade, peaking at number 19. It received the gold certification from the Syndicat National de l'Édition Phonographique in December 2007, and appeared on the 2008 year-end chart at number 158. As of December 2008, X had sold one million copies worldwide.

== Track listing ==
X – Standard version
No.	Title	Writer(s)	Producer(s)	Length
1.	"2 Hearts"	Jim Eliot; Mima Stilwell	Kish Mauve	2:51
2.	"Like a Drug"	Mich Hedin Hansen; Jonas Jeberg; Engelina Andrina; Adam Powers	Cutfather; Jeberg	3:18
3.	"In My Arms"	Kylie Minogue; Calvin Harris; Richard "Biff" Stannard; Paul Harris; Julian Peake	C. Harris; Stannard	3:32
4.	"Speakerphone"	Christian Karlsson; Pontus Winnberg; Henrik Jonback; Klas Åhlund	Bloodshy and Avant	3:54
5.	"Sensitized"	Guy Chambers; Cathy Dennis; Serge Gainsbourg	Chambers; Dennis	3:57
6.	"Heart Beat Rock"	Minogue; Karen Poole; C. Harris; John Lipsey	C. Harris	3:24
7.	"The One"	Minogue; Stannard; James Wiltshire; Russell Small; John Andersson; Johan Emmoth; Emma Holmgren	Stannard; Freemasons	4:05
8.	"No More Rain"	Minogue; Poole; Karlsson; Winnberg; Jonas Quant	Greg Kurstin; Poole^{[a]}	4:02
9.	"All I See"	Jeberg; Hansen; Edwin Serrano; Raymond Calhoun	Jeberg; Cutfather	3:05
10.	"Stars"	Minogue; Stannard; P. Harris; Peake	Stannard; P. Harris; Peake	3:41
11.	"Wow"	Minogue; Poole; Kurstin	Kurstin; Poole^{[a]}	3:10
12.	"Nu-di-ty"	Poole; Karlsson; Winnberg	Bloodshy and Avant	3:04
13.	"Cosmic"	Minogue; Eg White	White; Matt Prisne^{[b]}	3:09
Total length:				45:12

X – CD-ROM bonus track download
No.	Title	Writer(s)	Producer(s)	Length
14.	"Rippin' Up the Disco"	Hansen; Jeberg; Jasmine Baird	Cutfather; Jeberg	3:29

X – Special edition bonus DVD
No.	Title	Length
1.	"Xposed" (interview with Kylie)	24:39
2.	"Photo Gallery" (with Xclusive 'White Diamond' Track)	2:49
3.	"White Diamond" (film trailer)	1:04
4.	"2 Hearts" (music video)	2:53

X – USB edition bonus content
No.	Title	Length
1.	"2 Hearts" (music video)	2:53
2.	"White Diamond" (film trailer)	1:04

X – Australian and New Zealand iTunes Store bonus tracks
No.	Title	Writer(s)	Producer(s)	Length
14.	"Magnetic Electric"	Minogue; Poole; Kurstin	Kurstin	3:16
15.	"White Diamond"	Minogue; Babydaddy; Jake Shears	Babydaddy; Shears	3:03

X – European iTunes Store bonus track
No.	Title	Writer(s)	Producer(s)	Length
14.	"Heart Beat Rock" (Benny Blanco Remix featuring MC Spank Rock)	Minogue; Poole; C. Harris; Lipsey	C. Harris	3:13

X – Japanese edition bonus tracks
No.	Title	Writer(s)	Producer(s)	Length
14.	"King or Queen"	Minogue; Poole; Kurstin	Kurstin	2:39
15.	"I Don't Know What It is"	Minogue; Stannard; P. Harris; Peake; Rob Davis	Stannard; P. Harris; Peake	3:18

X – Mexican special edition bonus tracks
No.	Title	Writer(s)	Producer(s)	Length
14.	"In My Arms" (featuring Aleks Syntek)	Minogue; C. Harris; Stannard; P. Harris; Peake	C. Harris; Stannard	3:40
15.	"In My Arms" (Spitzer Dub Remix)	Minogue; C. Harris; Stannard; P. Harris; Peake	C. Harris; Stannard	5:03
16.	"Wow" (CSS Remix)	Minogue; Poole; Kurstin	Kurstin	3:16
17.	"Carried Away"	Minogue; Kurstin; Poole	Kurstin	3:17
18.	"Cherry Bomb"	Minogue; Karlsson; Winnberg; Quant; Poole	Bloodshy and Avant	4:17
19.	"Do It Again"	Minogue; Kurstin; Poole	Kurstin	3:22

X – US edition bonus track
No.	Title	Writer(s)	Producer(s)	Length
14.	"All I See" (featuring Mims)	Jeberg; Hansen; Serrano; Calhoun	Cutfather; Jeberg	3:51

X – US edition Amazon digital bonus track
No.	Title	Writer(s)	Producer(s)	Length
15.	"Carried Away"	Minogue; Poole; Kurstin	Kurstin	3:14

X – US edition iTunes digital bonus track
No.	Title	Writer(s)	Producer(s)	Length
14.	"Magnetic Electric"	Minogue; Poole; Kurstin	Kurstin	3:16
15.	"All I See" (featuring Mims)	Jeberg; Hansen; Serrano; Calhoun	Cutfather; Jeberg	3:51

X – Australian Tour edition (Disc 2)
No.	Title	Length
1.	"2 Hearts" (Harris & Masterson Extended Mix)	4:25
2.	"2 Hearts" (Alan Braxe Remix)	4:52
3.	"The One" (Freemasons Vocal Club Mix)	9:13
4.	"Wow" (David Guetta Remix)	6:23
5.	"Wow" (CSS Remix)	3:14
6.	"In My Arms" (Chris Lake Vocal Mix)	6:36
7.	"In My Arms" (Steve Pitron & Max Sanna Remix)	6:41
8.	"In My Arms" (Sébastien Léger Remix)	7:02
9.	"In My Arms" (Spitzer Remix)	3:30
10.	"All I See" (Remix featuring Mims)	3:50

X – Southern Asia Tour edition bonus tracks (Disc 1)
No.	Title	Length
1.	"All I See" (featuring Mims)	3:51
2.	"Magnetic Electric"	3:16
3.	"The One" (Freemasons Vocal Club Mix)	9:16
4.	"Can't Get You Out of My Head" (Greg Kurstin Remix)	4:03

X – Southern Asia Tour edition bonus DVD
No.	Title	Length
1.	"2 Hearts" (music video)
2.	"2 Hearts" (making of)
3.	"Wow" (music video)
4.	"Wow" (making of)
5.	"In My Arms" (music video)
6.	"In My Arms" (behind the scenes)
7.	"Wow" (live at Brit Awards 2008)

Notes

- ^{^a} signifies a vocal co-producer
- ^{^b} signifies an additional producer
- "Sensitized" incorporates a sample from "Bonnie and Clyde", written by Serge Gainsbourg, performed by Gainsbourg and Brigitte Bardot.
- "All I See" contains an interpolation of "Outstanding", written by Raymond Calhoun, performed by The Gap Band.
- The Chinese edition replaces the solo version of "In My Arms" with the version featuring Jolin Tsai, while omitting the tracks "Like a Drug", "Speakerphone" and "Nu-di-ty" due to censorship.

== Personnel ==
Credits adapted from the liner notes of X.

=== Musicians ===
- Kylie Minogue – vocals
- Jim Eliot – drums, percussion, guitar, piano, Moog, ARP strings, Rhodes piano, hand claps, theremin (track 1)
- Mima Stilwell – backing vocals (track 1)
- Moray McLaren – bass (track 1)
- Jonas Jeberg – keyboards, programming, vocal arrangement (tracks 2, 9)
- Mich Hedin Hansen – percussion (tracks 2, 9)
- Adam Powers – vocal arrangement (track 2)
- Engelina Andrina – vocal arrangement, backing vocals (track 2)
- Bloodshy & Avant – keyboards, programming, additional guitar, bass (tracks 4, 12)
- Henrik Jonback – guitar (tracks 4, 12); bass (track 4)
- Cathy Dennis – backing vocals (track 5)
- Richard Flack – programming, additional backing vocals (track 5)
- Guy Chambers – keyboards (track 5)
- Paul Stanborough – electric guitar, additional programming (track 5)
- Karen Poole – backing vocals (tracks 6, 8, 11, 12)
- James Wiltshire – keyboards (track 7)
- Russell Small – percussion (track 7)
- Ian Kirkham – alto saxophone, electronic wind instrument (track 7)
- Amanda Wilson – additional vocals (track 7)
- Edwin "Lil' Eddie" Serrano – vocal arrangement, backing vocals (track 9)
- Richard "Biff" Stannard – keyboards, bass (track 10)
- Paul Harris – keyboards (track 10)
- Julian Peake – keyboards, bass (track 10)
- Seton Daunt – guitar (track 10)
- Ash Howes – additional programming (track 10)
- Jonas Quant – additional programming (track 12)
- Eg White – all instruments (track 13)

=== Technical ===
- Kish Mauve – production, recording engineering (track 1)
- Dan Grech-Marguerat – recording engineering (track 1)
- Cesar Gimeno Lavin – recording engineering (track 1)
- Dave Bascombe – mixing (track 1)
- Geoff Pesche – mastering (at Abbey Road Studios, London)
- Cutfather – production, mixing (tracks 2, 9)
- Jonas Jeberg – production, recording (tracks 2, 9); mixing (track 2)
- Mads Nilsson – mixing (tracks 2, 9)
- Calvin Harris – production (tracks 3, 6); mixing (track 6)
- Richard "Biff" Stannard – production (tracks 3, 7, 10)
- Tony Salter – recording (tracks 3, 6)
- Ash Howes – recording (track 3); mixing (tracks 3, 7, 10)
- Ben Jackson – engineering assistance (track 3)
- Bloodshy & Avant – production (tracks 4, 12)
- Niklas Flyckt – mixing (tracks 4, 12)
- Guy Chambers – production (track 5)
- Cathy Dennis – production (track 5)
- Richard Flack – recording, mixing (track 5)
- Paul Stanborough – additional engineering (track 5)
- Freemasons – production (track 7)
- Greg Kurstin – production, recording, mixing (tracks 8, 11)
- Karen Poole – vocal co-production (tracks 8, 11)
- Paul Harris – production (track 10)
- Julian Peake – production (track 10)
- Eddie Miller – additional engineering (track 11)
- Eg White – production (track 13)
- Matt Prisne – additional production, mixing (track 13)

=== Artwork ===
- William Baker – photography
- Provision Studio – digital imaging and production
- Adjective Noun – sleeve direction, design

== Charts ==
=== Weekly charts ===
Chart performance for X in 2007–08
Chart (2007–2008)	Peak position
Argentine Albums (CAPIF)	7
Australian Albums (ARIA)	1
Austrian Albums (Ö3 Austria)	16
Belgian Albums (Ultratop Flanders)	26
Belgian Albums (Ultratop Wallonia)	23
Czech Albums (ČNS IFPI)	16
Danish Albums (Hitlisten)	34
Dutch Albums (Album Top 100)	29
European Albums (Billboard)	5
French Albums (SNEP)	19
German Albums (Offizielle Top 100)	15
Hungarian Albums (MAHASZ)	20
Irish Albums (IRMA)	14
Italian Albums (FIMI)	36
Japanese Albums (Oricon)	40
New Zealand Albums (RMNZ)	38
Scottish Albums (OCC)	6
Spanish Albums (Promusicae)	28
Swedish Albums (Sverigetopplistan)	28
Swiss Albums (Schweizer Hitparade)	9
UK Albums (Official Charts)	4
US Billboard 200	139
US Top Dance/Electronic Albums (Billboard)	4

=== Year-end charts ===
2007 year-end chart performance for X
Chart (2007)	Position
Australian Albums (ARIA)	49
UK Albums (OCC)	51

2008 year-end chart performance for X
Chart (2008)	Position
Belgian Albums (Ultratop Wallonia)	78
European Albums (Billboard)	64
French Albums (SNEP)	158
UK Albums (OCC)	100

== Certifications and sales ==
Certification and sales for X
Region	Certification	Certified units/sales
Australia (ARIA)	Platinum	70,000^{^}
Belgium (BRMA)	Gold	15,000^{*}
France (SNEP)	Gold	75,000^{*}
Hungary (MAHASZ)	Gold	3,000^{^}
Ireland (IRMA)	Gold	7,500^{^}
Russia (NFPF)	Gold	10,000^{*}
United Kingdom (BPI)	Platinum	473,537
United States	—	42,000
^{*} Sales figures based on certification alone.^{^} Shipments figures based on certification alone.

== Release history ==
Release dates and formats for X
Region	Date	Format(s)	Label	Ref.
Japan	21 November 2007	CD; CD + DVD; digital download	EMI Music Japan	
Australia	23 November 2007	CD; CD + DVD; digital download	Warner Music Australia	
France	23 November 2007	CD; CD + DVD; digital download	Parlophone	
Germany	23 November 2007	CD; CD + DVD; digital download	EMI Music Germany	
Italy	23 November 2007	CD; CD + DVD; digital download	EMI	
Taiwan	23 November 2007	CD; CD + DVD	Gold Typhoon	
United Kingdom	26 November 2007	CD; CD + DVD; digital download	Parlophone	
Canada	27 November 2007	CD	EMI Music Canada	
Sweden	28 November 2007	CD; digital download	EMI	
Brazil	20 February 2008	CD	EMI	
United States	1 April 2008	CD; digital download	Capitol; Astralwerks	
Mexico	June 2008	CD	Parlophone	
Taiwan	28 November 2008	CD + DVD	Gold Typhoon	
Australia	29 November 2008	2-CD	Warner Music Australia	
Various	7 August 2026	LP record	Parlophone	

== See also ==
- List of number-one albums of 2007 (Australia)
- List of UK Album Downloads Chart number ones of the 2000s
- List of UK top-ten albums in 2007
