= Brit Award for International Album =

British music award

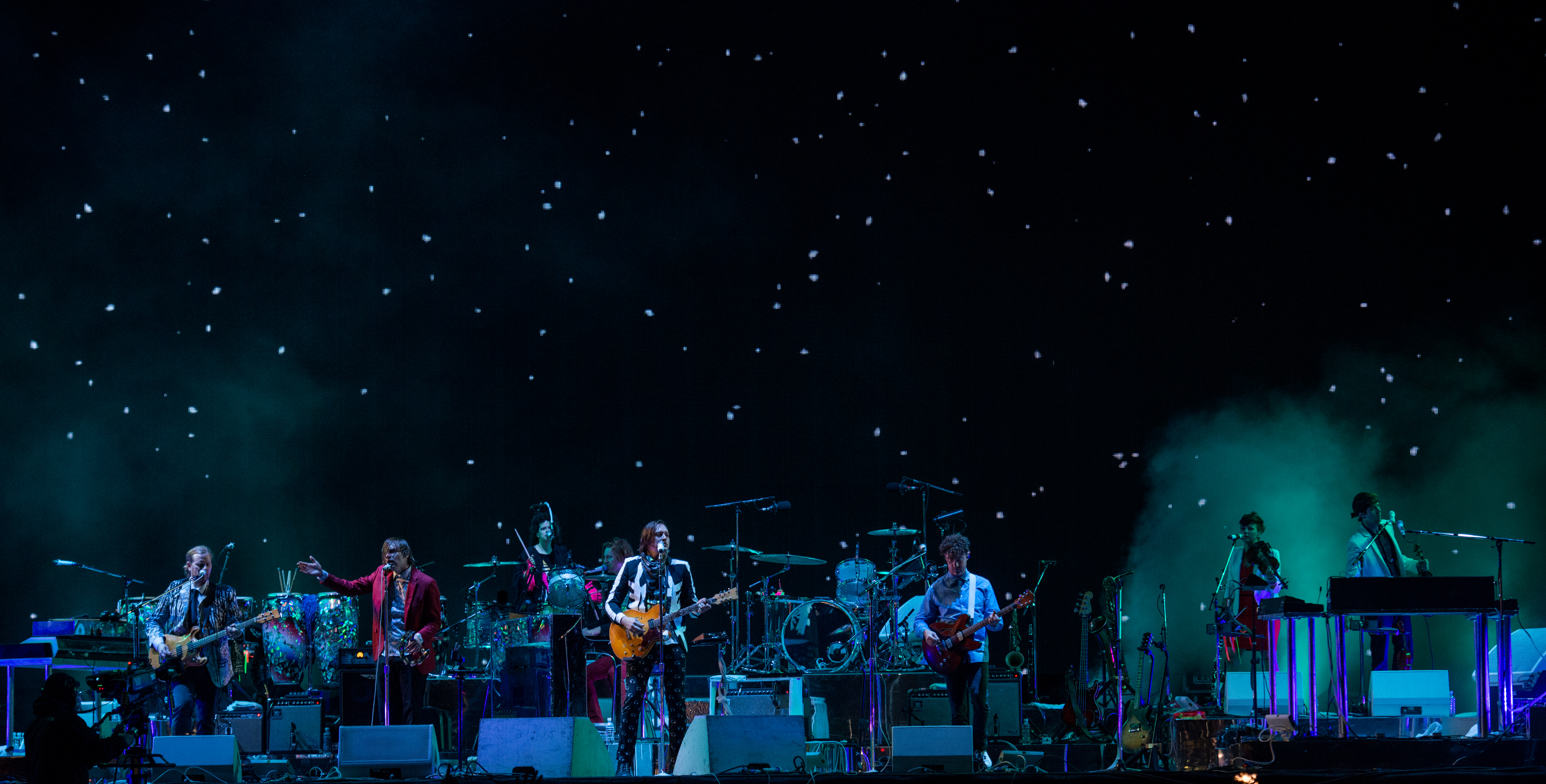
- 2011 winner Arcade Fire
- Awarded for: Achievement in Excellent International Album
- Country: United Kingdom (UK)
- Presented by: British Phonographic Industry (BPI)
- First award: 1977
- Final award: 2011
- Currently held by: Arcade Fire – The Suburbs (2011)

Highlights
- Most awards: None
- Most nominations: Arcade Fire; The Killers; Kings of Leon (3 each)
- Website: www.brits.co.uk

The Brit Award for International Album is an award given by the British Phonographic Industry (BPI), an organisation which represents record companies and artists in the United Kingdom. The accolade is presented at the Brit Awards, an annual celebration of British and international music. The winners and nominees are determined by the Brit Awards voting academy with over one-thousand members, which comprise record labels, publishers, managers, agents, media, and previous winners and nominees.

The award was first presented in 1977 as International Album. The accolade was not handed out between 1982 and 2001 and has been defunct as of 2011.

Arcade Fire, The Killers and Kings of Leon received the most nominations, with three each. Three albums were nominated in two consecutive years; Songs in A Minor by Alicia Keys in 2002 and 2003, Speakerboxxx/The Love Below by Outkast in 2004 and 2005, and How to Dismantle an Atomic Bomb by U2 in 2005 and 2006.

Only seven non-American artists were nominated for the award; Swedish group ABBA for Arrival in 1977, Australian singer Kylie Minogue for Fever in 2002 and X in 2008, French duo Daft Punk for Discovery in 2002, Irish band U2 for How to Dismantle an Atomic Bomb in 2005 and 2006, Canadian band Arcade Fire for Funeral in 2006, Neon Bible in 2008 and The Suburbs in 2011, and Australian bands AC/DC for Black Ice in 2009 and Empire of the Sun for Walking on a Dream in 2010. Minogue and Arcade Fire were also the only non-American recipients of the award, respectively winning for Fever and The Suburbs, and, along with U2, the only non-American artists with multiple nominations.

== Recipients ==
=== 1970s ===
Year	Album	Artist(s)
1977 (1st)
1977 (1st)	Bridge over Troubled Water	Simon & Garfunkel
1977 (1st)	Arrival	ABBA
1977 (1st)	Songs in the Key of Life	Stevie Wonder
1977 (1st)	Tapestry	Carole King

=== 2000s ===
Year	Album	Artist(s)
2002 (22nd)
2002 (22nd)	Fever	Kylie Minogue
2002 (22nd)	Discovery	Daft Punk
2002 (22nd)	Is This It	The Strokes
2002 (22nd)	Songs in A Minor	Alicia Keys
2002 (22nd)	Survivor	Destiny's Child
2003 (23rd)
2003 (23rd)	The Eminem Show	Eminem
2003 (23rd)	By the Way	Red Hot Chili Peppers
2003 (23rd)	Come Away with Me	Norah Jones
2003 (23rd)	Missundaztood	Pink
2003 (23rd)	Songs in A Minor	Alicia Keys
2004 (24th)
2004 (24th)	Justified	Justin Timberlake
2004 (24th)	Dangerously in Love	Beyoncé
2004 (24th)	Elephant	The White Stripes
2004 (24th)	Speakerboxxx/The Love Below	Outkast
2004 (24th)	Stripped	Christina Aguilera
2005 (25th)
2005 (25th)	Scissor Sisters	Scissor Sisters
2005 (25th)	Hot Fuss	The Killers
2005 (25th)	How to Dismantle an Atomic Bomb	U2
2005 (25th)	Songs About Jane	Maroon 5
2005 (25th)	Speakerboxxx/The Love Below	Outkast
2006 (26th)
2006 (26th)	American Idiot	Green Day
2006 (26th)	Confessions on a Dance Floor	Madonna
2006 (26th)	Funeral	Arcade Fire
2006 (26th)	How to Dismantle an Atomic Bomb	U2
2006 (26th)	Late Registration	Kanye West
2007 (27th)
2007 (27th)	Sam's Town	The Killers
2007 (27th)	FutureSex/LoveSounds	Justin Timberlake
2007 (27th)	Modern Times	Bob Dylan
2007 (27th)	St. Elsewhere	Gnarls Barkley
2007 (27th)	Ta-Dah	Scissor Sisters
2008 (28th)
2008 (28th)	Echoes, Silence, Patience & Grace	Foo Fighters
2008 (28th)	Because of the Times	Kings of Leon
2008 (28th)	Long Road Out of Eden	Eagles
2008 (28th)	Neon Bible	Arcade Fire
2008 (28th)	X	Kylie Minogue
2009 (29th)
2009 (29th)	Only by the Night	Kings of Leon
2009 (29th)	Black Ice	AC/DC
2009 (29th)	Day & Age	The Killers
2009 (29th)	Fleet Foxes	Fleet Foxes
2009 (29th)	Oracular Spectacular	MGMT

=== 2010s ===
Year	Album	Artist(s)
2010 (30th)
2010 (30th)	The Fame	Lady Gaga
2010 (30th)	The Blueprint 3	Jay-Z
2010 (30th)	The E.N.D.	Black Eyed Peas
2010 (30th)	Merriweather Post Pavilion	Animal Collective
2010 (30th)	Walking on a Dream	Empire of the Sun
2011 (31st)
2011 (31st)	The Suburbs	Arcade Fire
2011 (31st)	Come Around Sundown	Kings of Leon
2011 (31st)	The Lady Killer	CeeLo Green
2011 (31st)	Recovery	Eminem
2011 (31st)	Teenage Dream	Katy Perry

Winners of the Brit Award for International Album

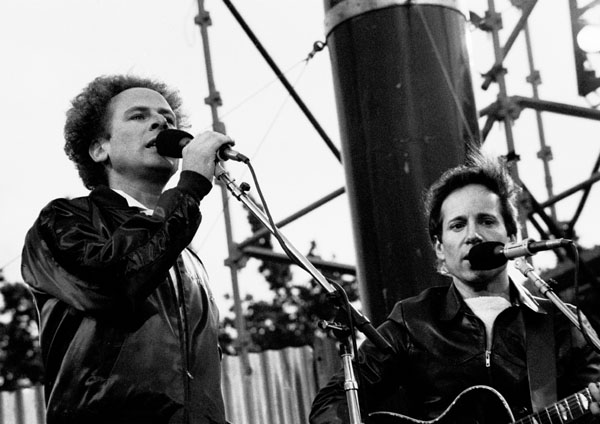
Inaugural winner Simon & Garfunkel

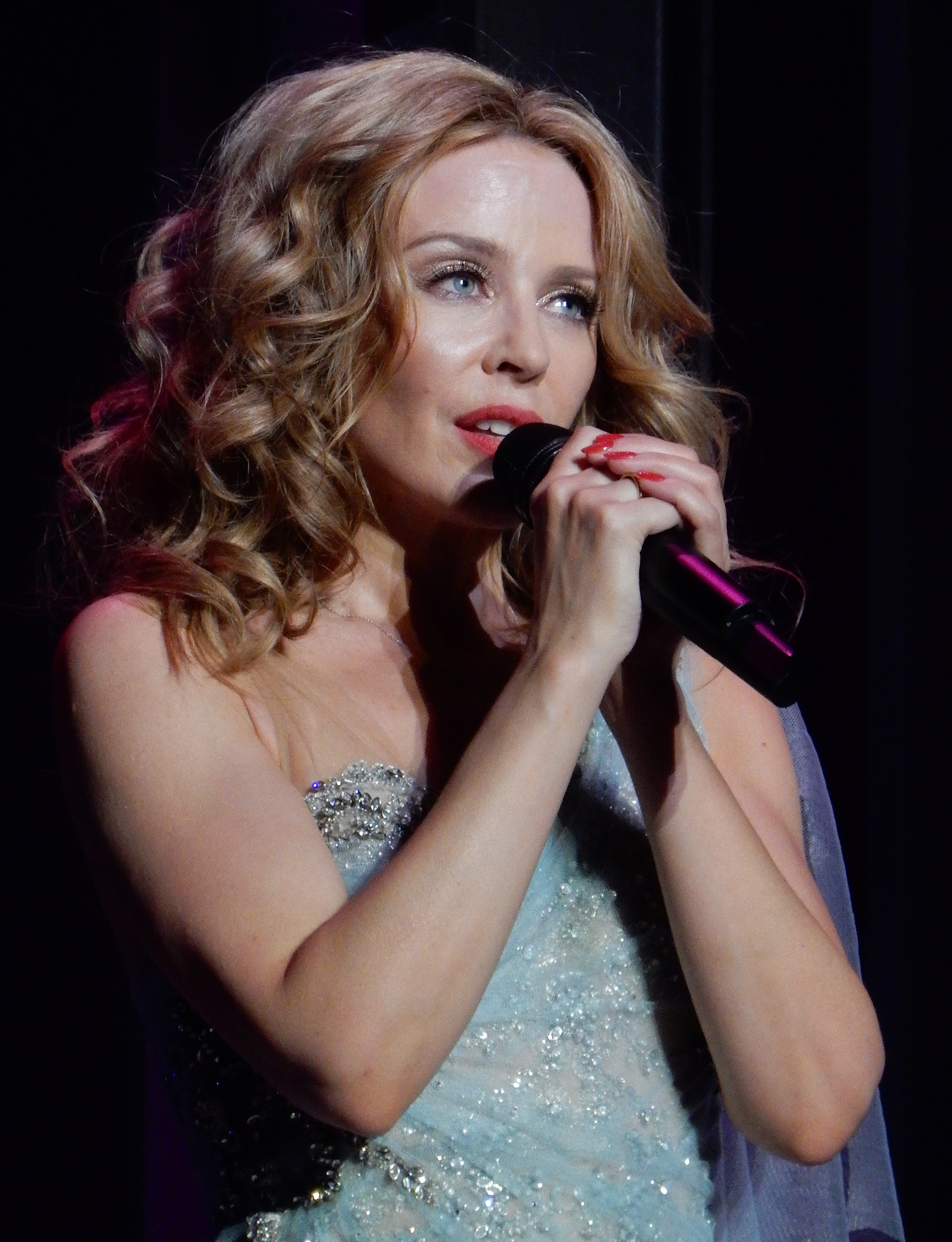
2002 winner Kylie Minogue

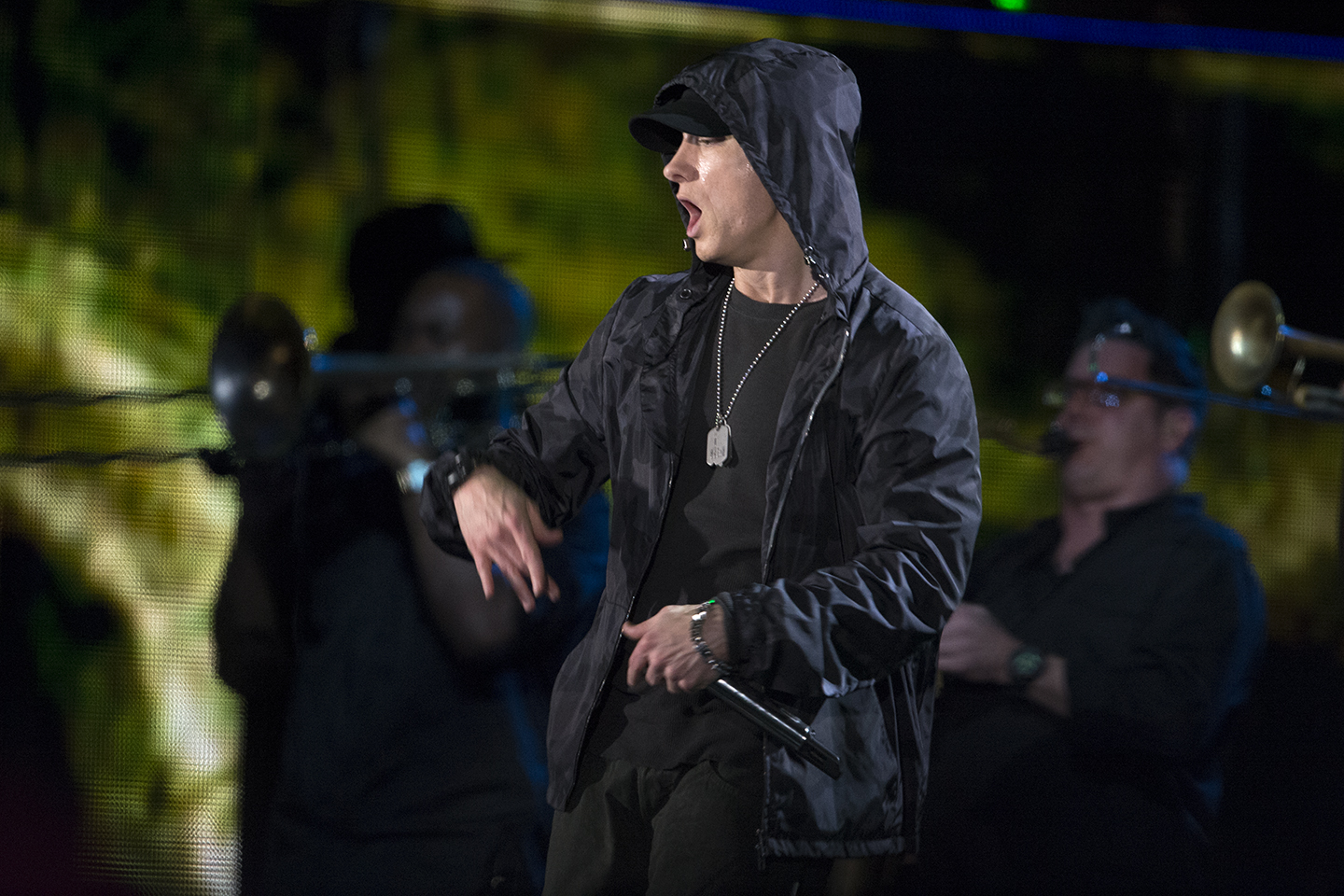
2003 winner, Eminem

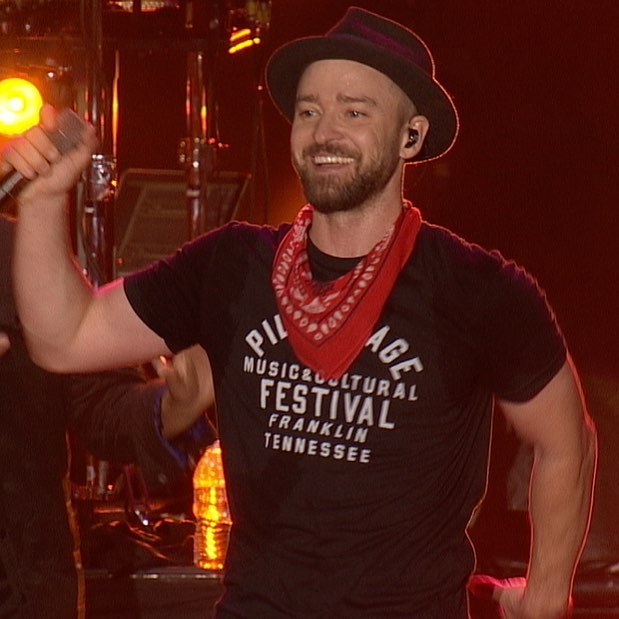
2004 winner, Justin Timberlakers

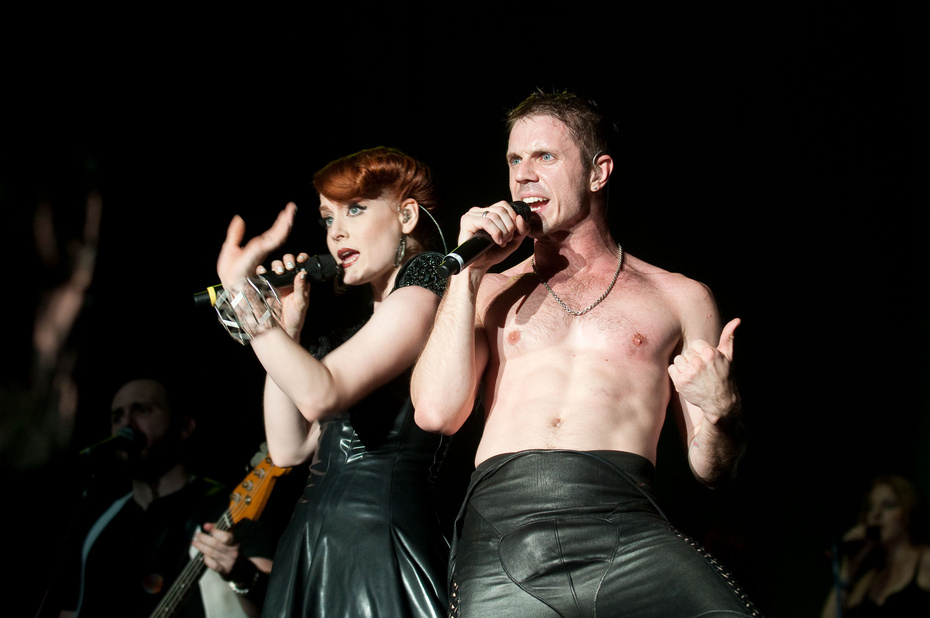
2005 winner, Scissor Sisters

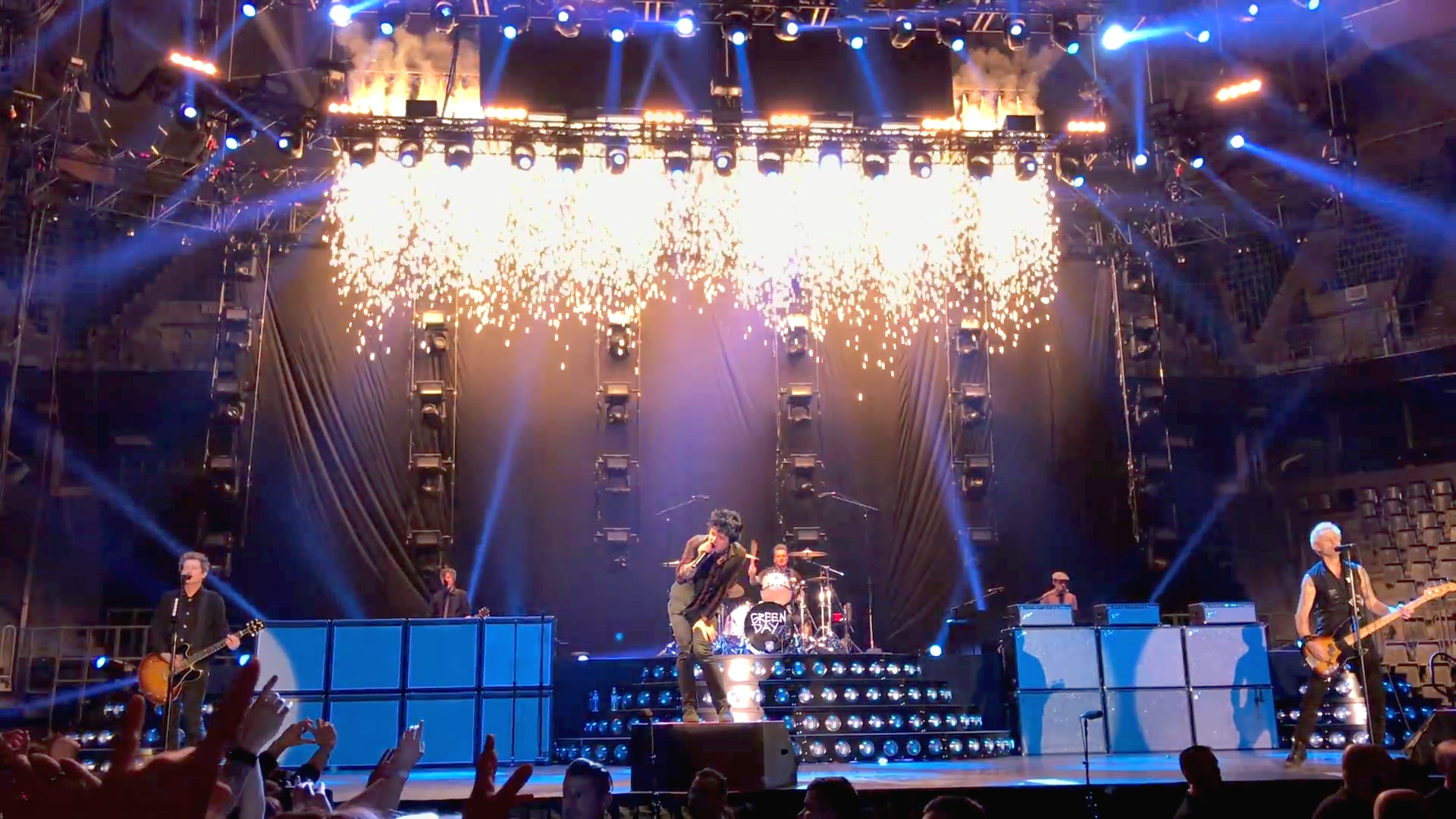
2006 winner, Green Day

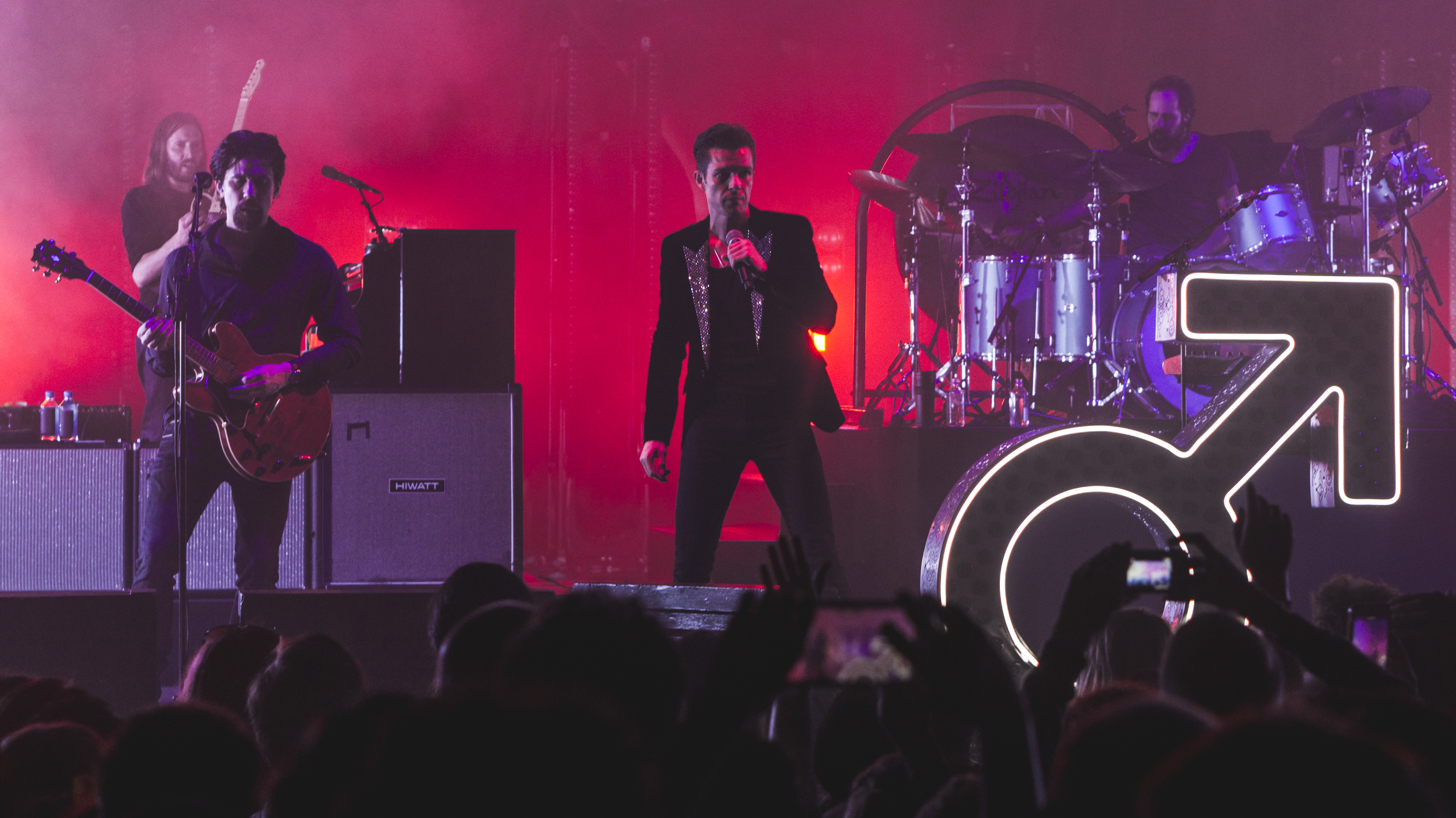
2007 winner, The Killers

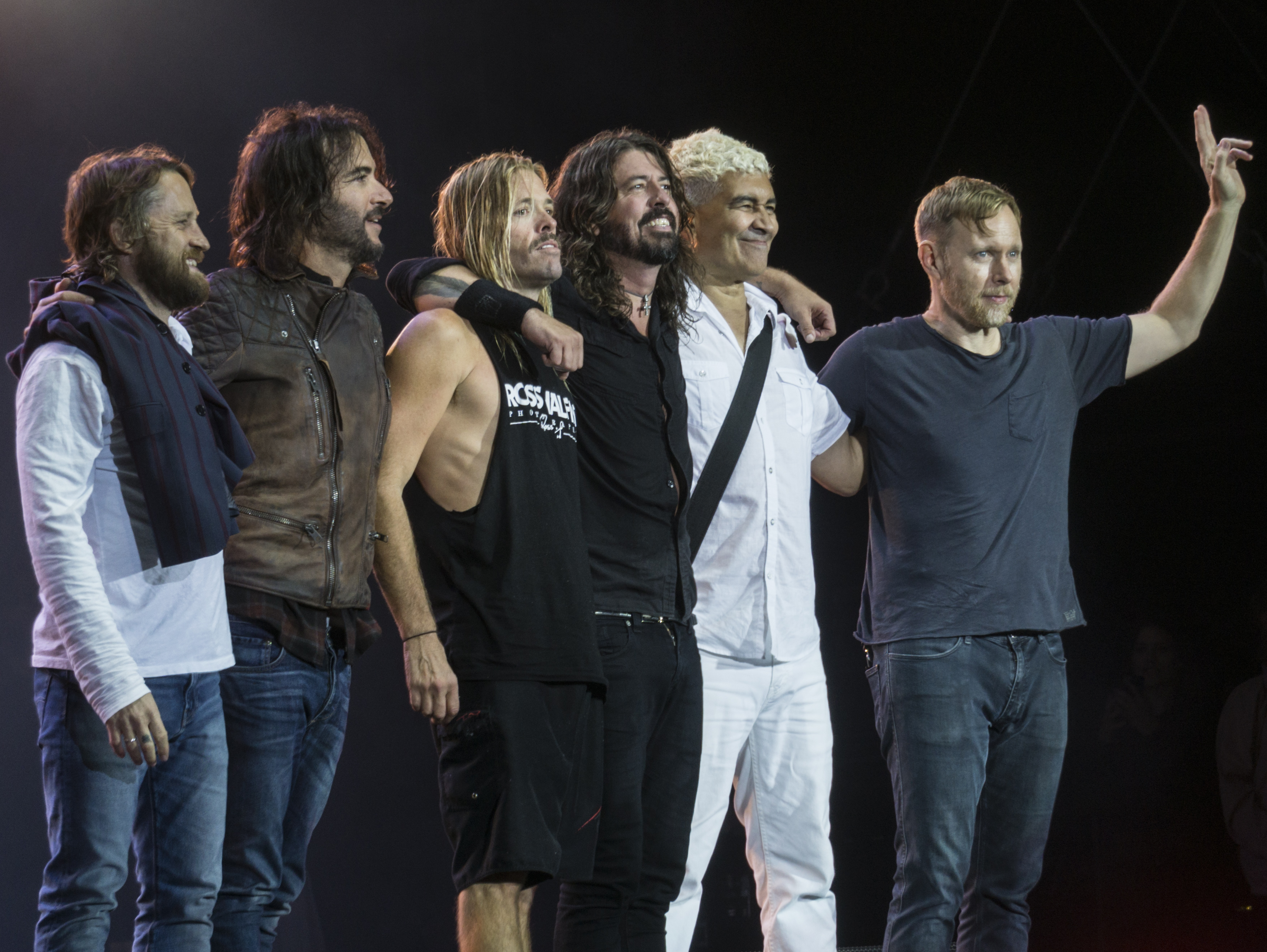
2008 winner, Foo Fighters

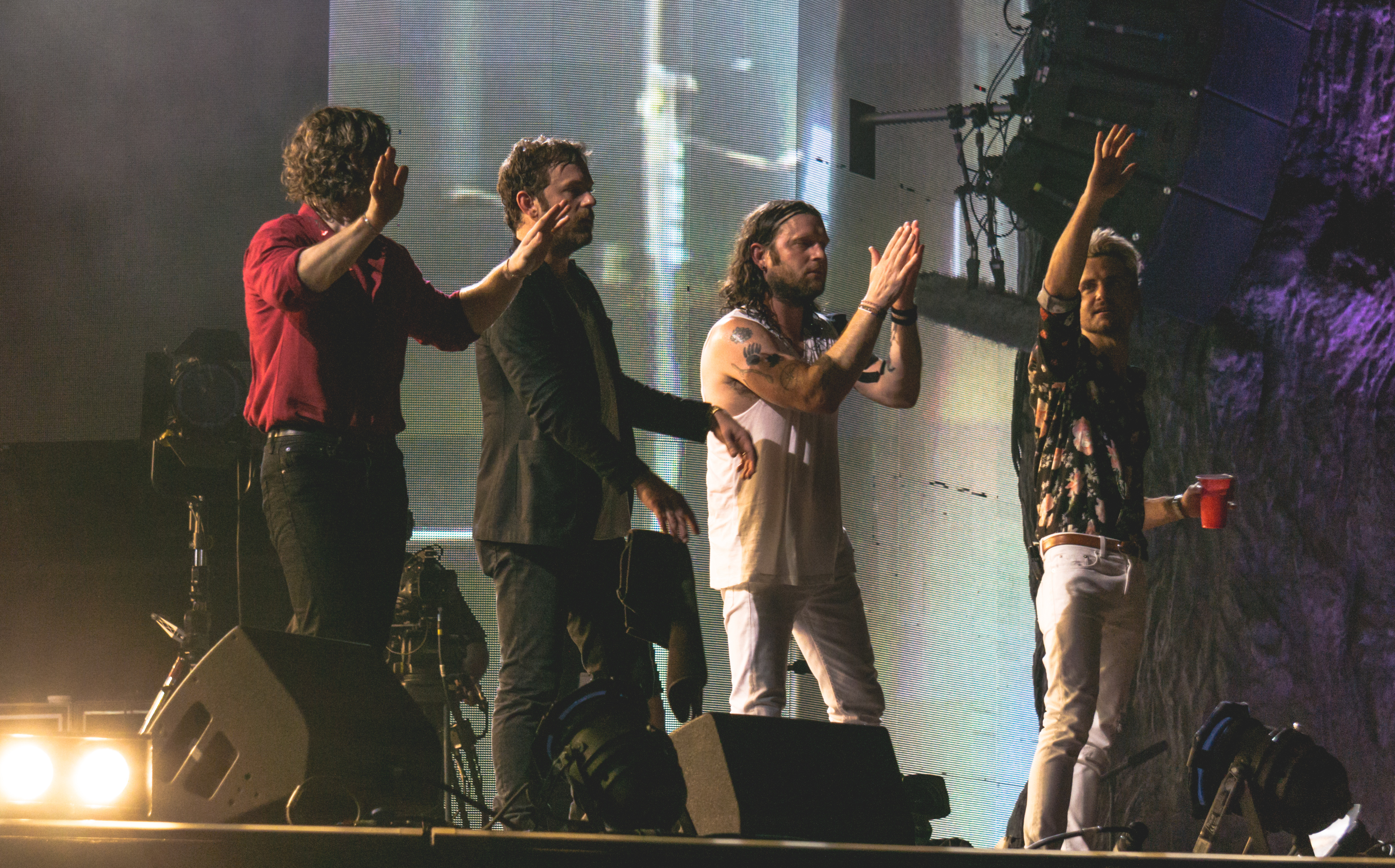
2009 winner, Kings of Leon

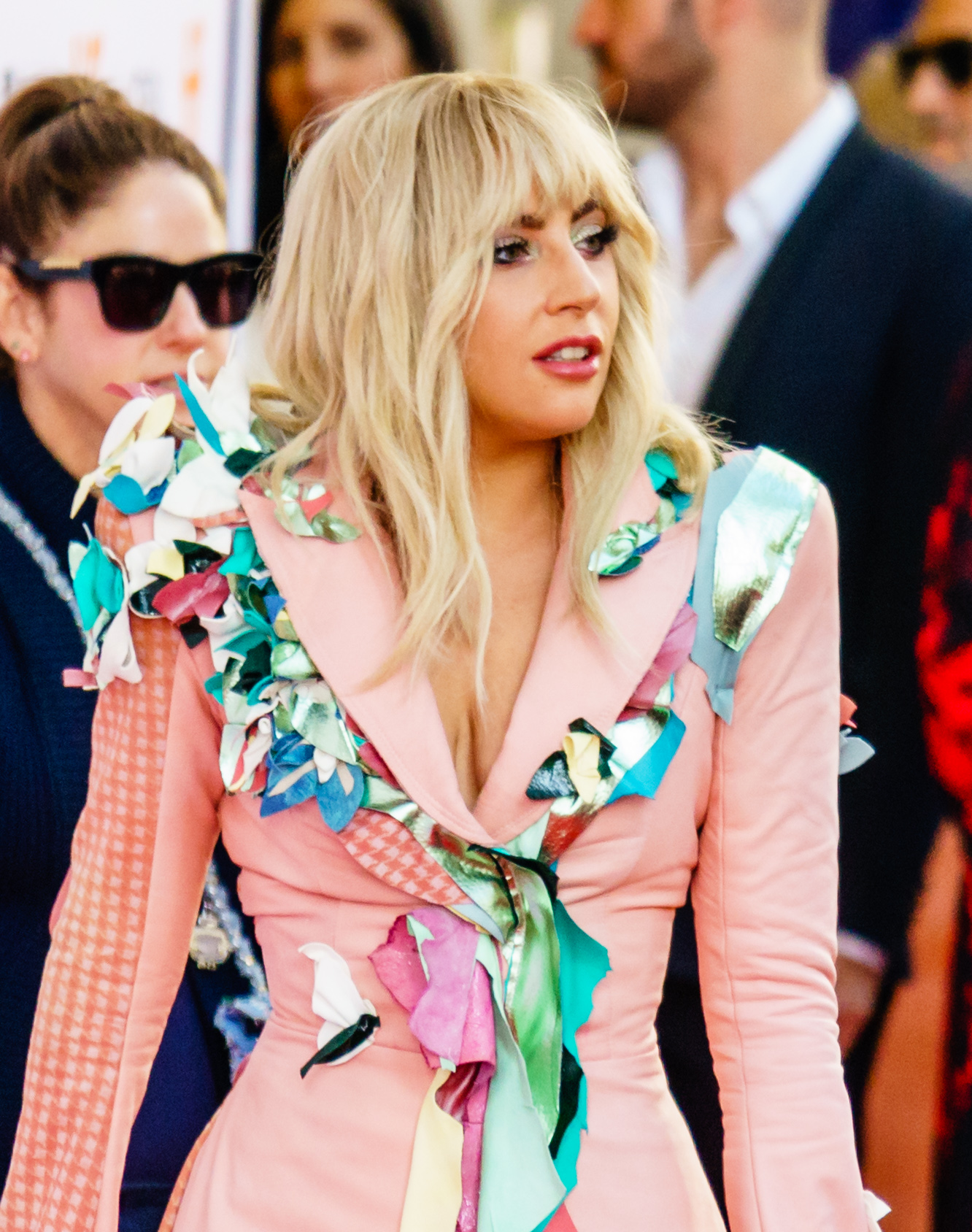
2010 winner, Lady Gaga

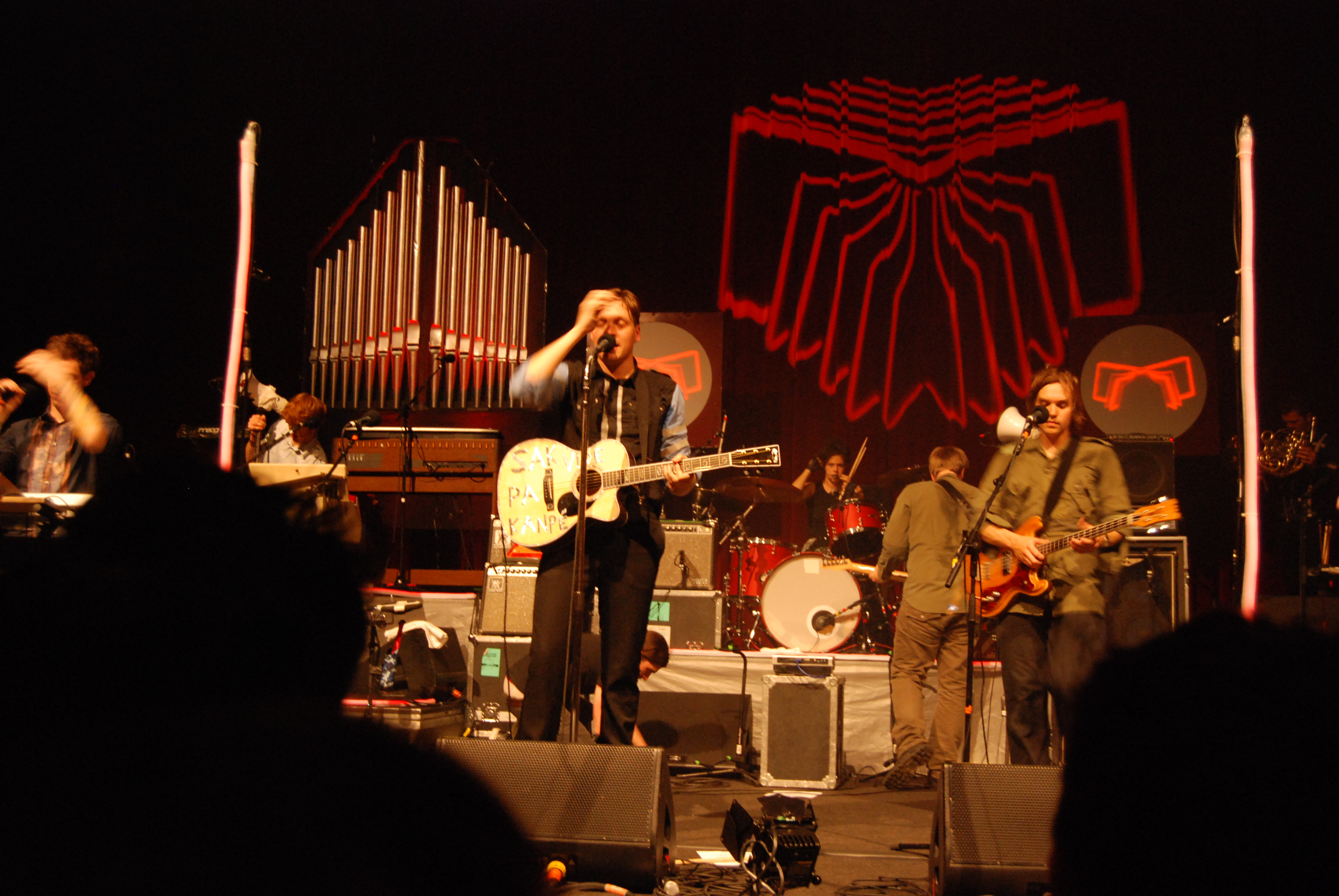
2011 winner, Arcade Fire

== Multiple nominations and awards ==
Artists that received multiple nominations
nominations	Artist
3	Arcade Fire
3	The Killers
3	Kings of Leon
2	Eminem
2	Alicia Keys
2	Kylie Minogue
2	Outkast
2	Scissor Sisters
2	Justin Timberlake
2	U2
