= Zoo Brazil =

Swedish record producer, songwriter

- Born: John Andersson
- Origin: Stockholm, Sweden
- Genres: House
- Occupations: Songwriter, producer, DJ
- Years active: 1989–present
- Label: Black Hole Recordings

John Andersson, better known as Zoo Brazil, is a Swedish multiplatinum Grammy-nominated record producer, songwriter and DJ residing in Stockholm, Sweden.

== Musical career ==
Zoo Brazil first started DJing in 1989. His father was a musician who influenced him. In 2007 he received a Grammy nomination for his work on Kylie Minogue's album X.

As a DJ he has performed all over the world at clubs including Ministry of Sound, Space and Pacha, and has played underground clubs and festivals all over the world from Australia, Europe, North and South America including Creamfields .

Andersson has written music for various Hollywood movies, TV shows such as Nip/Tuck and channels such as BBC, Discovery, MTV, HBO, Channel 4 and more. In 2012 he composed music for the para olympics opening ceremony in London and music for the Dermablend "Go Beyond The Cover"video which was awarded with the 2 silver lions at the Cannes festival.

Beginning of 2015 he released his third Djmix cd called "Songs for Clubs vol.3", remixed Giorgio Moroder & Kylie Minogue's "Right Here, Right Now" that went number 1 on Billboard Dance Chart, and released "Save Us" with Per QX on Steve Angello's Size Records.

== Discography ==
=== Albums ===
Year	Title	Release date	Label
2006	Zoo Brazil Needs You	31 July 2006	Harthouse Mannheim
2007	Video Rockets	8 May 2007	Harthouse Mannheim
2008	No Place Like Home	14 Jul 2008	Gung Ho! Recordings
2008	Happy Hands Helping	8 July 2008	Gung Ho! Recordings
2010	Please Don't Panic	8 Feb 2010	Magik Muzik
2012	Any Moment Now	3 Dec 2012	Magik Muzik
2018	Point Of View	9 Feb 2018	Magik Muzik
2020	For Sins And False Alarms	27 Mar 2020	Magik Muzik

=== Compilations ===
Year	Title	Label
2007	It's Only a Mixtape	Gung Ho Records
2008	Happy Helping Hands	Gung Ho Records
2011	Songs For Clubs	Magik Muzik
2013	Songs For Clubs 2	Magik Muzik
2015	Songs For Clubs 3	Black Hole Recordings

=== Singles ===
Year	Title	Release date	Label
2006	Tokyo	20 Dec 2006	Harthouse
2009	Wallpaper	19 Feb 2009	Electrochoc Records
2012	Give Myself Feat. Ursula Rucker	3 Dec 2012	Magik Muzik
2015	Give It Up (Zoo Brazil and Per QX)	13 July 2015	Noir Music

=== Extended Play ===
Year	Title	Release date	Label
2001	"Zoo Brazil EP"	2001	Tangent Beats
2002	"The Flavour"	2002	Spacefunk Recordings
2003	"Next To You"	2003	Airtight
2002	"Future Chock E.P."	2003	Kass Recordings

=== Remixes ===
Year	Title	Artist	Label
2002	Put The Needle on It (Laid's Zoo Brazil Remix)	Dannii Minogue	London Records
2005	Gotta Be Real (Zoo Brazil Remix	Jazzy Eyewear	UMA Recordings
2005	Samo Iluzija (Zoo Brazil Remix)	Ian Pooley	Pooledmusic
2006	All This Love (Zoo Brazil Remix	The Similou	Sony BMG Music
2006	Gotta Be Real (Zoo Brazil Remix)	Darren Emerson & Magik Johnson	Underwater Records
2006	Take Your Pills (Zoo Brazil Remix)	Sébastien Léger	Kingdom Kome Cuts
2006	Atol (Zoo Brazil Remix)	Gui Boratto	Harthouse Mannheim
2006	All This Love (Zoo Brazil Remix)	Tocadisco & Mark James	EQ Recordings
2006	The Call (Zoo Brazil Remix)	John Dahlbäck	Pickadoll Records
2006	Big Time Allusion (Zoo Brazil Remix)	Santiago & Bushido	So Sound Recordings
2007	Where's The Fun (Zoo Brazil Remix)	DK 7-002	DK7
2007	Backscratch (Zoo Brazil Remix)	Alex Parsons	Brique Rouge
2008	Bubblicious (Zoo Brazil Remix)	Rex The Dog	Hundehaus Records
2008	1000 Lords (Zoo Brazil Remix)	Butch	Craft Music
2008	Power of You (Zoo Brazil Remix)	Allure Featuring Christian Burns	Magik Muzik
2008	Gypsy (Zoo Brazil Remix)	Steve Angello	Size Records
2008	Fired Up (Zoo Brazil Mix)	Denis The Menace & Big World	3 Beat Blue
2008	Shake Your (Zoo Brazil Rmx)	Sharam Jey	King Kong Records
2008	The Book (Zoo Brazil Mix)	Salt City Orchestra	Paper Recordings
2008	Darkness Zoo Brazil Remix	Greg Cerrone	On The Air Music
2008	Fired Up (Zoo Brazil Remix)	Kevin Saunderson	Resident Advisor
2008	Jove (Zoo Brazil Mix)	Herbst & Blecha	Youngsociety Records
2009	What Will I Do? (Zoo Brazil Remix)	Julie Thompson	Magik Muzik
2009	New Direction (Zoo Brazil Remix)	Robbie Rivera	Stop And Go
2009	Metropolis (Zoo Brazil Remix)	Kris Menace	New State Recordings
2010	You Are Not Alone (Zoo Brazil Mix)	Mason	Animal Language
2010	Love No Limit (Zoo Brazil Remix)	Kai & Kyle	Toolroom Records
2011	Drunk Text (Zoo Brazil Remix)	Manufactured Superstars Feat. Lea Luna	Magik Muzik
2011	Remedy (Zoo Brazil Remix)	Therese	Universal Music
2012	Call Your Name (Zoo Brazil Radio Edit)	Gravitonas	SoFo Records
2012	Blueberries (Zoo Brazil Remix)	Zombie Nation	Turbo
2012	You Need Some (Zoo Brazil Remix)	Prok & Fitch vs Marco Lys	Great Stuff Recordings
2012	Skeleton Key (Zoo Brazil Remix)	Pleasurekraft Feat. Green Velvet	Great Stuff Recordings
2012	How Never (Zoo Brazil Remix)	Beatamines & David Jach	Keno Records
2013	Suede (Zoo Brazil Remix)	Zombie Nation	Turbo
2013	Big Fun (Zoo Brazil Remix)	Kevin Saunderson Presents Inner City	KMS
2013	Melanchromantic (Zoo Brazil Remix)	Toureau	Blackfoxmusic
2013	Canta Marina (Zoo Brazil Remix)	Daniel Boon	Ostfunk Records
2013	Signed on My Tattoo (Zoo Brazil Remix)	Army of Lovers Featuring Gravitonas	SoFo Records
2014	Ad Brown With Steve Kaetzel Feat. Arielle Maren	Like The Sunrise	Black Hole Recordings
2015	Right Here, Right Now (Zoo Brazil Remix)	Giorgio Moroder Feat Kylie Minogue	Sony
