= All I See =

2008 single by Kylie Minogue

Single by Kylie Minogue

from the album X
- Released: 11 March 2008
- Studio: Jeberg Studio (Copenhagen, Denmark)
- Genre: R&B
- Length: 3:04
- Label: Parlophone
- Songwriters: Jonas Jeberg; Mich Hedin Hansen; Edwin "Lil' Eddie" Serrano
- Producers: Jonas Jeberg; Cutfather

Kylie Minogue singles chronology
"In My Arms" (2008)	"All I See" (2008)	"The One" (2008)

Music video
- "All I See" on YouTube

"All I See" is a song recorded by Australian Kylie Minogue for her tenth studio album X (2007). It was written by Jonas Jeberg, Mich Hedin Hansen, Edwin "Lil' Eddie" Serrano, and produced by Jeberg and Cutfather. An R&B track, the song contains an interpolation from The Gap Band's "Outstanding". "All I See" was released as the fourth (Note: "All I See" was released as the lead single from X in North America, following three singles released elsewhere, and later as the fifth in Oceania, following "The One".) single from X on 11 March 2008, by Parlophone. A remix featuring rapper Mims was serviced to US radio stations and included as a bonus track on the North American edition of X.

== Release ==
To promote the single and the album in the United States, Minogue appeared on several television programmes. On 31 March 2008, she appeared on the Today show for an interview with Matt Lauer. On 1 April, Minogue performed "All I See" live on Dancing with the Stars. On 7 April 2008, Minogue performed "All I See" on The Ellen DeGeneres Show. The single was particularly released in the US and in Canada to boost Minogue's image in the States, as it appeared she had a low profile, but the song only managed to peak at number 3 on the US dance chart.

== Music video ==
The accompanying music video for "All I See" was directed by William Baker, Minogue's creative director. It was filmed in three hours while Minogue was on break from KylieX2008 tour rehearsals. The video premiered on Minogue's website on 18 April 2008. Filmed in black-and-white, it features Minogue in various outfits accompanied by dancer Marco da Silva, dancing in front of a white background. The singer described the visual as "Very low-fi, just Willie and Marco (one of my dancers) and a white backdrop. And, as I always say...'When in doubt, apply more glitter!'. Girl can't get enough of a glitter drop!".

== Critical response ==
"All I See" received generally mixed reviews from most music critics. Sal Cinquemani from Slant Magazine gave it an extended review. He said:

Minogue has churned out three singles from her album X since its international release last year, but it's another song, "All I See," that will be the record's official first single in the U.S. It's one of only three tracks that don't seem to fit the otherwise consistent Euro-disco mash-up of the singer's 10th studio album (the belated Ray of Light rip-off "No More Rain" and the Fergie/Gwen-meets-the-Pussycat-Dolls-meets-"SexyBack" monstrosity that is "Nu-Di-Ty" are the other offenders), but that's exactly why it's a perfect fit for this country. In his review of X, Slant critic Dave Hughes compared "All I See" to Janet Jackson's 1997 "Together Again," and while the breathy vocals are totally Janet, the rest of the song is a virtual carbon copy of Ne-Yo's "Because of You," right down to the measured 4/4 beat and harpsichord.

If radio programmers could find room on their playlists for Natasha Bedingfield's market-pandering "Love Like This," then surely they can find space for "All I See." Although a remix featuring MIMS will be serviced to radio stations soon, there's still no video in sight, so if the song fails, Minogue's American fans can blame her record label, which hasn't figured out how to market the superstar in the U.S. since "Can't Get You Out of My Head".

== Live performances ==
To promote the single's release in the United States, Minogue appeared on some television shows to perform "All I See". She sang the track along with "Can't Get You Out of My Head" live on the results show of Dancing with the Stars on 1 April 2008. For the number, she wore a platinum blonde bobbed wig, red sequined mini-dress and gold platform shoes; it was her first performance on American television in five years, and was watched by an audience of 20 million viewers. Minogue also performed the song on The Late Late Show with Craig Ferguson, and The Ellen DeGeneres Show, and at selected shows of the KylieX2008 concert tour.

== Formats and track listings ==
- Australian, Canadian, New Zealand and US digital single
1. "All I See" – 3:04
- Australian and New Zealand digital EP
1. "All I See" – 3:04
2. "All I See" (Remix feat. MIMS) – 3:51
3. "In My Arms" (Spitzer Dub) – 5:03
- Promo CD
1. "All I See" (Album Version)
2. "All I See" (Extended Version)
3. "All I See" (Instrumental)

== Charts ==
=== Weekly charts ===
Chart (2008)	Peak position
Canada Hot 100 (Billboard)	81
Global Dance Tracks (Billboard)	37
Hungary (Rádiós Top 40)	36
Romania (Romanian Top 100)	92
US Dance Club Songs (Billboard)	3

=== Year-end charts ===
Chart (2008)	Position
US Dance Club Play (Billboard)	26

== Release history ==
Release dates and formats for "All I See"
Region	Date	Format(s)	Label(s)	Ref.
United States	11 March 2008	Digital download	Capitol	
United States	15 April 2008	Contemporary hit radio; rhythmic contemporary radio	Capitol	
Australia	22 November 2008	Digital download (EP)	Warner Music Australia	
