= In My Arms (Kylie Minogue song) =

2008 single by Kylie Minogue

- UK cover art

Single by Kylie Minogue

from the album X
- B-side: "Carried Away"; "Cherry Bomb"; "Do It Again"
- Released: 13 February 2008
- Studio: EMI Publishing, Olympic (London, England)
- Genre: Synth-pop; dance-pop; disco-pop
- Length: 3:32
- Label: Parlophone
- Songwriters: Kylie Minogue; Calvin Harris; Richard "Biff" Stannard; Paul Harris; Julian Peake
- Producers: Calvin Harris; Richard "Biff" Stannard

Kylie Minogue singles chronology
"Wow" (2008)	"In My Arms" (2008)	"All I See" (2008)

Music video
- "In My Arms" on YouTube

"In My Arms" is a song recorded by Australian singer Kylie Minogue for her tenth studio album X (2007). It was written by Minogue, Paul Harris, Julian Peake, and its producers Calvin Harris and Richard "Biff" Stannard. The song was released as the third (Note: "In My Arms" was released as the second single from X across mainland Europe, and later as the third in Oceania and the UK, following "Wow".) single from X on 13 February 2008.

"In My Arms" is a synth-pop inspired song, which features elements of retro and dance music. The song received generally favourable reviews from music critics, with some praising the lyrics and deeming it as one of the best tracks on the album. However, some reviewers were critical towards the production of the song. Commercially, "In My Arms" was generally successful, peaking inside the top ten in countries including Romania, Belgium, France, Switzerland, Germany and the United Kingdom. However, the song experienced lower success in her native Australia, where it peaked at thirty-five, becoming her lowest charting single since "Cowboy Style" (1998).

The music video for "In My Arms" was directed by Melina Matsoukas and filmed in Los Angeles, California, along with the video for "Wow". Minogue has performed the song on six of her concert tours, most recently during the Tension Tour in 2025.

== Background and release ==
Before the production of X, Minogue was diagnosed with breast cancer on 17 May 2005, leading to the postponement of the remainder of her Showgirl: The Greatest Hits Tour and her withdrawal from the Glastonbury Festival. While recovering in Melbourne, Minogue began writing lyrics towards the end of her cancer treatment in mid-2006, having not worked on any music for the previous year. Due to the recovery time following her cancer, X was the first album Minogue had consciously prepared for the recording of, having previously been engaged for much of her career in a routine of recording, releasing and promoting albums.

"In My Arms" was served as the album's second single worldwide, while it was the third single in the United Kingdom, Australia and New Zealand. Because of this, the aftermath single was "Wow", which was the second single in those countries. However, because "In My Arms" was not released in North America, "Wow" was then served as the only club single in that country as they wanted "All I See" as the first mainstream single in North America. However, after the release, it was unsuccessful in the charts. It is also noted that "In My Arms" was released one day before the single "Wow". Musically, "In My Arms" is a synthpop and dance-pop inspired song. It is Minogue's first single to be issued on 7-inch vinyl since 1997's "Some Kind of Bliss".

Minogue also featured foreign artists on the track in certain territories. EMI Music Taiwan announced on 15 October 2007 that Minogue had recorded a duet of the song with Taiwanese singer Jolin Tsai, which was included on the Asian edition of X released in November 2007. EMI Music asked Mexican singer-songwriter Aleks Syntek to record some vocals in Spanish for the song in early 2008. The song was first published through Syntek's official YouTube channel on 24 April 2008, and was later confirmed by EMI and the Mexican press that the song was indeed real and was set to be released to Mexican radio stations in the last week of April. It was later confirmed that the song would be included on Syntek's compilation album, Best of 1989–2009, released in Mexico in June 2008. A special Mexican edition of X was also planned for release in May, but it was then delayed to 26 August 2008.

== Music video ==
The music video for "In My Arms" was directed by Melina Matsoukas and filmed in Los Angeles, California, along with the video for "Wow". There are five main sequences: the first features Minogue dressed in a crimson and white-chequered outfit, designed by Gareth Pugh with futuristic sunglasses; the second has Minogue singing into a microphone, on a blue recording room; the third scene is with a troupe of dancers; the fourth features Minogue in a yellow dress dancing in a pink box; and in the final scene she dances in front of a giant fan wearing a Dolce & Gabbana dress. As the video concludes, the five scenes are intercut and gradually fade. The video premiered on the Internet on 29 January 2008. It premiered on television stations across Europe on 31 January 2008. "In My Arms" is one of Minogue's highest viewed videos with over 20 million views on YouTube.

== Reception ==
=== Critical response ===
"In My Arms" garnered positive reviews from music critics. Tom Ewing in a review for Pitchfork compared the song to French electronic music duo Justice and wrote that Minogue "bounces around the tune with gusto". Prefix Magazine reviewer Bruce Scott described it as "fuzzed-out" and "synth heavy", and wrote that it was "full of the kind of exuberant charm that made a track like 'Love at First Sight' a past hit". According to Evan Sawdey from PopMatters, the song is "a track that absolutely demands your attention".

Mark Sutherland from Billboard gave a positive review, writing, "You'll search in vain for insight into her recent personal traumas, but there's still plenty of heart and soul [...] her best batch of tunes in a while." Peter Robinson from The Observer said about the song that "the high points are best viewed as four great tracks for her next greatest hits collection rather than any reflection of this album's cohesion." Jax Spike from About.com considered it as a sublime track "which flow evenly throughout and are definitely great songs to pass the time by at your favorite skating alley."

There were also some negative reviews. In a review for AllMusic, Christopher True was not impressed with "In My Arms" and called the song "cold, calculated dance-pop". Joan Anderman from The Boston Globe said that the song is an "icy dance-pop anthem." Dave Hughes from Slant Magazine, wrote, "the filmsy, nearly-punk Calvin Harris production 'In My Arms', which is essentially what a neon-orange feather boa would sound like if it were a song."

=== Chart performance ===
In Belgium, the track debuted on the Flemish singles chart at number thirty-three on 3 February 2008. The following week it rose to number fourteen. The track was also successful on Belgium's Walloon singles chart where it reached number eleven. "In My Arms" reached number eight in Greece and Germany—where it became Minogue's first top ten single since 2003's "Slow"—, as well as number ten in France on the physical chart and number two on the downloads chart, becoming her biggest hit in France since 2001's "Can't Get You Out of My Head". Elsewhere, the song reached the top spot in Romania, the top five in the Czech Republic and Turkey, the top ten in Slovakia and Switzerland, and the top twenty in Austria, Ireland, the Netherlands and Sweden.

The single entered the UK Singles Chart at number sixty-nine on downloads alone, peaking at number ten three weeks later. In Australia, "In My Arms" became Minogue's lowest-charting single in a decade (since 1998's "Cowboy Style"), peaking at number thirty-five and spending only two weeks in the top fifty. In the United States, though the song was not released officially, it received moderate airplay, charting on the American radio airplay chart in the first day of the plays at American radio.

== Live performances ==
Since the song was released, "In My Arms" has been performed at most of Minogue's tours bar the Anti Tour and the Golden Tour. In 2008, Minogue performed the song on her KylieX2008, promoting the album X. It was performed as the last song in the act entitled Black Versus White'. This was the fourth act in the Opening Night set order, which the song was followed by a performance of "Love at First Sight" which ended the act, the seventh in the Main Set and Open Air / Amphitheater sets and fifth in the Festival set, where "In My Arms" finished all three. Minogue then performed the song on her North American tour in later 2009. It was served as the last song of the sets until the encore. The song was most recently performed on Minogue's Aphrodite: Les Folies Tour in 2011. It was a more rock-oriented version of the song and was performed as the last song of the first half of the show. The song was performed after a remixed version of "Confide in Me" and a rock version of "Can't Get You Out of My Head". Minogue wore a big, open bottomed dress that was a turquoise colour with big silver platforms. Minogue also performed it on the Kiss Me Once Tour where it served as the second song after a performance of Les Sex. Exclusively on her São Paulo show in 2020, Minogue performed the song. During the Tension Tour in 2025, "In My Arms" was added to the setlist starting with the concert in Buenos Aires, where it was performed during the encore as the penultimate number.

== Track listings ==
Australian CD maxi-single

1. "In My Arms" – 3:32
2. "In My Arms" (Death Metal Disco Scene remix) – 5:43
3. "In My Arms" (Sébastien Léger mix) – 7:04
4. "Can't Get You Out of My Head" (Greg Kurstin remix) – 4:05

UK 2-track CD single, limited-edition 7-inch single and UK digital download 1

1. "In My Arms" – 3:32
2. "Can't Get You Out of My Head" (Greg Kurstin remix) – 4:05

UK CD maxi-single

1. "In My Arms" – 3:32
2. "In My Arms" (Death Metal Disco Scene remix) – 5:43
3. "In My Arms" (Sébastien Léger mix) – 7:04
4. "In My Arms" (video) – 3:30

UK digital download 2

1. "In My Arms" – 3:32
2. "In My Arms" (Chris Lake vocal mix) – 6:37
3. "In My Arms" (Sébastien Léger vocal mix) – 3:49
4. "In My Arms" (Steve Pitron & Max Sanna mix) – 6:43
5. "In My Arms" (Spitzer remix) – 3:33
6. "In My Arms" (Death Metal Disco Scene remix) – 5:43

European 2-track CD single

1. "In My Arms" – 3:32
2. "Cherry Bomb" – 4:16

European CD maxi-single

1. "In My Arms" – 3:32
2. "Do It Again" – 3:23
3. "Carried Away" – 3:15

European limited-edition 12-inch picture disc

A1. "In My Arms" – 3:32
B1. "In My Arms" (Spitzer remix) – 3:33
B2. "In My Arms" (Sébastien Léger remix) – 7:05

European digital download 1

1. "In My Arms" – 3:32
2. "Do It Again" – 3:23
3. "Carried Away" – 3:15
4. "Cherry Bomb" – 4:16

European digital download 2

1. "In My Arms" – 3:32
2. "In My Arms" (Spitzer remix) – 3:33
3. "In My Arms" (Chris Lake Vocal mix) – 6:37

European digital download 3

1. "In My Arms" – 3:32
2. "2 Hearts" (Mark Brown's Pacha Ibiza Upper Terrace mix) – 7:04

European digital download 4 – iTunes exclusive

1. "In My Arms" – 3:32
2. "2 Hearts" (Mark Brown's Pacha Ibiza Upper Terrace mix) – 7:04
3. "In My Arms" (video) – 3:32

Mexican digital download (remix)

1. "In My Arms" (feat. Aleks Syntek remix) – 3:32

== Personnel ==
Personnel are adapted from the X liner notes.

- Kylie Minogue – lead vocals
- Calvin Harris – producer
- Richard "Biff" Stannard – producer
- Geoff Pesche – mastering

== Charts ==
=== Weekly charts ===
Weekly chart performance for "In My Arms"
Chart (2008)	Peak position
Australia (ARIA)	35
Austria (Ö3 Austria Top 40)	16
Belgium (Ultratop 50 Flanders)	10
Belgium (Ultratop 50 Wallonia)	11
CIS Airplay (TopHit)	6
Czech Republic Airplay (ČNS IFPI)	2
Denmark (Tracklisten)	36
European Hot 100 Singles (Billboard)	15
France (SNEP)	10
Germany (GfK)	8
Global Dance Tracks (Billboard)	27
Hungary (Editors' Choice Top 40)	15
Ireland (IRMA)	15
Italy (FIMI)	34
Mexico Anglo (Monitor Latino)	2
Netherlands (Dutch Top 40)	20
Netherlands (Single Top 100)	33
Poland (Polish Airplay Chart)	1
Romania (Romanian Top 100)	1
Russia Airplay (TopHit)	5
Scottish Singles Sales (Official Charts)	2
Slovakia Airplay (ČNS IFPI)	6
Sweden (Sverigetopplistan)	15
Switzerland (Schweizer Hitparade)	10
Turkey Top 20 (Billboard)	2
Ukraine Airplay (TopHit)	18
UK Singles (Official Charts)	10

=== Year-end charts ===
Year-end chart performance for "In My Arms"
Chart (2008)	Position
Austria (Ö3 Austria Top 40)	74
Belgium (Ultratop 50 Flanders)	45
Belgium (Ultratop 50 Wallonia)	48
CIS Airplay (TopHit)	35
European Hot 100 Singles (Billboard)	71
France (SNEP)	82
Germany (Media Control GfK)	62
Netherlands (Dutch Top 40)	129
Russia Airplay (TopHit)	32
Switzerland (Schweizer Hitparade)	48
Ukraine Airplay (TopHit)	76
UK Singles (OCC)	193

=== Decade-end charts ===
Decade-end chart performance for "In My Arms"
Chart (2000–2009)	Position
Russia Airplay (TopHit)	160

== Release history ==
Release dates and formats for "In My Arms"
Region	Date	Format(s)	Label(s)	Ref.
Belgium	13 February 2008	CD	Capitol	
Germany	15 February 2008	12-inch vinyl; CD; digital download (EP) (Note: In Germany, "In My Arms" was made available as a digital EP in 3-track and 4-track editions.); maxi CD	EMI	
France	25 February 2008	CD	Capitol	
Australia	26 April 2008	Digital download (EP)	Warner Music Australia	
United Kingdom	2 May 2008	Digital download (EP)	Parlophone	
United Kingdom	5 May 2008	7-inch vinyl; CD; maxi CD	Parlophone	

== See also ==
- List of Romanian Top 100 number ones of the 2000s
