= Kylie Minogue products =

Alongside music-related releases, Australian singer and actress Kylie Minogue has released perfumes, books, furniture, clothing lines and wines.

== Perfumes ==
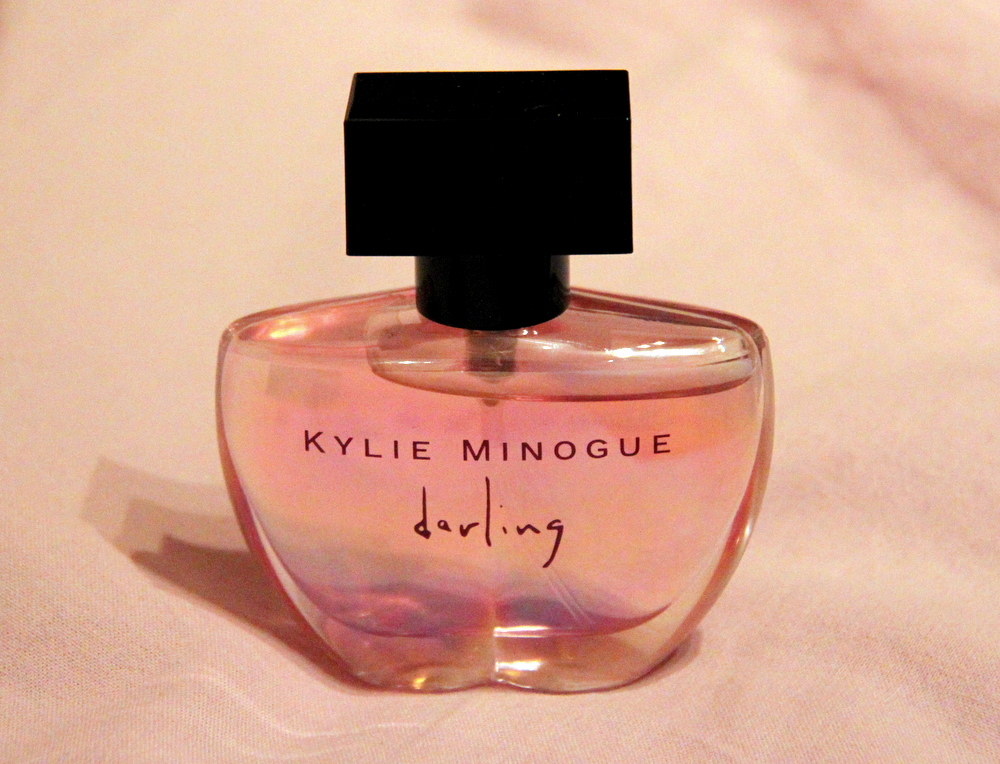
Kylie Minogue's debut perfume Darling

Kylie Minogue perfumes
Name	Year	Ref.
Darling	2006	
Sweet Darling	2007	
Sexy Darling	2007	
Showtime	2008	
Couture	2009	
Inverse for Men	2009	
Pink Sparkle	2010	
Pink Sparkle Pop	2011	
Dazzling Darling	2011	
Music Box	2012	
Darling	2021	
Disco Darling	2022	

In 2006, Minogue signed her first perfume endorsement deal with Coty. She launched her first fragrance Darling in November 2006. According to Thierry Wasser, she said she wanted to combine "strength and movement in order to reflect the intensity of my encounter with Kylie through this fragrance." With its design described as "glamorous, dynamic and heavy", it received generally favourable reviews from buyers. She launched the fragrance in Melbourne and Sydney and later released an EP titled Darling, a promotional release that came with the fragrance for free. In 2007, Sweet Darling and Sexy Darling were released.

In 2008, her fourth fragrance with Coty, Showtime was released. According to Minogue, she wanted a perfume that "could be a mirror of her personality" and described as her "second skin." In 2009, the fifth fragrance, Couture was released. According to Minogue, the name "Couture" was inspired by fashion. In 2009, her sixth fragrance Inverse For Men was released. It was Minogue's debut men's fragrance. The packaging is described as "glossy" and "sparkly", and both packaging is the same for each gender. Minogue's seventh fragrance, Pink Sparkle was released in 2010. According to Minogue, she wanted an "elegant, feel-good that takes you to a wonderful place of optimism and vitality." The bottle is designed as a champagne bottle, which the bottle top is designed as a corkscrew. In 2011, Dazzling Darling was released, responding back to the Darling range. Minogue stated that out of all her fragrance, she is comparing Dazzling Darling to herself, saying its "beautifully feminine and alluring" and that its "very soft and intimate."

In 2012, she released Music Box, which was a celebration fragrance as part of K25, an anniversary of her music career spanning for twenty-five years. The perfume was described as a "refined and sophisticated" fragrance. She was inspired by her fascination of music boxes when she was younger.

== Books ==
Kylie Minogue books
Name	Year	Ref.
Kylie	2000	
Kylie: La La La	2002	
The Showgirl Princess	2006	
K	2008	
Kylie / Fashion	2012	
Kylie Live	2019	

In 2000, Minogue's self-titled art book Kylie was published, featuring work and collaboration by her creative director, William Baker. In 2002, her sophomore book Kylie: La La La was released with a paperback edition was later released with additional photographs. In 2006, Minogue signed a deal with Puffin to release a children's book. Later that year, she released The Showgirl Princess. In 2008, Minogue commissioned a limited print of 1,000 copies of her book K, signed by her and her creative director, William Baker. In 2012, Minogue released her fifth book, Kylie / Fashion.

== Furniture ==
In 2008, Minogue launched Kylie at Home. The range was available online and retailers such as House of Fraser, Debenhams and British Home Stores. The range included curtains, bedding, pillows, towels, candles and lamp shades.

== Clothing ==
Minogue has released her own collection of clothing on her website. It includes shirts, pants, gloves and scarves. In 2003, she released her LoveKylie lingerie range, and later became the face of Agent Provocateur. In 2007, Minogue collaborated with H&M to launch a beachwear line. Demand outstripped supply and the collection sold out within weeks, becoming H&M's highest selling range ever.

== Wines ==
Minogue launched her range of wines, Kylie Minogue Wines in the US in 2022, including rosé prosecco, after selling five million bottles in two years in the United Kingdom. In 2022, it sold seven million bottles.

Kylie Minogue wines
Product	Ref.
Prosecco rosé	
Rosé Vin de France	
Sauvignon blanc	
Merlot	
Cava	
Côtes de Provence rosé	
Côtes de Provence cru classé rosé	
Chardonnay	
Pinot noir	
