= Kylie Minogue filmography =

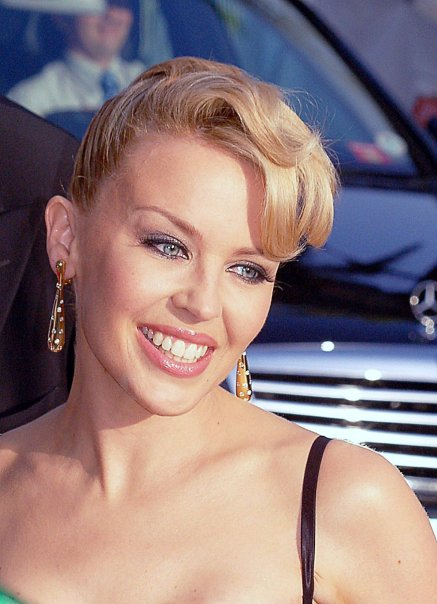
- Minogue at the 2007 Cannes Film Festival
- Film: 24
- Television series: 34
- Others: 3

Kylie Minogue has appeared in 24 films, 34 television series and 2 video games. Her film appearances include The Delinquents (1989), Street Fighter (1994), White Diamond (2007) and San Andreas (2015). Her television series appearances include Neighbours (1986–1988), The Henderson Kids (1985), The Vicar of Dibley (1994), Men Behaving Badly (1997), Doctor Who (2007), The Residence (2025) and Kylie (2026).

Minogue made her TV acting debut in the TV show The Sullivans in 1980 and went on to appear in Skyways that same year and The Henderson Kids in 1985. In 1986, she appeared in the TV show Fame and Misfortune, and in the same year starred in Neighbours alongside Jason Donovan. She made her film debut in 1989 in the film The Delinquents. She appeared in the TV show The Vicar of Dibley in 1994 and in the film Street Fighter alongside Jean-Claude Van Damme and in Bio-Dome alongside Stephen Baldwin. She appeared in Men Behaving Badly in 1997, and in 2007 she starred in Doctor Who and the documentary film White Diamond. In 2012, she appeared in Holy Motors and the Sky documentary film My Year as Aphrodite. In 2015, she had a cameo role in San Andreas and A Christmas Star, and also appeared in the TV show Young & Hungry in the same year. In 2016, she was a part in the TV show Galavant alongside Joshua Sash, in 2018, she starred in the Australian film Swinging Safari alongside Guy Pearce, and in 2025 appeared in the TV show The Residence. In May 2026, she starred in the Netflix TV show Kylie, which was based on her life and career and the Netflix documentary film Kylie: Tension Tour Live, chronicling her 2025 Tension World Tour. She is due to appear in the film Tangled Up in Blue alongside Quentin Tarantino in 2027.

== Films ==
Year	Title	Role	Notes
1989	The Delinquents	Lola Lovell	Film debut role
1994	Street Fighter	Sergeant Cammy White	
1995	Hayride to Hell	The Girl	Short film
1996	Misfit	Singer	Short film
1996	Bio-Dome	Dr. Petra von Kant	
1997	Diana & Me	Herself	Cameo appearance
2000	Cut	Hilary Jacobs	Cameo appearance
2000	Sample People	Jess	
2001	Moulin Rouge!	The Green Fairy	Cameo appearance
2005	The Magic Roundabout	Florence	Voice role UK and US dub
2006	Doogal	Florence	Voice role
2007	White Diamond	Herself	Documentary film
2009	Blue	Herself	Segment: "Chiggy Wiggy"
2009	Go Bananas!	Herself	Direct-to-video
2012	Holy Motors	Eva Grace	
2012	My Year as Aphrodite	Herself	Sky Documentary Film
2012	Jack & Diane	Tara	
2014	20,000 Days on Earth	Herself	Documentary
2015	San Andreas	Susan Riddick	
2016	A Christmas Star	Kylie	
2018	Swinging Safari	Kaye Hall	
2019	Mystify: Michael Hutchence	Herself	Documentary
2019	Dolly Parton: Here I Am	Herself	Documentary
2021	Back to the Outback	Susan	Voice role
2023	Ego: The Michael Gudinski Story	Herself	Documentary
TBA	Tangled Up in Blue	TBA	Filming
TBA	Bad Fairies	Clowder	Voice role; Filming

== Television ==
Year	Title	Role	Notes
1980	The Sullivans	Carla	8 episodes
1980	Skyways	Robin	Episode: "Kristy"
1983	Young Talent Time	Herself	Episode: "26/11/1983"
1985	The Henderson Kids	Charlotte "Char" Kernow	24 episodes
1985	Zoo Family	Yvonne	Episode: "Yvonne the Terrible"
1986	Fame and Misfortune	Samantha Collins	6 episodes
1986–1988, 2022	Neighbours	Charlene Robinson	363 episodes
1989	The Comedy Company	Rebecca	1 episode
1994	The Vicar of Dibley	Herself	Episode: "Community Spirit"
1997	Men Behaving Badly	Herself	Episode: "Comic Relief Special 1997"
2001	An Audience with Kylie Minogue	Herself	Kylie sings and interacts with a star studded audience in London.
2002	Saturday Night Live	Herself	Episode: "Ian McKellen/Kylie Minogue"
2004	Kath & Kim	Grown-up Epponnee-Rae Craig/Herself	Episode: "99% Fat Free"
2007	The Kylie Show	Herself	Kylie celebrates 20 years in music and the release of her album 'X'.
2007	Doctor Who	Astrid Peth	Episode: "Voyage of the Damned"
2009	The X Factor	Herself	Episode "Judges' Houses 1"
2009	Horne & Corden	Herself	Episode: "#1.5"
2012	Project Runway: All Stars	Herself	Episode: "An Unconventional Nightmare Before Christmas"
2012	The X Factor Australia	Herself	Episode: "Finale Part 1"
2013	Playhouse Presents	Bibbi	Episode: "Hey Diddly Dee"
2013	Styled to Rock	Herself	Episode: "Kylie Minogue's Look of the Future"
2014	The High Fructose Adventures of Annoying Orange	Herself	Episode: "Meet Banana Monocle"
2014	The Voice UK	Herself	Episode: "Blind Auditions 2"
2014	The Voice Australia	Herself	2 episodes
2015	Neighbours 30th: The Stars Reunite	Herself	Television special
2015	Young & Hungry	Shauna	Episodes: "Young & Moving" and "Young & Ferris Wheel"
2016	Galavant	Queen of the Enchanted Forest	Episode: "A New Season aka Suck It Cancellation Bear"
2018	The Voice UK	Herself	Episode: "Knockouts 1"
2022	Kylie at the BBC	Herself	A selection of Kylie's best performances at the BBC.
2023	Strife	Gwen Lewis	Episode: "A Good Cause"
2023	An Audience with Kylie	Herself	Kylie sings and interacts in front of a celebrity audience.
2025	The Residence	Herself	6 episodes
2025	KPopped	Herself	Episode: "Ateez"
2026	Kylie	Herself	3 episodes
2026	Kylie: Tension Tour Live	Herself	Documentary concert film
2026	Madonna & Graham	Herself	Madonna documentary film

== Video games ==
Year	Title	Role
1995	Street Fighter: The Movie	Sergeant Cammy White
2012	Kylie Sing and Dance	Herself

== Awards and nominations ==
Year	Award	Category	Work	Result
1987	Logie Awards	Most Popular New Talent	Neighbours	Nominated
1987	Logie Awards	Most Popular Actress	Neighbours	Won
1988	Logie Awards	Most Popular Actress	Neighbours	Won
1988	Logie Awards	Gold Logie	Neighbours	Won
2002	MTV Movie Awards	Best Cameo	Moulin Rouge!	Nominated
