= Aphrodite (song) =

2010 song by Kylie Minogue

Song by Kylie Minogue

from the album Aphrodite
- Studio: Electric Love (London, England)
- Genre: Dance-pop; disco
- Length: 3:45
- Label: Parlophone
- Songwriters: Andy Chatterley; Nerina Pallot
- Producers: Andy Chatterley; Nerina Pallot; Stuart Price

"Aphrodite" is a song by Australian recording artist Kylie Minogue, taken from her eleventh studio album of the same name (2010). Written and produced by Nerina Pallot and Andy Chatterley, the song was included as the title track on the album, which was released on 5 July 2010. It was later included in the track list of Minogue's seventh extended play, A Christmas Gift, which was released on 1 December 2010. The song is a dance-pop track in which Minogue personifies herself as Aphrodite, the Greek goddess of love, beauty, pleasure, and procreation.

Upon the album's release, "Aphrodite" was met with critical acclaim by most music critics, many of whom noted it to be one of the album's strongest tracks. Even though the song was not released as a single, it managed to peak at number six on the Ultratip chart in Belgium, and at number 25 on the Belgian Airplay chart. "Aphrodite" was a part of the setlist for Minogue's Aphrodite: Les Folies Tour in 2011, which was launched to promote its parent album. The song was performed as the concert tour's opening track.

== Background and composition ==
"Aphrodite" (2010)
19 second sample from "Aphrodite" containing its chorus. On the song, Minogue addresses herself as Aphrodite, the Greek goddess of love, beauty, pleasure, and procreation.

"Aphrodite" was written and produced by British singer-songwriter Nerina Pallot and her husband Andy Chatterley. The song was included in the track list of Minogue's eleventh studio album of the same name, which was released on 5 July 2010. Pallot and Chatterley also collaborated with Minogue on the song "Better than Today", which was released as the third single off the album. Pallot commented about working with Minogue, saying that "I feel very lucky that I've fallen on my feet like this. She's really accommodating and lovely and approachable and normal." "Aphrodite" was also included on Minogue's seventh extended play A Christmas Gift alongside the songs "Can't Beat the Feeling" and "Santa Baby". The extended play was released on 1 December 2010.

Musically, "Aphrodite" is a '90s-influenced dance-pop and disco song which features a "foot-stomping" beat and "military drummed" instrumentation, similar to that of a marching band. Stuart Price likened the song to Janet Jackson for its "'Rhythm Nation'-esque qualities." The song is penned like a dance anthem through which Minogue "brags" about her sexual prowess; she warns that she is not a person meant to be confronted and angered, as heard in the lines "I'm fierce and I'm feeling mighty/Don't you mess with me, you don't wanna fight me".

== Reception ==
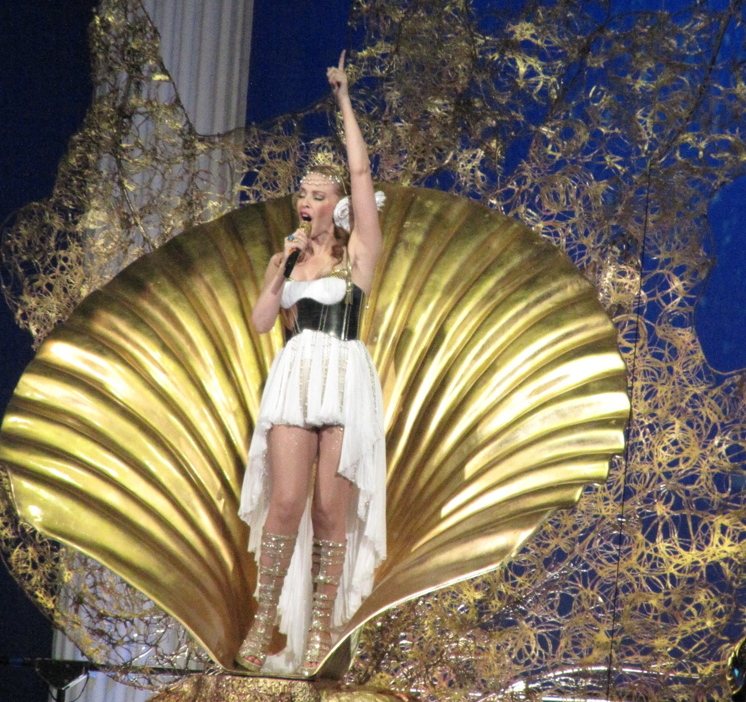
Minogue performing "Aphrodite" as the opening number of her Aphrodite: Les Folies Tour

Critically, the song was acclaimed by music critics. Ian Wade from BBC Music predicted that the song would be the "moment of her (Minogue's) live set when she actually explodes". Kitty Empire from The Observer praised the song's production, noting that Minogue's "core levels of piffle are magically transcended by the combined forces of stereo panning and chutzpah". Bradley Stern from MuuMuse felt that it was one of the album's strongest tracks along with "Get Outta My Way", and that Minogue "wears her sass well" on the song. Ben Norman from About.com found the song a "bit confused, both in subject and execution", but termed it as an "entertaining track" nonetheless. Tim Sendra from AllMusic described the song as a "thumping" track which contributes "some sass" to the album and picked it as a highlight. Priya Elan from NME mentioned the song as a highlight on the album too. Robbie Daw from Idolator felt that the song would have been a better choice to release as a single rather than "Better than Today".

"Aphrodite" debuted at number 42 on the Ultratip chart in the Dutch-speaking Flanders region of Belgium, on 12 February 2011. On 26 March, it reached its peak and final position on the chart at number six, having spent a total of seven weeks on the chart. On the Belgian Airplay chart, the song debuted and peaked at number 25 on 12 March, and spent a total of two weeks on chart.

== Live performances ==
"Aphrodite" was included in the setlist of Minogue's 2011 Aphrodite: Les Folies Tour, which was launched to promote the album of the same name. Minogue commenced the concert shows by performing the title track. During the performance, she entered the stage surrounded by a large golden clamshell similar to the depiction of Venus, the Roman counterpart of Aphrodite, in Sandro Botticelli's 1486 painting The Birth of Venus. Hannah Spencer from Contactmusic.com reviewed the performance positively and praised Minogue's confident vocals, saying that "the opening track of Kylie's show proves that the 43-year old is well and truly back for more with distinctive yet secure vocals".

== Charts ==
Chart performance for "Aphrodite"
Chart (2011)	Peak position
Belgium (Ultratip Bubbling Under Flanders)	6
