= 12″ Masters – Essential Mixes =

2010 album by Kylie Minogue

12" Masters - Essential Mixes

Remix album by Kylie Minogue
- Released: 17 September 2010
- Recorded: 1993–1997
- Length: 68:51
- Label: Sony Music
- Producer: Kylie Minogue; Brothers in Rhythm; Jimmy Harry; James Dean Bradfield; Dave Eringa; David Ball; Trouser Enthusiasts; Quivver; Sash!; Justin Warfield; Todd Terry; Felix da Housecat; Ingo Vauk; Drizabone; Phillip Damien

Kylie Minogue chronology
Pink Sparkle (2010)	12" Masters - Essential Mixes (2010)	A Kylie Christmas (2010)

12" Masters – Essential Mixes (commonly referred to as simply Essential Mixes) is a remix album by Australian pop singer Kylie Minogue. It was released on 17 September 2010, by Sony Music Entertainment. The album contains remixes of tracks from her 1994 and 1998 studio albums: Kylie Minogue and Impossible Princess.

Remixers who contribute to the album include Felix da Housecat, Trouser Enthusiasts, Quivver, Sash!, Justin Warfield, and TNT. Brothers in Rhythm, who produced her album Impossible Princess, also remixed the track "Too Far".

== Track listing ==
12" Masters – Essential Mixes
No.	Title	Writer(s)	Producer(s)	Length
1.	"Confide in Me" (Phillip Damien Mix)	Steve Anderson; Dave Seaman; Edward Barton	Brothers in Rhythm; Phillip Damien	6:25
2.	"Put Yourself in My Place" (Driza-Bone Mix)	Jimmy Harry	Harry; Drizabone	4:47
3.	"Where Is the Feelin'" (Felix da Housecat Klubb Feelin Mix)	Wilf Smarties; Jayn Hanna	Brothers in Rhythm; Felix da Housecat	10:48
4.	"Did It Again" (Trouser Enthusiasts' Goddess of Contortion Mix)	Kylie Minogue; Anderson; Seaman	Brothers in Rhythm; Minogue; Trouser Enthusiasts	10:22
5.	"Some Kind of Bliss" (Quivver Mix)	Minogue; James Dean Bradfield; Sean Moore	Bradfield; Dave Eringa; Quivver	8:39
6.	"Breathe" (Sash! Club Mix)	Minogue; Dave Ball; Ingo Vauk	Minogue; Ball; Vauk; Sash!	5:20
7.	"Too Far" (Brothers in Rhythm Mix)	Minogue	Minogue; Brothers in Rhythm	10:21
8.	"Confide in Me" (Justin Warfield Mix)	Anderson; Seaman; Barton	Brothers in Rhythm; Justin Warfield	5:25
9.	"Breathe" (TNT's Club Mix)	Minogue; Ball; Vauk	Minogue; Ball; Vauk; Todd Terry	6:44
Total length:				68:51
