= A Kylie Christmas =

2010 extended play by Kylie Minogue

EP by Kylie Minogue
- Released: 30 November 2010
- Genres: Christmas; pop; dance-pop
- Length: 5:19
- Label: Parlophone

Kylie Minogue chronology
12″ Masters – Essential Mixes (2010)	A Kylie Christmas (2010)	Hits (2011)

A Kylie Christmas is the fifth extended play by Australian recording artist Kylie Minogue. It was released digitally on 30 November 2010 by Parlophone. Minogue's cover of the 1953 song "Santa Baby" first appeared as a B-side to her 2000 single "Please Stay". Minogue uploaded a music video of "Let It Snow" to her official YouTube channel on 10 December 2010.

Another EP called A Christmas Gift was released with songs from Minogue's eleventh studio album Aphrodite.

== Track listing ==
A Kylie Christmas
No.	Title	Writer(s)	Length
1.	"Let It Snow"	Sammy Cahn; Jule Styne	1:57
2.	"Santa Baby"	Joan Javits; Philip Springer; Tony Springer	3:22
Total length:			5:19

A Christmas Gift
No.	Title	Writer(s)	Length
1.	"Aphrodite"	Nerina Pallot; Andy Chatterley	3:47
2.	"Can't Beat the Feeling"	Hannah Robinson; Pascal Gabriel; Borge Fjordheim; Matt Prime; Richard X	4:10
3.	"Santa Baby"	Javits; P. Springer; T. Springer	3:23
Total length:			11:20

== Charts ==
A Kylie Christmas	Peak position
UK Singles Chart	188

Santa Baby	Peak position
UK Singles Chart	31

== Release history ==
Country	Date	Label	Format	Version
United Kingdom	30 November 2010	Parlophone	Digital download	A Kylie Christmas
United States	30 November 2010	Astralwerks	Digital download	A Kylie Christmas
United Kingdom	1 December 2010	Parlophone	Digital download	A Christmas Gift
Australia	12 December 2010	Mushroom Records	Digital download	A Kylie Christmas
New Zealand	12 December 2010	Mushroom Records	Digital download	A Kylie Christmas
