= Kylie Minogue Wines =

Celebrity wine brand by singer Kylie Minogue

- Founded: 2020
- Key people: Kylie Minogue; Paul Schaafsma
- Parent company: Benchmark Drinks
- Known for: Prosecco
- Varietals: Rosé, sauvignon blanc, merlot, cava, chardonnay, pinot noir
- Other products: Hampers, drinkware, biscuits, bottle openers
- Tasting: Open to public
- Website: www.kylieminoguewines.com

Kylie Minogue Wines is a wine brand developed by Australian singer Kylie Minogue, in collaboration with English beverages distributor Benchmark Drinks. Founded in 2020, Kylie Minogue Wines sells nine different varieties of wine produced in France, Italy, Australia, and Spain.

== Background ==
Minogue stated that she first appreciated wine when she travelled to France at the age of 21, with her boyfriend at the time, Australian musician Michael Hutchence of rock band INXS. Minogue first considered launching a wine brand in 2017, when she was recording her fourteenth studio album Golden (2018) in Nashville, Tennessee. Minogue developed her range of wines with Australian businessman Paul Schaafsma, CEO of English distributor Benchmark Drinks, who has also developed wines for other celebrities such as English musician Gary Barlow and Scottish chef Gordon Ramsay. The brand was launched on 28 May 2020, to coincide with Minogue's 52nd birthday.

Kylie Minogue Wines was introduced in the United States in June 2022. In celebration of the launch, Minogue held an intimate jazz performance at the Carlyle Hotel in New York City, a hotel which serves Minogue's wines in its restaurants and bars.

== Commercial reception ==
According to The Guardian, Kylie Minogue Wines' Prosecco Rosé generated GB£7.7 million in 2021, and was described as the United Kingdom's "top selling branded prosecco rosé". Additionally, it was reported that in September 2021, Minogue's prosecco rosé had become the number one branded prosecco in the UK according to Nielsen Holdings data.

== Varieties of wine ==
Kylie Minogue Wines currently sells the following varieties:

- Prosecco rosé, produced in Gambellara, Italy
- Rosé Vin de France, produced in Provence, France
- Sauvignon blanc, produced in Gascony, France
- Merlot, produced in Languedoc-Roussillon, France
- Cava, produced in Penedès, Spain
- Côtes de Provence rosé, produced in Provence, France
- Côtes de Provence cru classé rosé, produced in Provence, France
- Chardonnay, produced in Margaret River, Australia
- Pinot noir, produced in Yarra Valley, Australia

== Awards ==
- People's Choice Drinks Awards (People's Choice Wine Awards) 2025
- The Drinks Business Awards 2021: Best Launch of the Year – special commendation (Kylie Minogue Wines)
- Global Chardonnay Masters 2020 – gold medal (Margaret River Chardonnay)

== See also ==
- Australian wine
- Kylie Minogue products
- List of celebrities who own wineries and vineyards
