= Fame and Misfortune =

- Written by: John Jones
- Directed by: Karl Zwicky; Noel Price
- Starring: Myles Collins; Kylie Minogue; John Flaus; Ben Mendelsohn
- Composer: Kevin Hocking
- Country of origin: Australia
- Original language: English

Production
- Producer: Noel Price

Original release
- Network: ABC
- Release: 15 May – 19 June 1986

Fame and Misfortune is a 1986 Australian TV series for children about a boy trying to raise money for a piano. It is based on the book of the same name by John Jones.

== Cast ==
- Myles Collins as Tim Hardy
- John Flaus as Mr. Hardy
- Marie Redshaw as Mrs. Hardy
- Kylie Minogue as Samantha Hardy
- Olivia Ball as Tasha
- Ben Mendelsohn as John
- Peter Hosking as Bernie

== Reception ==
Marie McNamara writing in The Age’s Green Guide says: "The best thing Fame and Misfortune is the script by John Jones. It's lively and clever and the droll humor is very successful. The dialogue, especially between Sam and Tim, is downright cunning." In The Sun-Herald David Grant writes: "Fame and Misfortune is the supposed story of a 15-year-old boy's struggle to own his own piano, but his real challenge is to act his way through a mundane and drawn-out script" and he expresses concern over the show's use of "tawdry" language like "scumbag", "slime bucket". "drop kick" and "maggot". Barbara Hooks in The Age praises Jones's dialogue, saying: the series "deserves considerable success".
