= Kylie / Fashion =

2012 photo-book by Kylie Minogue

- Author: Kylie Minogue; William Baker
- Language: English
- Subject: Kylie Minogue
- Genre: Fashion
- Publisher: Thames & Hudson
- Publication date: 12 November 2012
- Publication place: United Kingdom
- Media type: Print (hardcover)
- Pages: 224
- ISBN: 978-0-5005-1665-2

Kylie / Fashion is a 2012 photo-book by Australian singer Kylie Minogue and English fashion designer William Baker. It was released on 12 November 2012 by Thames & Hudson.

== Background ==
Kylie / Fashion highlights Minogue's 25 years in the music industry and collaborations with several fashion designers. The book showcases images of Minogue, as well as rare and unseen photos, video stills and sketches. The book was curated by William Baker, Minogue's creative director, and introduced by Jean Paul Gaultier, the book also features written texts by some of the most important designers and stylists Minogue has worked with throughout her career, including Domenico Dolce and Stefano Gabbana, Christian Louboutin, Julien Macdonald, Stella McCartney, Laudomia Pucci, make-up artist Kabuki and photographer Stéphane Sednaoui. Minogue added additional commentary and an afterword into the book.

According to Esquire magazine, the book is "crammed with high fashion images shot by elite photographers, a celebration of an international treasure, a woman loved for both her body of work and working her body".

== Details ==
The book's size is 32 cm × 24& cm. Its ISBN is 9780500516652. It has 346 illustrations, 269 in colour, spread across 224 pages. The images were reproduced by Rhapsody at their photography studio in Shoreditch, utilising the colour management techniques.
