= Sexy Darling (fragrance) =

Fragrance by Kylie Minogue
- Released: 2008
- Label: Coty
- Predecessor: Sweet Darling
- Successor: Showtime
- Website: http://www.kylieminogueparfums.com/sexy-darling/

Sexy Darling is a women's fragrance from Coty, and the third perfume to be endorsed by Kylie Minogue. Sexy Darling was created by Sophie Labbe.

== Scent ==
The scent contains the base of Darling with elements of blood orange, pear, pink pepper, red rose, belle de nuit, jasmine, sandalwood, and musk.
