= Darling (fragrance) =

Women's fragrance from Coty

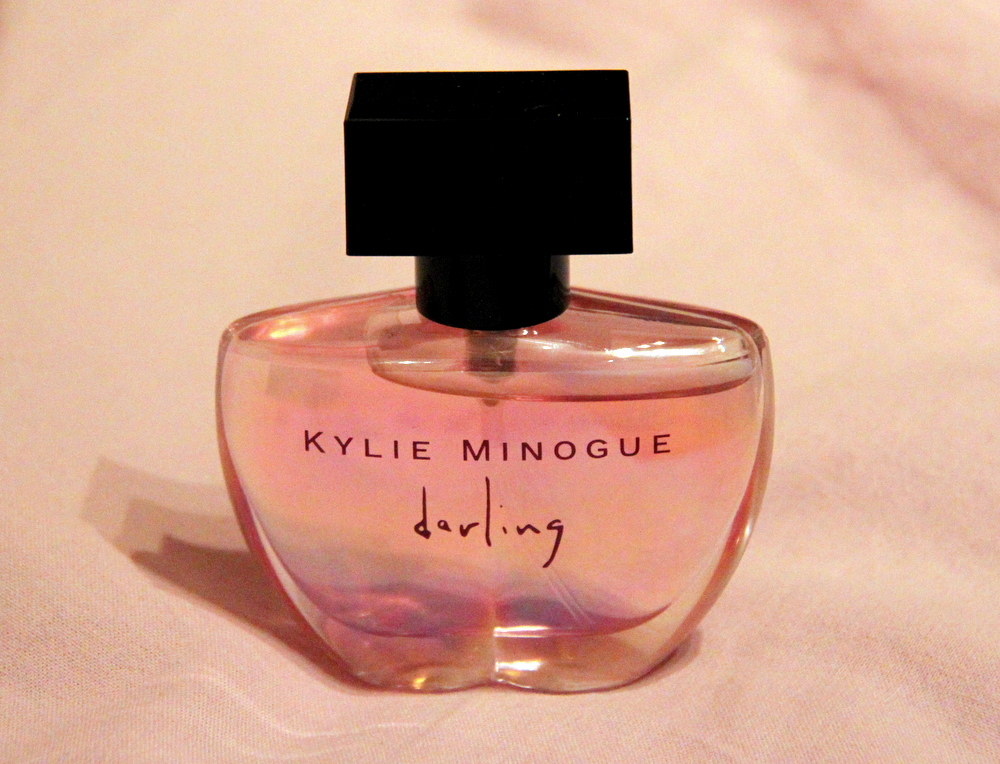

Fragrance by Kylie Minogue
- Released: 9 November 2006
- Label: Coty
- Successor: Sweet Darling

Darling is a women's fragrance from Coty, and the first perfume to be endorsed by Kylie Minogue, released on 9 November 2006. The perfume was designed by Thierry Wasser from Firmenich. Wasser wanted to create a perfume which reflects the Australian singer: the key notes are Australian sandalwood, star fruit, freesia and Boronia flower.

In 2021, Minogue relaunched Darling in Australia and Europe. The scent has been subtly updated by Firmenich perfumer Ilias Ermenidis, while the flacon and packaging have also been given a contemporary update.

== The following versions of Darling ==
In 2007 the successor of the perfume, Sweet Darling came into the markets. Having the base as its predecessor, cotton candy, patchouli and vanilla were added into the original substance. Sweet Darling was a limited edition, being available only in 2007. In 2008 the third version of Darling, Sexy Darling, was released. It was created by Sophie Labbe and it contains blood orange, pear, pink pepper, red rose, belle de nuit, jasmine, sandalwood and musk. In 2011 a new incarnation of Darling was released as Dazzling Darling.

== EP ==
Darling

EP by Kylie Minogue
- Released: 9 February 2007
- Genres: Pop, dance
- Label: Parlophone

Kylie Minogue chronology
Showgirl: Homecoming Live (2004)	Darling (2007)	Confide in Me: The Irresistible Kylie (2007)

Darling is a promotional EP by Australian singer Kylie Minogue. It was given out free at the launch of Minogue's perfume of the same name, at Harrods on 9 February 2007. It features two album tracks and three lives track from her 2005 Showgirl: The Greatest Hits Tour.

=== Track listing ===
No.	Title	Length
1.	"I Believe in You" (live)	3:24
2.	"In Your Eyes" (live)	3:08
3.	"Slow" (live)	3:20
4.	"Loving Days"	4:24
5.	"Burning Up"	3:59
