= Pink Sparkle =

Women's fragrance

Fragrance by Kylie Minogue
- Released: 2010
- Label: Coty, Inc.
- Tagline: "Find your inner sparkle."
- Predecessor: Inverse

Pink Sparkle is a women's fragrance from Coty, Inc., and is the seventh endorsed fragrance by Kylie Minogue. Pink Sparkle was released in 2010, two months before her eleventh studio album Aphrodite was released. According to Minogue, she wanted an "elegant, feel-good that takes you to a wonderful place of optimism and vitality." The bottle is designed as a champagne bottle, which the bottle top is designed as a corkscrew. She promoted the fragrance on The Paul O'Grady Show the same year. In 2011, her ninth fragrance Dazzling Darling was announced, responding back to the Darling range. Minogue stated that out of all her fragrance, she comparing Dazzling Darling to herself, saying its "beautifully feminine and alluring" and that its "very soft and intimate."

== Information ==
Pink Sparkle was released in 2010. It contains the scents of pink grapefruit, white peach, lily of the valley, tambac jasmine, champagne accord, gardenia, bourbon vanilla, musk, citrus mint, juicy tomato, and bourbon vetiver.

Pink Sparkle POP was released in early November 2011 for a limited period.

== Design ==
According to the official information, its curvy shape is actually reminiscent of a champagne glass. The box has a slow shaded pink, and contains gold sparkles for a "shimmering look". The base of it was inspired by champagne corks.

== Limited CD ==
Pink Sparkle

EP by Kylie Minogue
- Released: July 2010
- Genre: Dance pop
- Label: Parlophone

Kylie Minogue chronology
Aphrodite (2010)	Pink Sparkle (2010)	12″ Masters – Essential Mixes (2010)

Pink Sparkle is a promotional EP by Australian singer Kylie Minogue. It was given out free at the launch of Minogue's perfume of the same name in several shops in London in July 2010. It features one track from Minogue's eleventh studio album Aphrodite, the B-side of the single "All the Lovers", and three live tracks recorded in New York that were previously released on Minogue's live album Live in New York.

=== Track listing ===
No.	Title	Length
1.	"Can't Beat the Feeling"	4:10
2.	"Go Hard or Go Home"	3:43
3.	"Boombox" / "Can't Get You Out of My Head" (live in New York)	5:03
4.	"Speakerphone" (live in New York)	4:46
5.	"I Believe in You" (live in New York)	3:03
