= MTV Movie Award for Best Cameo =

This is a following list of the MTV Movie Award winners and nominees for Best Cameo. It was first introduced in 2001. After an absence of ten years, the award returned in 2014.

Year	Actor Movie	Nominated
2001	James Van Der Beek —Scary Movie	Andy Dick – Road Trip; Tom Green – Charlie's Angels; Ozzy Osbourne – Little Nicky; Bruce Springsteen – High Fidelity
2002	Snoop Dogg —Training Day	David Bowie – Zoolander; Dustin Diamond – Made; Charlton Heston – Planet of the Apes; Kylie Minogue – Moulin Rouge! Molly Ringwald – Not Another Teen Movie
2004	Simon Cowell —Scary Movie 3	Matt Damon – EuroTrip; Paul Michael Glaser and David Soul – Starsky and Hutch; John McEnroe – Anger Management; P!nk – Charlie's Angels: Full Throttle
2014	Rihanna —This Is the End	Amy Poehler and Tina Fey – Anchorman 2: The Legend Continues; Joan Rivers – Iron Man 3 Kanye West – Anchorman 2: The Legend Continues; Robert De Niro – American Hustle
