= Kylie (TV series) =

2026 documentary series

- Promotional poster
- Genre: Docu-series
- Directed by: Michael Harte
- Starring: Kylie Minogue
- Countries of origin: Australia; United Kingdom
- Original language: English
- No. of seasons: 1
- No. of episodes: 3

Production
- Producer: John Battsek
- Editor: Michael Harte
- Production company: Ventureland

Original release
- Network: Netflix
- Release: 20 May 2026

Kylie is a 2026 documentary series about Australian singer Kylie Minogue, directed by Michael Harte and produced by Ventureland for Netflix. The three-part series uses Minogue's personal archives, home movies, photographs, and new interviews to examine her life and career. It premiered on Netflix on 20 May 2026.

== Premise ==
Kylie is a three-part documentary series in which Kylie Minogue draws from her personal archives to reflect on her life and career. The series features home movie footage, personal photographs, and new interviews with Minogue herself, offering an intimate portrait of the artist beyond her public image. It explores her experiences navigating public scrutiny, personal loss, and health challenges, highlighting her resilience and the respect she has garnered across generations of fans and beyond.

== Cast ==
- Kylie Minogue
- Dannii Minogue
- Jason Donovan
- Pete Waterman
- Nick Cave

== Development ==
In June 2024, it was reported that Minogue had signed a deal with Netflix to produce a documentary about her music and acting career spanning nearly forty years. Reports have stated that other streaming services, including Apple TV and Disney+, were interested in producing the series; however, Netflix prevailed in the bidding war.

Minogue met producer John Battsek of Ventureland back in 2020, who proposed working on a documentary about her life. Although she was hesitant initially, Battsek managed to persuade her to do the project, insisting that it would be handled with care. According to her, "I felt like I had met the person to bring this to life and that I was at a good point in my life to take this leap of faith. I thought, ‘What am I scared of’ and once again, like so many other times in my career, I decided to go with my instinct and give it a try."

Irish director Michael Harte, who has previously produced the Beckham 2023 series for Netflix, was later assigned to the project. Subsequently, the three of them met at the Chateau Marmont hotel in Los Angeles, where they solidified the details. Although initially envisioned as a standalone film by Battsek, Harte re-worked the idea into a limited series format. On 7 January 2026, Netflix announced that a documentary about Minogue would be released on their platform later in 2026. Kylie was officially announced on 5 May alongside its trailer. The three episodes premiered on 20 May, alongside the concert film of the Tension Tour set to be debut one week later on 27 May.

== Critical reception ==
Kylie received critical praise from film critics. On Rotten Tomatoes, the series holds a 100% approval rating, based on 12 reviews.

Chitra Ramaswamy of The Guardian praised the series, giving it 4 out of 5 stars, and called it an "affecting, emotionally powerful portrait" that ultimately avoids the feel of a conventional celebrity memoir. Emma Brockes, also writing for The Guardian, stated that Kylie distinguished itself from recent celebrity documentaries and allowed Minogue to come across as recognizably human rather than as a tightly controlled brand. Annabel Nugent of The Independent wrote that the series “goes some way” toward exposing Minogue, who nevertheless remains mysterious. She also highlighted the documentary's treatment of her creative frustrations, tabloid derision, and relationships with Michael Hutchence and Nick Cave. Writing for the Los Angeles Times, Vivian Manning-Schaffel highlighted how Harte used home movies, personal photographs, and new interviews to outline Minogue’s movement from public sparkle to private resilience.

=== Accolades ===
Award	Date of ceremony	Category	Recipient	Result	Ref.
Dorian Awards	15 August 2026	Best TV Documentary or Documentary Series	Kylie (Netflix)	Nominated	
