= Vin de France =

Designation for table wine from France

Vin de France is a designation for table wine from France that has been in use since 2010, when it started to replace the former vin de table category. Vin de France wines may indicate grape variety (for example Chardonnay or Merlot) and vintage on the label, but are not labelled by region or appellation; they are labelled only as coming from France. This means that the wines are typically sold under brand names or as branded varietal wines.

== Position in the wine classification of France ==
Vin de France is the lowest level of three in the overhauled wine classification system of France, ranked below the intermediate category indication géographique protégée (IGP) and the highest category Appellation d'origine protégée (AOP). Unlike Vin de France, IGP and AOP wines indicate the wine's geographical origin within France. This system of three levels replaces the former system of four levels - vin de table, vin de pays, vin délimité de qualité supérieure (VDQS), and appellation d'origine contrôlée (AOC) - and was fully introduced by 2012.

== Background ==
The former vin de table category, which represented the simplest wines produced in France, had suffered from decreasing sales for several decades. These were simple everyday wines that were mainly produced in the south of France. This category had been very difficult to export in an increasingly competitive global wine market, especially since the wines were not allowed to carry a varietal designation or indicate vintage. This meant a distinct competitive disadvantage to New World wines and many other European wines in a similar price range. Simple varietal French wines instead had to use the vin de pays ("country wine") designation, which restricted the sourcing of grapes to the defined vin de pays regions, such as vin de Pays d'Oc from Languedoc-Roussillon. No French wine category existed that allowed a producer to source grapes from Languedoc-Roussillon, Rhône and Provence, but still sell the wine under a varietal designation.

As a result of the ongoing crisis in the French wine industry, Bernard Pomel was tasked with making proposals on how to remedy the situation. The Pomel report was presented to the French minister of agriculture on March 23, 2006, and proposed among other things a simplification of French wine classification, including the elimination the VDQS category, which was done in December 2007. At the same time, the European Union was considering reforms to the wine sector, aiming at reducing the need for subsidies. This also implied reforms of the European Union wine regulations, which went into effect on August 1, 2009. The reform included some liberalisation of the regulations surrounding the EU table wine category. Following that reform, France in 2009 decided to introduce the vin de France category as a replacement for vin de table. The introduction of the category took place in 2010.

== Reception ==
When the category was introduced, some commentators expected many French producers to start using the vin de France category instead of categories with geographical indications, in particular the IGP (formerly vin de pays) category. Some saw the vin de France category as more adapted to the needs of large wine companies rather than small producers.
