= Kylie Minogue =

Australian singer and actress (born 1968)

Kylie Minogue AO OBE
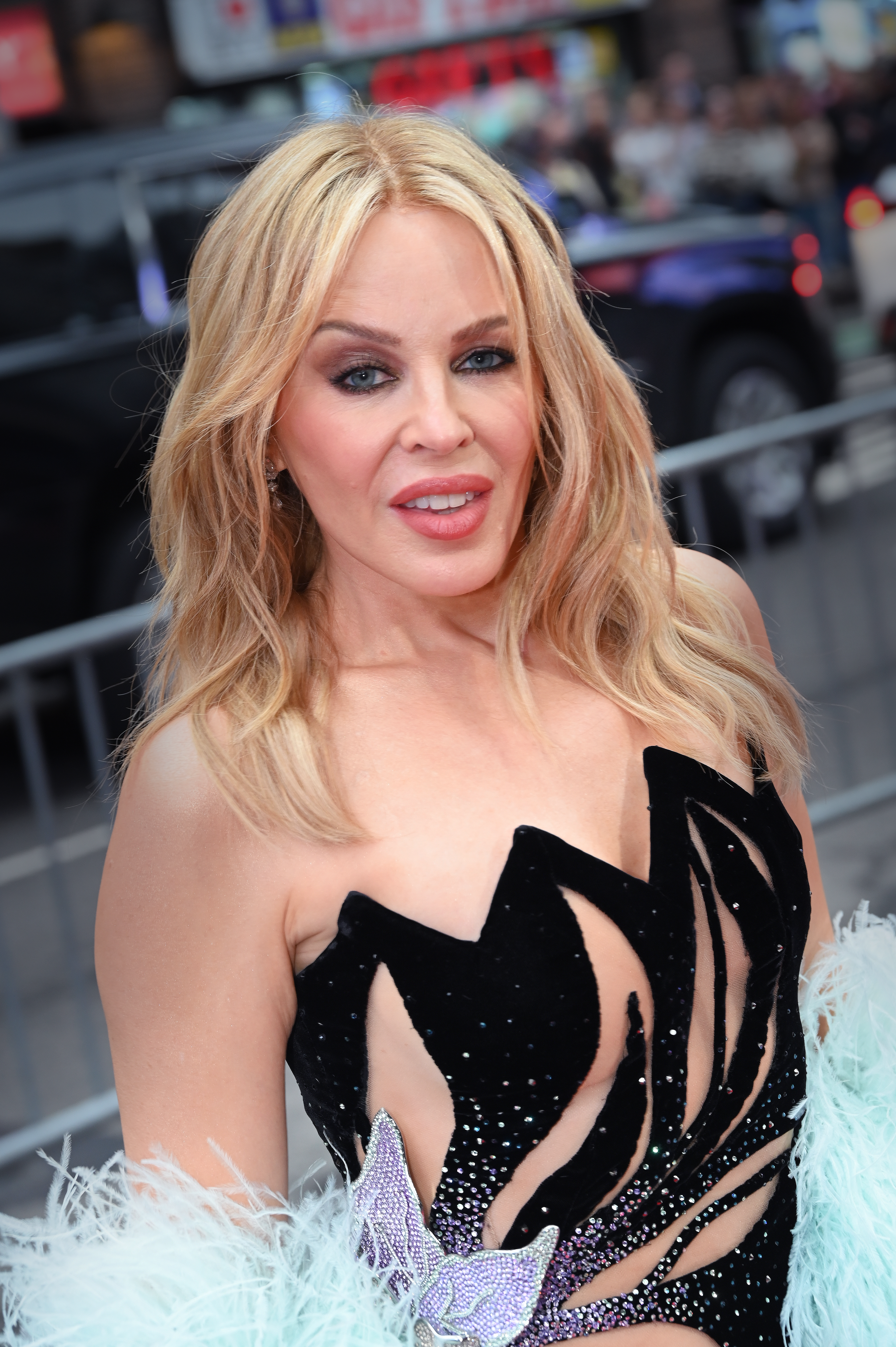
- Minogue in 2025
- Born: Kylie Ann Minogue; 28 May 1968 (age 58); Melbourne, Victoria, Australia
- Citizenship: Australia; United Kingdom
- Occupations: Singer; songwriter; actress
- Years active: 1979–present
- Works: Albums; singles; songs recorded; concert tours; filmography; videography; products
- Relatives: Dannii Minogue (sister)
- Awards: Full list
- Musical career
- Genres: Pop; dance-pop; disco
- Instrument: Vocals
- Labels: Astralwerks; BMG; Capitol; Deconstruction; Geffen; PWL; Mushroom; Parlophone; Warner
- Website: kylie.com

Kylie Ann Minogue (/mɪˈnoʊɡ/; born 28 May 1968) is an Australian singer, songwriter, and actress. Frequently referred to as the "Princess of Pop", she has achieved recognition in both the music industry and the fashion world as a major style icon. Her accolades include two Grammy Awards, four Brit Awards and eighteen ARIA Music Awards. Minogue is the highest-selling Australian-born female artist of all time, with sales surpassing 80 million records worldwide. Minogue received two Guinness World Records. In 2024, Time included her in its annual list of the 100 most influential people in the world.

Born and raised in Melbourne, Minogue first achieved recognition starring as Charlene Mitchell in the Australian soap opera Neighbours (1986–1988). She began her music career in the late 1980s, releasing four dance-pop studio albums under PWL. By the early 1990s, Minogue had amassed several hit singles in Australia and the UK, including "The Loco-Motion", "I Should Be So Lucky", "Especially for You", "Hand on Your Heart", and "Better the Devil You Know". Taking more creative control over her music, she signed with Deconstruction Records in 1993 and released the albums Kylie Minogue (1994) and Impossible Princess (1997).

By joining Parlophone in 1999, Minogue returned to mainstream dance-oriented music with Light Years (2000), including the number-one hits "Spinning Around" and "On a Night Like This". The follow-up, Fever (2001), was an international breakthrough for Minogue, becoming her best-selling album to date. The lead single, "Can't Get You Out of My Head", was a worldwide chart-topper and became one of the most successful singles of the 2000s, selling over twelve million units. Follow-up singles "In Your Eyes" and "Love at First Sight" became hits as well. She continued reinventing her image and experimenting with a range of genres on her subsequent albums, which spawned successful singles such as "Slow", "I Believe in You", "2 Hearts" and "All the Lovers". In 2017, she signed with BMG, leading to several number-one albums in Australia and the UK – Golden (2018), Step Back in Time: The Definitive Collection (2019), Disco (2020), Tension (2023) and Tension II (2024). She is the only female artist in the UK charts, with a number-one single in four decades and the first female to achieve chart-topping albums in five consecutive decades.

In film, Minogue made her debut in The Delinquents (1989), and appeared in Street Fighter (1994), Moulin Rouge! (2001), Holy Motors (2012) and San Andreas (2015). In reality television, she appeared as a judge on The Voice UK and The Voice Australia, both in 2014. Her other ventures include product endorsements, books, perfumes, charitable work and a wine brand. Minogue's achievements include being an ARIA Hall of Fame inductee, Officer of the Order of Australia (AO), Officer of the Order of the British Empire, Chevalier (knight) of the Ordre des Arts et des Lettres and an honorary Doctor of Health Science (D.H.Sc.).

== Life and career ==
=== 1968–1986: Early life and career beginnings ===
Kylie Ann Minogue was born at Bethlehem Hospital in Caulfield South, a suburb of Melbourne, Victoria, on 28 May 1968, to Carol Ann (née Jones), a former ballet dancer, and Ronald Charles Minogue, car company accountant. Her mother moved to Australia from Wales in 1958 as part of an assisted migration scheme on the ship Fairsea. Also aboard were the Gibb family of later Bee Gees fame. Minogue is of Irish, English and Welsh descent. She was named Kylie after the Nyungar word for "boomerang". She is the eldest of three children: her brother, Brendan Minogue, is a news cameraman in Australia, and her sister, Dannii Minogue, is an actress, singer and television host. The family frequently moved around various suburbs in Melbourne to sustain their living expenses, which Minogue found unsettling as a child. She often stayed at home reading, sewing, and learning to play violin and piano. When they moved to Surrey Hills, she went on to Camberwell High School. During her schooling years, she found it difficult to make friends. She got her HSC with subjects including Arts and Graphics and English. Minogue described herself as being of "average intelligence" and "quite modest" during her high school years. Growing up, she and her sister Dannii took singing and dancing lessons.

A 10-year-old Minogue accompanied Dannii to a hearing arranged by the sisters' aunt, Suzette, and, while producers found Dannii too young, Australian television producer Alan Hardy gave Minogue a minor role in soap opera The Sullivans (1979). She also appeared in another small role in soap opera Skyways (1980). In 1985, she was cast in one of the lead roles in the television series The Henderson Kids. Minogue took time off school to film The Henderson Kids and while Carol was not impressed, Minogue felt she needed the independence to make it into the entertainment industry. During filming, co-star Nadine Garner labelled Minogue "fragile" after producers yelled at her for forgetting her lines; she would often cry on set. Minogue was dropped from the second season of the show after Hardy felt the need for her character to be "written off". In retrospect, Hardy stated removing her from the show "turned out to be the best thing for her". Interested in following a career in music, Minogue made a demo tape for the producers of weekly music program Young Talent Time, which featured Dannii as a regular performer. Minogue gave her first television singing performance on the show in 1985, and was not invited to join the cast.

She was cast in the soap opera Neighbours in 1986, as Charlene Mitchell, a schoolgirl turned garage mechanic. The show achieved popularity in the UK and a story arc that created a romance between her character and the character played by Jason Donovan culminated in a wedding episode in 1987 that attracted an audience of 20 million viewers. She became the first person to win four Logie Awards in one year and was the youngest recipient of the "Gold Logie Award for Most Popular Personality on Australian Television", with the result determined by public vote.

=== 1987–1989: Kylie and Enjoy Yourself ===
During a Fitzroy Football Club benefit concert, Minogue performed "I Got You Babe" as a duet with fellow actor John Waters, and "The Loco-Motion" as an encore. Producer Greg Petherick arranged for Minogue to record a demo of the latter song, re-titled as "Locomotion". The demo was sent to the head of Mushroom Records Michael Gudinski, who decided to sign Minogue in early 1987 based on her popularity from Neighbours. The track was first recorded in big band style, and was later given a completely new backing track by producer Mike Duffy, inspired by the hi-NRG sound of English band Dead or Alive. "Locomotion" was released as her debut single in Australia on 13 July 1987, the week after the wedding episode of Neighbours premiered. The single became the best-selling single of the decade in Australia, according to the Kent Music Report.

The success of the single resulted in Minogue travelling to London to work with record producing trio Stock Aitken Waterman in September 1987. They knew little of Minogue and had forgotten she was arriving; as a result, they wrote "I Should Be So Lucky" while she waited outside the studio. The track was written and recorded in under 40 minutes. The song reached number one in Australia, Finland, Germany, Hong Kong, Israel, Switzerland and the UK. Although Minogue needed to be convinced to work with Stock Aitken Waterman again after feeling she'd been disrespected during her first recording session, more sessions with the producers occurred from February to April 1988 in London and Melbourne, where the singer was filming her last episodes for Neighbours. The trio ended up composing and producing all the tracks on the forthcoming album and produced a new version of "The Loco-Motion". Producer Pete Waterman justified the highly controversial decision to re-record the latter track by claiming Minogue's platinum-selling Australian version was poorly produced, but Mike Duffy instead blamed the decision on Waterman's alleged wish to claim the prestige and royalties from the track's placement on the soundtrack of the 1988 film Arthur 2: On the Rocks. Minogue's self-titled debut album, Kylie, was released in July 1988. The album is a collection of dance-oriented pop tunes and spent more than a year on the UK Albums Chart, including several weeks at number one, eventually becoming the best-selling album of the 1980s by a female artist. It went gold in the United States, while the single "The Locomotion" reached number three on the U.S. Billboard Hot 100 chart, and number one on the Canadian dance chart. The single "Got to Be Certain" became her third consecutive number one single in Australia. Later in the year, she left Neighbours to focus on her music career. She collaborated with Jason Donovan on the song "Especially for You" after "intense" demand for the duet from the public, media and retailers overcame her initial reservations. The single peaked at number one in the UK. By December 2014, it sold its one-millionth copy in the country. She was sometimes referred to as "the Singing Budgie" by her detractors over the coming years. In a review of the album Kylie for AllMusic, Chris True described the tunes as "standard, late-80s ... bubblegum", but added, "her cuteness makes these rather vapid tracks bearable". She received the ARIA Award for the year's highest-selling single. She won her second consecutive ARIA Award for the year's highest-selling single and received a "Special Achievement Award".

Minogue's second studio album, Enjoy Yourself, was released in October 1989. The album was number-one in the UK, and spawned the number-one singles in the country such as "Hand on Your Heart" and "Tears on My Pillow". In North America, it failed to sell well and she was dropped by American record label Geffen Records. Sal Cinquemani of Slant Magazine, stated "there isn't a lot to differentiate her second effort from its predecessor by repeating the sonic template of her debut album." In support of the album, she embarked on her concert tour, the Enjoy Yourself Tour in Europe, Asia and Australia in February 1990. Minogue's debut film, The Delinquents, was released in December 1989. The film received mixed reviews from critics and was popular with audiences. In the UK, it grossed more than £200,000, and in Australia, it was the fourth-highest-grossing local film of 1989 and the highest-grossing local film of 1990. From 1989 to 1991, Minogue dated Australian INXS frontman Michael Hutchence.

=== 1990–1992: Rhythm of Love, Let's Get to It and Greatest Hits ===
Unhappy with her level of creative input on her first two albums, Minogue worked with her manager Terry Blamey and her Australian label Mushroom Records to force a change in her relationship with SAW, and to push for a more mature sound. Minogue's third album, Rhythm of Love, was released in November 1990 and was described as "leaps and bounds more mature" than her previous albums by AllMusic's Chris True. The project contained more "sophisticated" themes and influences, with composer Mike Stock stating that "Shocked" was influenced by the writings of Virginia Woolf, and was meant to be evocative of "a trip". Despite exhibiting creative growth, the album did not match the commercial success of its predecessors, peaking at number nine in the UK. However, Blamey described the album as a "big success" that "made lots of money for PWL". Three of its singles – "Better the Devil You Know", "Step Back in Time" and "Shocked" – reached the top ten in Australia. In the UK, all four singles entered the top ten.

Entertainment Weekly's Ernest Macias observed that, by the third album, Minogue "presented a more mature and sexually-fuelled image". Macias also pointed out that the album "showcases the beginning of Minogue's career as a pop icon, propelled by her angelic vocals, sensual music videos, chic fashion, and distinct dance sound." Minogue's relationship with Australian musician-actor Michael Hutchence was also seen as part of her departure from her earlier persona. The making of the music video for "Better the Devil You Know" was the first time Minogue "felt part of the creative process". She said: "I wasn't in charge, but I had a voice. I'd bought some clothes on King's Road for the video. I saw a new way to express my point of view creatively." To promote the album, she embarked on the Rhythm of Love Tour in February 1991.

Minogue's fourth album, Let's Get to It, was released in October 1991. It peaked at number fifteen in the UK, making it her first album to fail to reach the top ten. The first single from the album, "Word Is Out", became her first one to miss the top ten in the UK. Subsequent singles "If You Were with Me Now", "Give Me Just a Little More Time" and "Finer Feelings" – all reached the top eleven. Nick Levine of Digital Spy labelled the album "lacking a moment of pure pop brilliance to match her [Minogue's] previously released singles." In support of the album, she embarked on the Let's Get to It Tour in October. She later expressed her opinion that Stock, Aitken and Waterman stifled her, saying, "I was very much a puppet in the beginning. I was blinkered by my record company. I was unable to look left or right."

Minogue's first best-of compilation album, titled Greatest Hits, was released in August 1992. Chris True of AllMusic called it "an excellent overview of the first half of Minogue's career." It reached number one in the UK and number three in Australia. The compilation's singles – "What Kind of Fool (Heard All That Before)" and a cover of Kool & the Gang's "Celebration", both peaked outside of the top ten in the UK. By the end of 1992, PWL did not renew their contract with Minogue, believing the singer "was [not] moving in a direction that was going to be successful".

=== 1993–1999: Kylie Minogue and Impossible Princess ===
Minogue's signing with British record label Deconstruction Records in 1993 marked a new phase in her career. Her fifth studio album, Kylie Minogue, was released in September 1994 and was a departure from her previous efforts as it "no longer featured the Stock-Aitken-Waterman production gloss", with critics noting Minogue's vocals and the album production. It was produced by dance music producers the Brothers in Rhythm, namely Dave Seaman and Steve Anderson, who had previously produced "Finer Feelings". As of 2015, Anderson continued to be Minogue's musical director. The album peaked at number four in the UK. Its lead single, "Confide in Me", spent four weeks at number one in Australia, and peaked at number two in the UK. The follow-up singles, "Put Yourself in My Place" and "Where Is the Feeling?", both reached the top twenty in the UK.

During this period, Minogue made a guest appearance as herself in an episode of the British sitcom, The Vicar of Dibley. Director Steven E. de Souza saw her cover photo in Australia's Who Magazine as one of "The 30 Most Beautiful People in the World" and offered her a role opposite Belgian actor Jean-Claude Van Damme in the film Street Fighter. The film was a moderate success, earning US$70 million in the U.S. box-office, and received "poor" reviews, with The Washington Post's Richard Harrington calling Minogue "the worst actress in the English-speaking world". She had an affair with Van Damme while shooting the film in Thailand. She had a minor role in the 1996 film Bio-Dome starring American actors Pauly Shore and Stephen Baldwin. She also appeared in the 1995 short film Hayride to Hell and in the 1997 film Diana & Me. In 1995, she collaborated with Australian artist Nick Cave for the song "Where the Wild Roses Grow". Cave had been interested in working with Minogue since hearing "Better the Devil You Know", saying it contained "one of pop music's most violent and distressing lyrics". The music video for the song was inspired by John Everett Millais's painting Ophelia (1851–52), and showed Minogue as the murdered woman, floating in a pond as a serpent swam over her body. The single received widespread attention in Europe, where it reached the top 10 in several countries, and reached number two in Australia. The song won ARIA Awards for "Song of the Year" and "Best Pop Release". Following concert appearances with Cave, Minogue recited the lyrics to "I Should Be So Lucky" as poetry in London's Royal Albert Hall.

By 1997, Minogue was in a relationship with French photographer Stéphane Sednaoui, who encouraged her to develop her creativity. Inspired by a mutual appreciation of Japanese culture, they created a visual combination of "geisha and manga superheroine" for the photographs taken for Minogue's sixth studio album, Impossible Princess, and the music video for "GBI (German Bold Italic)", her collaboration with Japanese musician Towa Tei. She drew inspiration from the music of artists such as Scottish singer Shirley Manson and American rock band Garbage, Icelandic singer Björk, British rapper Tricky and Irish rock band U2, and Japanese pop musicians such as Pizzicato Five and Towa Tei. The album featured collaborations with musicians including James Dean Bradfield and Sean Moore of the Welsh rock band Manic Street Preachers. It garnered some negative reviews upon its release in 1997, but would be cited as her "most personal" and "best" work in retrospective reviews. In 2003, Slant Magazine's Sal Cinquemani called it a "deeply personal effort" and "Minogue's best album to date", with the magazine later ranking it as her best album. Evan Sawdey, from PopMatters, described the album as "one of the most crazed, damn-near perfect dance-pop albums ever created" in a 2008 review. Mostly a dance album, she countered suggestions she was trying to become an indie artist.

Acknowledging Minogue had attempted to escape the perceptions of her that had developed during her early career, she commented she was ready to "forget the painful criticism" and "accept the past, embrace it, use it". The music video for "Did It Again" paid homage to her earlier "incarnations". Retitled Kylie Minogue in the UK following the death of Diana, Princess of Wales, it became the lowest-selling album of her career. At the end of the year, a campaign by Virgin Radio stated, "We've done something to improve Minogue's records: we've banned them." The lead single "Some Kind of Bliss" failed to reach the top twenty in the UK, whereas "Did It Again" reached the top fifteen in both the UK and Australia. In Australia, the album was a success and spent 35 weeks on the album chart. After the album's release, she was dropped by Deconstruction in 1998. Her Intimate and Live tour in 1998 was extended due to demand. She gave several live performances in Australia, including the 1998 Sydney Gay and Lesbian Mardi Gras, and the opening ceremonies of Melbourne's Crown Casino, and Sydney's Fox Studios in 1999 (where she performed Marilyn Monroe's "Diamonds Are a Girl's Best Friend") as well as a Christmas concert in Dili, East Timor, in association with the United Nations Peace-Keeping Forces. She performed a duet with the English synth-pop duo Pet Shop Boys' on their Nightlife album and spent several months in Barbados performing in William Shakespeare's The Tempest. She then appeared in the film Sample People and recorded a cover version of Russell Morris's "The Real Thing" for the soundtrack.

=== 2000–2002: Light Years and Fever ===
Minogue signed with German–British record label Parlophone in April, who wanted to re-establish Minogue as a pop artist. Her seventh studio album, Light Years, was released in September 2000. NME magazine called it a "fun, perfectly-formed" record, which saw Minogue "dropping her considerable concern for cool and bouncing back to her disco-pop roots". It was a commercial success, becoming her first number one album in her native Australia and charting at number two in the UK. The lead single, "Spinning Around", debuted atop the UK in July, making her the second artist to have a number-one single in three consecutive decades, after American singer-songwriter Madonna. Its accompanying video featured Minogue in revealing gold hotpants, which came to be regarded as a "trademark". Three other singles — "On a Night Like This", "Kids" with English singer Robbie Williams and "Please Stay" all peaked in the top ten in the UK, with the former becoming her sixth number-one in Australia.

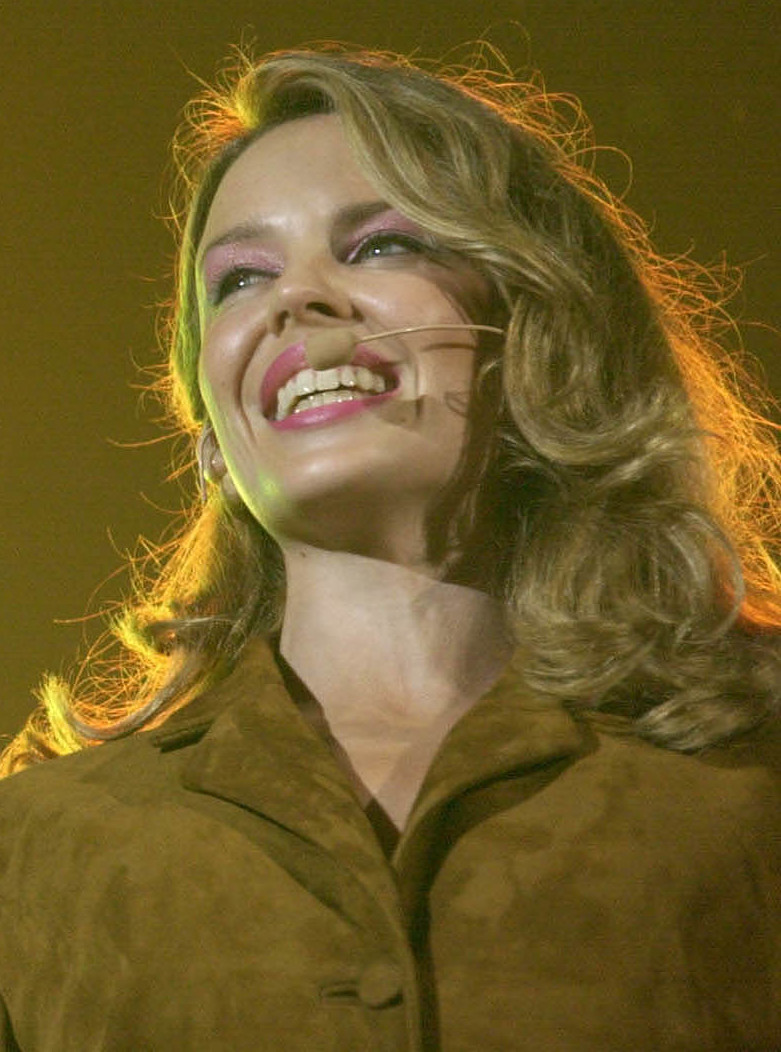
Minogue performing "Waltzing Matilda" at the opening ceremony of the 2000 Sydney Summer Paralympics

An elaborate art book titled Kylie, featuring contributions by Minogue and creative director William Baker, was published by Booth-Clibborn in March 2000. At the time, she began a romantic relationship with model James Gooding. Their relationship ended after two and a half years. In October, she performed at both the closing ceremonies of the 2000 Summer Olympics and in the opening ceremony of the Paralympics, all held in Sydney. Her performance of ABBA's "Dancing Queen" was chosen as one of the most memorable Olympic closing ceremony moments by Kate Samuelson of TNT. In March 2001, she embarked on the On a Night Like This Tour, which was inspired by the style of Broadway shows and the musicals of the 1930s. She also made a brief cameo as The Green Fairy in Baz Luhrmann's film, Moulin Rouge!. It earned her an MTV Movie Award nomination in 2002. "Spinning Around" and Light Years consecutively won the ARIA Award for Best Pop Release in 2000 and 2001.

In early 2001, she launched her own brand of underwear called Love Kylie in partnership with the Holeproof brand of Australian Pacific Brands.

In September 2001, Minogue released "Can't Get You Out of My Head", the lead single from her eighth studio album, Fever. It reached number one in over forty countries and sold twelve million copies, becoming her most successful single. The accompanying music video featured the singer sporting a hooded white jumpsuit with deep plunging neckline. The remaining singles — "In Your Eyes", "Love at First Sight" and "Come into My World" — all peaked in the top ten in Australia and the UK. The album was released in October and topped the charts in Australia, Austria, Germany, Ireland, and the UK, eventually achieving worldwide sales in excess of six million. Dominique Leone from Pitchfork complimented its simple and "comfortable" composition, terming it a "mature sound from a mature artist, and one that may very well re-establish Minogue for the VH1 generation". The warm reception towards the album led to its release in the U.S. in February 2002, through Capitol Records. Her first release in the U.S. in thirteen years led to her highest-charting album in the country, debuting at number three on the Billboard 200. On the Canadian Albums Chart, it peaked at number ten.

In April 2002, Minogue embarked on her KylieFever2002 tour in Europe and Australia, in support of the album. In the U.S., she performed several songs from the setlist in a series of KIIS-FM Jingle Ball concerts throughout 2002 and 2003. She received four accolades at the ARIA Music Awards of 2002, including Highest Selling Single and Single of the Year for "Can't Get You Out of My Head". That same year, she won her first Brit Award for International Female Solo Artist and Best International Album for Fever. She also performed a mashup of "Can't Get You Out of My Head" and New Order's "Blue Monday" at the show, which was named one of the "50 key events in the history of dance music" by The Guardian.

=== 2003–2006: Body Language, Ultimate Kylie and Showgirl ===
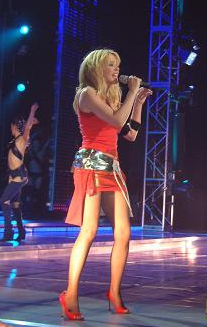
Minogue performing "Slow" during the Money Can't Buy concert show in 2003

In 2003, for the 45th Annual Grammy Awards, Minogue received her first Grammy nomination for Best Dance Recording for "Love at First Sight", before winning the award for "Come into My World" the following year. It marked the first time an Australian recording artist had won in a major category since Men at Work in 1983. She began a relationship with French actor Olivier Martinez after meeting him at the 2003 Grammy Awards ceremony. They ended their relationship in February 2007 and remained on friendly terms.

In November 2003, Minogue released her ninth studio album, Body Language, following an invitation-only concert titled Money Can't Buy, at the Hammersmith Apollo in London. The album downplayed the disco style and was inspired by 1980s artists such as Scritti Politti, the Human League, Adam and the Ants and Prince, blending their styles with elements of hip-hop. Andy Battaglia from The A.V. Club stated the album "shows Minogue as a surprisingly impressive presence in spurts, but she sounds better with her pleasure engine revving at full purr". The sales of the album were lower than anticipated after the success of Fever, peaking at number six in the UK. The album achieved first week sales of 43,000 and declined significantly in the second week. The lead single, "Slow", was a number one hit in Australia and the UK. In the U.S., it received a Grammy Award nomination in the Best Dance Recording category. Two more singles were released – "Red Blooded Woman" and "Chocolate", both charted within the top ten in the UK.

In November 2004, Minogue released her second greatest hits compilation album, Ultimate Kylie. It peaked at number five in Australia and number four in the UK. The Guardian included the compilation in their "1000 Albums You Must Hear Before You Die" list in 2007. The album yielded two singles: "I Believe in You" and "Giving You Up", which both entered the top ten in Australia and in the UK. "I Believe in You" was later nominated for a Grammy Award in the category of "Best Dance Recording". In the same month, she had a "prominent" guest star role in the season finale of the Australian sitcom Kath & Kim, playing a grown up Epponnee-Rae Craig.

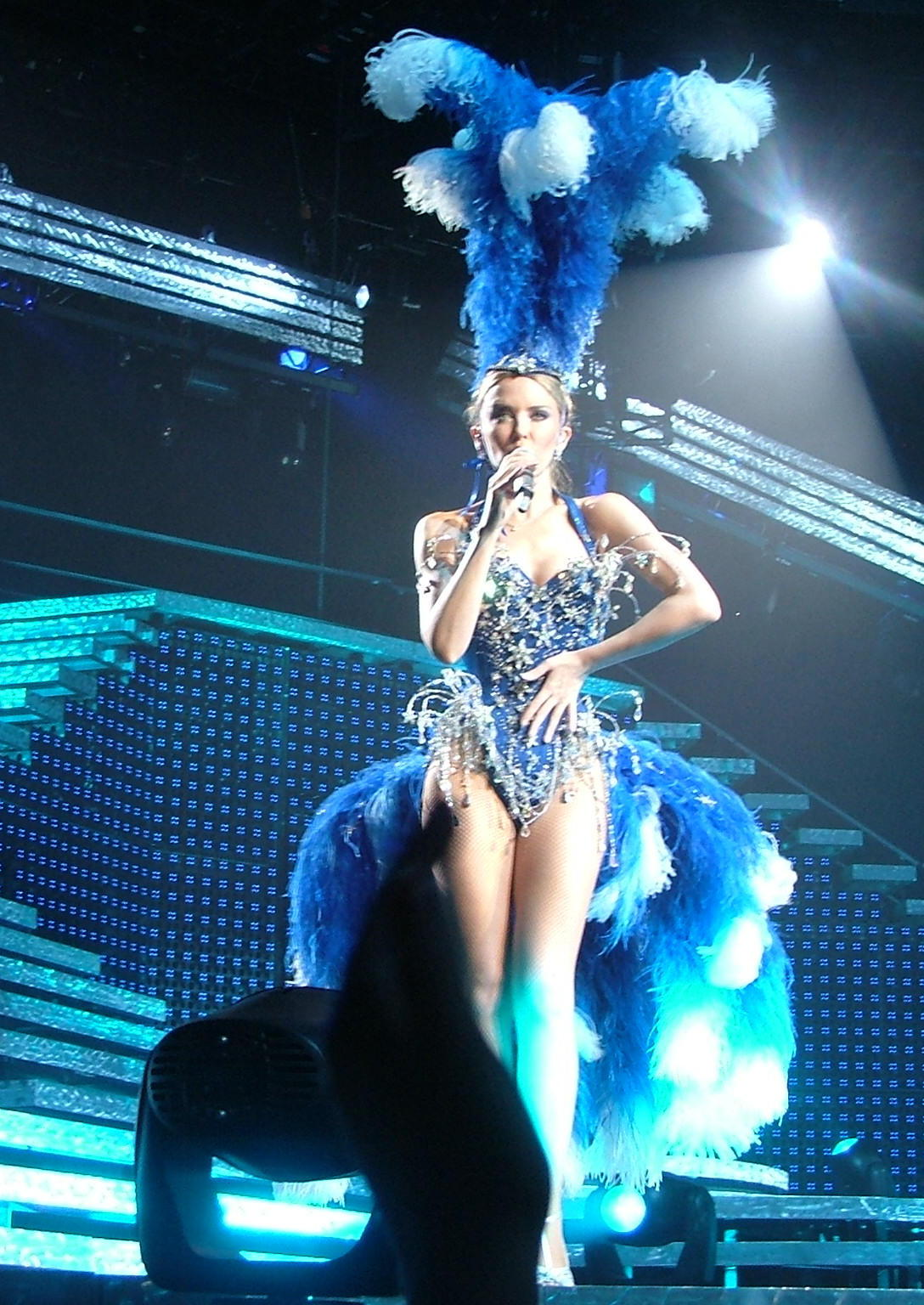
Minogue performing during Showgirl: The Greatest Hits Tour in 2005

In February 2005, the animated film The Magic Roundabout was released, in which she served as the voice actress for the role of Florence. She reprised the role in 2006 and recorded the theme song for the American edition, re-titled as Doogal. In March, Minogue commenced her Showgirl: The Greatest Hits Tour. It initially had tour dates in Europe, Australia, Asia and a headlining appearance in Glastonbury Festival announced. In May, she was diagnosed with breast cancer, forcing her to cancel the remainder of the tour. In the same month, she underwent surgery and commenced chemotherapy treatment soon after.

In January 2006, it was announced Minogue had finished chemotherapy and the disease "had no recurrence" after the surgery. She would continue her treatment for the next months. Her children's book, The Showgirl Princess, written during her period of convalescence, was published in October, and her perfume, Darling, was launched in November. The range was later augmented by eau de toilettes including Pink Sparkle, Couture and Inverse. She resumed her then cancelled tour in November, under the title Showgirl: Homecoming Tour. Her dance routines had been reworked to accommodate her medical condition, with slower costume changes and longer breaks between sections of the show to conserve her strength. The Sydney Morning Herald described the tour as an "extravaganza" and "nothing less than a triumph".

=== 2007–2011: X and Aphrodite ===
In October 2007, Minogue was featured in White Diamond: A Personal Portrait of Kylie Minogue, a documentary filmed during 2006 and 2007 as she embarked on her Showgirl: The Homecoming Tour. In November, her tenth studio and "comeback" album, X was released. The electro-styled album included contributions from British producer Guy Chambers, British singer-songwriter Cathy Dennis, Swedish production duo Bloodshy & Avant and Scottish DJ-producer Calvin Harris. Both the album and its lead single, "2 Hearts", entered at number one in Australia. The lead single and follow-up singles – "In My Arms" and "Wow", all peaked inside the top ten in the UK. In the U.S., the album was nominated at the 51st Annual Grammy Awards for Best Electronic/Dance Album, but lost to Daft Punk. She appeared on her own television special The Kylie Show, which featured music performances and comedy sketches. By December, she guest-starred in the British television series Doctor Who's Christmas special – "Voyage of the Damned" as Astrid Peth. 13.31 million viewers in the UK watched it, the series' highest viewing figure since 1979.

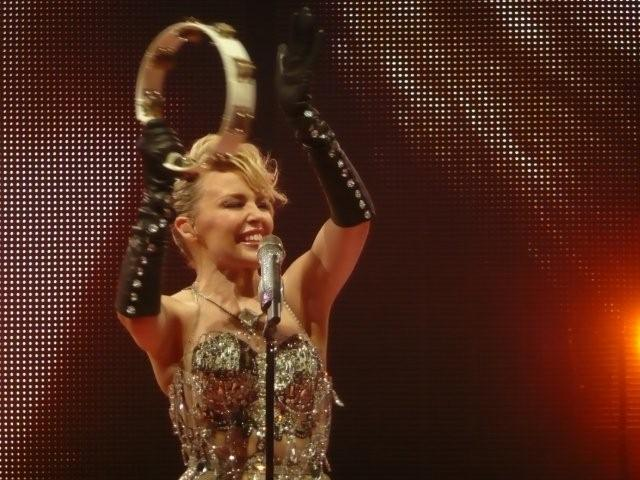
Minogue performing "No More Rain" on the KylieX2008 tour

In February 2008, Minogue launched her range of home furnishings, Kylie Minogue at Home. Her business venture later went on to launch its newest collection by February 2018, for its tenth anniversary. In May, she embarked on the KylieX2008 tour, her most expensive tour to date with production costs of £10 million. It was considered a success, with ticket sales estimated at US$70 million. She was then appointed a Chevalier of the French Ordre des Arts et des Lettres, the junior grade of France's highest cultural honour. In July, she was officially invested by the Prince of Wales as an Officer of the Order of the British Empire. She won the "Best International Female Solo Artist" award at the Brit Awards 2008. In September, she made her Middle East debut as the headline act at the opening of Atlantis, The Palm, a hotel resort in Dubai.

In January 2009, Minogue hosted the Brit Awards with English multi-hyphenates James Corden and Mathew Horne. She then embarked on the For You, for Me tour by September, her first concert tour in North America. In October, she was featured in the Hindi film, Blue, performing the song, "Chiggy Wiggy", from the soundtrack of the film.

In July 2010, Minogue released her eleventh studio album, Aphrodite. The album featured work from English record producer Stuart Price, Scottish DJ and record producer Calvin Harris, American musician Jake Shears, English singer-songwriter Nerina Pallot, Belgian musician Pascal Gabriel, Danish record producer Lucas Secon, English alternative rock band member Tim Rice-Oxley of Keane and British group Kish Mauve. Price served as an executive producer. Rob Sheffield from Rolling Stone labelled the album as Minogue's "finest work since 1997's Impossible Princess." Tim Sendra from AllMusic commended Minogue's choice of collaborators and producers, commenting it is the "work of someone who knows exactly what her skills are and who to hire to help showcase them to perfection." The album debuted at number-one in the UK. The lead single, "All the Lovers" peaked at number three in the UK. Subsequent singles from the album — "Get Outta My Way", "Better than Today" and "Put Your Hands Up (If You Feel Love)" followed. In November, she was featured on the single by the English singer Taio Cruz, "Higher". It entered the top ten in the UK by January of next year.

In February 2011, Minogue embarked on the Aphrodite: Les Folies Tour, performing in Europe, North America, Asia, Australia and Africa. With a stage set inspired by the "goddess of love" Aphrodite and Grecian culture and history, it was greeted with positive reviews from critics, who praised the concept and the stage production. The tour was a commercial success, grossing US$60 million.

=== 2012–2016: The Abbey Road Sessions, Kiss Me Once and Kylie Christmas ===
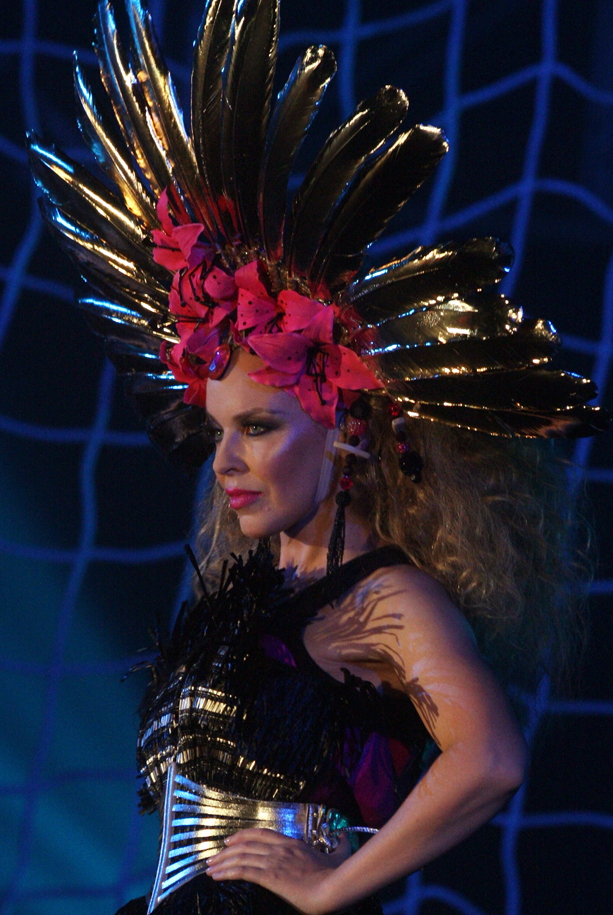
Minogue performing at the 2012 Sydney Gay and Lesbian Mardi Gras

In 2012, Minogue began a year-long celebration of her 25 years in the music industry, which was often called "K25". The anniversary started in March, with her embarking on the Anti Tour in England and Australia. The tour featured b-sides, demos and rarities from her music catalogue. The tour was positively received for its intimate atmosphere and was a commercial success. She released the single "Timebomb" in May and the greatest hits compilation album, The Best of Kylie Minogue in June. She performed at events such as Sydney Gay and Lesbian Mardi Gras, Elizabeth II's Diamond Jubilee Concert and BBC Proms in the Park London 2012. In October, she released the compilation album The Abbey Road Sessions, which contained reworked and orchestral versions of her previously released songs. It was recorded at London's Abbey Road Studios. It was produced by British record producer Steve Anderson and Colin Elliot. The album received favourable reviews from music critics. Andy Gill of The Independent called it "a more traditional makeover, an attempt to give a more elegant lustre to callow pop kitsch, usually by slowing the song down and loading on strings." It debuted at number two in the UK. In film, she has appeared in the American independent film Jack & Diane for a cameo role, and a lead role in the French film Holy Motors. Jack & Diane opened at the Tribeca Festival in April, while Holy Motors opened at the 2012 Cannes Film Festival in May.

In January 2013, Minogue parted ways with manager Terry Blamey, who managed her since the start of her singing career. The following month, she signed to entertainment agency Roc Nation for a management deal. In September, she was featured on Italian singer-songwriter Laura Pausini's single "Limpido", which was a number-one hit in Italy. In the same month, she was hired as a coach for the third series of BBC One's talent competition television show The Voice UK, alongside American record producer and the Black Eyed Peas member, will.i.am, English singer Ricky Wilson of Kaiser Chiefs and Welsh singer Tom Jones. The series opened with 9.35 million views in the UK, an increase from the previous series. It accumulated an estimated 8.10 million viewers on average. Ed Power from The Daily Telegraph commented on Minogue for being "glamorous, agreeably giggly [and] a card-carrying national treasure". In November, she was hired as a coach for the third season of Nine Network's The Voice Australia.

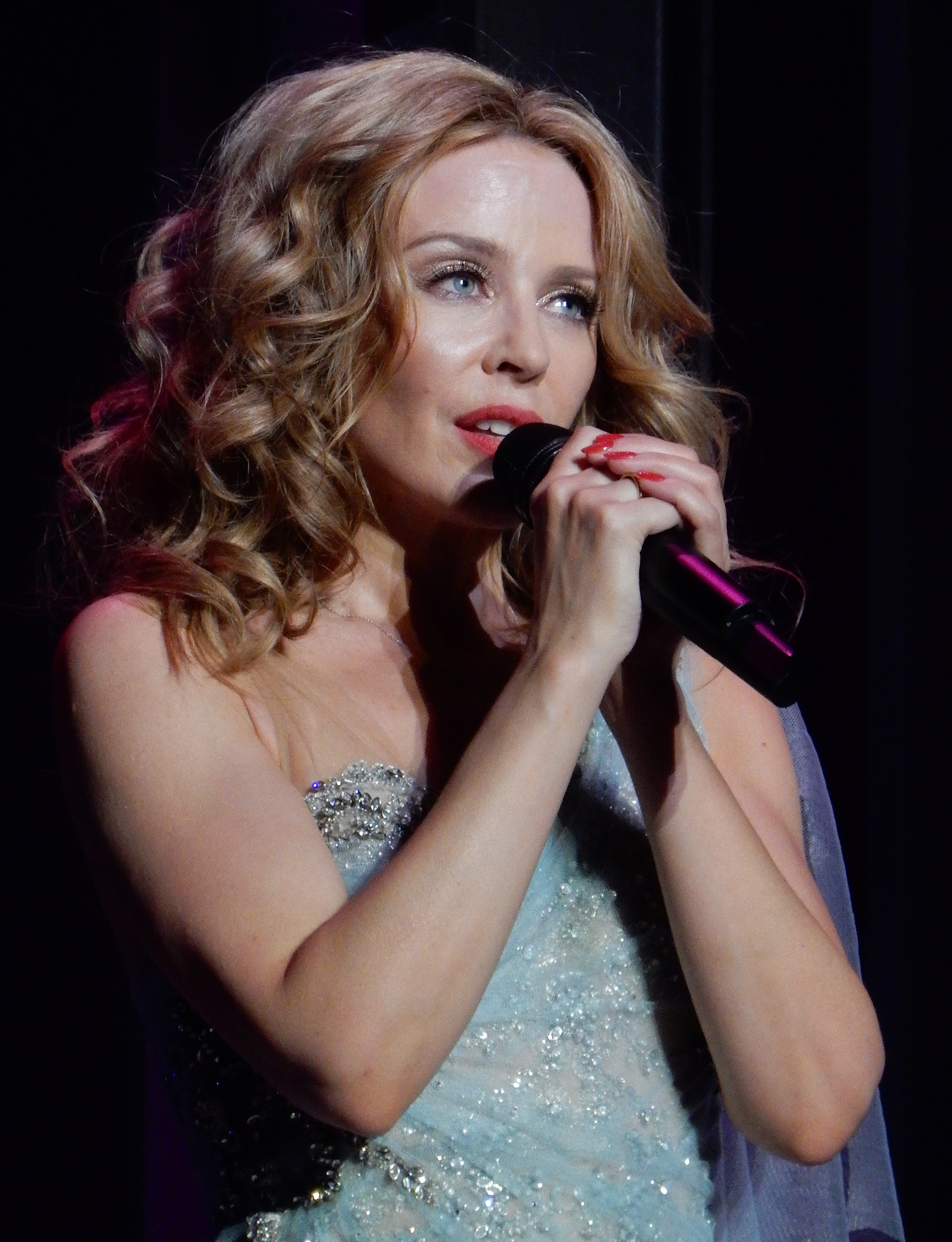
Minogue performing on her Kiss Me Once Tour in Manchester in 2014

In March 2014, Minogue released her twelfth studio album, Kiss Me Once. Kitty Empire from The Guardian described it "polished but kittenish... remains true to the effervescent dance-pop for which Minogue is known." The album peaked at number one in Australia and number two in the UK. Two singles were released, "Into the Blue" and "I Was Gonna Cancel". In August, she performed at the 2014 Commonwealth Games closing ceremony, donning a custom Jean Paul Gaultier corset. In September, she embarked on the Kiss Me Once Tour.

In March 2015, Minogue left Parlophone Records and Roc Nation. She entered into a trademark dispute with reality television personality Kylie Jenner, in Jenner's attempt to trademark the brand "Kylie", which Minogue has been trading under since the 1990s. The dispute was eventually resolved in Minogue's favour in 2017. In May, she appeared as Susan Riddick in the American film San Andreas, starring American actor Dwayne Johnson and American actress Carla Gugino. In September, an extended play with Mexican-American record producer Fernando Garibay titled Kylie + Garibay was released.

In November, Minogue released her thirteenth studio album and first Christmas album, Kylie Christmas. It features work from actress-singer-presenter Dannii Minogue, English musician Chris Martin of Coldplay and record producing team Stargate. The album missed the top ten in the UK. Lauren Murphy from The Irish Times commented on her review, "do we really need another pop star doing another bog-standard Christmas album with a sprinkling of festive cheese?... Minogue is better placed than most to do such an album, given her longevity in the business." The following year, it was re-released entitled as Kylie Christmas: Snow Queen Edition. A Christmas concert series in the Royal Albert Hall, London was held in both December 2015 and 2016, in support of the album. In 2016, she was engaged to British actor Joshua Sasse, with their relationship ending in 2017.

=== 2017–2021: Golden, Step Back in Time: The Definitive Collection and Disco ===
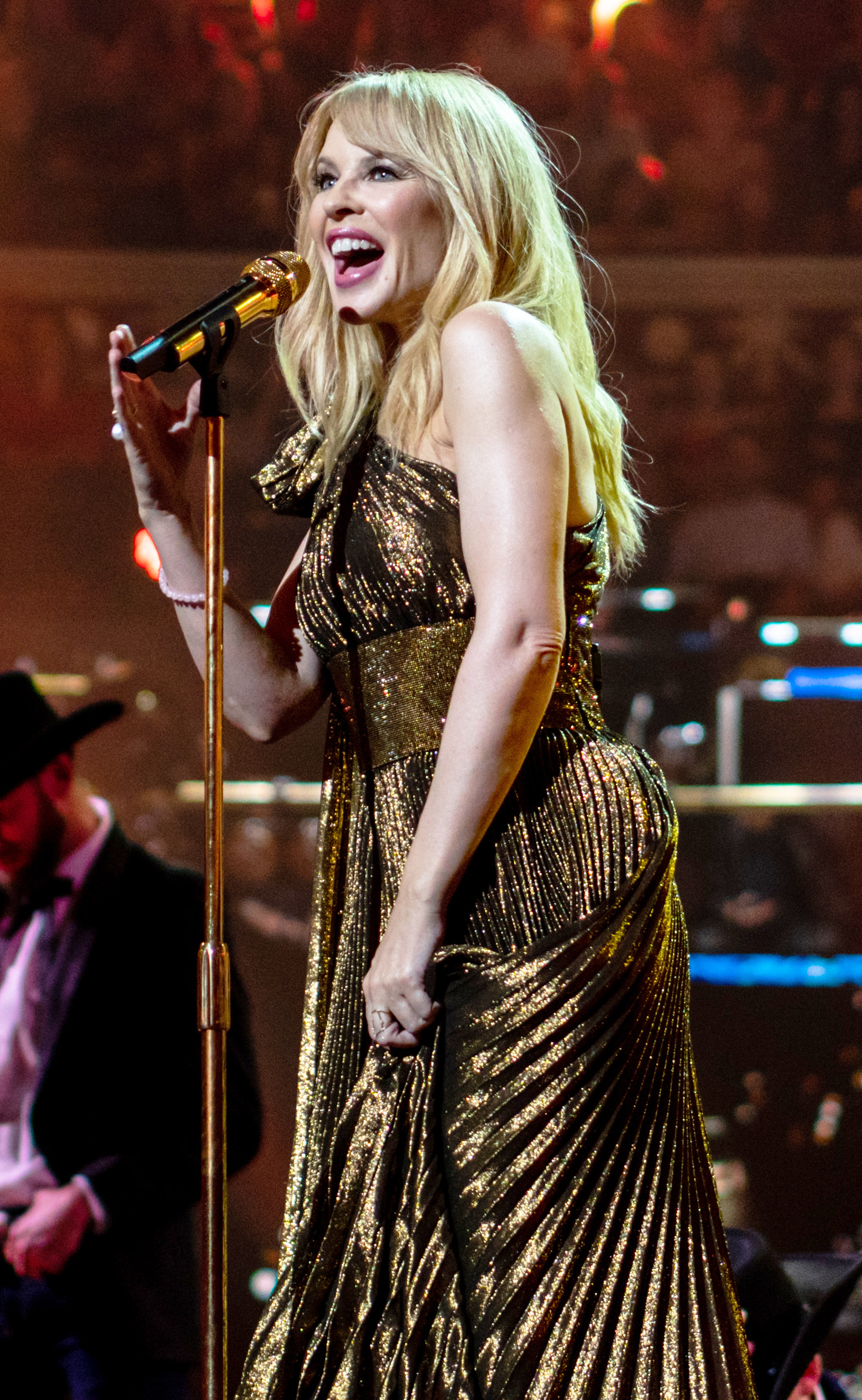
Minogue performing at the Royal Albert Hall for The Queen's Birthday Party, 2018

In February 2017, Minogue signed a record deal with BMG. In December 2017, she and BMG had struck a joint-deal with Mushroom Group — under the sub-division label, Liberator Music, to release her next album in Australia and New Zealand. Throughout 2017, she worked with writers and producers for her fourteenth studio album, including Nigerian-German record producer Sky Adams and British record-producer Richard Stannard. It was recorded in London, Los Angeles and Nashville, with the latter profoundly influencing the record.

The album Golden was released in April 2018, with "Dancing" serving as its lead single. It debuted at number one in Australia and in the UK. Tim Sendra from AllMusic labelled the album a "darn bold" for an artist of Minogue's longevity, stating "the amazing thing about the album, and about her, is that she pulls off the country as well as she's pulled off new wave, disco, electro, murder ballads, and everything else she's done in her long career." Pitchfork's Ben Cardew stated it "sounds like someone playing at country music, rather than someone who understands it." The album led several more singles such as "Stop Me from Falling", the title track "Golden", "A Lifetime to Repair" and "Music's Too Sad Without You" featuring English singer Jack Savoretti. In support of the album, she embarked on Kylie Presents Golden and Golden Tour. She was among the performers at The Queen's Birthday Party held at the Royal Albert Hall in April. In the same year, she began dating Paul Solomons, the creative director of British GQ. After five years, they split in February 2023.

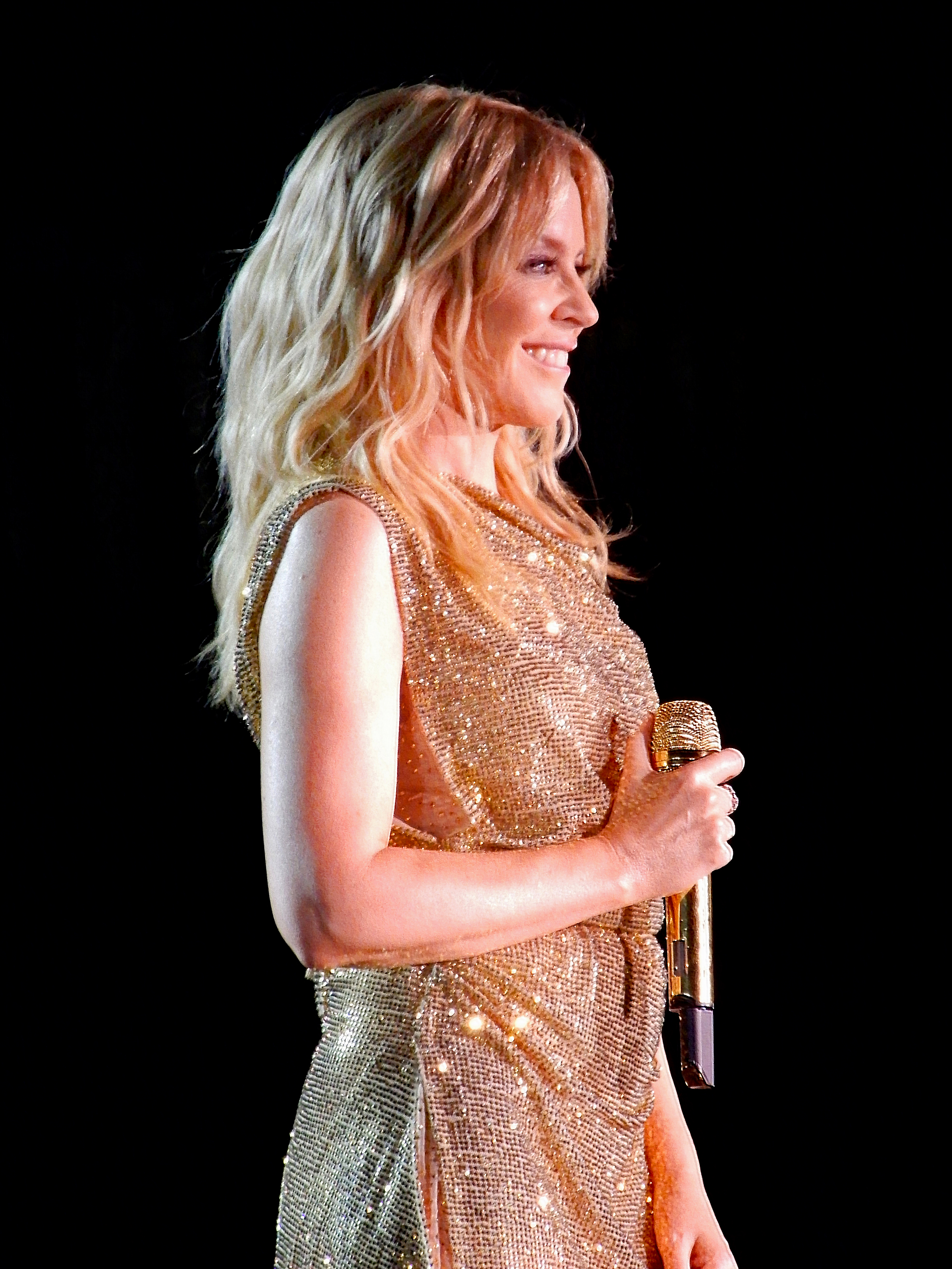
Minogue performing on her Summer 2019 tour

In June 2019, Minogue released the greatest hits compilation album Step Back in Time: The Definitive Collection, featuring "New York City" as the lead single. Tim Sendra of AllMusic complimented the collection describing it as a "truly definitive and essential for anyone who wants to look back on her [Minogue's] brilliant career." It was number one in Australia and in the UK. In the same month, she embarked on her Summer 2019 tour, which included her debut performance at the Glastonbury Festival – fourteen years after her breast cancer diagnosis forced her to cancel her 2005 headlining slot. Performing in the "Legends slot", her set featured appearances from Australian musician Nick Cave and English musician Chris Martin. The Guardian labeled it as "solid-gold, peerless and phenomenal". Her set was the most watched of the BBC coverage, earning three million viewers and setting a history record for the most attended Glastonbury set. By December, she appeared in her own Christmas television special, Kylie's Secret Night on Channel 4.

In May 2020, Minogue launched Kylie Minogue Wines in partnership with English beverages distributor Benchmark Drinks, with Rosé Vin de France serving as the debut product. Her prosecco rosé had become the number one branded prosecco in the UK, according to Nielsen Holdings data. The wine brand has sold over five million bottles by June 2022, and won a Golden Vines Award for entrepreneurship.

Following her Glastonbury performance, Minogue stated she would like to create a "disco-pop album" and return to recording new material after the performance. In 2020, work continued on her fifteenth studio album during the COVID-19 pandemic. Using a home studio to record throughout COVID-19 lockdowns, she also recorded and audio engineered her own vocals. The singles, "Say Something" and "Magic" were released in July and September respectively. In November, Disco was released, reaching number one in Australia and the UK. She became the only female artist to achieve a number one album in five consecutive decades, from the 1980s to the 2020s. In support of the album, a livestream concert titled Infinite Disco was held. Nick Levine of NME called the album her "most consistent and enjoyable album in a decade." In December, "Real Groove" was released as a single, with a subsequent remix featuring English singer Dua Lipa. The album was reissued in November 2021, titled Disco: Guest List Edition. It contained new tracks featuring British band Years & Years, English singer Jessie Ware and American singer Gloria Gaynor.

=== 2022–present: Tension and Tension II ===
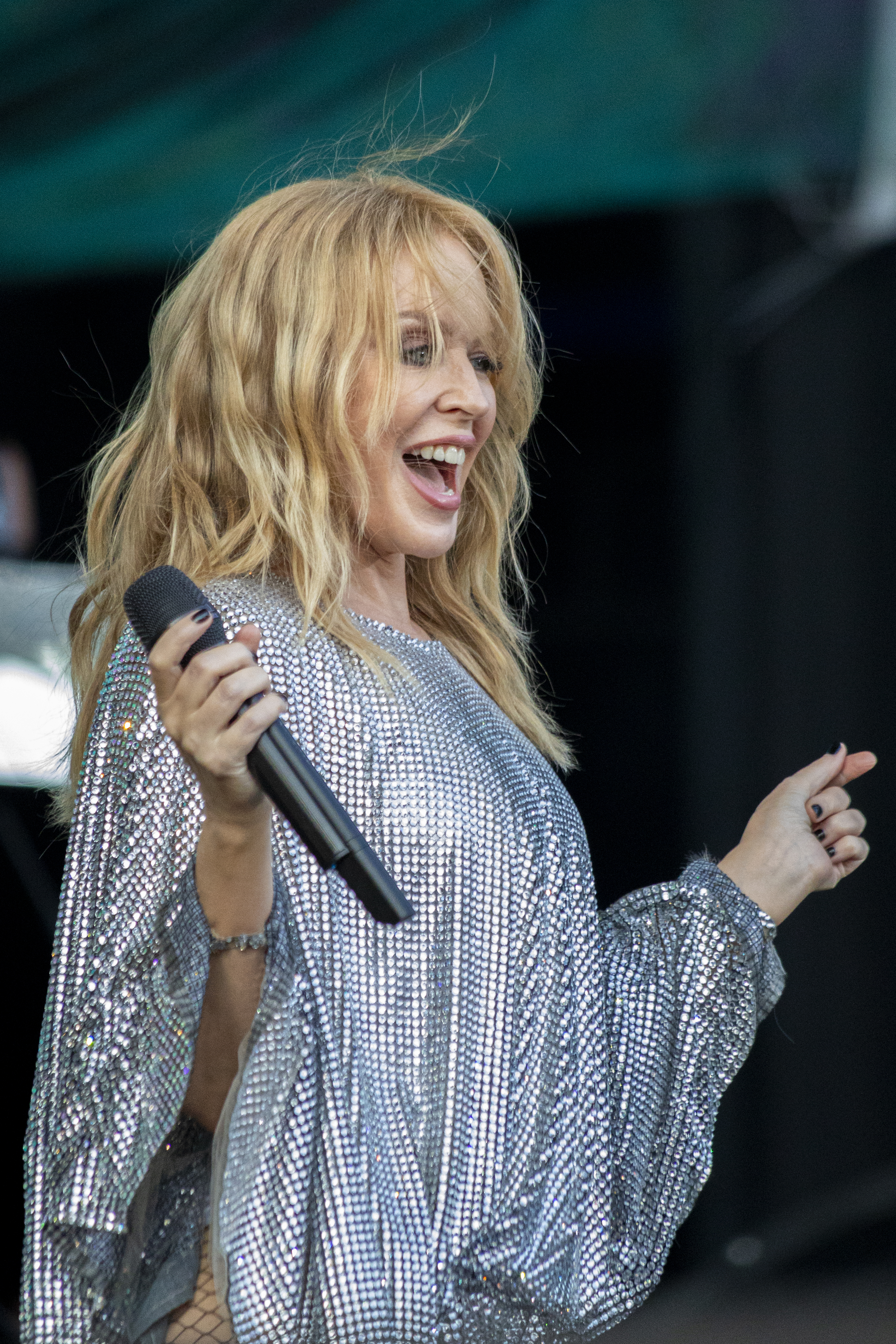
Minogue in Singapore, 2024

By 2022, Minogue began working for her sixteenth studio album. In February, after living in London since the 1990s, she relocated back to Melbourne, citing a desire to be closer to her family in Australia. In July, she returned to her role in Neighbours as Charlene, for a brief appearance for the show's intended series finale.

In May 2023, Minogue released the lead single "Padam Padam" from her sixteenth album Tension. The song entered the top ten in the United Kingdom and marked her as the only female artist to achieve a UK top ten entry in the 1980s to the 2020s. The single won an ARIA Award for Best Pop Release and a Grammy Award for Best Pop Dance Recording, becoming her second Grammy win after "Come into My World" in 2004. The album later released in September to critical acclaim. Featuring works from British record producer Lostboy, singer-songwriter Kamille, Dutch DJ Oliver Heldens, and previous collaborators Richard Stannard, Duck Blackwell, and Jon Green; Minogue described the album as "a blend of personal reflection, club abandon and melancholic high". Hannah Mylrea of Rolling Stone UK claimed it as "brilliantly good fun and soaring pop music, with a huge amount of heart that brings big emotions to the dancefloor, much like its creator." The album debuted at number one in Australia and the UK. The title track "Tension" and "Hold On to Now" both served as the follow up singles.

In November, Minogue embarked on a concert residency – More Than Just a Residency at Voltaire at The Venetian in Las Vegas, Nevada. The show sold out within minutes. Michael Idato of The Sydney Morning Herald said the show was "brief and a blast of Vegas high". In December, a television concert special, An Audience with Kylie filmed at the Royal Albert Hall, aired on ITV. Ateeqe Bhatti of Attitude gave her performance a good review, labeling Minogue as a "masterclass in stage performance".

In February 2024, Minogue signed with United Talent Agency for live representation in Canada and the U.S., as well for acting roles worldwide. In March, she received the Global Icon Award at the Brit Awards 2024, and performed a medley of her singles. In the same month, she also received Billboard Women in Music's Icon Award. She then performed with American singer Madonna for the 7 March concert of Madonna's The Celebration Tour. Minogue stated that it was a "long time coming", with Madonna describing Minogue as a "survivor and a fighter."

Minogue in Bangkok, 2025

Minogue released her seventeenth studio album, Tension II on 18 October 2024, with "Lights Camera Action" as the lead single. Serving as a "companion" to Tension, the album features collaborations with the Blessed Madonna, Diplo, Tove Lo, Orville Peck, Bebe Rexha and Sia. The album peaked at number one in Australia and the UK. Puah Ziwei of NME described the album as "tighter and bolder", claiming it "surpasses its predecessor and stands strong on its own".

In 2025, Minogue embarked on the Tension Tour on 15 February on Perth, Australia. Described as Minogue's "biggest tour since 2011" by Billboard, the tour would visit North America, South America, Europe, Asia and Australia. Sian Cain of The Guardian called the tour an "excursion to every Kylie Minogue era and a reminder of the many hits Minogue has produced." In March, the mystery drama television series – The Residence premiered on Netflix, featuring Minogue portraying herself as a musical guest. In December, the tenth anniversary edition of Minogue's studio album Kylie Christmas – Kylie Christmas (Fully Wrapped) was released and marked as Minogue's eleventh number-one album in the UK. The reissue's single, "XMAS" became both Minogue's eighth number-one single and her first Christmas number one single in the UK.

In 2026, a three-part documentary series titled Kylie, centered on Minogue's life, was released on the streaming service Netflix on 20 May. Directed by Michael Harte, it features interviews of herself, Nick Cave, Jason Donovan, Dannii Minogue and Pete Waterman. In August, the single "Love Sensation (Afterhours Mix)" with Madonna was released. It debuted at number eight on the UK singles chart and has been nominated for Best Remixed Recording at the 69th Annual Grammy Awards. In September 2026, Minogue headlined the pre-match performance at the Australian Football League Grand Final.

Minogue is set to appear in the film Tangled Up in Blue in 2027.

== Artistry ==
Minogue first became interested in pop music during her adolescence, stating "I first got into pop music in 1981, I'd say. It was all about Prince, Adam + the Ants, that whole New Romantic period. Before that, it was the Jackson 5, Donna Summer, and my dad's records – the Stones and Beatles." She would also listen to the records of Olivia Newton-John and ABBA. She said she "wanted to be" Newton-John while growing up. Her producer, Pete Waterman, recalled Minogue during the early years of her music career with the observation: "She was setting her sights on becoming the new Prince or Madonna ... What I found amazing was that she was outselling Madonna four to one, but still wanted to be her." Minogue came to prominence in the music scene as a bubblegum pop singer and was deemed a "product of the Stock Aitken Waterman Hit Factory". Australian musician Nick Cave, who worked with her, was a major influence on her artistic development. She told The Guardian: "He's definitely infiltrated my life in beautiful and profound ways." Throughout her career, her work was also influenced by Jamaican singer Grace Jones, British singer-songwriter-producer Cathy Dennis, British record producer D Mob, British band Scritti Politti, Icelandic singer-songwriter Björk, British rapper Tricky, Irish rock band U2 and Japanese pop band Pizzicato Five.

Minogue has been known for her soft soprano vocal range. Tim Sendra of AllMusic reviewed her album Aphrodite and said Minogue's "slightly nasal, girl next door vocals serve her needs perfectly." According to Fiona MacDonald from Madison magazine, Minogue "has never shied away from making some brave but questionable artistic decisions". In musical terms, Minogue has worked with many genres in pop and dance music. However, her signature music has been contemporary disco music. Her first studio albums with Stock, Aitken, and Waterman present a more bubblegum pop influence, with many critics comparing her to American singer-songwriter Madonna. Chris True from AllMusic, reviewed her debut album, Kylie and found her music "standard late-'80s Stock-Aitken-Waterman bubblegum", however he stated she presented the most personality of any 1980s recording artist. He said of her third album Rhythm of Love, from the early 1990s, "the songwriting is stronger, the production dynamic, and Kylie seems more confident vocally." At the time of her third studio album, "she began to trade in her cutesy, bubblegum pop image for a more mature one, and in turn, a more sexual one." Chris True stated during her relationship with Australian singer-actor Michael Hutchence, "her shedding of the near-virginal façade that dominated her first two albums, began to have an effect, not only on how the press and her fans treated her, but in the evolution of her music."

Her self-titled fifth studio album, primarily a dance-pop album integrating elements of R&B and adult contemporary music, saw a shift in her music. Chris True of AllMusic stated the album is a "remarkable change from Minogue's previous teen pop material" and the "start of a second phase" in her music career. From her work on her sixth studio album, Impossible Princess, her songwriting and musical content began to change. She was constantly writing down words, exploring the form and meaning of sentences. She had written lyrics before, but called them "safe, just neatly rhymed words, and that's that". Sal Cinquemani from Slant Magazine said the album bears a resemblance to Madonna's Ray of Light (1998). He said she took inspiration from "both the Britpop and electronica movements of the mid-'90s", saying "Impossible Princess is the work of an artist willing to take risks".

Her seventh studio album, Light Years is a disco-influenced dance-pop record, with AllMusic's Chris True calling it "arguably one of the best disco records since the '70s". True stated her eighth studio album, Fever, "combines the disco-diva comeback of Light Years with simple dance rhythms". Her ninth studio album, Body Language, was quite different from her musical experiments in the past as it was a "successful" attempt at broadening her sound with electro and hip-hop for instance. Incorporating styles of dance music with funk, disco and R&B, the album was listed on Q's "Best Albums of 2003".

Critics said Minogue's tenth studio album, X, did not feature enough "consistency", and Chris True called the tracks "cold, calculated dance-pop numbers." Tim Sendra of AllMusic said her eleventh album, Aphrodite, "rarely strays past sweet love songs or happy dance anthems" and "the main sound is the kind of glittery disco-pop that really is her strong suit." Sendra found Aphrodite "One of her best, in fact." Kiss Me Once, her twelfth studio album has been described by critics as her return to contemporary pop music.

Her fourteenth studio album, Golden was heavily influenced by country music, although maintaining her dance-pop sensibilities. Sal Cinquemani from Slant Magazine wrote "Golden further bolsters Minogue's reputation for taking risks—and artfully sets the stage for her inevitable disco comeback." For her fifteenth studio album, Disco, she began to audio engineer her own music due to the restrictions surrounding the COVID-19 pandemic.

== Public image ==
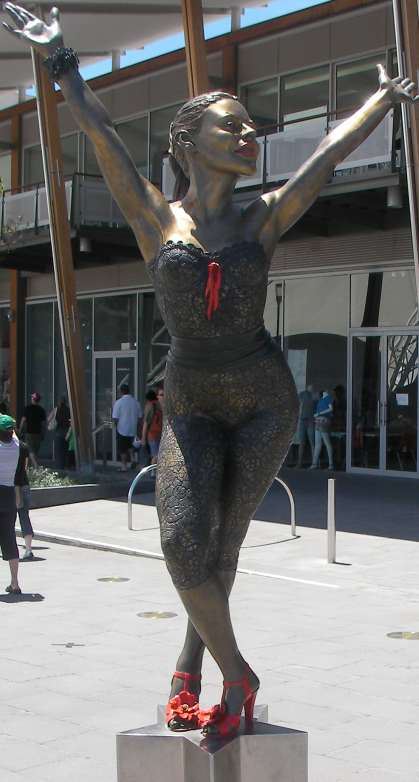
Bronze statue of Minogue at Waterfront City, Docklands, Melbourne (2009)

Minogue's efforts to be taken seriously as a recording artist were initially hindered by the perception she had not "paid her dues" and was no more than a pop star exploiting the image she had created during her stint on the soap opera Neighbours. She acknowledged this viewpoint, saying, "If you're part of a record company, I think to a degree it's fair to say that you're a manufactured product. You're a product and you're selling a product. It doesn't mean that you're not talented and that you don't make creative and business decisions about what you will and won't do and where you want to go."

In 1993, Australian director Baz Luhrmann introduced Minogue to photographer Bert Stern, known for his work with American actress Marilyn Monroe. Stern photographed her in Los Angeles and, comparing her to Monroe, commented Minogue had a similar mix of vulnerability and eroticism. Throughout her career, she has chosen photographers who attempt to create a new "look" for her, and the resulting photographs have appeared in a variety of magazines, from the cutting edge The Face to the more traditionally sophisticated Vogue and Vanity Fair, making the Minogue face and name known to a broad range of people. Stylist William Baker has suggested this is part of the reason she entered mainstream pop culture in Europe more successfully than many other pop singers who concentrate solely on selling records.

By 2000, Minogue was considered to have achieved a degree of musical credibility for having maintained her career longer than her critics had expected. Her progression from the wholesome "girl next door" to a more sophisticated performer with a flirtatious and playful persona attracted new fans. Her music video for "Spinning Around" led to some media outlets referring to her as "SexKylie", and sex became a stronger element in her subsequent videos. In September 2002, she was ranked 27 on VH1's 100 Sexiest Artists list. She was also named one of the 100 Hottest Women of All-Time by Men's Health in 2013. William Baker described her status as a sex symbol as a "double edged sword", observing "we always attempted to use her sex appeal as an enhancement of her music and to sell a record. But now it has become in danger of eclipsing what she actually is: a pop singer." After 20 years as a performer, she was described by BBC's Fiona Pryor as a fashion "trend-setter" and a "style icon who constantly reinvents herself". Pointing out the several reinventions in Minogue's image, Larissa Dubecki from The Age labelled her the "Mother of Reinvention".

Minogue has been inspired by and compared to American artist Madonna throughout her career. She received negative comments that her Rhythm of Love Tour in 1991 was too similar visually to Madonna's Blond Ambition World Tour, for which critics labelled her a Madonna wannabe. Writing for The Observer's Music Monthly, Rufus Wainwright described her as "the anti-Madonna. Self-knowledge is a truly beautiful thing and Kylie knows herself inside out. She is what she is and there is no attempt to make quasi-intellectual statements to substantiate it. She is the gay shorthand for joy." Kathy McCabe for The Telegraph noted Minogue and Madonna follow similar styles in music and fashion, but concluded, "Where they truly diverge on the pop-culture scale is in shock value. Minogue's clips might draw a gasp from some but Madonna's ignite religious and political debate unlike any other artist on the planet... Simply, Madonna is the dark force; Kylie is the light force." Minogue has said of Madonna, "Her huge influence on the world, in pop and fashion, meant that I wasn't immune to the trends she created. I admire Madonna greatly but in the beginning she made it difficult for artists like me, she had done everything there was to be done", and "Madonna's the Queen of Pop, I'm the princess. I'm quite happy with that."

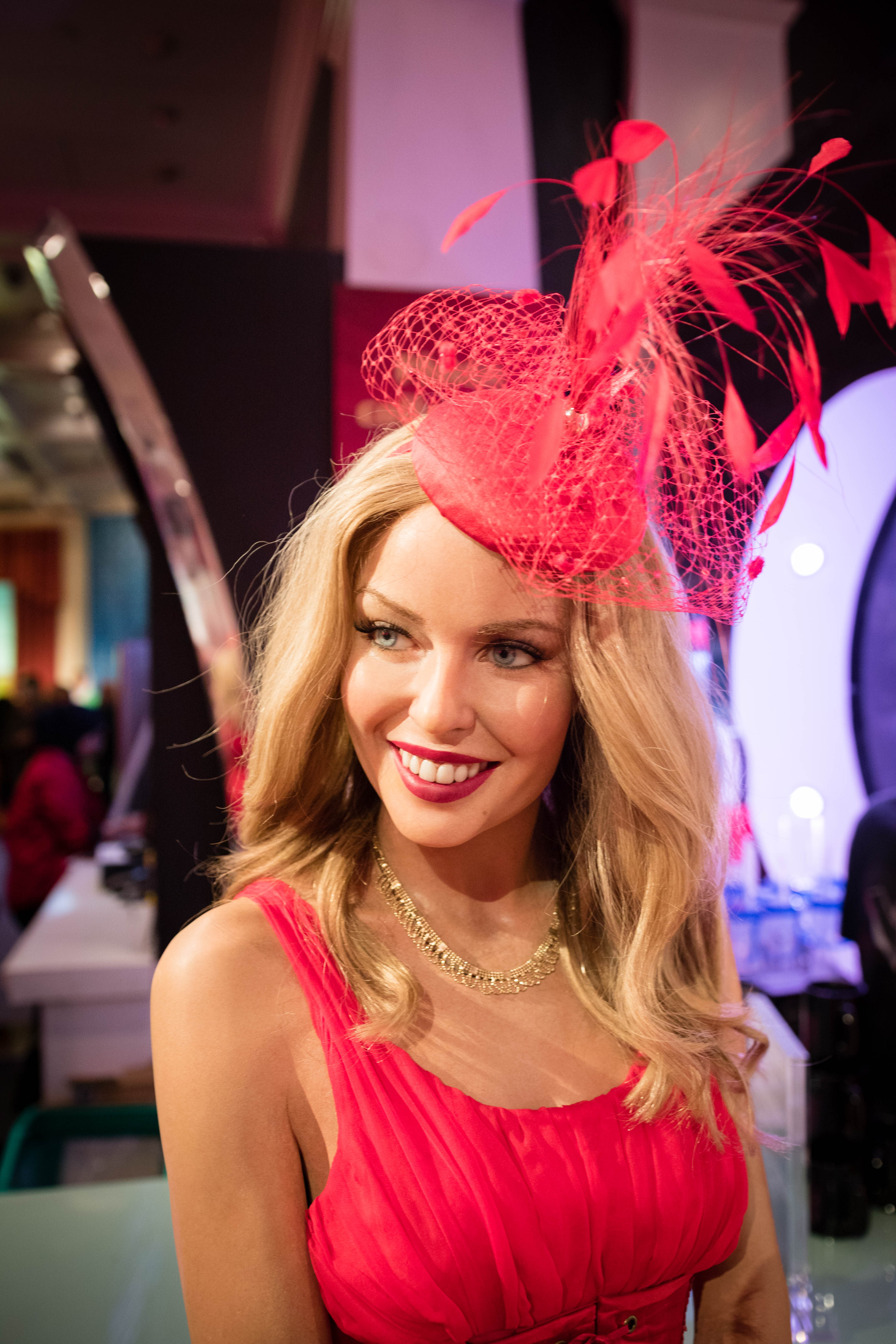
Wax statue of Minogue at the Madame Tussauds in London (2017)

In January 2007, Madame Tussauds in London unveiled its fourth waxwork of Minogue. During the same week a bronze cast of her hands was added to Wembley Arena's "Square of Fame". In 2007, a bronze statue of Minogue was unveiled at Melbourne Docklands for permanent display.

In March 2010, researchers declared Minogue as the "most powerful celebrity in Britain". The study examined how marketers identify celebrity and brand partnerships. Mark Husak, head of Millward Brown's UK media practice, said: "Kylie is widely accepted as an adopted Brit. People know her, like her and she is surrounded by positive buzz". In 2016, according to the Sunday Times Rich List, Minogue had a net worth of £55 million.

In May 2020, Alison Boshoff of The New Zealand Herald labelled her as the "great comeback queen of Pop, for springing back from any setback" in her life and career. In November 2020, Nick Levine of BBC described her as "pop's most underestimated icon", adding Minogue has "lasted more than 30 years by delivering pop songs with passion and panache, and retaining a quintessentially likeable persona along the way, in such a cutthroat industry." In June 2023, Barbara Ellen of The Guardian commented "modesty, likeability and vulnerability have aided Minogue enduring appeal", 36 years after the 1987 single "I Should Be So Lucky" was released.

Minogue is regarded as a gay icon, which she has encouraged with comments including "I am not a traditional gay icon. There's been no tragedy in my life, only tragic outfits" and "My gay audience has been with me from the beginning ... they kind of adopted me." Her status as a gay icon has been attributed to her music, fashion sense and career longevity. Author Constantine Chatzipapatheodoridis wrote about Minogue's appeal to gay men in Strike a Pose, Forever: The Legacy of Vogue... and observed she "frequently incorporates camp-inflected themes in her extravaganzas, drawing mainly from the disco scene, the S/M culture, and the burlesque stage." In Beautiful Things in Popular Culture (2007), Marc Brennan stated Minogue's work "provides a gorgeous form of escapism". Minogue has explained she first became aware of her gay audience in 1988, when several drag queens performed to her music at a Sydney pub, and she later saw a similar show in Melbourne. She said she felt "very touched" to have such an "appreciative crowd", and this encouraged her to perform at gay venues throughout the world, as well as headlining the 1994 Sydney Gay and Lesbian Mardi Gras. Minogue has one of the largest gay followings in the world.

== Legacy ==
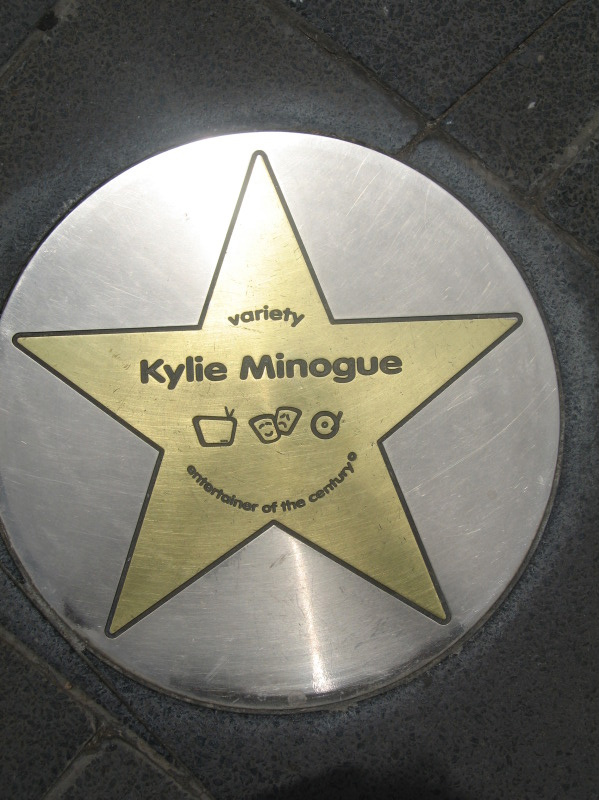
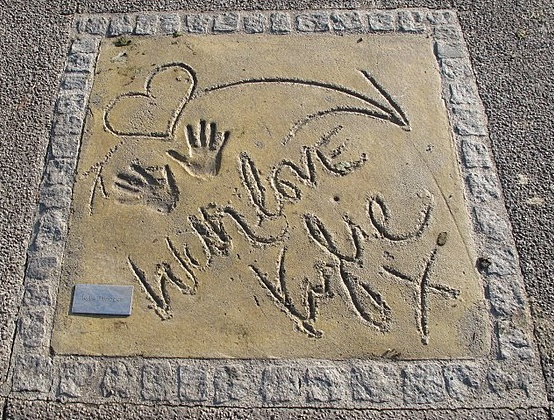
Minogue's star on the Melbourne's Walk of Stars (2007) and handprints and signature in Olympiapark, Munich (2015)

Entertainment Weekly's Ernest Macias said that by combining "a panache for fabulous fashion" with "her unequivocal disco-pop sound", Minogue "established herself as a timeless icon." Paula Joye of The Sydney Morning Herald wrote, "Minogue's fusion of fashion and music has made a huge contribution to the style zeitgeist." Fiona MacDonald, from fashion magazine Madison, acknowledged Minogue as "one of the handful of singers recognised around the world by her first name alone. ... And yet despite becoming an international music superstar, style icon and honorary Brit, those two syllables still seem as Australian as the smell of eucalyptus or a barbeque on a hot day." In 2007 and 2009, the Victoria and Albert Museum "celebrated her influence on fashion" with an exhibition.

In 2012, Dino Scatena of The Sydney Morning Herald wrote about Minogue: "A quarter of a century ago, a sequence of symbiotic events altered the fabric of Australian popular culture and set in motion the transformation of a 19-year-old soap actor from Melbourne into an international pop icon." Scatena also described her as "Australia's single most successful entertainer and a world-renowned style idol". In the same year, VH1 cited Minogue among its choices on the 100 Greatest Women in Music and the 50 Greatest Women of the Video Era.

Minogue has been recognised with many honorific nicknames, most notably the "Princess of Pop". Jon O'Brien of AllMusic reviewed her box-set The Albums 2000–2010 and stated it "contains plenty of moments to justify her position as one of the all-time premier pop princesses." In January 2012, NME critics ranked her single "Can't Get You Out of My Head" at number four on their Greatest Pop Songs in History list. Channel 4 listed her as one of the world's greatest pop stars. In 2020, Rolling Stone Australia placed her at number three on its 50 Greatest Australian Artists of All Time list. In March 2024, to commemorate the 65th anniversary of International Women's Day, Minogue was one of a number of female celebrities had their likeness turned into Barbie dolls. In April 2024, she was included in Time's annual list of top 100 "most influential" people in the world. In February 2025, she received a "commemorative star" at Melbourne Park.

Minogue's work has influenced pop and dance artists including Olly Alexander, Melanie C, Alice Chater, Ricki-Lee Coulter, Paris Hilton, Dua Lipa, Kim Petras, Rina Sawayama, September, Slayyyter, The Veronicas, Diana Vickers, Pabllo Vittar, and Jessie Ware. French avant-garde guitarist Noël Akchoté released the album So Lucky in 2007, featuring solo guitar versions of songs recorded by Minogue.

== Achievements ==
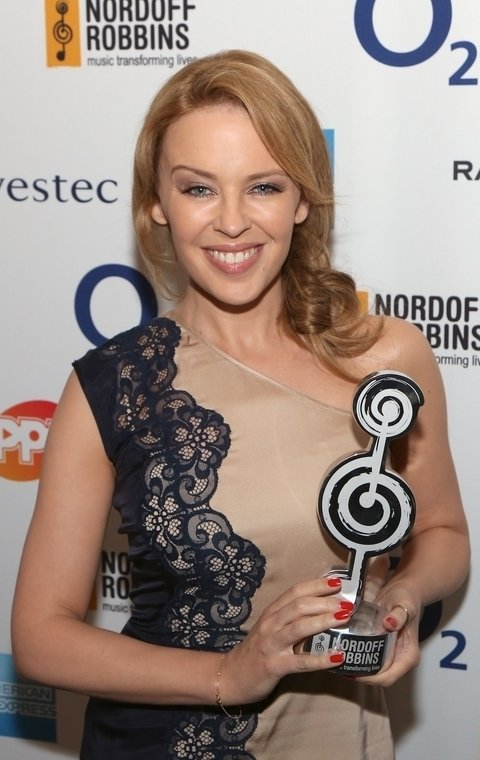
In 2012, Minogue won the Silver Clef Award in recognition of her contribution to the music industry.

Minogue has received many accolades, including two Grammy Awards, four Brit Awards, eighteen ARIA Music Awards, two MTV Video Music Awards, three MTV Europe Music Awards and six Mo Awards, including the Australian Performer of the Year in 2001 and 2003. In October 2007, she was honoured with Music Industry Trust's award for recognition of her 20-year career and was hailed as "an icon of pop and style", becoming the first female musician to receive a Music Industry Trust award. In July 2008, she was invested by Charles III (when Prince of Wales) as an Officer of the Order of the British Empire. In April 2017, the Britain–Australia Society recognised Minogue with its 2016 award for outstanding contribution to the improving of relations and bilateral understanding between the countries. The citation reads: "In recognition of significant contributions to the Britain-Australia relationship as an acclaimed singer, songwriter, actor and iconic personality in both countries". The award was announced at a reception in Australia House but was personally presented the next day by Prince Philip, Patron of the Society, at Windsor Castle. In January 2019, she was appointed Officer of the Order of Australia in the Australia Day Honours.

In August 2004, she held the record for the most singles at number one in the ARIA singles chart, with nine. In November 2011, Minogue was inducted by the Australian Recording Industry Association into the ARIA Hall of Fame. In January 2011, Minogue received a Guinness World Records citation for having the most consecutive decades with top five albums in the UK, with all her albums doing so. In February 2011, she made history for having two songs inside the top three on the U.S. Dance Club Songs chart, with her singles "Better than Today" and "Higher" charting at one and three, respectively. In June 2012, Official Charts Company mentioned Minogue is the 12th best selling singer in the United Kingdom to date, and the third best selling female artist, selling over 10.1 million singles. In December 2016, Billboard ranked her as the eighteenth most successful dance artist of all time. In November 2020, she became the only female artist to reach the top spot of the UK Albums Chart in five consecutive decades, when her studio album, Disco reached number one. In June 2023, she became the only female artist to reach the top ten of the UK singles chart in the 1980s to the 2020s, when her single "Padam Padam" entered the top ten. In December 2025, she became the first female artist in the UK singles chart, to achieve a number-one single in four decades–the 1980s, 1990s, 2000s and 2020s.

As of November 2020, Minogue has sold 80 million records worldwide. She is the most successful Australian female recording artist of all time. According to PRS for Music, her 2001 single "Can't Get You Out of My Head" was the most-played track of the 2000s, "after receiving the most airplay and live covers" in the decade.

== Personal life ==
Actor Jason Donovan and Minogue started dating while both were actors on the Australian soap opera, Neighbours. They remained in a relationship from 1986 to 1989. From 1989 to 1991, she dated Australian singer Michael Hutchence of the band INXS.

Minogue later had a relationship with French actor Olivier Martinez, which ended in 2007. She was in a relationship with Spanish model Andrés Velencoso from 2008 to 2013. She was also engaged to British actor Joshua Sasse up until 2017, followed by a five year relationship with GQ Executive Paul Solomons from 2018 to 2023.

=== Health ===
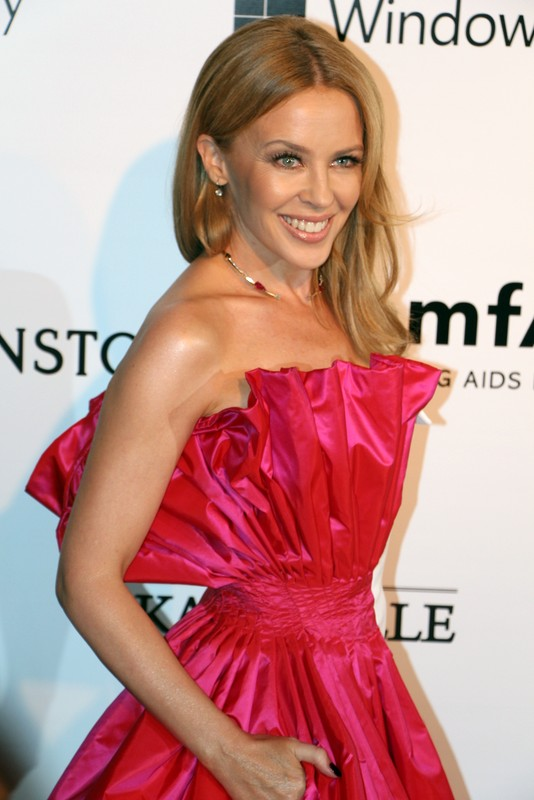
Minogue attending an amfAR gala in São Paulo, 2015

Minogue was diagnosed with breast cancer at the age of 36 in May 2005, leading to the postponement of the remainder of her Showgirl: The Greatest Hits Tour and her withdrawal from the Glastonbury Festival. Her hospitalisation and treatment in Melbourne resulted in a brief but intense period of media coverage, particularly in Australia, where then Prime Minister John Howard issued a statement of support. As media and fans began to congregate outside the Minogue residence in Melbourne, Victorian Premier Steve Bracks warned the international media any disruption of the Minogue family's rights under Australian privacy laws would not be tolerated.

Minogue underwent a lumpectomy, on 21 May 2005 at Cabrini Hospital in Malvern and commenced chemotherapy treatment soon after. After the surgery, the disease "had no recurrence". On 8 July 2005, she made her first public appearance after surgery when she visited a children's cancer ward at Melbourne's Royal Children's Hospital. She returned to France where she completed her chemotherapy treatment at the Institut Gustave Roussy in Villejuif, near Paris. In January 2006, her publicist announced she had finished chemotherapy, and her treatment continued for the next months. On her return to Australia for her concert tour, she discussed her illness and said her chemotherapy treatment had been like "experiencing a nuclear bomb". While appearing on the American television talk show, The Ellen DeGeneres Show in 2008, she said her cancer had originally been misdiagnosed. She commented, "because someone is in a white coat and using big medical instruments doesn't necessarily mean they're right", but later spoke of her respect for the medical profession.

Minogue was acknowledged for the impact she made by publicly discussing her breast cancer diagnosis and treatment. In May 2008, the French Cultural Minister Christine Albanel said, "Doctors now even go as far as saying there is a 'Kylie effect' encouraging young women to have regular checks." Several scientific studies have been carried out how publicity around her case resulted in more women undergoing regular checks for cancer symptoms. Television host Giuliana Rancic cited Minogue's cancer story as "inspirational", when Rancic was diagnosed with breast cancer.

In her 2026 docuseries Kylie, Minogue revealed that she had experienced a recurrence of breast cancer in 2021. It was found early during a health check-up. She kept her diagnosis private and was able to beat it shortly thereafter. Her song "Story", from the 2023 album Tension, was inspired by her experience.

=== Philanthropy ===
Minogue has helped fundraise on many occasions. In 1989, she participated in recording "Do They Know It's Christmas?" under the name Band Aid II to help raise money. In 2008, Minogue pledged her support for a campaign to raise funds for abused children, to be donated to the British charities ChildLine and the National Society for the Prevention of Cruelty to Children. According to the source, around $93 million was raised. She spoke out in relation to the cause, saying: "Finding the courage to tell someone about being abused is one of the most difficult decisions a child will ever have to make." Since her breast cancer diagnosis in 2005, she has been a sponsor and ambassador for the cause. In May 2010, she held a breast cancer campaign for the first time. She later spoke about the cause saying "It means so much to me to be part of this year's campaign for Fashion Targets Breast Cancer. I wholeheartedly support their efforts to raise funds for the vital work undertaken by Breakthrough Breast Cancer." For the cause, she "posed in a silk sheet emblazoned with the distinctive target logo of Fashion Targets Breast Cancer" for photographer Mario Testino. Minogue is a supporter of amfAR, The Foundation for AIDS Research, hosting the amfAR Inspiration Gala in Los Angeles in 2010. She has also attended amfAR fundraising benefits in Cannes, and performed at galas for the charity in São Paulo and Hong Kong.

In early 2010, Minogue along with many other artists, under the name Helping Haiti, recorded a cover version of "Everybody Hurts". The single was a fundraiser to help after the 2010 Haiti earthquake. During her 2011 Aphrodite World Tour, the 2011 Tōhoku earthquake and tsunami struck Japan, which was on her itinerary. She declared she would continue to tour there, stating, "I was here to do shows and I chose not to cancel, Why did I choose not to cancel? I thought long and hard about it and it wasn't an easy decision to make." While she was there, she and Australian Prime Minister Julia Gillard were star guests at an Australian Embassy fundraiser for the disaster. In April 2014, she launched One Note Against Cancer, a campaign to raise funds and awareness for French cancer research charity APREC (The Alliance for Cancer Research). As part of the campaign, she released the single "Crystallize", with the public able to bid via online auction to own each of the song's 4,408 notes. The proceeds of the auction were donated to APREC, with the names of the successful bidders appearing in the accompanying music video's credits. In January 2020, in response to the 2019–20 Australian bushfire season, she announced she and her family were donating A$500,000 towards immediate firefighting efforts and ongoing support.

== Filmography ==
- The Henderson Kids (1985)
- Neighbours (1986–88 & 2022)
- The Delinquents (1989)
- Street Fighter (1994)
- The Vicar of Dibley (1994)
- Cut (2000)
- Sample People (2000)
- Moulin Rouge! (2001)
- Kath & Kim (2004)
- White Diamond: A Personal Portrait of Kylie Minogue (2007)
- Doctor Who (2007)
- Jack & Diane (2012)
- Holy Motors (2012)
- San Andreas (2015)
- Young & Hungry (2015)
- Galavant (2015)
- Swinging Safari (2018)
- The Residence (2025)
- Kylie (2026)

== Discography ==
- Kylie (1988)
- Enjoy Yourself (1989)
- Rhythm of Love (1990)
- Let's Get to It (1991)
- Kylie Minogue (1994)
- Impossible Princess (1997)
- Light Years (2000)
- Fever (2001)
- Body Language (2003)
- X (2007)
- Aphrodite (2010)
- Kiss Me Once (2014)
- Kylie Christmas (2015)
- Golden (2018)
- Disco (2020)
- Tension (2023)
- Tension II (2024)

== Concert tours and residencies ==
Headlining tours

- Disco in Dream (1989)
- Enjoy Yourself Tour (1990)
- Rhythm of Love Tour (1991)
- Let's Get to It Tour (1991)
- Intimate and Live (1998)
- On a Night Like This (2001)
- KylieFever2002 (2002)
- Showgirl: The Greatest Hits Tour (2005)
- Showgirl: Homecoming Tour (2006–2007)
- KylieX2008 (2008–2009)
- For You, for Me (2009)
- Aphrodite: Les Folies Tour (2011)
- Anti Tour (2012)
- Kiss Me Once Tour (2014–2015)
- Summer 2015 (2015)
- A Kylie Christmas (2015–2016)
- Kylie Presents Golden (2018)
- Golden Tour (2018–2019)
- Summer 2019 (2019–2020)
- Tension Tour (2025)

Residencies

- More Than Just a Residency (2023–2024)

== See also ==
- Kylie Minogue products
