= List of songs recorded by Kylie Minogue =

Songs by Australian singer

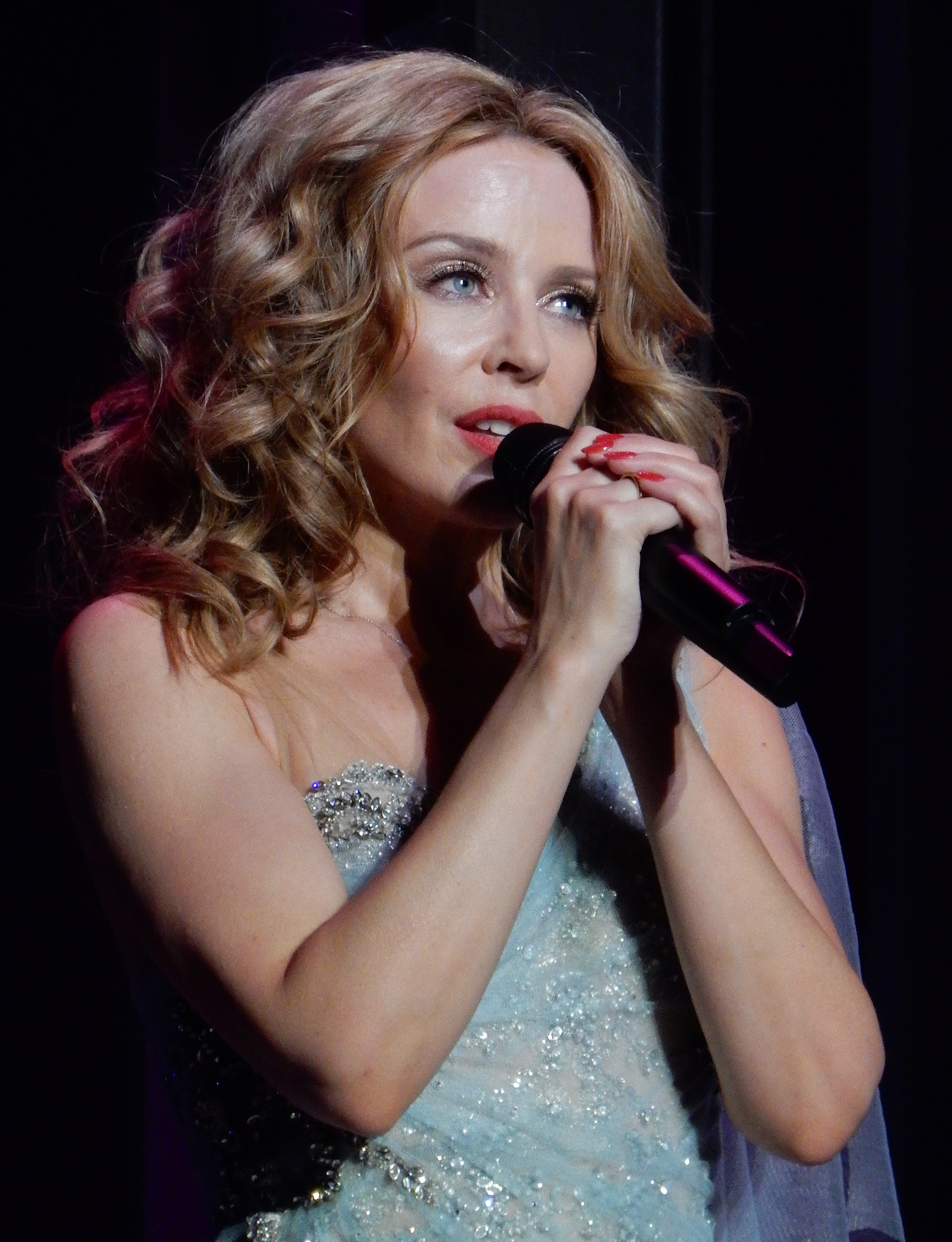
Minogue performing on her Kiss Me Once Tour in Manchester in 2014

Australian singer Kylie Minogue signed a record deal with Mushroom Records in 1987, and released her debut album Kylie in 1988. The bubblegum pop record was the first collaboration with long-time partners Stock Aitken Waterman, who also wrote and produced her subsequent studio albums Enjoy Yourself (1989), Rhythm of Love (1990), and Let's Get to It (1991). During her years under Deconstruction Records, Minogue released her eponymous fifth album (1994), described as "a sophisticated, stylish dance record" by Digital Spy, on which she collaborated with music producers Brothers in Rhythm. Impossible Princess (1997) saw the singer adopt a more "experimental" approach, with elements of trip hop and electronica, for which she penned every track; the album touches on themes of self-discovery and freedom of expression.

Returning to more dance-oriented music, Minogue signed to Parlophone in 1999 and released Light Years the following year. Fever (2001) contained disco elements, while Body Language (2003) references to songs from the 1980s and explores genres like R&B and hip hop. She worked with Stuart Price, Greg Kurstin and Calvin Harris during her albums, X (2007) and Aphrodite (2010), which mostly continued her dance-pop style of music. Kiss Me Once (2014), released under her management contract with Roc Nation, featured production and songwriting from Sia and Pharrell Williams. Her Christmas album, Kylie Christmas (2015) contains holiday-themed covers and original tracks.

By 2017, Minogue joined BMG Rights Management and released the country-influenced Golden the following year. Disco (2020) and Tension (2023), both influenced by 1980s music, had Minogue engineer her own vocals.

Minogue has also recorded songs for a number of side projects. In 1988, she worked with Jason Donovan on the single "Especially for You" and the B-side "All I Wanna Do Is Make You Mine". She went on to record "Where the Wild Roses Grow" and "Death Is Not the End" for Nick Cave and the Bad Seeds' Murder Ballads (1996). She collaborated with American producer Fernando Garibay on two electronic-influenced extended plays Sleepwalker (2014) and Kylie + Garibay (2015). She has also contributed to various charity releases, including "Do They Know It's Christmas?" (1989), "Everybody Hurts" (2010), "God Only Knows" (2014) and "Stop Crying Your Heart Out" (2020).

== Songs ==
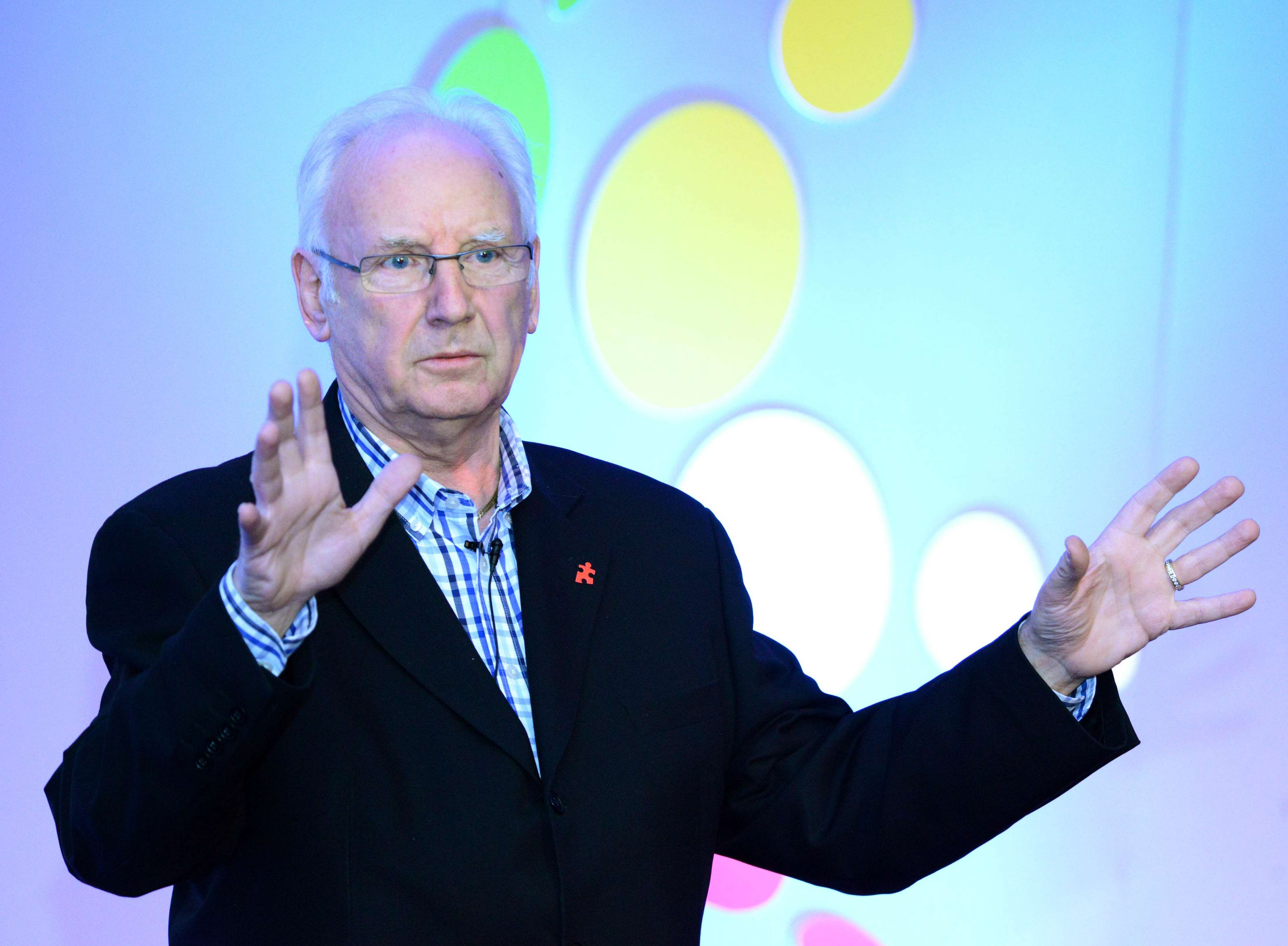
Along with Matt Aitken and Mike Stock, Pete Waterman (pictured) wrote and produced four studio albums for Minogue.

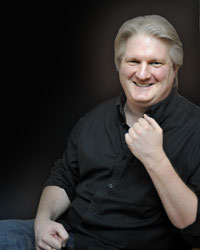
Steve Anderson has worked with Minogue on five studio albums.

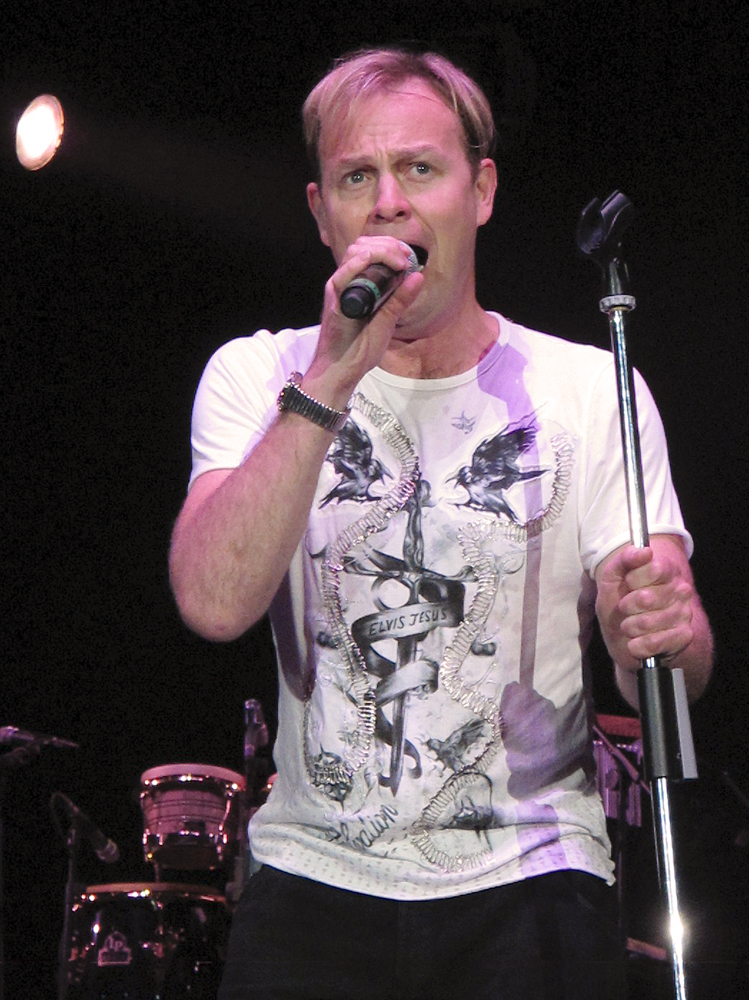
Minogue duetted with Jason Donovan on "Especially for You" and "All I Wanna Do Is Make You Mine".

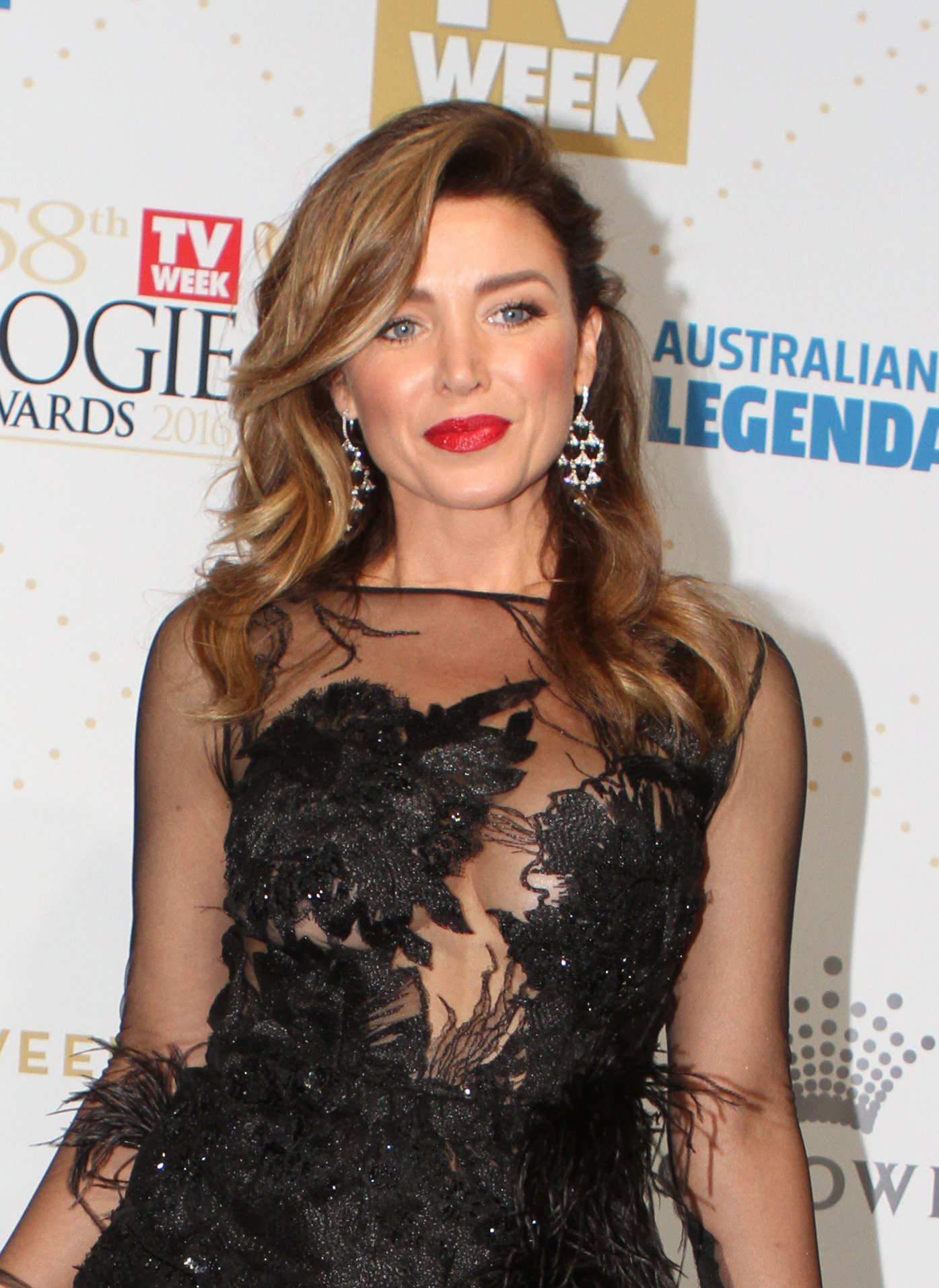
Dannii Minogue collaborated with her sister on "100 Degrees", "So in Love with Yourself" and "The Winner Takes It All".

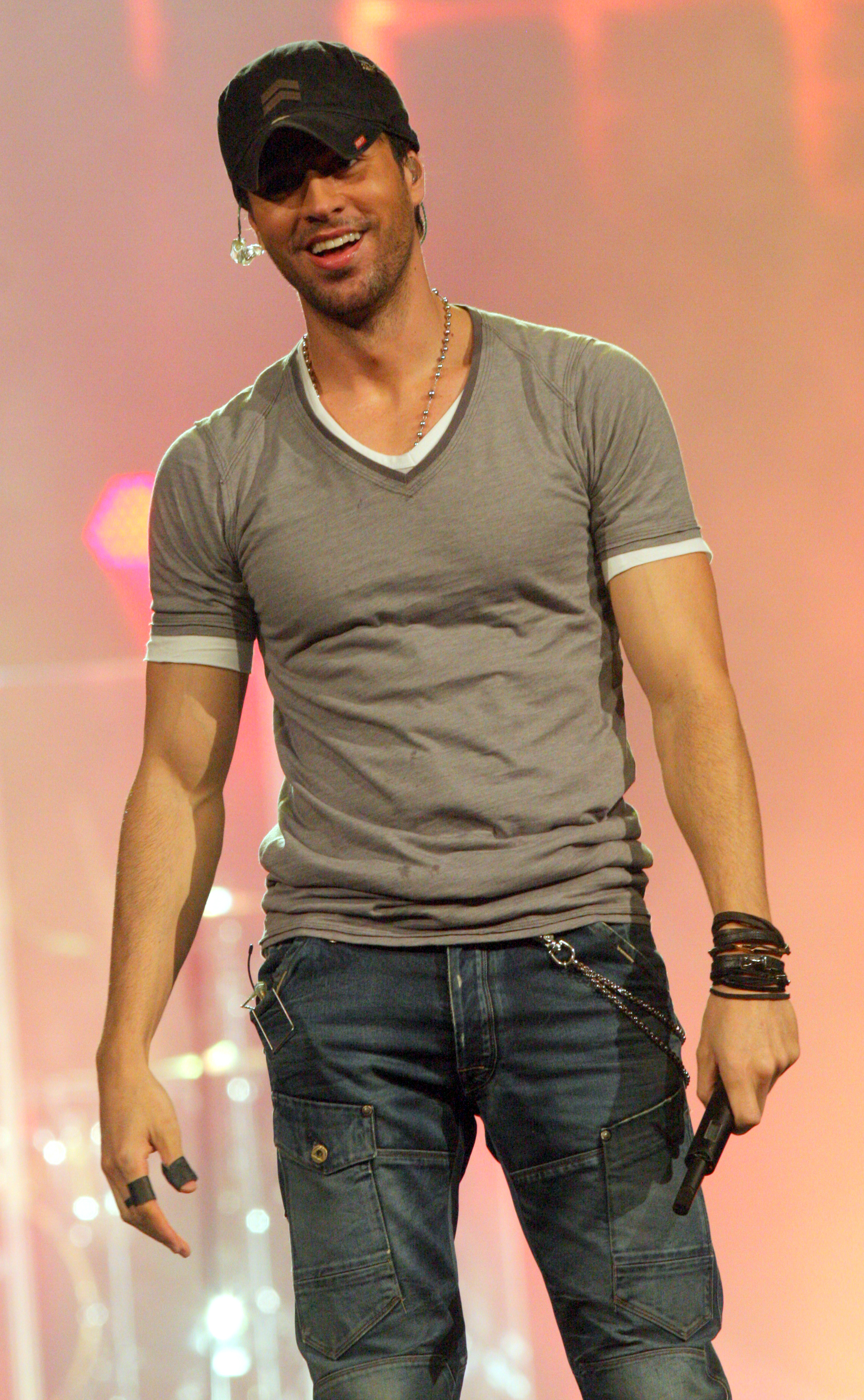
Minogue was featured on Enrique Iglesias's song "Beautiful", which appeared on his tenth studio album Sex and Love, and Minogue's twelfth Kiss Me Once.

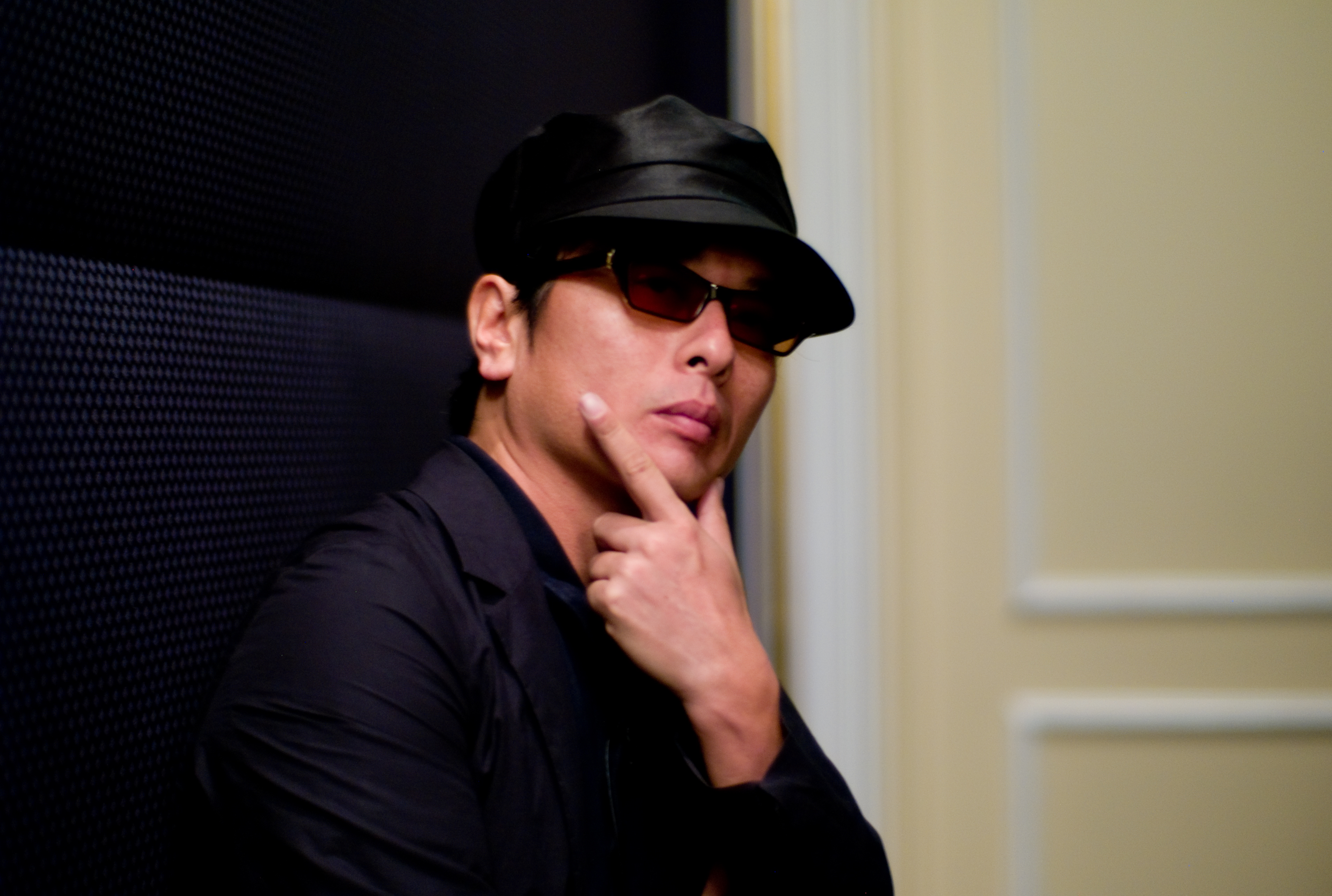
Minogue and Towa Tei's 1996 collaborative session outputted "GBI (German Bold Italic)" and "Sometime Samurai". The tracks were released in 1998 and 2005, respectively.

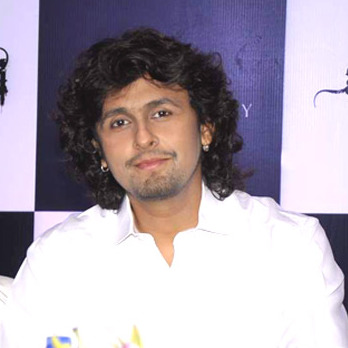
Minogue, Sonu Nigam (pictured) and Suzanne D'Mello recorded "Chiggy Wiggy" for the 2009 Indian film Blue's soundtrack. Minogue also performed it in the film as a cameo role.

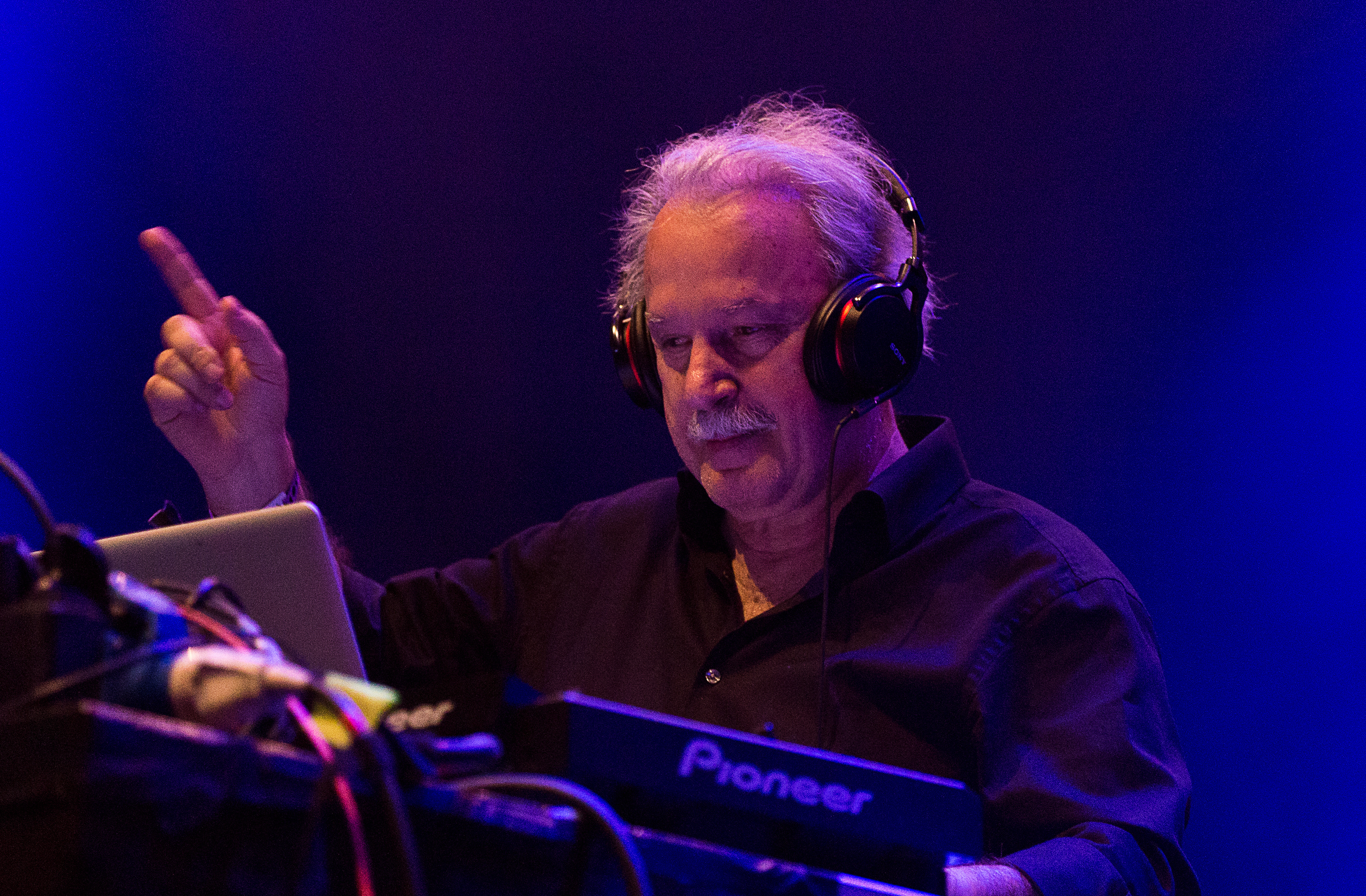
Minogue contributed her vocals to Giorgio Moroder's 2015 track "Right Here, Right Now". In turn, his spoken word and production were included on Kylie + Garibay's "Your Body".

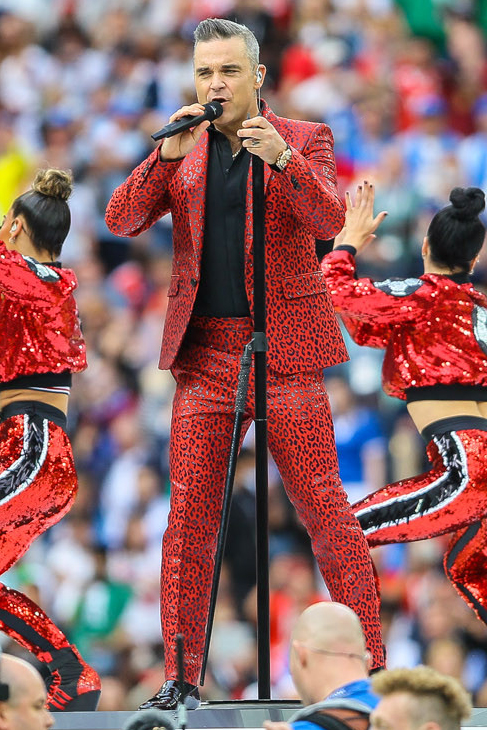
Minogue approached Robbie Williams to write songs for her seventh studio album Light Years. He was eventually credited for writing three tracks, including "Kids".

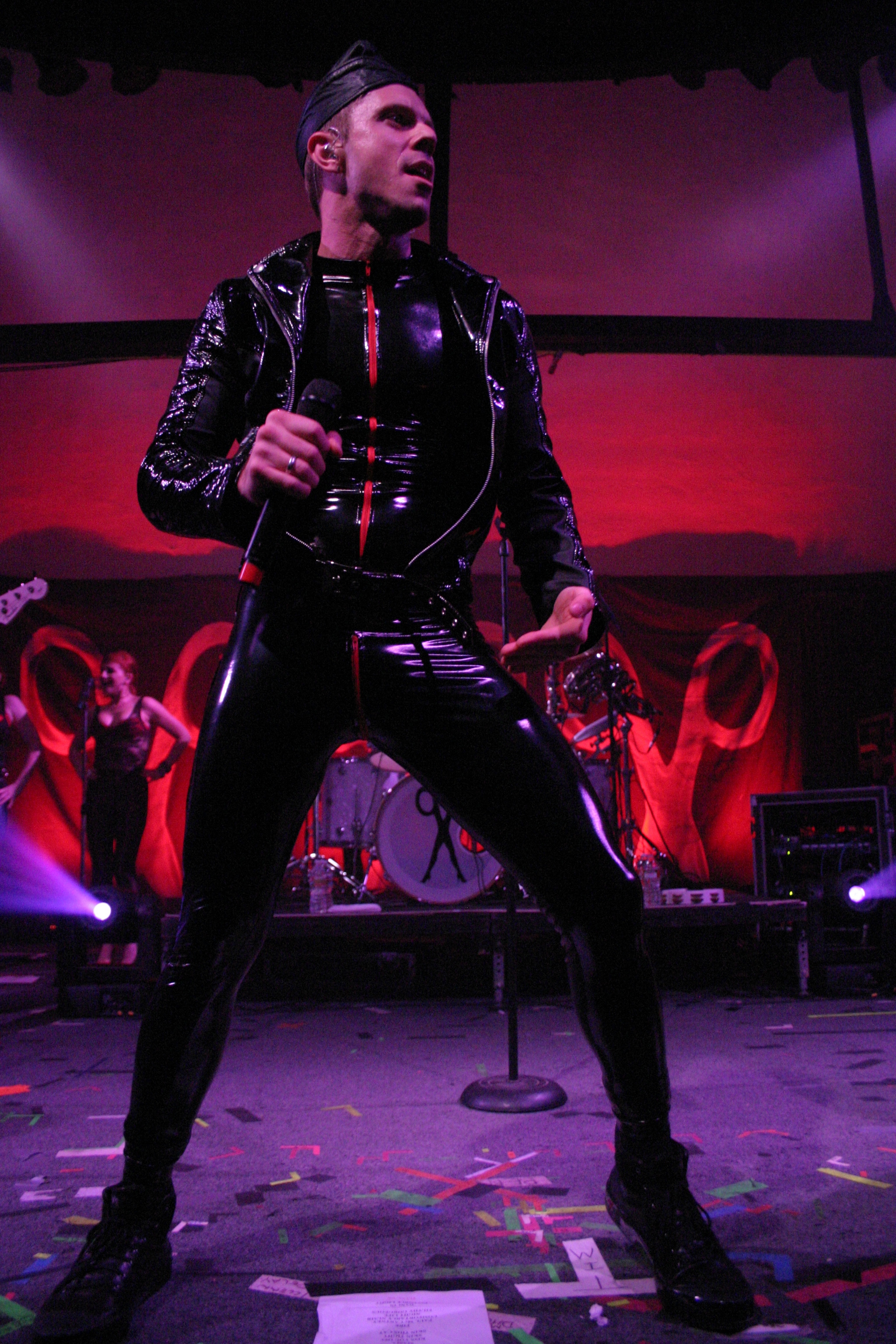
Scissor Sisters' lead member, Jake Shears, wrote "I Believe in You" and two of Minogue's other tracks. She performed uncredited backing vocals on his band's single "Any Which Way", and appeared with him on Nervo's "The Other Boys".

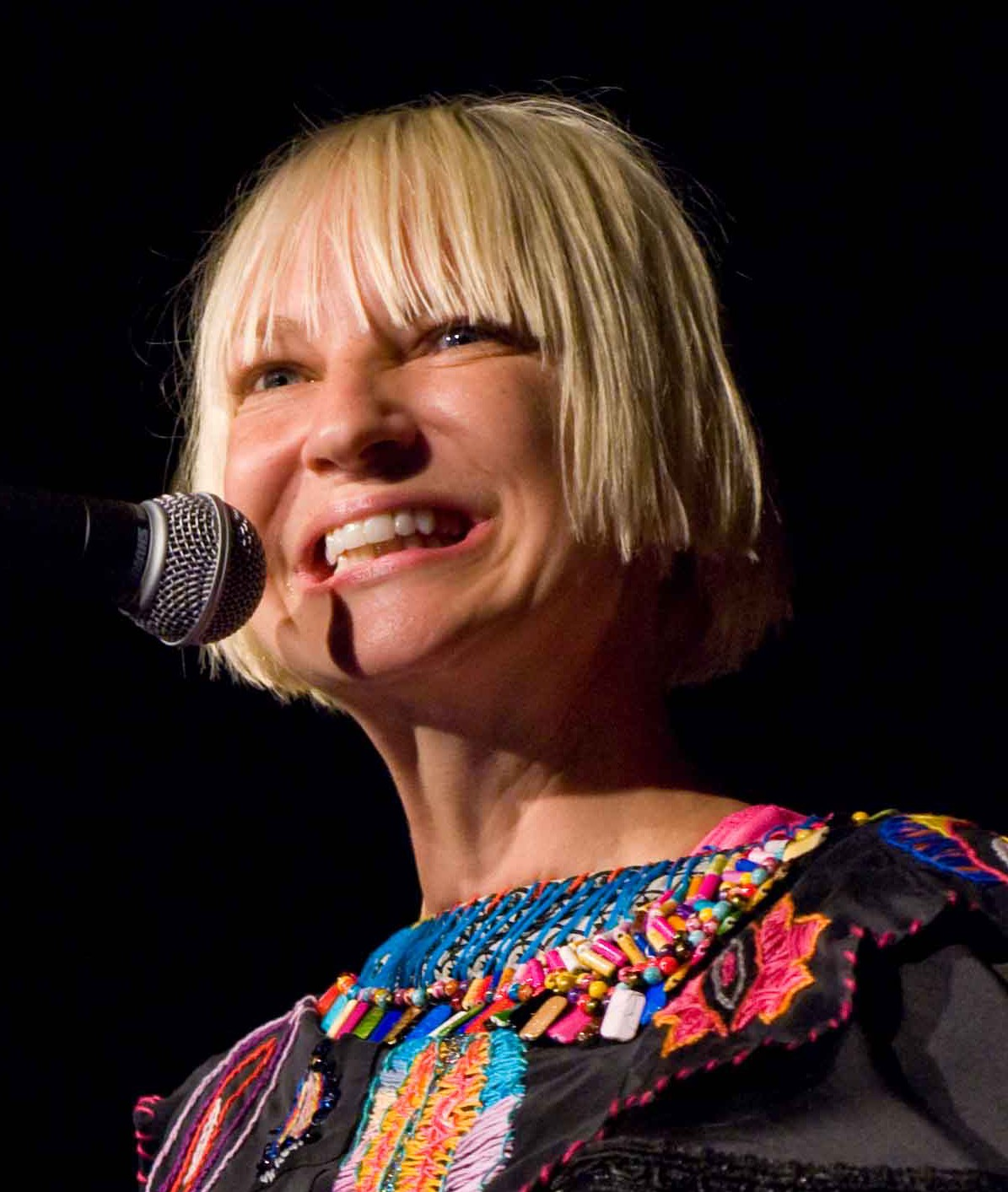
Sia wrote Kiss Me Once's title track and "Sexercize".

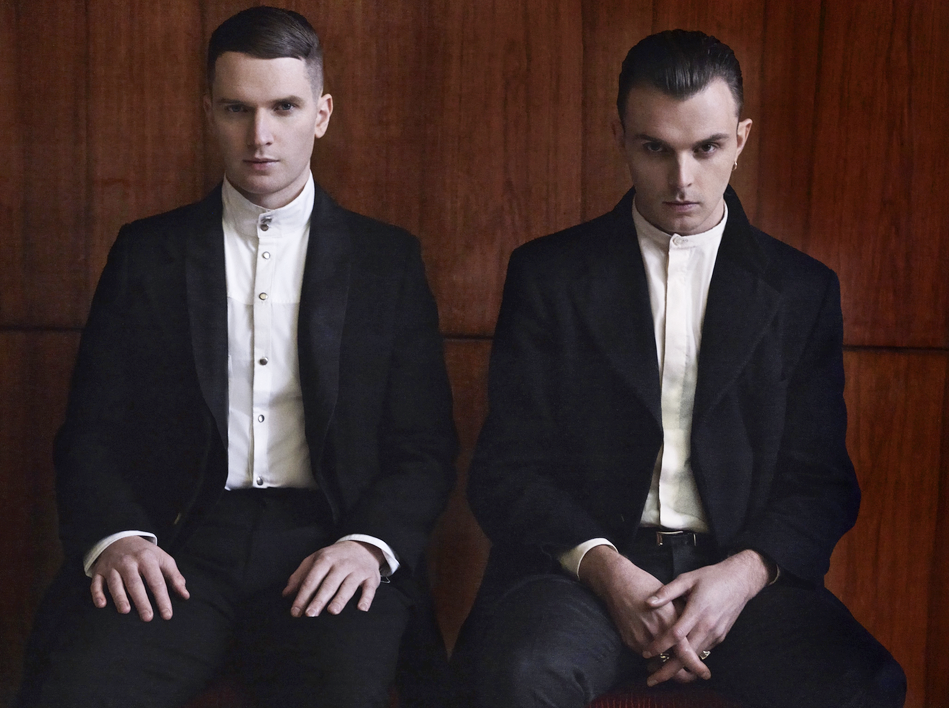
Hurts featured Minogue on "Devotion", a song from their debut album Happiness. She later performed an acoustic rendition of the duo's "Wonderful Life" on Radio 1's Live Lounge.

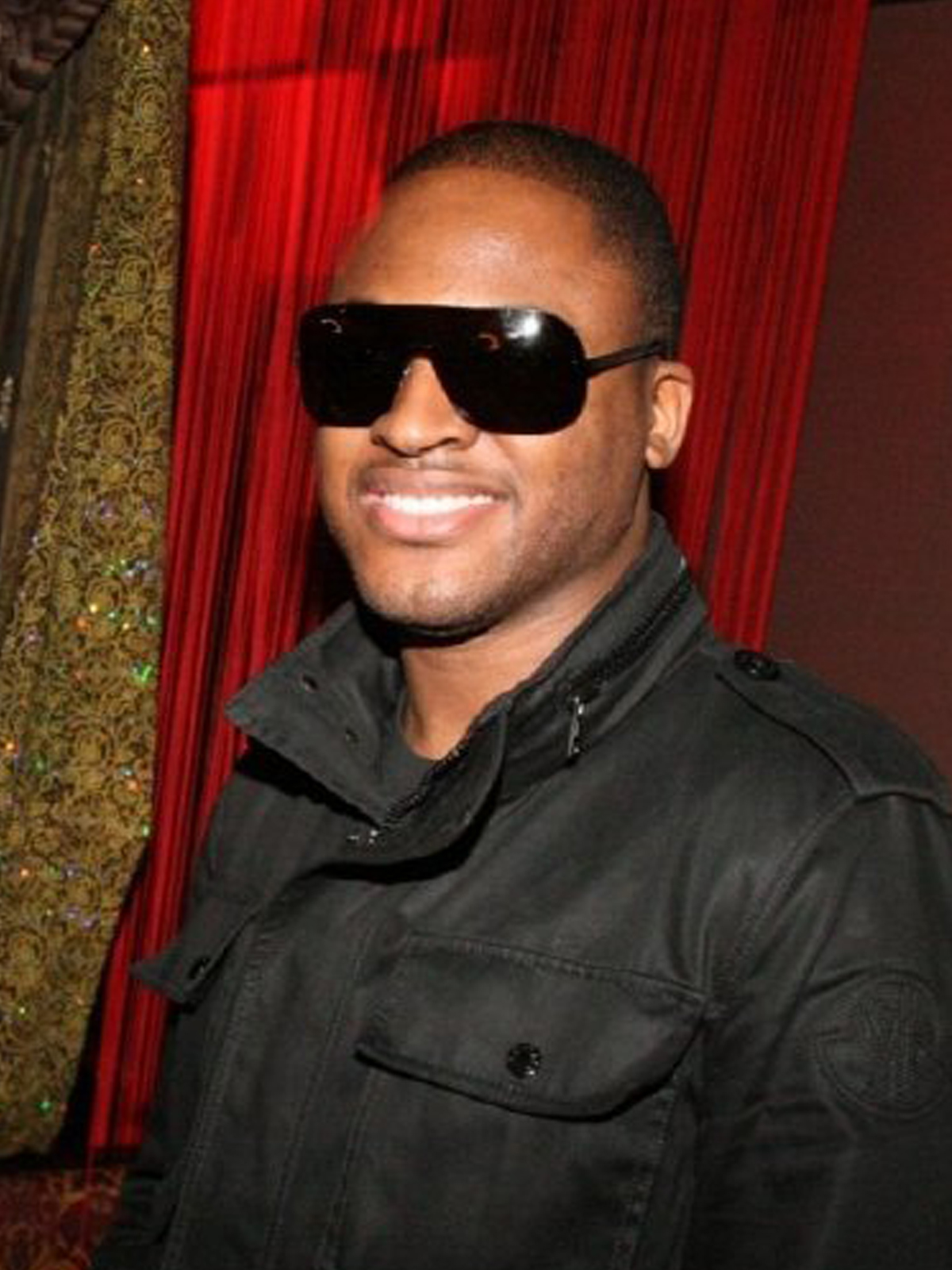
Minogue provided vocals for Taio Cruz's single "Higher".

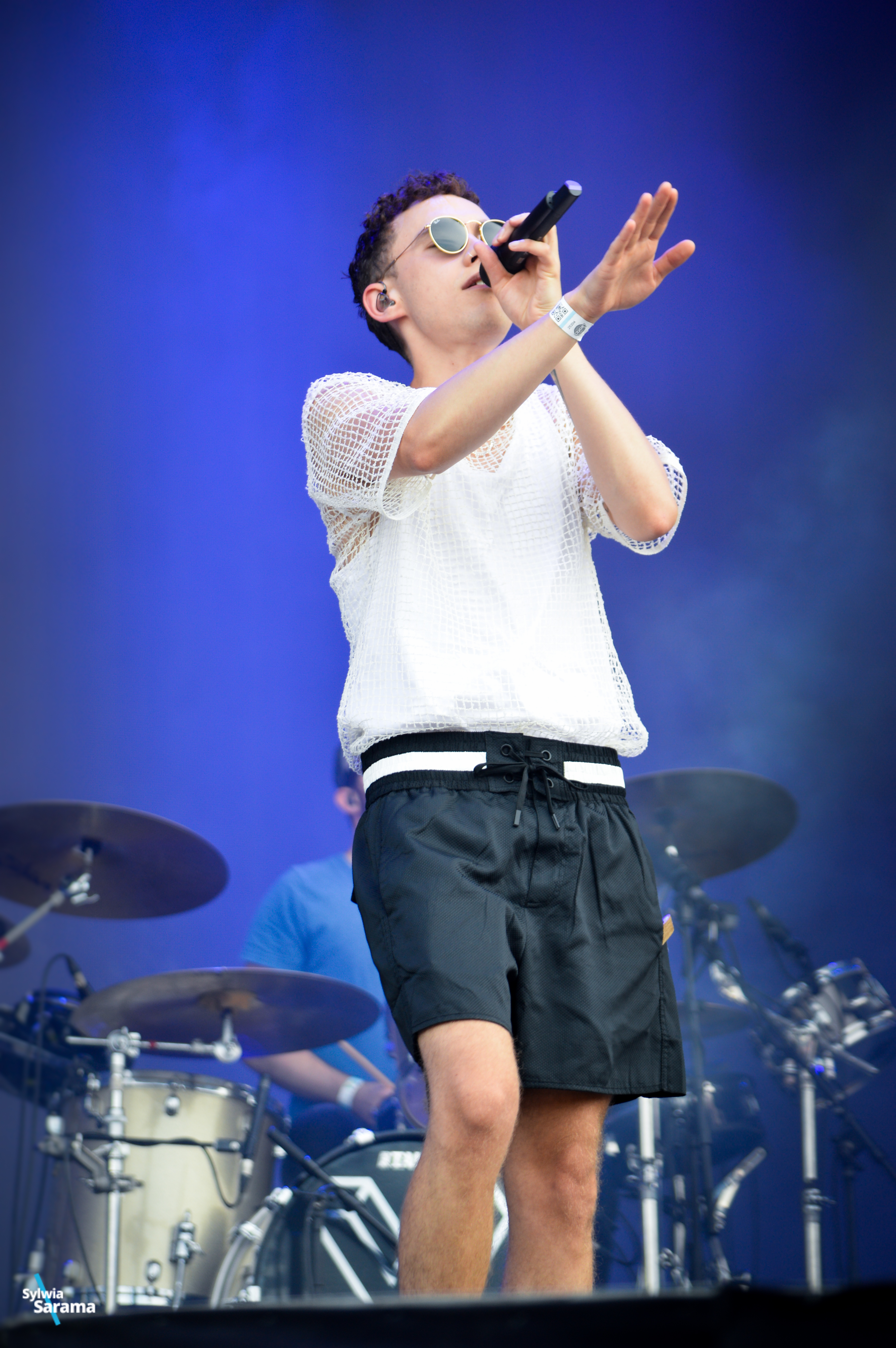
Olly Alexander of Years & Years collaborated with Minogue on a remix of his single "Starstruck" and "A Second to Midnight" from the deluxe edition of her Disco album.

Key
#	Indicates songs with background vocals by Kylie Minogue
†	Indicates songs originally released as B-side single

Name of song, featured performers, writers, originating album, and year released.
Song	Artist(s)	Writer(s)	Album(s)	Year	Ref(s).
"10 Out of 10"	Kylie Minogue and Oliver Heldens	Oliver Heldens; Kylie Minogue; Jackson Foote; Sarah Hudson; JHart; Liana Banks	Tension	2023	
"100 Degrees" (Note: An alternate version of the song, titled "100 Degrees (Still Disco to Me)", was released in April 2016.)	Kylie Minogue and Dannii Minogue	Kylie Minogue; Ash Howes; Richard Stannard; Steve Anderson	Kylie Christmas	2015	
"2 Hearts"	Kylie Minogue	Jim Eliot; Mima Stilwell	X	2007	
"2000 Miles"	Kylie Minogue	Chrissie Hynde	Kylie Christmas	2015	
"Absolutely Anything and Anything at All"	Kylie Minogue	John Greswell; Christopher Taylor	Non-album single	2015	
"After Dark"	Kylie Minogue	Cathy Dennis; Chris Braide	Body Language	2003	
"All I See"	Kylie Minogue	Jonas Jeberg; Mich Hansen; Edwin Serrano; Raymond Calhoun (Note: "All I See" contains an interpolation of "Outstanding", written by Raymond Calhoun, performed by The Gap Band.)	X	2007	
"All I Wanna Do Is Make You Mine"	Kylie Minogue and Jason Donovan	Mike Stock; Matt Aitken; Pete Waterman	B-side to "Especially for You" †	1988	
"All the Lovers" (Note: A Spanish version of "All the Lovers", titled "Los Amores", was released as the B-side single of "All the Lovers".)	Kylie Minogue	Jim Eliot; Mima Stilwell	Aphrodite	2010	
"Almost a Lover"	Kylie Minogue	Kylie Minogue; Karen Poole; Ash Thomas	B-side to "Red Blooded Woman" †	2004	
"Always and Forever"	Kylie Minogue	David Arch; Toddy	Unreleased (Note: "Always and Forever" served as the theme song for the British soap opera Night and Day (2001–03). Parlophone has not announced any plans to release it in the future.)	2001	
"Always Find The Time"	Kylie Minogue	Mike Stock; Matt Aitken; Pete Waterman; Rick James (Note: "Always Find The Time" contains an interpolation of "Candy Man", written and composed by Rick James, performed by Mary Jane Girls.)	Rhythm of Love	1990	
"Any Which Way" #	Scissor Sisters	Scott Hoffman; Jake Shears; Ana Lynch; Stuart Price	Night Work	2010	
"Aphrodite"	Kylie Minogue	Nerina Pallot; Andy Chatterley	Aphrodite	2010	
"At Christmas"	Kylie Minogue	Peter Wallevik; Daniel Davidsen; Patrick Joseph Devine	Kylie Christmas: Snow Queen Edition	2016	
"Automatic Love"	Kylie Minogue	Kylie Minogue; Inga Humpe; Charlie Mallozzi; Marco Sabiu	Kylie Minogue	1994	
"B.P.M."	Kylie Minogue	Kylie Minogue; Richard Stannard; Julian Gallagher	B-side to "I Believe in You" †	2004	
"Baby"	Kylie Minogue	Liz Winstanley; Bottolf Lodemal; Lars Aass	B-side to "Love at First Sight" †	2001	
"Beautiful"	Enrique Iglesias and Kylie Minogue	Enrique Iglesias; Mark Taylor; Alex Smith; Samuel Preston	Kiss Me Once and Sex and Love	2014	
"Bette Davis Eyes"	Kylie Minogue	Donna Weiss; Jackie DeShannon	BBC Radio 2: Sounds of the 80s	2014	
"Better than Today"	Kylie Minogue	Nerina Pallot; Andy Chatterley	Aphrodite	2010	
"Better the Devil You Know"	Kylie Minogue	Mike Stock; Matt Aitken; Pete Waterman	Rhythm of Love	1990	
"Bittersweet Goodbye"	Kylie Minogue	Kylie Minogue; Steve Anderson	Light Years	2000	
"Black and White"	Kylie and Garibay featuring Shaggy	Kylie Minogue; Fernando Garibay; Whitney Phillips	Kylie + Garibay	2015	
"Boombox"	Kylie Minogue	Andrew Frampton; Danielle Brisebois; Jimmy Harry; Mark Stent; Wayne Wilkins	Boombox	2008	
"Boy"	Kylie Minogue	Kylie Minogue; Julian Gallagher; Richard Stannard	B-side to "Can't Get You Out of My Head" †	2001	
"Break This Heartbreak"	Kylie and Garibay	Kylie Minogue; Fernando Garibay; Amanda Warner	Sleepwalker	2014	
"Breathe"	Kylie Minogue	Kylie Minogue; Dave Ball; Ingo Vauk	Impossible Princess	1997	
"Burning Up"	Kylie Minogue	Greg Fitzgerald; Tom Nichols	Fever	2001	
"Bury Me Deep in Love"	Kylie Minogue and Jimmy Little	David McComb	Corroboration	2001	
"Butterfly"	Kylie Minogue	Kylie Minogue; Steve Anderson	Light Years	2000	
"Can't Beat the Feeling"	Kylie Minogue	Borge Fjordheim; Hannah Robinson; Matt Prime; Pascal Gabriel; Richard Philips	Aphrodite	2010	
"Can't Get You Out of My Head" (Note: A mash-up version of "Can't Get You Out of My Head" and British band New Order's 1983 song "Blue Monday", titled "Can't Get Blue Monday Out of My Head", was released as the B-side to "Love at First Sight".)	Kylie Minogue	Cathy Dennis; Rob Davis	Fever	2001	
"Can't Stop Writing Songs About You"	Kylie Minogue and Gloria Gaynor	Peter Wallevik; Daniel Davidsen; Iain James; Sinéad Harnett	Disco: Guest List Edition	2021	
"Carried Away"	Kylie Minogue	Kylie Minogue; Greg Kurstin; Karen Poole	B-side to "In My Arms" and "Wow" †	2007	
"Celebrate You"	Kylie Minogue	Kylie Minogue; Maegan Cottone; Daniel Shah; Sky Adams	Disco	2020	
"Celebration"	Kylie Minogue	Robert Bell; James Taylor	Greatest Hits	1992	
"Chasing Ghosts"	Kylie and Garibay	Kylie Minogue; Fernando Garibay; Amanda Warner; Sterling Fox	Sleepwalker	2014	
"Cherry Bomb"	Kylie Minogue	Kylie Minogue; Christian Karlsson; Pontus Winnberg; Jonas Quant	B-side to "In My Arms" and "Wow" †	2007	
"Chiggy Wiggy"	Kylie Minogue, Sonu Nigam and Suzanne D'Mello	Abbas Tyrewala	Blue	2009	
"Chirpy Chirpy Cheep Cheep"	Kylie Minogue	Lally Stott	Swinging Safari	2018	
"Chocolate"	Kylie Minogue	Johnny Douglas; Karen Poole	Body Language	2003	
"Christmas Isn't Christmas 'Til You Get Here"	Kylie Minogue	Kylie Minogue; Steve Anderson; Karen Poole	Kylie Christmas	2015	
"Christmas Lights"	Kylie Minogue	Guy Berryman; Jonny Buckland; Will Champion; C. Martin	Kylie Christmas	2015	
"Christmas Wrapping"	Kylie Minogue featuring Iggy Pop	Chris Butler	Kylie Christmas	2015	
"City Games"	Kylie Minogue	Kylie Minogue; Julian Gallagher; Karen Poole; Richard Stannard	B-side to "Chocolate" †	2004	
"Closer"	Kylie Minogue	Kylie Minogue; Mike Stock; Pete Waterman	B-side to "Finer Feelings" †	1992	
"Closer"	Kylie Minogue	Beatrice Hatherley; Stuart Price	Aphrodite	2010	
"Come into My World"	Kylie Minogue	Cathy Dennis; Rob Davis	Fever	2001	
"Confide in Me" (Note: Minogue recorded a French version of the song, which was released in the 1995 Canadian edition of Kylie Minogue.)	Kylie Minogue	Steve Anderson; Dave Seaman; Owain Barton	Kylie Minogue	1994	
"Cool"	Kylie Minogue	Troye Sivan; Alex Hope	At Home with Kylie Minogue: The Sessions	2020	
"Cosmic"	Kylie Minogue	Kylie Minogue; Eg White	X	2007	
"Count the Days"	Kylie Minogue	Kylie Minogue; Stephen Bray	Rhythm of Love	1990	
"Cover Me with Kisses"	Kylie Minogue	Kylie Minogue; Mike Rose; Nick Foster; Steve Anderson	B-side to "Spinning Around" †	2000	
"Cowboy Style"	Kylie Minogue	Kylie Minogue; Steve Anderson; Dave Seaman	Impossible Princess	1997	
"Crave You (Reprise)"	Flight Facilities featuring Kylie Minogue	Hugo Gruzman; James Lyell; Giselle Rosselli	Down to Earth	2014	
"Cried Out Christmas"	Kylie Minogue	Kylie Minogue; Karen Poole; Matt Prime	Kylie Christmas	2015	
"Cruise Control"	Kylie Minogue	Kylie Minogue; Johnny Douglas; Karen Poole	B-side to "Red Blooded Woman" †	2004	
"Crystallize"	Kylie Minogue	Kylie Minogue; Dev Hynes; Scott Hoffman	Non-album single	2014	
"Cupid Boy"	Kylie Minogue	Luciana Caporaso; Magnus Lidehäll; Nick Clow; Sebastian Ingrosso	Aphrodite	2010	
"Dance Alone"	Sia and Kylie Minogue	Sia Furler; Jesse Shatkin	Reasonable Woman; Tension II	2024	
"Dance Floor Darling"	Kylie Minogue	Kylie Minogue; Linslee Campbell; Maegan Cottone; Skylar Adams	Disco	2020	
"Dancefloor"	Kylie Minogue	Steve Anderson; Cathy Dennis	Fever	2001	
"Dance to the Music"	Kylie Minogue	Kylie Minogue; Jennifer Decilveo; Vaughn Oliver; Jesse St. John; Tobias Wincorn	Tension II	2024	
"Dancing"	Kylie Minogue	Kylie Minogue; Nathan Chapman; Steve McEwan	Golden	2018	
"Dangerous Game"	Kylie Minogue	Steve Anderson; Dave Seaman	Kylie Minogue	1994	
"Dangerous Overture"	Kylie Minogue	Steve Anderson; Dave Seaman	Kylie Minogue	2004	
"Death Is Not the End"	Nick Cave and the Bad Seeds	Bob Dylan	Murder Ballads	1995	
"Devotion"	Hurts featuring Kylie Minogue	Theo Hutchcraft; Adam Anderson	Happiness	2010	
"Diamonds"	Kylie Minogue	Kylie Minogue; Jennifer Decilveo; Vaughn Oliver; Jesse St. John	Tension II	2024	
"Did It Again"	Kylie Minogue	Kylie Minogue; Steve Anderson; Dave Seaman	Impossible Princess	1997	
"Difficult by Design"	Kylie Minogue	Kylie Minogue; Charlie Mallozzi; Marco Sabiu	Hits+ (Note: Before appearing in Minogue's second compilation album Hits+ (2000), "Difficult by Design" and "Gotta Move On" were unreleased demos from Kylie Minogue (1994); "Stay This Way" was an unreleased demo from Impossible Princess (1997).)	2000	
"Disco Down"	Kylie Minogue	Johnny Douglas	Light Years	2000	
"Do It Again"	Kylie Minogue	Kylie Minogue; Greg Kurstin; Karen Poole	B-side to "In My Arms" and "Wow" †	2007	
"Do They Know It's Christmas?"	Band Aid II	Bob Geldof; Midge Ure	Non-album single	1989	
"Do You Dare?"	Kylie Minogue	Kylie Minogue; Mike Stock; Pete Waterman	B-side to "Give Me Just a Little More Time" †	1992	
"Dreams"	Kylie Minogue	Kylie Minogue; Steve Anderson; Dave Seaman	Impossible Princess	1997	
"Drum"	Kylie Minogue	Kylie Minogue; Richard Stannard; Duck Blackwell; Jon Green	Tension	2023	
"Drunk"	Kylie Minogue	Kylie Minogue; Steve Anderson; Dave Seaman	Impossible Princess	1997	
"Edge of Saturday Night"	The Blessed Madonna and Kylie Minogue	Kylie Minogue; Jin Jin; Marea Stamper; Rachel Keen	Godspeed; Tension II	2024	
"Enjoy Yourself"	Kylie Minogue	Mike Stock; Matt Aitken; Pete Waterman	Enjoy Yourself	1989	
"Especially for You"	Kylie Minogue and Jason Donovan	Mike Stock; Matt Aitken; Pete Waterman	Ten Good Reasons	1988	
"Everybody Hurts"	Helping Haiti	Bill Berry; Peter Buck; Mike Mills; Michael Stipe	Non-album single	2010	
"Everybody's Free (To Feel Good)"	Kylie Minogue	Nigel Swanston; Tim Cox	Kylie Christmas	2016	
"Every Day's Like Christmas"	Kylie Minogue	Mikkel Eriksen; Tor Erik Hermansen; Chris Martin	Kylie Christmas	2015	
"Every Little Part of Me"	Kylie Minogue	Kylie Minogue; Amy Wadge; Sky Adams	Golden	2018	
"Everything is Beautiful"	Kylie Minogue	Tim Rice-Oxley; Fraser T Smith	Aphrodite	2010	
"Falling"	Kylie Minogue	Neil Tennant; Chris Lowe	Kylie Minogue	1994	
"Feels So Good"	Kylie Minogue	Tom Aspaul	Kiss Me Once	2014	
"Fever"	Kylie Minogue	Greg Fitzgerald; Tom Nichols	Fever	2001	
"Fine"	Kylie Minogue	Kylie Minogue; Karen Poole; Chris Loco	Kiss Me Once	2014	
"Fine Wine"	Kylie Minogue	Kylie Minogue; Maegan Cottone; Sky Adams	Disco	2020	
"Finer Feelings"	Kylie Minogue	Mike Stock; Pete Waterman	Let's Get to It	1991	
"Flower"	Kylie Minogue	Kylie Minogue; Steve Anderson	The Abbey Road Sessions	2012	
"Fragile"	Kylie Minogue	Rob Davis	Fever	2001	
"GBI (German Bold Italic)"	Towa Tei featuring Kylie Minogue and Haruomi Hosono	Towa Tei; Kylie Minogue	Sound Museum	1997	
"Get Outta My Way"	Kylie Minogue	Mich Hansen; Lucas Secon; Damon Sharpe; Peter Wallevik; Daniel Heløy Davidsen	Aphrodite	2010	
"Getting Closer"	Kylie Minogue	Mike Stock; Matt Aitken; Pete Waterman	B-side to "The Loco-Motion" †	1987	
"G-House Project"	Gerling featuring Kylie Minogue	Gerling	When Young Terrorists; Chase the Sun	2001	
"Give It to Me"	Kylie Minogue	Kylie Minogue; Mark Picchiotti; Steve Anderson	Fever	2001	
"Give Me Just a Little More Time"	Kylie Minogue	Ronald Dunbar; Edyth Wayne	Let's Get to It	1991	
"Giving You Up"	Kylie Minogue	Kylie Minogue; Miranda Cooper; Brian Higgins; Tim Powell; Lisa Cowling; Paul Woods; Nick Coler	Ultimate Kylie	2004	
"Glad to Be Alive"	Kylie Minogue	Claude Carranza; Craig Harnath	B-side to "The Loco-Motion" †	1987	
"Glow"	Kylie and Garibay	Kylie Minogue; Fernando Garibay; Amanda Warner	Sleepwalker	2014	
"Go Hard or Go Home"	Kylie Minogue	Damon Sharpe; Daniel Heløy Davidsen; Lucas Secon; Mich Hansen; Thomas Sardorf	B-side to "All the Lovers" †	2010	
"God Only Knows"	Brian Wilson and various artists	Brian Wilson; Tony Asher	Non-album single	2014	
"Golden"	Kylie Minogue	Kylie Minogue; Lindsay Rimes; Liz Rose; Steve McEwan	Golden	2018	
"Golden Boy"	Kylie Minogue	Ariel Rechtshaid; Daniel Nigro; Justin Raisen	Kiss Me Once	2014	
"Good as Gone"	Kylie Minogue	Benjamin Kohn; Peter Kelleher; Thomas Barnes; Caroline Ailin; Noonie Bao	Tension II	2024	
"Good Life"	Kylie Minogue	Kylie Minogue; Steve Anderson	B-side to "Please Stay" †	2000	
"Good Like That"	Kylie Minogue	Joe Belmaati; Mich Hansen; Kara DioGuardi	B-side to "In Your Eyes" †	2001	
"Gotta Move On"	Kylie Minogue	Kylie Minogue; Charlie Mallozzi; Marco Sabiu	Hits+	2000	
"Got to Be Certain"	Kylie Minogue	Mike Stock; Matt Aitken; Pete Waterman	Kylie	1988	
"Green Light"	Kylie Minogue	Daniel Davidsen; Peter Wallevik; Ruby Spiro	Tension	2023	
"Hand on Your Heart"	Kylie Minogue	Mike Stock; Matt Aitken; Pete Waterman	Enjoy Yourself	1989	
"Hands"	Kylie Minogue	Mich Hansen; Daniel Davidsen; Kasper Larsen; Ryan Ashley	Tension	2023	
"Harmony"	Kylie Minogue	Kylie Minogue; Steve Anderson	B-side to "In Your Eyes" †	2001	
"Have Yourself a Merry Little Christmas"	Kylie Minogue	Hugh Martin; Ralph Blane	Kylie Christmas	2015	
"Heart Beat Rock"	Kylie Minogue	Kylie Minogue; Karen Poole; Calvin Harris; John Lipsey	X	2007	
"Heartstrings"	Kylie Minogue	Brian Higgins; Gerard O'Connell; Jason Resch; Jaxon Belina; Kieran Jones; Matt Gray; Miranda Cooper	Aphrodite	2010	
"Heaven and Earth"	Kylie Minogue	Mike Stock; Matt Aitken; Pete Waterman	Enjoy Yourself	1989	
"Heavenly Body"	Kylie Minogue	Kylie Minogue; Richard Stannard; Duck Blackwell; Jon Green	Tension	2023	
"Hello"	Kylie Minogue	John Morgan; William Lansley; Ina Wroldsen; Neave Applebaum	Tension II	2024	
"Hey Lonely"	Kylie Minogue	Kylie Minogue; Maegan Cottone; Sky Adams	Disco	2020	
"Higher"	Taio Cruz featuring Kylie Minogue	Taio Cruz; Sandy Wilhelm	Rokstarr	2009	
"Hold on to Now"	Kylie Minogue	Kylie Minogue; Richard Stannard; Duck Blackwell; Jon Green	Tension	2023	
"Hot in December"	Kylie Minogue	Kylie Minogue; Duck Blackwell; Ferras Alqaisi; Jason Evigan; Sarah Hudson; Pablo Bowman; Luke Fitton; Richard Stannard	Kylie Christmas (Fully Wrapped)	2025	
"I Am the One for You"	Kylie Minogue	Kylie Minogue; Ian Curnow; Phil Harding	Greatest Remix Hits 4 (Note: "I Am the One for You", an unreleased song from Rhythm of Love (1990), was included in the 1998 compilation Greatest Remix Hits 4.)	1998	
"I Believe in You"	Kylie Minogue	Kylie Minogue; Jake Shears; Scott Hoffman	Ultimate Kylie	2004	
"I Don't Know What It Is"	Kylie Minogue	Kylie Minogue; Julian Peake; Paul Harris; Richard Stannard; Rob Davis	B-side to "2 Hearts" †	2007	
"I Don't Need Anyone"	Kylie Minogue	Kylie Minogue; James Dean Bradfield; Nick Jones	Impossible Princess	1997	
"I Feel For You"	Kylie Minogue	Jason Piccioni; Liz Winstanley; Stefano Anselmetti	Body Language	2003	
"I Guess I Like It Like That"	Kylie Minogue	Kylie Minogue; Mike Stock; Pete Waterman; Phil Wilde; Jean-Paul de Coster (Note: "I Guess I Like It Like That" contains elements of "Get Ready For This", written by Phil Wilde, Jean-Paul de Coster and Ray Slijngaard, performed by 2 Unlimited.)	Let's Get to It	1991	
"I Miss You"	Kylie Minogue	Mike Stock; Matt Aitken; Pete Waterman	Kylie	1988	
"I Love It"	Kylie Minogue	Kylie Minogue; Biff Stannard; Duck Blackwell	Disco	2020	
"I Should Be So Lucky"	Kylie Minogue	Mike Stock; Matt Aitken; Pete Waterman	Kylie	1987	
"I Talk Too Much"	Just Jack featuring Kylie Minogue	Jack Allsopp	Overtones	2007	
"I Was Gonna Cancel"	Kylie Minogue	Pharrell Williams	Kiss Me Once	2014	
"I Wish It Could Be Christmas Everyday"	Kylie Minogue	Roy Wood	Kylie Christmas: Snow Queen Edition	2016	
"If I Can't Have You"	Kylie and Garibay featuring Sam Sparro	Fernando Garibay; Sam Sparro; Brian Lee	Kylie + Garibay	2015	
"If I Was Your Lover"	Kylie Minogue	Jimmy Harry	Kylie Minogue	1994	
"If Only"	Kylie Minogue	Ariel Rechtshaid; Justin Raisen; Dan Nigro	Kiss Me Once	2014	
"If You Don't Love Me"	Kylie Minogue	Paddy McAloon	B-side to "Confide in Me" †	1994	
"If You Were with Me Now"	Kylie Minogue and Keith Washington	Kylie Minogue; Mike Stock; Pete Waterman; Keith Washington	Let's Get to It	1991	
"I'll Still Be Loving You"	Kylie Minogue	Mike Stock; Matt Aitken; Pete Waterman	Kylie	1988	
"Illusion"	Kylie Minogue	Kylie Minogue; Stuart Price	Aphrodite	2010	
"I'm Gonna Be Warm This Winter"	Kylie Minogue	Hank Hunter; Mark Barkan	Kylie Christmas	2015	
"I'm Over Dreaming (Over You)"	Kylie Minogue	Mike Stock; Matt Aitken; Pete Waterman	Enjoy Yourself	1989	
"I'm So High"	Kylie Minogue	Kylie Minogue; Guy Chambers; Megan Smith	Light Years	2000	
"In Denial"	Pet Shop Boys and Kylie Minogue	Neil Tennant; Chris Lowe	Nightlife	1999	
"In My Arms" (Note: Aleks Syntek recorded a Spanish duet version of the song, which was later included in the Mexican edition of X (2008). An alternate version of the song, featuring Jolin Tsai, was also included in the Chinese edition in 2007.) †	Kylie Minogue	Kylie Minogue; Calvin Harris; Richard Stannard; Paul Harris; Julian Peake	X	2007	
"In Your Eyes"	Kylie Minogue	Kylie Minogue; Richard Stannard; Julian Gallagher; Ash Howes	Fever	2001	
"Into the Blue"	Kylie Minogue	Kelly Sheehan; Mike Del Rio; Jacob Kasher Hindlin	Kiss Me Once	2014	
"It's the Most Wonderful Time of the Year"	Kylie Minogue	Edward Pola; George Wyle	Kylie Christmas	2015	
"It's No Secret"	Kylie Minogue	Mike Stock; Matt Aitken; Pete Waterman	Kylie	1988	
"Je ne sais pas pourquoi"	Kylie Minogue	Mike Stock; Matt Aitken; Pete Waterman	Kylie	1988	
"Jump"	Kylie Minogue	Kylie Minogue; Rob Dougan	Impossible Princess	1997	
"Just Imagine"	Kylie Minogue	Carl Ryden; Karen Poole	Tension	2023	
"Just Wanna Love You"	Kylie Minogue	Mike Stock; Matt Aitken; Pete Waterman	B-side to "Hand on Your Heart" †	1989	
"Keep on Pumpin' It"	Visionmasters & Tony King featuring Kylie Minogue	Kylie Minogue; Mike Stock; Pete Waterman (Note: "Keep on Pumpin' It" contains a sample of "I Guess I Like It Like That", written by Kylie Minogue, Mike Stock, and Pete Waterman.)	Non-album single	1991	
"Kids"	Kylie Minogue and Robbie Williams	Robert Williams; Guy Chambers	Sing When You're Winning and Light Years (Note: Williams and Minogue re-recorded the song in 2022 for Williams's album XXV.)	2000	
"King or Queen"	Kylie Minogue	Kylie Minogue; Greg Kurstin; Karen Poole	B-side to "2 Hearts" †	2007	
"Kiss Bang Bang"	Kylie Minogue	Kylie Minogue; Oliver Peterhof; Neave Applebaum; Alna Hofmeyr; James Norton	Tension II	2024	
"Kiss Me Once"	Kylie Minogue	Sia; Dsign Music	Kiss Me Once	2014	
"Kiss of Life"	Kylie Minogue and Jessie Ware	Kylie Minogue; Jessie Ware; James Ford; Danny Parker; Alexandra Shungudzo	Disco: Guest List Edition	2021	
"Koocachoo"	Kylie Minogue	Kylie Minogue; Johnny Douglas	Light Years	2000	
"Last Chance"	Kylie Minogue	Kylie Minogue; Maegan Cottone; Sky Adams	Disco	2020	
"Last Night I Dreamt I Fell in Love"	Alok and Kylie Minogue	Alok; Kylie Minogue; OHYES; Avedon; Sarah Hudson; JHart; Zhone	Non-album single	2025	
"Lazy"	The Vaccines and Kylie Minogue	Cole Greif-Neill; Justin Young; Freddie Cowan; Timothy Lanham; Yoann Intonti; Árni Árnason	A Shaun the Sheep Movie: Farmageddon	2019	
"Les Sex"	Kylie Minogue	Amanda Warner; Peter Wade Keusch; Joshua Walker; William Rappaport; Henri Lanz	Kiss Me Once	2014	
"Let It Snow"	Kylie Minogue	Sammy Cahn; Jule Styne	A Kylie Christmas (Note: "Santa Baby" was recorded as the B-side to "Please Stay" single in 2000, while "Let It Snow" was first released in A Kylie Christmas in 2010. Both tracks were later included in Kylie Christmas (2015), with "Let It Snow" being the only re-recorded song of the two.)	2010	
"Let's Get to It"	Kylie Minogue	Mike Stock; Pete Waterman	Let's Get to It	1991	
"Lhuna"	Kylie Minogue and Coldplay	Guy Berryman; Jonny Buckland; Will Champion; Chris Martin	Non-album single	2008	
"A Lifetime to Repair"	Kylie Minogue	Kylie Minogue; Sky Adams; Danny Shah	Golden	2018	
"Lights Camera Action"	Kylie Minogue	Kylie Minogue; Lewis Thompson; Ina Wroldsen	Tension II	2024	
"Light Up"	Kylie Minogue	Kylie Minogue; Chris Martin; Luke Fitton; Richard Stannard; Duck Blackwell	Non-album single	2026	
"Light Years"	Kylie Minogue	Kylie Minogue; Richard Stannard; Julian Gallagher	Light Years	2000	
"Like a Drug"	Kylie Minogue	Mich Hansen; Jonas Jeberg; Engelina Andrina; Adam Powers (Note: "Like a Drug" contains a sample of "Fade To Grey", written by Billy Currie, Chris Payne and Midge Ure, performed by Visage.)	X	2007	
"Limbo"	Kylie Minogue	Kylie Minogue; Dave Ball; Ingo Vauk	Impossible Princess	1997	
"Limpido"	Laura Pausini featuring Kylie Minogue	Laura Pausini; Virginio Simonelli	20 – The Greatest Hits	2013	
"Live a Little"	Kylie Minogue	Kylie Minogue; Sky Adams; Danny Shah	Golden	2018	
"Live and Learn"	Kylie Minogue	Kylie Minogue; Mike Stock; Pete Waterman	Let's Get to It	1991	
"The Loco-Motion" (Note: Minogue first released a cover version of the song, under the title "Locomotion", as her debut single in July 1987, by Mushroom Records. After signing with PWL Records in 1988, she re-recorded the song with producers Stock Aitken & Waterman, titled "The Loco-Motion", which was later included in her debut album Kylie.)	Kylie Minogue	Gerry Goffin; Carole King	Kylie	1987	
"Look My Way"	Kylie Minogue	Mike Stock; Matt Aitken; Pete Waterman	Kylie	1988	
"Looking for an Angel"	Kylie Minogue	Kylie Minogue; Stuart Price	Aphrodite	2010	
"Lost Without You"	Kylie Minogue	Kylie Minogue; Jonathan Green	Golden	2018	
"Love"	Kylie Minogue	Kylie Minogue; Mich Hansen; Daniel Heløy Davidsen; Peter Wallevik; Wayne Hector; Autumn Rowe	Golden	2018	
"Love Affair"	Kylie Minogue	Kylie Minogue; Richard Stannard; Julian Gallagher	Fever	2001	
"Love at First Sight"	Kylie Minogue	Mike Stock; Matt Aitken; Pete Waterman	Kylie	1988	
"Love at First Sight"	Kylie Minogue	Kylie Minogue; Julian Gallagher; Richard Stannard; Martin Harrington; Ash Howes	Fever	2001	
"Love Is the Drug"	Kylie Minogue	Bryan Ferry; Andy Mackay	Radio 1 Established 1967	2007	
"Love Is Waiting"	Kylie Minogue	Mike Percy; Tim Lever; Tracy Ackerman	Kylie Minogue	1994	
"Love Sensation" (Afterhours mix)	Madonna and Kylie Minogue	Madonna; Stuart Price	Non-album single	2026	
"Love Takes Over Me"	Kylie Minogue	Kylie Minogue; Steve Anderson; Dave Seaman	B-side to "Some Kind of Bliss" †	1997	
"Love Train"	Kylie Minogue	Kylie Minogue; Sky Adams; Maegan Cottone	Tension	2023	
"Loveboat"	Kylie Minogue	Kylie Minogue; Guy Chambers; Robbie Williams	Light Years	2000	
"Loving Days"	Kylie Minogue	Kylie Minogue; Richard Stannard; Julian Gallagher	Body Language	2003	
"Low Blow"	Kylie Minogue	Kylie Minogue; Danny Shah; Sky Adams; Steve McEwan	Golden	2018	
"Made in Heaven"	Kylie Minogue	Mike Stock; Matt Aitken; Pete Waterman	B-side to "Je ne sais pas pourquoi" †	1988	
"Made of Glass"	Kylie Minogue	Kylie Minogue; Brian Higgins; Tim Powell; Lisa Cowling; Miranda Cooper; Matt Gray	B-side to "Giving You Up" †	2005	
"Magic"	Kylie Minogue	Kylie Minogue; Michelle Buzz; Daniel Heløy Davidsen; Peter Wallevik; Teemu Brunila	Disco	2020	
"Magnetic Electric"	Kylie Minogue	Kylie Minogue; Karen Poole; Greg Kurstin	X	2007	
"Marry the Night"	Kylie Minogue	Lady Gaga; Fernando Garibay	Born This Way The Tenth Anniversary	2021	
"Matesong"	Kylie Minogue	Eddie Perfect	None (Note: "Matesong" was used in a campaign for Tourism Australia in 2019, which was aired on televisions in the United Kingdom before the Queen's message on Christmas Day.)	2019	
"Midnight Ride"	Orville Peck, Kylie Minogue and Diplo	Kylie Minogue; Orville Peck; Christopher Stracey; Marta Cikojevic	Stampede; Tension II	2024	
"Mighty Rivers"	Kylie Minogue	Jaxon Bellina; Carla Marie Williams; Miranda Cooper; Brian Higgins; Gerard O'Connell; Jason Resch; Tim Deal	Aphrodite	2010	
"Million Miles"	Kylie Minogue	Chelcee Grimes; Daniel Heløy Davidsen; Peter Wallevik; Mich Hansen	Kiss Me Once	2014	
"Miss a Thing"	Kylie Minogue	Kylie Minogue; Ally Ahern; Teemu Brunila; Nico Stadi	Disco	2020	
"Monday Blues"	Kylie Minogue	Kylie Minogue; Linslee Campbell; Maegan Cottone; Daniel Shah; Skylar Adams	Disco	2020	
"Monkey Man"	Kylie Minogue and The Wiggles	Toots Hibbert	Go Bananas!	2009	
"More More More"	Kylie Minogue	Tommy Danvers; Liz Winstanley	Fever	2001	
"Mr. President"	Kylie Minogue	Kylie Minogue; Kelly Sheehan; Jacob Kasher Hindlin	Kiss Me Once	2014	
"Music's Too Sad Without You"	Kylie Minogue with Jack Savoretti	Kylie Minogue; Jack Savoretti; Samuel Dixon	Golden	2018	
"My Oh My"	Kylie Minogue, Bebe Rexha and Tove Lo	Steve Mac; Ina Wroldsen; Tove Lo	Tension II	2024	
"My Secret Heart"	Kylie Minogue	Mike Stock; Matt Aitken; Pete Waterman	Enjoy Yourself	1989	
"Never Spoken"	Kylie Minogue	Kylie Minogue; Steve Anderson	B-side to "In Your Eyes" †	2001	
"New York City"	Kylie Minogue	Kylie Minogue; Daniel Stein; Karen Poole; Myles MacInnes (Note: Before appearing in Step Back in Time: The Definitive Collection, "New York City" was an unreleased song written during sessions for Golden. The song contains a sample of "Drop the Pressure", written and produced by Myles MacInnes.)	Step Back in Time: The Definitive Collection	2019	
"Never Too Late"	Kylie Minogue	Mike Stock; Matt Aitken; Pete Waterman	Enjoy Yourself	1989	
"Night Fever"	Kylie Minogue	Barry Gibb; Robin Gibb; Maurice Gibb	Kylie Christmas: Snow Queen Edition	2016	
"No More Rain"	Kylie Minogue	Kylie Minogue; Karen Poole; Christian Karlsson; Pontus Winnberg; Jonas Quant	X	2007	
"No World Without You"	Kylie Minogue	Kylie Minogue; Mike Stock; Pete Waterman	Let's Get to It	1991	
"Nothing Can Stop Us"	Kylie Minogue	Bob Stanley; Pete Wiggs	B-side to "Confide in Me" †	1994	
"Nothing to Lose"	Kylie Minogue	Mike Stock; Matt Aitken; Pete Waterman	Enjoy Yourself	1989	
"Nu-di-ty"	Kylie Minogue	Karen Poole; Christian Karlsson; Pontus Winnberg	X	2007	
"Obsession"	Kylie Minogue	Kurtis el Khaleel; David Billing; Mim Grey	Body Language	2003	
"Ocean Blue"	Kylie Minogue	Kylie Minogue; Steve Anderson	B-side to "On a Night Like This" †	2000	
"Office Party"	Kylie Minogue	Kylie Minogue; Duck Blackwell; Luke Fitton; Richard Stannard	Kylie Christmas (Fully Wrapped)	2025	
"Off with His Shirt"	Kylie Minogue	Alan Menkin; Glenn Slater	Galavant: Season 2 (Original Soundtrack)	2016	
"Oh Santa"	Kylie Minogue	Kylie Minogue; Ash Howes; Richard Stannard; Steve Anderson	Kylie Christmas	2015	
"On a Night Like This"	Kylie Minogue	Steve Torch; Graham Stack; Mark Taylor; Brian Rawling	Light Years	2000	
"On oublie le reste"	Jenifer featuring Kylie Minogue	Boban Apostolov; Manon Palmer; Barbara Pravi; Corson (Note: "On oublie le reste" was released in October 2019 as part of the extended edition of Jenifer's 2018 studio album Nouvelle Page. It contains an interpolation of "Can't Get You Out of My Head".)	Nouvelle Page	2019	
"One Boy Girl"	Kylie Minogue	Kylie Minogue; Willie Wilcox	Rhythm of Love	1990	
"One Last Kiss"	Kylie Minogue	Kylie Minogue; Ash Howes; Richard Stannard	Golden	2018	
"One More Time"	Kylie Minogue	Kylie Minogue; Richard Stannard; Duck Blackwell; Jon Green	Tension	2023	
"The One"	Kylie Minogue	Kylie Minogue; Richard Stannard; James Wiltshire; Russell Small; John Andersson; Johan Emmoth; Emma Holmgren	X	2007	
"Only You"	Kylie Minogue featuring James Corden	Vince Clarke	Kylie Christmas	2015	
"The Other Boys"	Nervo featuring Kylie Minogue, Jake Shears and Nile Rodgers	Miriam Nervo; Miriam Nervo; Nile Rodgers; Fred Falke	Collateral	2015	
"Padam Padam"	Kylie Minogue	Ina Wroldsen; Peter Rycroft	Tension	2023	
"Paper Dolls"	Kylie Minogue	Kylie Minogue; Steve Anderson	B-side to "Spinning Around" †	2000	
"Password"	Kylie Minogue	Kylie Minogue; Johnny Douglas	Light Years	2000	
"Physical"	Kylie Minogue	Steve Kipner; Terry Shaddick	Light Years	2001	
"Please Stay"	Kylie Minogue	Kylie Minogue; Richard Stannard; Julian Gallagher; John Themis	Light Years	2000	
"Promises"	Kylie Minogue	Kurtis el Khaleel; David Billing	Body Language	2003	
"Put Your Hands Up (If You Feel Love)"	Kylie Minogue	Finlay Dow-Smith; Miriam Nervo; Miriam Nervo	Aphrodite	2010	
"Put Yourself in My Place"	Kylie Minogue	Jimmy Harry	Kylie Minogue	1994	
"Radio On"	Kylie Minogue	Kylie Minogue; Amy Wadge; Jonathan Green	Golden	2018	
"Raining Glitter"	Kylie Minogue	Kylie Minogue; Alex Smith; Mark Taylor; Francis White	Golden	2018	
"The Real Thing"	Kylie Minogue	Johnny Young	Sample People	2000	
"Real Groove"	Kylie Minogue	Kylie Minogue; Alida Gaprestad; Teemu Brunila; Nico Stadi	Disco	2020	
"Really Don't Like U"	Tove Lo featuring Kylie Minogue	Tove Lo; Caroline Ailin; Ian Kirkpatrick	Sunshine Kitty	2019	
"Red Blooded Woman"	Kylie Minogue	Johnny Douglas; Karen Poole	Body Language	2003	
"The Reflex"	Kylie Minogue and Ben Lee	Simon Le Bon; John Taylor; Roger Taylor; Andy Taylor; Nick Rhodes	Undone: The Songs of Duran Duran	1999	
"Rendezvous at Sunset"	Kylie Minogue	Kylie Minogue; Julian Gallagher; Richard Stannard; Martin Harrington; Ash Howes; Ben Chapman	B-side to "Can't Get You Out of My Head" †	2001	
"Rhythm of Love"	Kylie Minogue	Kylie Minogue; Stephen Bray	Rhythm of Love	1990	
"Right Here, Right Now"	Kylie Minogue	Kylie Minogue; Mike Stock; Pete Waterman	Let's Get to It	1991	
"Right Here, Right Now"	Giorgio Moroder featuring Kylie Minogue	Giorgio Moroder; Patrick Jordan-Patrikios; Karen Poole; David Etherington	Déjà Vu	2015	
"Rippin' Up the Disco"	Kylie Minogue	Mich Hansen; Jonas Jeberg; Jasmine Baird	X	2007	
"Rollin'"	Kylie Minogue	Kylie Minogue; Amy Wadge; Sky Adams	Golden	2018	
"Santa Baby"	Kylie Minogue	Joan Javits; Philip Springer; Tony Springer	B-side to "Please Stay" †	2000	
"Santa Claus Is Coming to Town"	Kylie Minogue featuring Frank Sinatra	John Frederick Coots; Haven Gillespie	Kylie Christmas	2015	
"Say Hey"	Kylie Minogue	Kylie Minogue	Impossible Princess	1997	
"Say Something"	Kylie Minogue	Kylie Minogue; Ash Howes; Biff Stannard; Jon Green	Disco	2020	
"Say the Word – I'll Be There"	Kylie Minogue	Kylie Minogue; Mike Stock; Pete Waterman	B-side to "Word Is Out" †	1991	
"A Second to Midnight"	Kylie Minogue and Years & Years	Kylie Minogue; Olly Alexander; Duck Blackwell; Martin Sjølie; Richard Stannard	Disco: Guest List Edition and Night Call	2021	
"Secret (Take You Home)"	Kylie Minogue	Reza Safinia; Lisa Greene; Niomi McLean-Daley; Hugh Clarke; Paul George; Gerard Charles; Brian P. George; Curtis T. Bedeau; Lucien J. George (Note: "Secret (Take You Home)" contains an interpolation of "I Wonder If I Take You Home", written by Hugh Clarke, Paul George, Gerard Charles, Brian P. George, Curtis T. Bedeau, and Lucien J. George, performed by Lisa Lisa and Cult Jam.)	Body Language	2003	
"Secrets"	Kylie Minogue	Mike Stock; Matt Aitken; Pete Waterman	Rhythm of Love	1990	
"Sensitized"	Kylie Minogue	Guy Chambers; Cathy Dennis; Serge Gainsbourg (Note: "Sensitized" contains samples of "Bonnie and Clyde", written by Serge Gainsbourg, performed by Serge Gainsbourg and Brigitte Bardot; and "Requiem pour un Con", written and performed by Serge Gainsbourg.)	X	2007	
"Sexercize"	Kylie Minogue	Sia; Marcus Lomax; Jordan Johnson; Stefan Johnson; Clarence Coffee; Nella Tahrini	Kiss Me Once	2014	
"Sexy Love"	Kylie Minogue	Wayne Hector; Autumn Rowe; Peter Wallevik; Daniel Heløy Davidsen; Mich Hansen	Kiss Me Once	2014	
"Shelby '68"	Kylie Minogue	Kylie Minogue; Ash Howes; Richard Stannard	Golden	2018	
"Shocked"	Kylie Minogue	Mike Stock; Matt Aitken; Pete Waterman	Rhythm of Love	1990	
"Shoulda Left Ya"	Kylie Minogue	Kylie Minogue; Biff Stannard; Gez O'Connell; Duck Blackwell	Tension II	2024	
"Should I Stay or Should I Go"	Jools Holland featuring Kylie Minogue	Topper Headon; Mick Jones; Paul Simonon; Joe Strummer	Sirens of Song	2014	
"Silence"	Kylie Minogue	Stuart Price	B-side to "Put Your Hands Up (If You Feel Love)" †	2011	
"Sincerely Yours"	Kylie Minogue	Kylie Minogue; Jesse Frasure; Amy Wadge	Golden	2018	
"Skirt"	Kylie Minogue	Kylie Minogue; Chris Elliot; Chris Lake; Terius Nash	Non-album single	2013	
"Sleeping with the Enemy"	Kylie Minogue	Claude Kelly; Greg Kurstin	Kiss Me Once	2014	
"Slow"	Kylie Minogue	Kylie Minogue; Dan Carey; Emilíana Torrini	Body Language	2003	
"Slow Motion"	Kylie Minogue	Kylie Minogue; Andrew Frampton; Mark Stent; Wayne Wilkins	Body Language	2003	
"So in Love with Yourself" #	Dannii Minogue	Paul Barry; Mark Taylor; Steve Torch	Girl	1997	
"So Now Goodbye"	Kylie Minogue	Kylie Minogue; Steve Anderson	Light Years	2000	
"Some Kind of Bliss"	Kylie Minogue	Kylie Minogue; James Dean Bradfield; Sean Moore	Impossible Princess	1997	
"Somebody to Love"	Kylie Minogue	Kylie Minogue; Richard Stannard; Duck Blackwell; Jon Green	Tension	2023	
"Someday"	Kylie Minogue	Kylie Minogue; Emilíana Torrini; Ash Thomas	Body Language	2003	
"Someone for Me"	Kylie Minogue	Peter Rycroft; Sarah Hudson; Brett McLaughlin; Pablo Bowman; Kevin Hickey	Tension II	2024	
"Sometime Samurai"	Towa Tei featuring Kylie Minogue	Towa Tei; Kylie Minogue	Flash	2005	
"Soul on Fire"	Kylie Minogue	Kylie Minogue; Dan Carey; Emilíana Torrini	B-side to "Slow" †	2003	
"Sparks"	Kylie Minogue	Karen Poole; Matt Schwartz	B-side to "Into the Blue" †	2014	
"Speakerphone"	Kylie Minogue	Christian Karlsson; Pontus Winnberg; Henrik Jonback; Klas Åhlund	X	2007	
"Spinning Around"	Kylie Minogue	Ira Shickman; Osborne Bingham; Kara DioGuardi; Paula Abdul	Light Years	2000	
"Spotlight"	Kylie Minogue	Kylie Minogue; Daniel Shah; Kiris Houston; Skylar Adams	Disco	2020	
"Stars"	Kylie Minogue	Kylie Minogue; Richard Stannard; Paul Harris; Julian Peake	X	2007	
"Starstruck (Kylie Minogue Remix)"	Years & Years featuring Kylie Minogue	Clarence Coffee Jr. Mark Ralph; Nathaniel Ledwidge; Olly Alexander	Night Call	2021	
"Stateside + Kylie Minogue"	PinkPantheress featuring Kylie Minogue	PinkPantheress; Caroline Ailin; Harrison Patrick Smith; Karen Poole	Non-album single	2025	
"Stay Another Day"	Kylie Minogue	Tony Mortimer; Rob Kean; Dominic Hawken	Kylie Christmas: Snow Queen Edition	2016	
"Stay This Way"	Kylie Minogue	Kylie Minogue; Steve Anderson	Hits+	2000	
"Step Back in Time"	Kylie Minogue	Mike Stock; Matt Aitken; Pete Waterman (Note: "Step Back in Time" contains uncredited samples of "Hot Pants – I'm Coming, Coming, I'm Coming", written by James Brown, performed by Bobby Byrd; and "Give Up the Funk (Let's Dance)", written by B. T. Express and Carlos Ward, performed by B. T. Express.)	Rhythm of Love	1990	
"Still Feels Like the First Time"	Zoot Woman featuring Kylie Minogue	Kylie Minogue; Adam Blake; Johnny Blake; Stuart Price	Absence	2017	
"Still Standing"	Kylie Minogue	Ash Thomas; Alexis Strum	Body Language	2003	
"Stop Crying Your Heart Out"	BBC Radio 2 Allstars	Noel Gallagher	Non-album single	2020	
"Stop Me from Falling" (Note: "Stop Me from Falling" was remixed into a collaboration with Cuban musical duo Gente de Zona, and digitally released in April 2018.)	Kylie Minogue	Kylie Minogue; Sky Adams; Steve McEwan; Danny Shah	Golden	2018	
"Story"	Kylie Minogue	Kylie Minogue; Richard Stannard; Duck Blackwell; Jon Green	Tension	2023	
"Supernova"	Kylie Minogue	Kylie Minogue; Maegan Cottone; Skylar Adams	Disco	2020	
"Surrender"	Kylie Minogue	Gerry DeVeaux; Charlie Mole	Kylie Minogue	1994	
"Sweet Music"	Kylie Minogue	Kylie Minogue; Ash Thomas; Karen Poole	Body Language	2003	
"Taboo"	Kylie Minogue	Steve Mac; Ina Wroldsen	Tension II	2024	
"Take Me with You"	Kylie Minogue	Kylie Minogue; Steve Anderson	Other Sides	1997	
"Tears"	Kylie Minogue	Kylie Minogue; Dave Ball; Ingo Vauk	B-side to "Did It Again" †	1997	
"Tears on My Pillow"	Kylie Minogue	Sylvester Bradford; Al Lewis	Enjoy Yourself	1989	
"Tell Tale Signs"	Kylie Minogue	Mike Stock; Matt Aitken; Pete Waterman	Enjoy Yourself	1989	
"Tension"	Kylie Minogue	Kylie Minogue; Anya Jones; Camille Purcell; Jon Green; Richard Stannard; Duck Blackwell	Tension	2023	
"The Magic Roundabout"	Kylie Minogue, Andrea Remanda and Goldust	Andrea Remanda; Jon O'Mahony; Michael Harwood; Nick Keynes	Doogal (Music From The Motion Picture)	2005	
"Things Can Only Get Better"	Kylie Minogue	Mike Stock; Matt Aitken; Pete Waterman	Rhythm of Love	1990	
"Things We Do for Love"	Kylie Minogue	Kylie Minogue; Kamille; Richard Stannard; Duck Blackwell; Jon Green; Anya Jones	Tension	2023	
"This Girl"	Kylie Minogue	Kylie Minogue; Uschi Classen	Impossible Princess	1997	
"This Time of Year"	Kylie Minogue	Kylie Minogue; Duck Blackwell; Luke Fitton; Richard Stannard	Kylie Christmas (Fully Wrapped)	2025	
"This Wheel's on Fire"	Kylie Minogue	Bob Dylan; Rick Danko	Absolutely Fabulous	2016	
"Through the Years"	Kylie Minogue	Kylie Minogue; Dave Ball; Ingo Vauk	Impossible Princess	1997	
"Tightrope"	Kylie Minogue	Kylie Minogue; Pascal Gabriel; Paul Statham	B-side to "In Your Eyes" †	2001	
"Till You Love Somebody"	Kylie Minogue	Kylie Minogue; Linslee Campbell; Skylar Adams; Teemu Brunila	Disco	2020	
"Time Will Pass You By"	Kylie Minogue	Dino Fekaris; Nick Zesses; John Rhys	Kylie Minogue	1994	
"Timebomb"	Kylie Minogue	Karen Poole; Paul Harris; Matt Schwartz	Non-album single	2012	
"Too Far"	Kylie Minogue	Kylie Minogue	Impossible Princess	1997	
"Too Much"	Kylie Minogue	Kylie Minogue; Calvin Harris; Jake Shears	Aphrodite	2010	
"Too Much of a Good Thing"	Kylie Minogue	Kylie Minogue; Mike Stock; Pete Waterman	Let's Get to It	1991	
"Turn It into Love"	Kylie Minogue	Mike Stock; Matt Aitken; Pete Waterman	Kylie	1988	
"Under the Influence of Love"	Kylie Minogue	Paul Politi; Barry White	Light Years	2000	
"Unstoppable"	Kylie Minogue	Kylie Minogue; Fiona Bevan; Troy Miller	Disco	2020	
"Vegas High"	Kylie Minogue	Kylie Minogue; Richard Stannard; Duck Blackwell; Gez O'Connell	Tension	2023	
"Visiting Hours" #	Ed Sheeran	Amy Wadge; Ant Clemons; Ed Sheeran; Johnny McDaid; Kim Lang Smith; Michael Pollack; Scott Carter	=	2021	
"Voices"	Jake Shears featuring Kylie Minogue	Jason Sellards; Oliver Goldstein; Kylie Minogue; Vaughn Oliver	Last Man Dancing	2023	
"Wait"	Kylie and Garibay	Peter Wade Keusch; Fernando Garibay; Amanda Warner	Sleepwalker	2014	
"We Are One"	Kylie Minogue and Verbal	Verbal	Non-album single	2011	
"We Know the Meaning of Love"	Kylie Minogue	Mike Stock; Matt Aitken; Pete Waterman	B-side to "Tears on My Pillow" †	1990	
"What Do I Have to Do"	Kylie Minogue	Mike Stock; Matt Aitken; Pete Waterman	Rhythm of Love	1990	
"What Kind of Fool (Heard All That Before)"	Kylie Minogue	Kylie Minogue; Mike Stock; Pete Waterman	Greatest Hits	1992	
"What You Waiting For"	Sigala featuring Kylie Minogue	Bruce Fielder; Gina Kushka; Jason Pebworth; George Astasio; Jonathan Shave	Brighter Days	2018	
"Whenever You Feel Like It"	Kylie Minogue	Kylie Minogue; Billy Steinberg; Rick Nowels	Scooby-Doo: Music from the Motion Picture	2002	
"Where Does the DJ Go?"	Kylie Minogue	Kylie Minogue; Daniel Shah; Skylar Adams; Kiris Houston	Disco	2020	
"Where Has the Love Gone?"	Kylie Minogue	Alex Palmer; Julie Stapleton	Kylie Minogue	1994	
"Where in the World?"	Kylie Minogue	Kylie Minogue; Mike Stock; Pete Waterman	Greatest Hits	1992	
"Where Is the Feeling?"	Kylie Minogue	Wilf Smarties; Jayn Hanna	Kylie Minogue	1994	
"Where the Wild Roses Grow"	Nick Cave and the Bad Seeds and Kylie Minogue	Nick Cave	Murder Ballads	1995	
"Whistle"	Kylie Minogue and múm	Gunnar Örn Tynes; Örvar Smárason	Jack & Diane: Music from the Motion Picture	2013	
"White December"	Kylie Minogue	Kylie Minogue; Karen Poole; Matt Prime	Kylie Christmas	2015	
"White Diamond"	Kylie Minogue	Guy Chambers; Scott Hoffman; Jake Shears	X	2007	
"The Winner Takes It All"	Kylie Minogue and Dannii Minogue	Benny Andersson; Björn Ulvaeus	Beautiful People: Soundtrack To The Hit BBC Series	2008	
"Winter Wonderland"	Kylie Minogue	Felix Bernard; Richard B. Smith	Kylie Christmas	2015	
"Wonderful Christmastime"	Kylie Minogue with Mika	Paul McCartney	Kylie Christmas: Snow Queen Edition	2016	
"Wonderful Life"	Kylie Minogue	Theo Hutchcraft; Adam Anderson; Joseph Cross	Radio 1's Live Lounge – Volume 5	2010	
"Word Is Out"	Kylie Minogue	Mike Stock; Pete Waterman	Let's Get to It	1991	
"The World Still Turns"	Kylie Minogue	Kylie Minogue; Michael Jay; Mark Leggett	Rhythm of Love	1990	
"A World Without Music"	Hearing Aid	Ricky May; Peter Sullivan; Jim Burnett	Non-album single	1985	
"Wouldn't Change a Thing"	Kylie Minogue	Mike Stock; Matt Aitken; Pete Waterman	Enjoy Yourself	1989	
"Wow"	Kylie Minogue	Kylie Minogue; Karen Poole; Greg Kurstin	X	2007	
"XMAS"	Kylie Minogue	Kylie Minogue; Duck Blackwell; Luke Fitton; Richard Stannard	Kylie Christmas (Fully Wrapped)	2025	
"You Make Me Feel"	Kylie Minogue	Kylie Minogue; Tommy Danvers; Felix Howard; Marius de Vries	Body Language	2003	
"You Still Get Me High"	Kylie Minogue	Kylie Minogue; Richard Stannard; Jon Green	Tension	2023	
"Your Body"	Kylie and Garibay featuring Giorgio Moroder	Kylie Minogue; Jamie Hartman; Whitney Phillips; Fernando Garibay; Max McElligott	Kylie + Garibay	2015	
"Your Disco Needs You" (Note: Minogue recorded a Japanese, Spanish, and German version of "Your Disco Needs You".)	Kylie Minogue	Kylie Minogue; Guy Chambers; Robbie Williams	Light Years	2000	
"Your Love"	Kylie Minogue	Kylie Minogue; Pascal Gabriel; Paul Statham	Fever	2001	
