= Right Here, Right Now (Giorgio Moroder song) =

2015 single by Giorgio Moroder

Single by Giorgio Moroder featuring Kylie Minogue

from the album Déjà Vu
- Released: 20 January 2015
- Recorded: 2014
- Genre: Dance-pop; electropop; club; disco
- Length: 3:30
- Label: Sony Music
- Songwriters: Giorgio Moroder; Patrick Jordan-Patrikios; Karen Poole; David Etherington
- Producers: Moroder; Jordan-Patrikios

Giorgio Moroder singles chronology
"74 Is the New 24" (2014)	"Right Here, Right Now" (2015)	"Déjà Vu" (2015)

Kylie Minogue singles chronology
"Crystallize" (2014)	"Right Here, Right Now" (2015)	"The Other Boys" (2015)

Music video
- "Right Here, Right Now" on YouTube

"Right Here, Right Now" is a song recorded by Italian producer Giorgio Moroder featuring Kylie Minogue from Moroder's fourteenth studio album, Déjà Vu (2015). The track was made remotely between Los Angeles and London. Moroder wrote the track with Karen Poole, David Etherington, and Patrick Jordan-Patrikios, who also co-produced it with Moroder. The mixing process was handled by Mitch McCarthy. An incorporation of dance-pop, electropop, club, and disco. "Right Here, Right Now" explores themes of romantic connection and living in the moment. The track was digitally released as the second single from Déjà Vu on 20 January 2015.

Music critics praised Moroder's vibrant production and his collaboration with Minogue, although some deemed the track generic. Commercially, "Right Here, Right Now" topped the Los 40 airplay chart in Argentina, while entering several component charts in Europe. In the United States, it marked Moroder's second and Minogue's twelfth number-one on the Billboard Hot Dance Club Songs. Daniel Börjesson directed the song's music video, which premiered on 2 January 2015. It contains kaleidoscopic visuals, alongside appearances from Moroder in his DJ booth and Minogue showcasing choreography. The duo played "Right Here, Right Now" on the Australian leg of Minogue's 2015 Kiss Me Once Tour, before Moroder incorporated it into his own DJ sets.

== Background ==
In 2013, Moroder collaborated with French music duo Daft Punk on "Giorgio by Moroder," a track from their fourth studio album, Random Access Memories. The album went on to win the 2013 Grammy Award for Album of the Year, an honor Moroder shared. This success catalyzed his return to the music industry after decades of maintaining a lower profile. In June 2014, the 74-year-old producer digitally released his first song in 20 years, "Giorgio's Theme". Five months later, Moroder announced his first solo album in over three decades, titled Déjà Vu.

Having received three label offers, Moroder closely reviewed their respective artist rosters before choosing. He eventually signed a worldwide deal with Sony Music International, and RCA Records distributing the album in the United States. "I chose Sony because I thought I could make some good songs with the artists in their catalog; it was a rather complex selection," Moroder recalled. The album took Moroder almost two years to make, and he collaborated with several female vocalists on it, including Australian singer Kylie Minogue on "Right Here, Right Now". Minogue has previously recorded a different song with the same name, from her 1991 studio album Let's Get to It.

== Recording and mixing ==
"Right Here, Right Now" was written by Moroder, Welsh producer Patrick Jordan-Patrikios, English songwriter Karen Poole, and her husband, composer David Etherington. The track was created remotely, with writers and producers collaborating from different locations. Moroder and Jordan-Patrikios produced the song in Los Angeles. Jordan-Patrikios then traveled to London to do the vocal production with Poole. Subsequently, the track returned to Los Angeles for further refinements and was finalized in the studio with Minogue. Moroder noted a significant shift in the working environment due to remote collaboration, leading to the loss of emotional participation and direct involvement that once characterized their work. "Producing music today is very different... There are too many intermediary figures and a direct creative relationship is not established," he explained. The producer, however, praised Minogue as being easy to work with during the recording. "I didn't have to tell her too much what to do... She's so professional", he recalled.

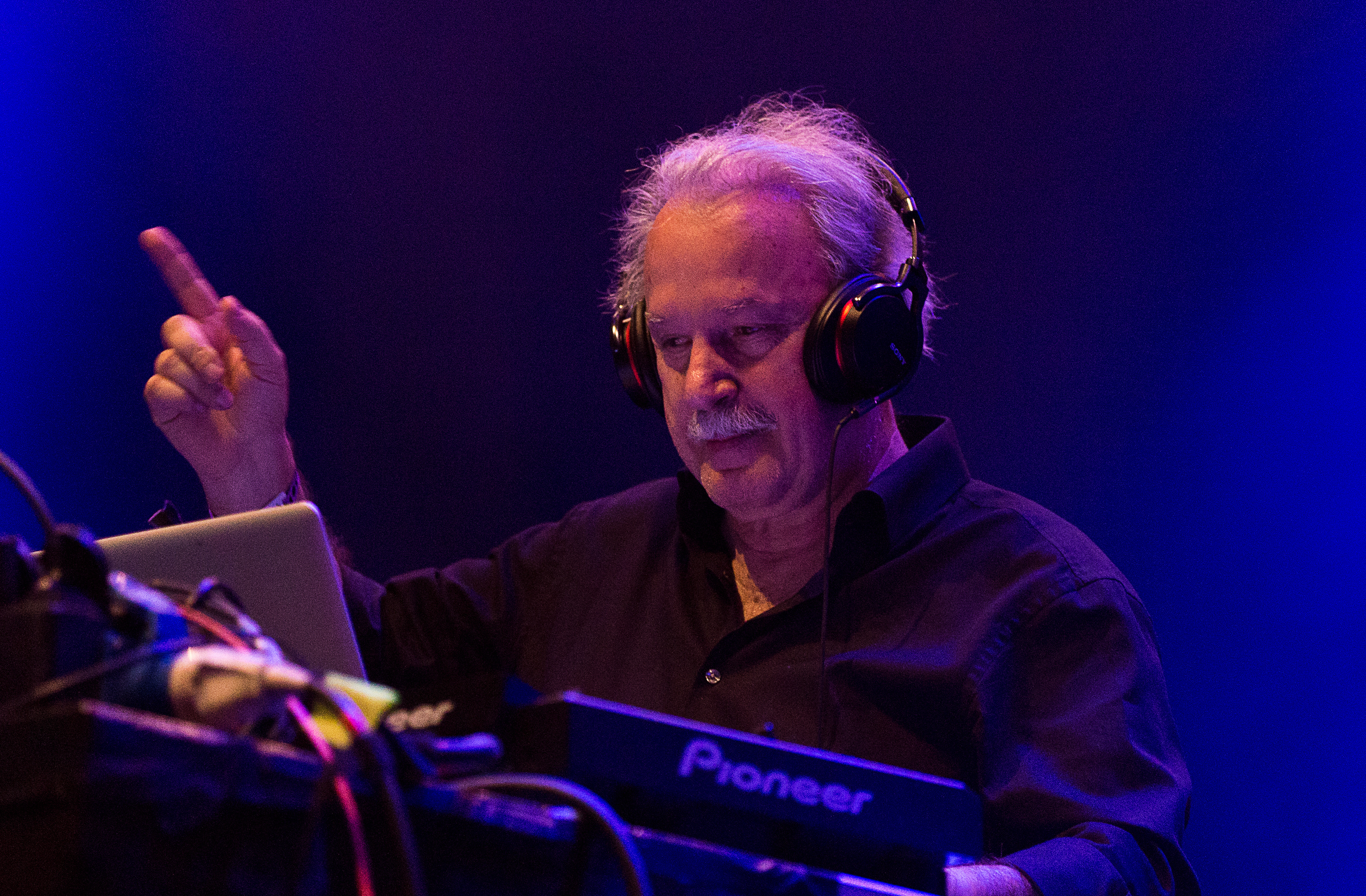
Moroder (pictured in 2015) co-wrote and co-produced "Right Here, Right Now".

The song was mixed by Mitch McCarthy at Owl Foot Ranch, Los Angeles. Michael "Smidi" Smith, Moroder's regular collaborator, served as the album's executive producer. When Smith received a version of "Right Here, Right Now" from the producers, it was nearly complete and required only further refinement. Smith wanted to balance electronic elements with the authenticity of live drums and real Rhodes piano whenever feasible, ensuring a dynamic sound across the album. The live drums were recorded at EastWest Studios, Hollywood. Moroder aimed to use disco electric guitar subtly without dominating the overall sound. To further diversify the album's sonic texture, they intentionally employ a prominent "barky" bass sound as on "Right Here, Right Now". Guitars were recorded at Smith's studio using a clean solid-state amplifier, and processed through Manley preamps. To create his synth sounds, Smith utilizes the reFX Nexus software plug-in for contemporary digital textures, and the Studio Electronics Boomstar 4075 analogue synthesizer, which features an ARP 2600-style filter, for classic analogue tones.

Upon receiving Smith's request for the "Right Here, Right Now" mix on 31 December 2014, McCarthy canceled his New Year's Eve plans and got to work. McCarthy tackled issues in "Right Here, Right Now" where drum loops and kick drums weren't aligning correctly, employing aggressive equalization and precise adjustments to make them fit sonically. He used tools like the Metric Halo channel strip and the UAD 1073. Mixing Minogue's vocals was challenging as they arrived pre-processed with effects. The engineer adapted by mixing the production first, then subtly EQing the vocals and using a Sonnox Inflater with extensive automation. Australian mastering engineer Matt Gray automated the lead-up to the chorus of "Right Here, Right Now" and applied different midrange EQ to the vocals to smooth them out. Smith was proud of the production, saying "The sonics were all over the map and [the engineers] really helped bring it back to centre".

== Composition and release ==
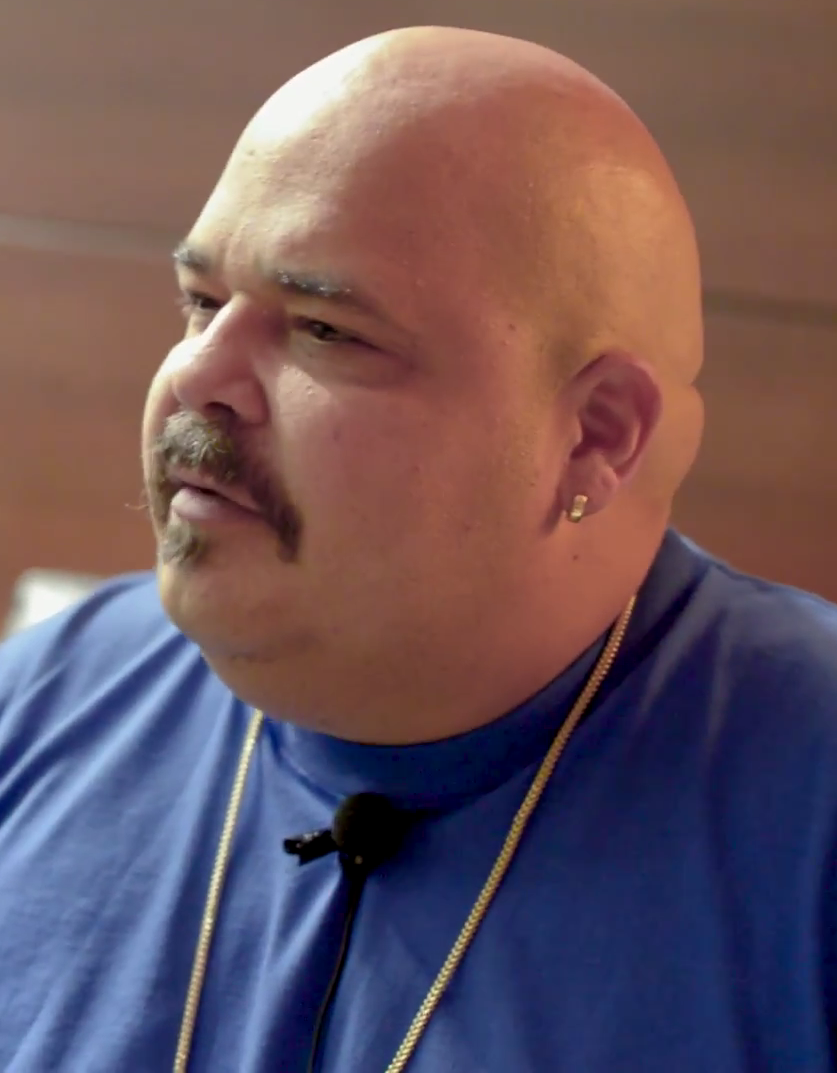
The DJ Sneak (pictured in 2018) remix was included on the digital remix EP and sent to the Italian radio station in February 2015.

"Right Here, Right Now" is set in the key of D major with a tempo of 115 beats per minute. Music critics categorize the overall sound as dance-pop, electropop, club, and disco. The track contains four-on-the-floor rhythm, handclaps, rubbery beat, cascading synths, funky guitar, and gritty basslines. Its pulsating verse cascades into a soaring chorus, one that Jason Lamphier of Out described as "a cloud-parting siren's call of a chorus". Minogue delivers light and seductive vocals, consistently hitting high notes on the chorus. Meanwhile, Moroder's hiccup-like background vocals, heavily processed with a Vocoder, add to the overall sonic texture.

Critics pointed out the track's nostalgic dance production, comparing it with those of Daft Punk, Moroder and Philip Oakey's "Together in Electric Dreams" (1984), Minogue's "Spinning Around" (2000), and Bruno Mars's "Uptown Funk" (2014). Nolan Feeney of Time, on the other hand, felt the production's modern feel would have allowed it to integrate seamlessly into Minogue's previous album, Kiss Me Once (2014). The song explores themes of romantic connection and living in the moment, a common topic in club tracks. DirectLyrics proposed that the song centers on embracing love, while Alistair Powell of Classic Pop argued that the song depicts "a tale of the deeper healing power of love".

The song leaked online on 16 January 2015, shortly before its official digital release on 20 January. Serving as the second single from the album Déjà Vu, it followed "74 is the New 24," which had been released in November 2014. The track was serviced to Italian radio stations on 19 January. A digital remix EP arrived on 27 February, featuring remixes by record producers DJ Sneak, Felix da Housecat, Ant LaRock, and Kenny Summit. DJ Sneak's version specifically received an Italian radio push on 20 February. This was followed in March by the "More Remixes EP", which included further reworkings by Seventh Heaven, Whiiite, Zoo Brazil, and Ralphi Rosario. Years later, on 29 August 2020, the Kenny Summit Club mix was given a special release as a grey 12" vinyl single for UK Record Store Day by Good For You Records, with a yellow vinyl repress appearing on 2 December. The track was covered in October 2020, when Japanese singer Yū Hayami recorded it for the compilation album Slenderie Ideal.

== Critical reception ==
Moroder's contemporary production on "Right Here, Right Now" garnered praise from several critics, with Feeney noting the producer's adeptness at evolving his sound over decades. Alex Hudson of Exclaim! described the track as a "pleasantly danceable treat", Eric Henderson of Slant Magazine called it a "gorgeous midtempo workout", Brian Lloyd of entertainment.ie predicted it would be a summer hit, while DirectLyrics lauded the loving theme and compared its quality to the songs on Minogue's Fever (2001). Critics also commended the smooth collaboration between Moroder and Minogue. DIY and Jamie Parmenter of Renowned for Sound praised their ability to tread new creative ground. For Elliot Mitchell of Gigwise, the song represented a fresh take on Moroder's signature disco sound and showcased a synergy that played to the individual strengths of both him and Minogue. Reviewers found Minogue to be a natural and fitting presence on the track. Digital Spy, entertainment.ie and DirectLyrics praised her ethereal vocals, whereas Exclaim! and The Scotsman described it as shrill. Andy Beta of Pitchfork believed the singer, though underwhelmed by the production, still succeeded in making the song her own. Classic Pop picked the track among Minogue's best collaborations, referred to it as "a classy piece of pulsating electro-disco".

In reviews of Déjà Vu, numerous critics picked "Right Here, Right Now" as a highlight from the star-studded album. Aidin Vaziri of San Francisco Chronicle and Michael Smith of Renowned for Sound picked the track as a demonstration of Giorgio's versatility on the album. Others, including The Guardian's Kitty Empire, and Vice's Angus Harrison dismissed the production as unoriginal. In his review, Robert Bates of Crack Magazine found it to be the sole enjoyable track on the album, yet was disappointed by its production and bland lyrics. Under the Radar's Austin Trunick deemed the track inferior to Minogue's singles standard, while Resident Advisor's Andrew Ryce likened its sound to a leftover from her 2010 studio album, Aphrodite.

== Commercial performance ==
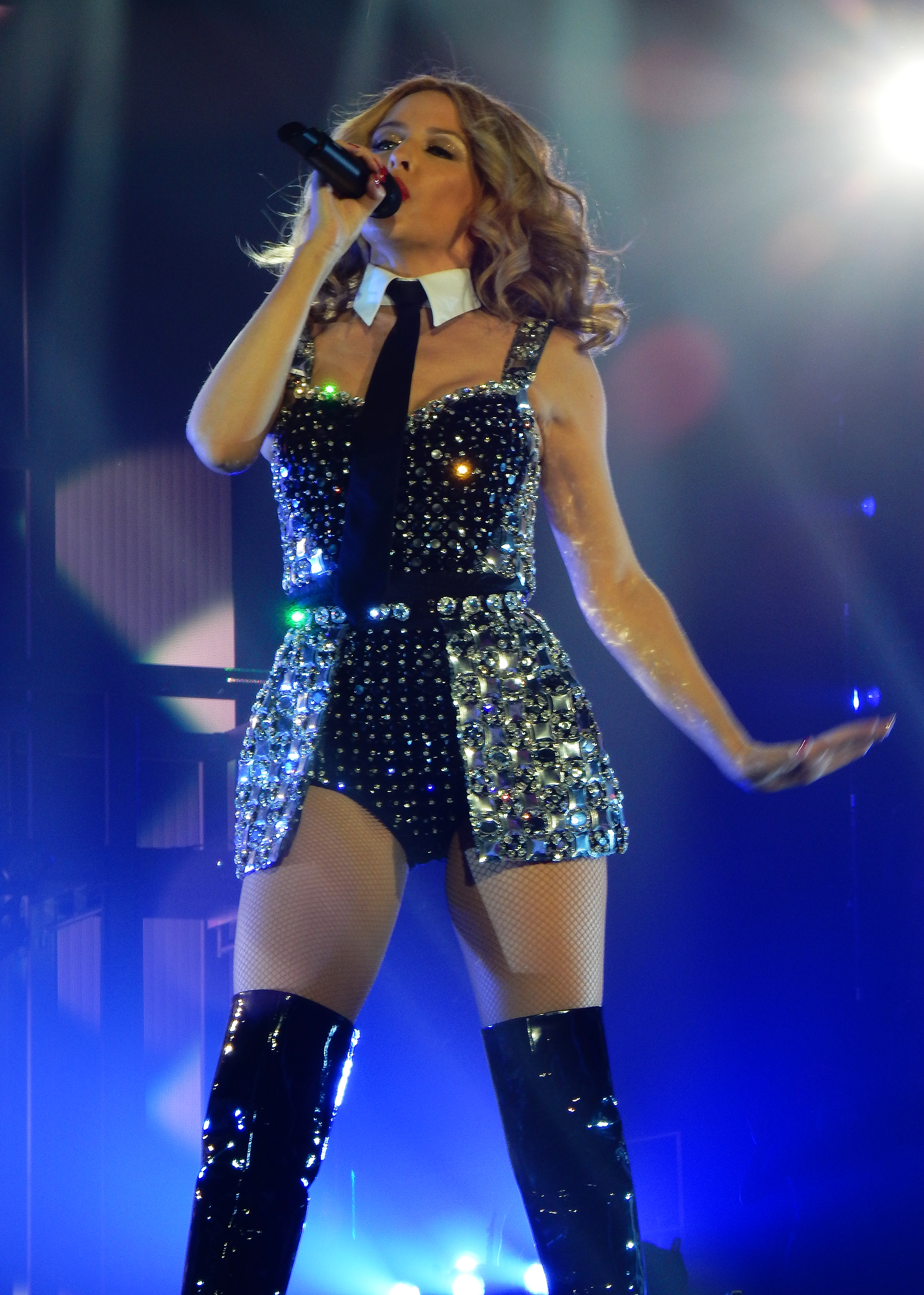
"Right Here, Right Now" became Minogue's (pictured in 2014) twelfth number-one single on the US Hot Dance Club Songs.

In the United Kingdom, "Right Here, Right Now" failed to enter the UK Singles Chart, peaking instead at number 74 on both the Singles Sales and Singles Downloads charts on February 1, 2015. On the Scottish Singles Chart, the track peaked at number 75. Following the vinyl release in August 2020, it reached number 56 on the UK Physical Singles chart. In Argentina, the track topped the airplay chart compiled by Los 40 on 21 March. Elsewhere in Europe, "Right Here, Right Now" spent a sole week on the national singles charts in France (147), Spain (40), and the digital single chart in Finland (17). In Belgium, the song peaked on the Flanders (10) and Wallonia (28) Ultratip charts, which rank songs that have not yet entered the top 50.

In the United States, "Right Here, Right Now" reached the top of Billboard Hot Dance Club Songs on the 18 April 2015 issue. The single marked Moroder's second and Minogue's twelfth number-one entry on the chart. For Moroder, it was his first number-one hit since March 2000, when the Jam & Spoon mix of his 1978 instrumental, "The Chase", topped the chart. Billboard reported that remixes, particularly those by 7th Heaven, Ralphi Rosario, and Zoo Brazil, propelled the track to the number-one spot. The track was Moroder's first entry on the Hot Dance/Electronic Songs, reaching number 26 on 18 April.

== Promotion ==
Directed by Daniel Börjesson, the music video for "Right Here, Right Now" was filmed in Los Angeles. Shootings for the video took place in December 2014, and Canadian dancer Blake McGrath served as choreographer. Moroder and Minogue were on set together for the video shoot. Moroder was particularly impressed by Minogue's work ethic, as she did not want to depart the set before all filming was concluded.

The music video was uploaded to Moroder's YouTube account on 2 January 2015. It features overlaid triangles, technicolour, typography, lighting effects, and quick camera changes. While Moroder assumes the role of DJ in the background, Minogue lies on the floor and leads with choreography that engages in a call-and-response dynamic with a relentlessly replicating kaleidoscopic lens. The duo repeatedly splits and multiplies, creating numerous intersecting images. DIY found the visual effects complemented the track's futuristic sound, while Spin's Brennan Carley praised Moroder's appearance and Minogue's on-point choreography. Marc Andrews, writing in Kylie: Song by Song, commended the video as a "flawless, inventive piece of music video art". DirectLyrics complemented the simplistic video, drawing a parallel between Minogue's choreography on the floor and that seen in her "Slow" (2003) music video.

Moroder and Minogue played "Right Here, Right Now" live for the first time on 14 March 2015, as part of Minogue's Kiss Me Once Tour, at the Perth Arena. In February, it was announced that the producer would join five shows during the tour's Australian leg. He opened the show by performing a DJ set featuring selections from his discography, before appearing as a special guest on stage and playing "Right Here, Right Now". Moroder then led Minogue to perform a cover of Donna Summer's "I Feel Love" (1977), which he co-wrote and produced. "I literally have to pinch myself that we have with us here tonight the godfather of disco himself", Minogue said on stage. Impressed by her high-note delivery, Choon Tan of Student Edge joined Candice Barnes of The Sydney Morning Herald in praising the set's enjoyable vocals, while media journalist Paul Cashmere hailed it as a "once in a lifetime" moment. Moroder subsequently included the track in his live sets in Australia (March 2015), and First Avenue, Minnesota (September 2018).

== Personnel ==
Personnel are adapted from Déjà Vu liner notes and Apple Music.

- Giorgio Moroder – producer, composer, performer, arranger
- Kylie Minogue – performer
- David Etherington – composer, lyricist, arranger
- Karen Poole – composer, lyricist, vocal producer, arranger
- Patrick Jordan-Patrikios – composer, co-producer, arranger
- Bruce Eskowitz – executive producer
- Seb Webber – executive producer
- Michael Smidi Smith – executive producer
- Mitch McCarthy – mixing engineer

== Charts ==
2015 weekly chart performance for "Right Here, Right Now"
Chart (2015)	Peak position
Argentina (Los 40 Principales)	1
Belgium (Ultratip Bubbling Under Flanders)	10
Belgium Dance (Ultratop Flanders)	21
Belgium (Ultratip Bubbling Under Wallonia)	28
Finland Download (Latauslista)	17
France (SNEP)	147
Scottish Singles Sales (Official Charts)	75
Spain (Promusicae)	40
UK Singles Downloads (Official Charts)	74
US Dance Club Songs (Billboard)	1
US Hot Dance/Electronic Songs (Billboard)	26

== Release history ==
Release dates for "Right Here, Right Now"
Region	Date	Format	Label	Version
Italy	19 January 2015	Contemporary hit radio	Sony Music	Single
Various	20 January 2015	Digital download	Giorgio Moroder Music; RCA	Single
Italy	20 February 2015	Contemporary hit radio	Sony Music	DJ Sneak remix
Various	27 February 2015	Digital download	Giorgio Moroder Music; Sony	Remix EP
Various	27 March 2015	Digital download	Giorgio Moroder Music; Sony	More Remixes EP
United Kingdom	29 August 2020	12" single	Good For You	Kenny Summit Club Mix
Europe	2 December 2020	12" single	Good For You	Kenny Summit Club Mix

== See also ==
- List of number-one dance singles of 2015 (U.S.)
