= Déjà Vu (Giorgio Moroder song) =

Single by Giorgio Moroder featuring Sia

from the album Déjà Vu
- Released: 17 April 2015
- Recorded: 2014
- Genre: Disco; pop
- Length: 3:20
- Label: RCA
- Songwriters: Sia Furler; Giorgio Moroder
- Producers: Giorgio Moroder; Michael "Smidi" Smith

Giorgio Moroder singles chronology
"Right Here, Right Now" (2015)	"Déjà Vu" (2015)	"Tom's Diner" (2015)

Sia singles chronology
"Elastic Heart" (2015)	"Déjà Vu" (2015)	"Golden" (2015)

Music video
- "Déjà Vu (feat. Sia)" on YouTube

"Déjà Vu" is a song by Italian disc jockey producer Giorgio Moroder, featuring vocals from Australian singer Sia. The song is the third single on Moroder's 2015 album, Déjà Vu. It was released on 17 April 2015, as a digital download via iTunes.

== Composition ==
"Déjà Vu" is a disco-rooted song with a "funky" '70s pop vibe, supported by disco-infused guitars and a four on the floor beat.

== Music video ==
Directed by Alexandra Dahlström, the music video follows a young man (played by Drew Lipson) who visits a hotel and repeatedly encounters multiple Sia lookalikes, that are either loving and kind or manipulative and nasty to the man, who, unfortunately, can not tell the difference between the look-alikes. A teaser for the video was released on 30 April, with the official video premiering on 5 May 2015.

== Track listing ==
Digital download – single

1. "Déjà Vu" – 3:20

Digital download – remixes

1. "Déjà Vu" (Thin White Duke Remix) – 5:23
2. "Déjà Vu" (Benny Benassi Club Remix) – 4:50
3. "Déjà Vu" (Felix Jaehn Club Remix) – 5:37
4. "Déjà Vu" (Salute Remix) – 3:42

== Chart performance ==
In the UK the song charted on the UK Singles chart however it failed to enter the top 100 but instead entered the top 200 peaking at 194. The song also charted in France peaking at 182. In Scotland the song charted on the Scotland OCC peaking at 93. The song had more success in Japan peaking at 35 on the Japan Hot 100 and charted for 3 weeks. The song peaked at number 1 on the US Dance Club Songs chart becoming his 3rd chart topper on that chart, and it also charted on the US Hot Dance/Electronic Songs chart peaking at number 25.

== Charts ==
=== Weekly charts ===
Chart (2015)	Peak position
France (SNEP)	182
Japan Hot 100 (Billboard)	35
Scottish Singles Sales (Official Charts)	93
UK Singles (Official Charts Company)	194
US Hot Dance/Electronic Songs (Billboard)	25
US Dance Club Songs (Billboard)	1

=== Year-end charts ===
Chart (2015)	Position
US Dance Club Songs (Billboard)	23
US Hot Dance/Electronic Songs (Billboard)	89

== Release history ==
Country	Date	Format	Label
Worldwide	17 April 2015	Digital download	Giorgio Moroder Music LLC; RCA
Italy	15 May 2015	Contemporary hit radio	Giorgio Moroder Music LLC; RCA
United States	19 May 2015	Dance radio	RCA
Worldwide	19 June 2015	Digital download (Remix EP)	Giorgio Moroder Music LLC; RCA

== Tracks in other languages ==
Language	Interpret	Date	Format
Russian	Grey Wiese (APPolonovGang)	24.11.2018	Digital download

== See also ==
- List of number-one dance singles of 2015 (U.S.)
