= Grey Wiese =

Russian-German singer

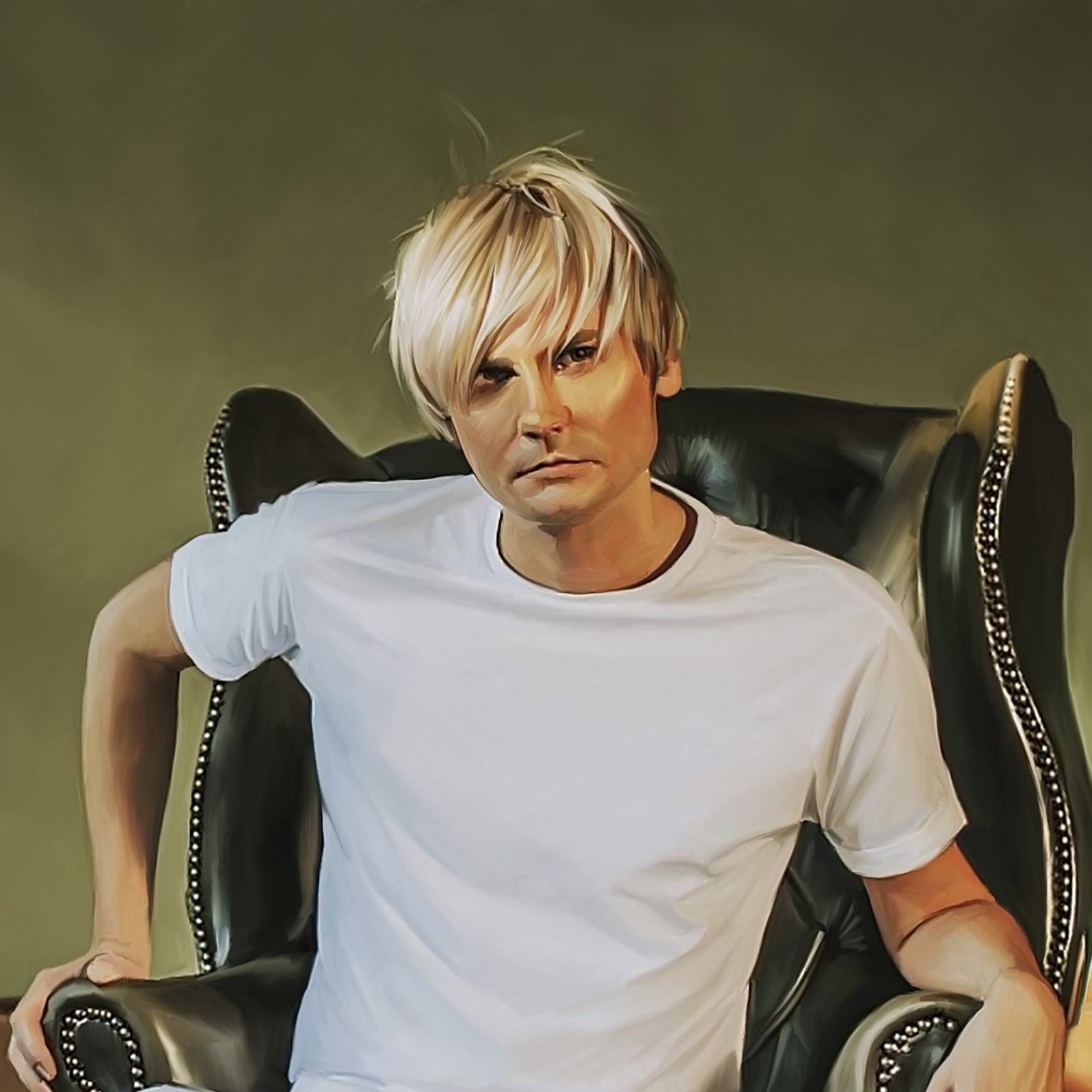

Background information
- Born: Sergey Grigorev-Appolonov; Saratov, Russian SFSR, Soviet Union
- Genres: pop
- Occupations: Singer; songwriter
- Labels: Grey Wiese Music, APPolonovGang Production
- Website: greywiese.com

Sergey Grigorev-Appolonov (Russian: Сергей Григорьев-Апполонов), known professionally as Grey Wiese, is a Russian-born German singer-songwriter, media personality and he has been described as the most popular Russian-speaking influencer in Europe. He is a relative of Andrei Grigorev-Appolonov (member of the pop group Ivanushki International).

== Early life ==
Sergey studied piano and attended a folk dance school as a child. He later graduated from the Russian Presidential Academy of National Economy and Public Administration. In the early 2000s, he relocated to Germany, where he studied management and economics and had a career in exports before turning to music through encouragement from his friends.

== Relocation and career in the pharmaceutical industry ==
After finishing his studies in Germany, Sergey worked for more than a decade in the pharmaceutical industry, holding various senior corporate positions. In interviews, he later described this period as professionally successful but internally limiting. Despite a successful and well-established corporate career, he made a conscious decision to leave the pharmaceutical industry and pursue a creative path under the name @greywiese

== Music career ==
Grey Wiese began his music career by recording covers of international artists such as Sia, Sam Smith, Rihanna and others uploaded to YouTube. His career snowballed with covers. His first original track was "Who Are You" in 2017. In 2017 and 2018, Grey released five singles and an album titled #Beyourself.

In 2018, he released the single "You and Me" with Andrei Grigorev-Appolonov Jr. A month later, they released a video, starring Aleksandra Kutsevol, Oleg Yakovlev's civil wife. The video scored more than a million views on YouTube. The song hit the Russian iTunes chart for several weeks, rising to 4th place.

In September 2018, with Andrei Grigorev-Appolonov Jr., Sergey organized a musical band #AppolonovGang. In November 2018 they released "Deja Vu" in Russian written by Giorgio Moroder and Sia.

On 17 October 2025, Grey Wiese released a licensed digital recording of his interpretation of "Je reviens te chercher", originally written and performed by Gilbert Bécaud. The release followed the issuance of a license by Universal Music France and became available on international streaming platforms, including Apple Music.

== Discography ==
- 2017
  - Who are you
  - Sick with a dream
  - I set you free
  - We are in love
  - With heart on hold
- 2018
  - #beyourself
  - You and me (Я и Ты) feat. Andrey Grigorev-Appolonov Jr.
  - Begging hurts feat. Andrey Grigorev-Appolonov Jr.
  - Likes and Brands (Лайки Бренды) feat. Andrey Grigorev-Appolonov Jr.(#AppolonovGang)
  - Before and after(После и До) feat. Andrey Grigorev-Appolonov Jr.
  - Deja Vu written by Giorgio Moroder and Sia (#AppolonovGang)
  - Pain (Боль) (#AppolonovGang)
- 2019
  - Happy (Щастливые) (#AppolonovGang)
- 2020
  - Smotri (#APPolonovGang) Album
- 2025
  - Je reviens te chercher

== Public activity and social media ==
Since 2020, Grey Wiese has actively developed his presence on social media. His content focuses on music, personal identity, travel, and everyday life in Europe. His Instagram account currently counts 2 million followers.

In 2025, according to various media outlets, Sergey has been described as the most popular Russian-speaking influencer in Europe.

His audience primarily consists of Russian-speaking people in the European Union and worldwide. On his YouTube channel, he publishes long-form lifestyle vlogs, travel content, interviews, and discussions on contemporary social topics.

=== Casino de Paris performance ===
On 21 May 2026, Grey Wiese presented Grey Wiese Le Show at the Casino de Paris in Paris, France. The performance was held before a sold-out audience and featured a theatrical concert format combining live music, visual storytelling, fashion elements and guest appearances.

The event was attended by audiences from France and other European countries and became one of Grey Wiese's largest live productions in Europe.

== Media appearances and public discourse ==
Grey Wiese has appeared in numerous interviews and media discussions addressing identity, migration and life in Europe.

- In September 2025, he participated in an interview with journalist Ksenia Sobchak.

The interview was later removed following a request by Roskomnadzor, the Russian federal media regulator, which cited alleged signs of LGBTQ+ propaganda as the reason for the removal.

— In a subsequent TV Rain segment addressing the removal, Sergey said: "I even expected things to turn out worse. Everything was quite obvious to me."
He added: "I was honestly surprised that the interview was released at all."
He also said: "The term 'LGBT propaganda' sounds absurd to me. Propaganda cannot influence something that is innate.",

— Grey Wiese addressed the situation during an appearance on Khodorkovsky LIVE: “Ksenia called me in the morning and apologized profusely. She said, ‘You understand the reality I live in, in this country.’”
He added: “She had to do it; otherwise, the entire channel could have been declared banned.”
He also said: “The reaction was very positive — there was a lot of support for me and for my mother.”,

- In November 2025, he appeared in an interview with Deutsche Welle, discussing European society and migration.
- In December 2025, he appeared on the independent Russian-language television channel TV Rain (Dozhd), where he discussed personal experiences and public life in Europe and performed his hit “Je reviens te chercher” live for the first time

Some of these appearances generated public debate within Russian-speaking online communities.

- In February 2026, Sergey gave an interview to Marie Claire, in which he discussed personal values, public perception, and his approach to human relationships.

== Views and personal statements ==
In interviews, Grey Wiese has spoken openly about identity, migration, and LGBTQ issues.

- On identity and belonging, he stated:
  “Wherever I live, it doesn’t really matter. What matters is an inner state. Right now, I feel happy.”
  “If you move to a new place and genuinely want to live there, you can already call it home the very next day.”
- On personal honesty, he noted:
  “The most important coming out is the one you do to yourself. Everything else comes later.”
- Discussing public responsibility and society, he said:
  “I cannot stop the war, but if I can make people less homophobic, that already matters.”
  “I try to think positively about all people and to trust them initially. Even if someone deceives me later, it is better to be disappointed in 10% of people than to distrust everyone in advance.”
- On popularity and audience, he stated:
  “I don’t feel popular. These are just numbers, and you don’t always realize that real people stand behind them.”
  “Even if there were only ten thousand viewers left, I would still continue for them.”
  “Popularity is not only attention and compliments. It is also endless comments about how you look. Not everyone is ready for that.”
  “When I first started this whole blogging and music journey, my main dream was for my songs to become popular. To walk past somewhere, hear music coming from someone’s window or a café — and suddenly realize that it’s your song.”
- On success and personal freedom:
  “Success for me is the ability to earn money doing what I truly enjoy, without bosses and without alarm clocks.”

== Awards and recognition ==
In 2025, Sergey Grigoriev-Appolonov was named Person of the Year by Doberman Media for his contribution to Russian-speaking culture abroad.
