= Déjà Vu (Giorgio Moroder album) =

Studio album by Giorgio Moroder
- Released: 12 June 2015
- Genre: Disco; pop; EDM
- Length: 42:08
- Label: RCA
- Producer: Giorgio Moroder; Roman Lüth; Raney Shockne; Sikow; Patrick Jordan-Patrikios; Jeeve; Michael Smidi Smith; Joakim Åhlund; Emily Wright

Giorgio Moroder chronology
Forever Dancing (1992)	Déjà Vu (2015)

Singles from Déjà Vu
- 1. "74 Is the New 24" Released: 17 November 2014; 2. "Right Here, Right Now" Released: 20 January 2015; 3. "Déjà Vu" Released: 17 April 2015; 4. "Tom's Diner" Released: 9 October 2015

Déjà Vu (stylized as deja-vu) is the fourteenth studio album by Italian DJ Giorgio Moroder. It is his first album after a 23-year hiatus following Forever Dancing (1992). It was released on 12 June 2015, and features collaborations with Kylie Minogue, Sia, Britney Spears, Kelis, Charli XCX, Mikky Ekko, Foxes and Matthew Koma, among others. On 20 January 2015, the collaboration with Kylie Minogue, "Right Here, Right Now", was officially released, along with a video teaser.

== Background ==
Moroder contributed to Daft Punk's 2013 studio album Random Access Memories, admitting that he had been a fan of their song "One More Time" before working with the group. His voice and story is featured on the album's track "Giorgio by Moroder". On the track he states, "My name is Giovanni Giorgio, but everybody calls me Giorgio."

In summer 2013, Giorgio started to DJ, making his US debut at the Red Bull Music Academy in New York City. He toured around the world, playing his classics from the '70s and '80s as well as new remixes.

In 2014, Giorgio Moroder reworked a song of his own from the '60s called "Doo Bee Doo" (2014 version), which was used in the 2014 Volkswagen Super Bowl commercial titled "Wings".

In March 2014, singer Kelis announced a collaboration with Moroder on her Facebook page. The following month, Moroder released his official remix of Coldplay's "Midnight" from their album Ghost Stories. He also announced that he will work with the French electro-pop producer Madeon, and American singer Lana Del Rey.

On 9 June 2014, Adult Swim released a Hi-NRG disco single by Moroder called "Giorgio's Theme". Moroder also remixed Tony Bennett and Lady Gaga's rendition of "I Can't Give You Anything but Love".

In November 2014, it was announced that Déjà Vu featuring contributions from Britney Spears, Kylie Minogue, Sia, Charli XCX, Mikky Ekko, Foxes, Matthew Koma, among others was being put together.

== Critical reception ==
Professional ratings
Aggregate scores
Source	Rating
AnyDecentMusic?	4.8/10
Metacritic	54/100
Review scores
Source	Rating
AllMusic	3/5 stars
The A.V. Club	B−
Billboard	3.5/5 stars
The Guardian	2/5 stars
The Independent	2/5 stars
The Observer	2/5 stars
Pitchfork	2.5/10
Slant Magazine	2.5/5 stars
Spin	6/10
The Telegraph	2/5 stars

Déjà Vu received mixed reviews from music critics. At Metacritic, which assigns a normalized rating out of 100 to reviews from mainstream critics, the album received an average score of 54 based on 25 reviews, which indicates "mixed or average reviews".

== Singles ==
"74 Is the New 24" was the album's lead single, and was released on 11 November 2014.

"Right Here, Right Now" featuring Kylie Minogue was released worldwide as the second single on 20 January with a music video on Moroder's Vevo channel. The single was a success, managing to top the Billboard Hot Dance Club Songs chart and the Argentinian Singles Chart. The song was also performed with Moroder on Minogue's Kiss Me Once Tour in Australia.

"Déjà Vu" featuring Sia served as the third single. It was released worldwide on 17 April 2015 and was accompanied by a music video, also uploaded on Moroder's Vevo. Despite limited success in Europe, the single was popular in the US, reaching number one on the Billboard Dance chart. The tracks "Diamonds" (featuring Charli XCX) and "Don't Let Go" (featuring Mikky Ekko) were made available in the pre-order of the album, on May 13, 2015, a few days after the leak of both.

"Tom's Diner" featuring Britney Spears was released as the fourth and final single on 9 October 2015.

== Track listing ==
Déjà Vu – Standard version
No.	Title	Writer(s)	Producer(s)	Length
1.	"4 U with Love"	Giorgio Moroder	Moroder	2:36
2.	"Déjà Vu" (featuring Sia)	Moroder; Sia Furler	Moroder; Michael "Smidi" Smith^{[a]}	3:20
3.	"Diamonds" (featuring Charli XCX)	Charlotte Emma Aitchison; Joakim Åhlund	Moroder; Åhlund^{[a]}	3:31
4.	"Don't Let Go" (featuring Mikky Ekko)	Ekko; Fraser T Smith	Moroder; Patrick Jordan-Patrikios	4:29
5.	"Right Here, Right Now" (featuring Kylie Minogue)	Moroder; Jordan-Patrikios; Karen Poole; David Etherington	Moroder; Roman Lüth; Jordan-Patrikios	3:30
6.	"Tempted" (featuring Matthew Koma)	Moroder; Koma; Raney Shockne; Jordan-Patrikios; Scribz Riley; Jean-Yves "Jeeve" Ducornet; Dan Book	Moroder; Shockne; Jeeve	3:21
7.	"74 Is the New 24"	Moroder	Moroder; Lüth^{[a]}	4:02
8.	"Tom's Diner" (featuring Britney Spears)	Suzanne Vega	Shockne; Jeeve; Jordan-Patrikios; Emily Wright^{[b]}	3:32
9.	"Wildstar" (featuring Foxes)	Moroder; Louisa Rose Allen; Joel Pott; Raney Shockne; Ducornet; Jordan-Patrikios	Shockne; Jeeve	3:47
10.	"Back and Forth" (featuring Kelis)	Moroder; Kelis Rogers	Moroder	3:04
11.	"I Do This for You" (featuring Marlene)	Moroder; Marlene Strand; Elof Loelv; Oskar Sikow; Victor Holmberg	Moroder; Sikow	3:23
12.	"La Disco"	Moroder	Moroder	3:33
Total length:				42:08

Déjà Vu – Japanese edition
No.	Title	Writer(s)	Producer(s)	Length
13.	"Magnificent"	Moroder; Jordan-Patrikios		3:32
14.	"City Lights"	Moroder; Syndicate Music		3:17
15.	"Timeless" (featuring Markus Schulz)	Moroder; Schulz		4:20
16.	"74 Is the New 24" (Lifelike & Kris Menace Remix)	Moroder	Moroder; Lüth; Lifelike & Kris Menace	5:37
17.	"Right Here, Right Now" (Ralphi Rosario Club Mix)	Moroder; Jordan-Patrikios; Poole; Etherington	Moroder; Lüth; Jordan-Patrikios; Ralphi Rosario	7:52
18.	"Right Here, Right Now" (Kenny Summit Dub Mix)	Moroder; Jordan-Patrikios; Poole; Etherington	Moroder; Lüth; Jordan-Patrikios; Kenny Summit	6:32
Total length:				1:13:40

Déjà Vu – Deluxe edition (bonus disc)
No.	Title	Writer(s)	Producer(s)	Length
1.	"Magnificent"	Moroder; Jordan-Patrikios		3:32
2.	"City Lights"	Moroder; Syndicate Music		3:17
3.	"Timeless" (featuring Markus Schulz)	Moroder; Schulz		4:20
4.	"74 Is the New 24" (Lifelike & Kris Menace Remix)	Moroder	Moroder; Lüth; Lifelike & Kris Menace	5:37
Total length:				17:08

Notes

- ^{^[a]} signifies a co-producer
- ^{^[b]} signifies a vocal producer

== Personnel ==
=== Performers ===
- Giorgio Moroder – vocals, programming, keyboards
- Sia – vocals
- Charli XCX – vocals
- Mikky Ekko – vocals
- Kylie Minogue – vocals
- Matthew Koma – vocals
- Britney Spears – vocals
- Foxes – vocals
- Kelis – vocals
- Marlene – vocals

=== Technical ===
- Production – Giorgio Moroder
- Executive production – Michael "Smidi" Smith
- Mixing – Mitch McCarthy
- Mixing – Manny Marroquin (track 2)
- Mastering – Matthew Gray (Matthew Gray Mastering, Australia)

== Charts ==
Chart (2015)	Peak position
Australian Albums (ARIA)	23
Austrian Albums (Ö3 Austria)	72
Belgian Albums (Ultratop Flanders)	52
Belgian Albums (Ultratop Wallonia)	83
Dutch Albums (Album Top 100)	50
French Albums (SNEP)	127
German Albums (Offizielle Top 100)	31
Irish Albums (IRMA)	38
Italian Albums (FIMI)	18
Japanese Albums (Oricon)	53
South Korean Albums (Circle)	71
Scottish Albums (OCC)	35
Spanish Albums (Promusicae)	96
Swiss Albums (Schweizer Hitparade)	22
UK Albums (OCC)	30
US Billboard 200	72
US Top Dance Albums (Billboard)	1

== Release history ==
Country	Date	Format	Label	Ref
Australia	12 June 2015	CD; digital download	Giorgio Moroder Music; Sony Music	
Germany	12 June 2015	CD; LP; digital download	Giorgio Moroder Music; Sony Music	
France	15 June 2015	CD; vinyl; digital download	Giorgio Moroder Music; Sony Music	
Japan	15 June 2015	CD; LP; digital download	Giorgio Moroder Music; Sony Music Japan	
United Kingdom	15 June 2015	CD; vinyl; digital download	Giorgio Moroder Music; RCA	
United States	16 June 2015	CD; digital download	Giorgio Moroder Music; RCA	
Brazil	16 June 2015	Digital download	Giorgio Moroder Music; Sony Music	
Italy	16 June 2015	CD; vinyl; digital download	Giorgio Moroder Music; Sony Music	
Brazil	7 July 2015	CD	Giorgio Moroder Music; Sony Music	
