= Patrick Jordan-Patrikios =

- Also known as: Patrick Patrikios
- Born: 26 April 1987 (age 39)
- Origin: Newport, Wales
- Genres: Pop; dance; urban
- Occupations: Record producer; songwriter; musician
- Instruments: Drums; keyboards; guitars; computer
- Years active: 2005–present

Patrick Jordan-Patrikios (born 26 April 1987) is a Welsh record producer, songwriter and multi-instrumentalist musician.

== Biography ==
Patrick Jordan-Patrikios was born and raised in Pontypool, Wales to a Welsh mother and a Greek father. He moved to London, where he currently lives, when he was 17 and started working as session musician for artists like Coolio, Terri Walker, Big Brovas and others. Patrick's writing skills brought him to the attention of John Saunderson, an A&R at Notting Hill Music, who signed him to the company in May 2010.

He has written and produced for Little Mix, Giorgio Moroder, Britney Spears, Foxes, Matthew Koma and others.

== Music ==
Patrick-Jordan-Patrikios has written and produced songs for Little Mix (Syco), HRVY (Virgin EMI), Pixie Lott (Mercury), JLS (Epic), Olly Murs (Epic), Roll Deep (Cooking Vinyl), Il Divo (Syco), Giorgio Moroder (RCA), Susan Boyle (Sony), Lights (Warner)

He is currently working with Jesy Nelson, who recently left the British girl group Little Mix.

== Discography ==
- "Joan of Arc" & "Motivate" (November 2018) from Little Mix's album LM5.
- "Touch" (November 2016) from Little Mix's album Glory Days.
- "Never Gonna Stop" (November 2011) from JLS's album Jukebox
- "Tell The World" (November 2011) from Olly Murs's album In Case You Didn't Know
- "Senza Parole" (November 2011) from Il Divo's album Wicked Game
- "We Just Go On" (November 2011) from Pixie Lott's album Young Foolish Happy
- "Enjoy the Silence" (November 2011) from Susan Boyle's album Someone to Watch Over Me.
- "Female Boss" (December 2012) from Tulisa's album The Female Boss.
- "Right Here, Right Now" (January 2015) from Giorgio Moroder's album Déjà Vu.
- "Tom's Diner" (January 2015) from Giorgio Moroder's album Déjà Vu.
- "Giving Me Soul" (January 2015) from The Overtones 's album Sweet Soul Music.
- 'I Wish You Were Here' (2020) HRVY
- 'Problems' (2020) from Arizona album Asylum
- 'Liar' (2020) Noah Cyrrus
- 'lost' (2020) Cher Lloyd
- 'BauBeatz' (October 2020) Baulander
