= A Lifetime to Repair =

2018 single by Kylie Minogue

Single by Kylie Minogue

from the album Golden
- Released: 17 August 2018
- Recorded: 2017
- Studio: Phrased Differently (London, England)
- Genre: Dance-pop; country pop
- Length: 3:18
- Label: Darenote; BMG
- Songwriter(s): Kylie Minogue; Sky Adams; Danny Shah; Kiris Houston
- Producer(s): Sky Adams

Kylie Minogue singles chronology
"Golden" (2018)	"A Lifetime to Repair" (2018)	"Music's Too Sad Without You" (2018)

Lyric video
- "A Lifetime to Repair" on YouTube

"A Lifetime to Repair" is a song by Australian recording artist Kylie Minogue from her fourteenth studio album Golden (2018). Written by Minogue, Sky Adams, Danny Shah and Kiris Houston, and produced by Adams, the song was released as the fourth single from the album and was sent to radios on 4 August 2018, and it appeared on digital platforms on 17 August. Like previous singles from Golden, "A Lifetime to Repair" uses elements of country pop combined with elements of dance-pop, backed by acoustic guitars, pianos and a banjo. Lyrically, the song deals with Minogue's past heart breaks, and how she would learn from these for future potential relationships. The song was slightly reworked for single release with a stronger bass and more emphasis on the fiddle.

A lyric video for "A Lifetime to Repair" was released on the same day, with the concept of a scrapbook diary throughout the video. The song was performed during the Kylie Presents Golden underplay shows.

== Background and composition ==
In January 2018, Minogue released her single "Dancing", her first offering from her fourteenth studio album Golden, and two months later announced the release of "Stop Me from Falling". On 29 May 2018, Minogue released the title track as the third single from the album. On 4 August, a radio edit of "A Lifetime to Repair" premiered on BBC Radio 2. On 17 August, the song was released on digital platforms, with Minogue confirming the release of the radio edit as the fourth single from Golden, as well as the artwork for the single.

"A Lifetime to Repair" runs for three minutes and nineteen seconds, and features instrumentation of acoustic guitars, piano, a fiddle and a banjo. Musically, "A Lifetime to Repair" is a pop song with heavy influences from country music. Lyrically, the song is one of the first from Golden to deal with heart break and failed relationships. Sonically, Helen Clarke from MusicOMH said the song was "structurally weird; half of it is made up of lolling country guitars and drawling vocals, the other half the glittery pop she's best known for."

== Lyric video ==
A lyric video for "A Lifetime to Repair", made by Halo Jones, was released and uploaded to Minogue's official YouTube channel on 16 August 2018; the video revolved around the idea of a scrapbook, with imagery of bits of scrap paper and sellotape included throughout the video.

== Live performances ==
"A Lifetime to Repair" was included on the set list for the Kylie Presents: Golden shows; during these shows, the production of the song was updated, with the chorus appearing more upbeat with the inclusion of an acoustic guitar. The song also appeared in the Golden Tour, where Minogue was dressed in full white and sang atop a pool table. On 28 October 2018, she performed the song on The X Factor UK.

== Formats and track listings ==
- Digital download
1. "A Lifetime to Repair" (Edit) - 3:17

== Release history ==
Region	Date	Format	Label	Ref.
Various	17 August 2018	Digital download	Darenote; BMG	
United Kingdom	24 August 2018	Contemporary hit radio	BMG	
