= Sincerely Yours (Kylie Minogue song) =

2018 single by Kylie Minogue

Single by Kylie Minogue

from the album Golden
- Released: 9 November 2018 (Note: "Sincerely Yours" was not issued as a single internationally, and received a limited release in Australia and New Zealand.)
- Recorded: July 2017
- Studio: Rhythm House (Nashville, TN)
- Genre: Country pop
- Length: 3:28
- Label: BMG; Liberator
- Songwriters: Kylie Minogue; Jesse Frasure; Amy Wadge
- Producer: Jesse Frasure

Kylie Minogue singles chronology
"Music's Too Sad Without You" (2018)	"Sincerely Yours" (2018)	"New York City" (2019)

Audio video
- "Sincerely Yours" on YouTube

"Sincerely Yours" is a song by Australian singer-songwriter Kylie Minogue, taken from her fourteenth studio album Golden (2018). The song was an exclusive single for the Australian and New Zealand markets, where it served as the album's sixth and final single, and impacted radio on 9 November 2018. In other markets, the song "Music's Too Sad Without You" was issued as the album's final single. The song was released through Minogue's own imprint, Darenote Limited, and record label BMG Rights Management. "Sincerely Yours" was written by Minogue, Amy Wadge, and the track's producer Jesse Frasure.

== Background and production ==
"Sincerely Yours" serves as the fifth song in the track listing of Minogue's fourteenth studio album, Golden (2018). It runs for a duration of three minutes and 28 seconds. The song was written by Minogue, British singer-songwriter Amy Wadge, and American musician Jesse Frasure. The track was produced by Frasure, the only track from Golden to be produced by him. Minogue dedicated the song to fans, and referred to the track as a "love letter" on social media website Twitter. Lyrically, the track speaks about Minogue taking a break from music, with lyrics such as "I just need a little time to hide".

The song, a pop ballad, was recorded during a two-week stay in the city of Nashville, Tennessee in July 2017. It was one of three songs to be recorded in the city, alongside the album's lead single "Dancing", and title-track "Golden". In an interview with Billboard, Minogue described these three songs as making the "homestretch easier", referring to finding creative direction during the process of creating Golden. Additionally, Minogue stated that she knew these three songs were "keepers" after recording them.

== Release ==
In October 2018, it was announced that the song "Music's Too Sad Without You" would serve as the album's fifth and final single. The song, a duet with English singer Jack Savoretti, was supported by appearances on TV shows such as The X Factor, The Jonathan Ross Show and Michael McIntyre's Big Show. "Music's Too Sad Without You" remained the album's final single in the majority of markets, however in November 2018 it was announced that "Sincerely Yours" would impact contemporary hit radio in Australia and New Zealand. It was the only single from Golden not to be issued internationally, and similarly the only single not have an associated music video or lyric video. Commercially, the song did not appear on any national charts. According to the Official Charts Company in April 2019, "Sincerely Yours" is Minogue's sixth most popular song not to be released as a single in the United Kingdom.

== Critical reception ==
The song received mixed reviews upon the release of Golden. Tim Sendra of website AllMusic compares the track to the music of Canadian duo Tegan and Sara, due to the "flimsy" vocals. Sal Cinquemani of Slant Magazine comments that the song is representative of Minogue's anxiety about her career. Cinquemani additionally suggests that the track could be interpreted as addressing fan's wishes for Minogue to return to dance-pop styles of music. Ben Cardew of Pitchfork negatively refers to the track as being "lightweight", and commented that the track includes "flimsy strings and a vocal hook which suggests Kylie wanted to go full "Where Are Ü Now" dolphin flute but couldn’t quite find room in the budget".

== Live performances ==
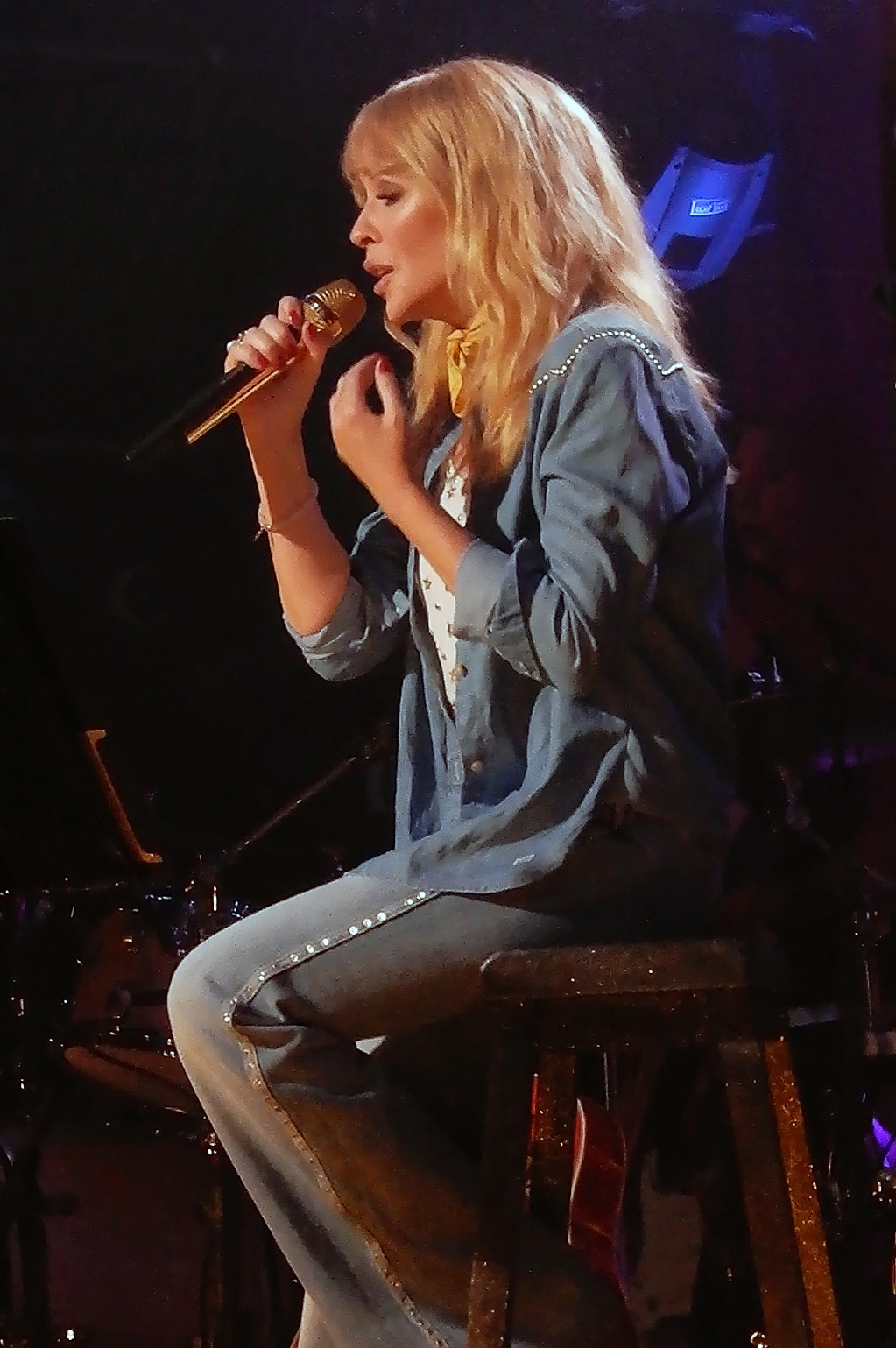
Minogue pictured in March 2018 at the Gorilla venue in Manchester, during her Kylie Presents Golden promotional tour, which featured "Sincerely Yours"

"Sincerely Yours" was included in the setlist for Minogue's promotional concert tour, Kylie Presents Golden. The tour, which visited only smaller venues, comprised five shows in Europe and one show in North America. The song was debuted live at the tour's first show, at the Café de Paris in London on 13 March 2018. However, the song was not included in Minogue's fifteenth concert tour, the Golden Tour, which served as the album's primary series of concerts.

== Credits and personnel ==
Credits adapted from Tidal and album liner notes of Golden.

- Kylie Minogue – lead vocals, backing vocals, composition
- Amy Wadge – backing vocals, composition
- Jesse Frasure – bass guitar, drums, piano, mixing, programming, recording, synthesiser, music production, composition
- Dick Beetham – mastering

== Release history ==
Region	Date	Format	Label	Ref.
Australia	9 November 2018	Contemporary hit radio	Liberator; BMG	
New Zealand	9 November 2018	Contemporary hit radio	Liberator; BMG	
