= New York City (Kylie Minogue song) =

2019 single by Kylie Minogue

Single by Kylie Minogue

from the album Step Back in Time: The Definitive Collection
- Released: 3 May 2019
- Recorded: 2019
- Genre: Funk-pop; disco-pop; pop rap
- Length: 3:20
- Label: BMG; Parlophone
- Songwriters: Kylie Minogue; Daniel Stein; Karen Poole; Myles MacInnes
- Producer: DJ Fresh

Kylie Minogue singles chronology
"Sincerely Yours" (2018)	"New York City" (2019)	"Really Don't Like U" (2019)

Music video
- "New York City" on YouTube

"New York City" is a song recorded by Australian singer Kylie Minogue. It was released for digital download and contemporary hit radio on 3 May 2019 by BMG as a single from her greatest hits album, Step Back in Time: The Definitive Collection (2019). Minogue, Karen Poole, and DJ Fresh wrote the song for the 2018 country-influenced album, Golden, but it was ultimately not included. Scottish musician Mylo received additional co-writing credit for the use of a sample from "Drop the Pressure" (2004).

Minogue previewed the then-unreleased "New York City" to positive reaction at the Bowery Ballroom promotional concert for Golden. After completing the recording, she included it in her Golden Tour setlist. The studio version features Minogue performing freestyle rap over a funk-pop, and disco-pop infused track. Some music critics praised its upbeat nature, while others found it lackluster. Commercially, "New York City" entered several airplay and digital component charts in Australia, the United Kingdom, and Europe. A music video featuring footage from the Golden Tour was released days after the single release.

== Background and composition ==
After her final Parlophone release, the 2015 album Kylie Christmas and its 2016 reissue, Minogue signed with BMG Rights Management in February 2017, securing a deal that allowed her to release new music while retaining ownership of her catalog. For her next studio album, the country-tinged Golden (2018), Minogue had a two-week songwriting trip in Nashville and worked with a variety of collaborators. In August, English record producer DJ Fresh revealed that he was in the studio with Minogue and English songwriter Karen Poole. They co-wrote and recorded a demo of "New York City", but the track was ultimately excluded from the album.

In an April 2018 interview with Build, a live interview series of Yahoo, leading up to the release of Golden, Minogue mentioned "New York City" as a potential future release, despite it being an unfinished track from the writing sessions. Two months later, she performed the full track at the Bowery Ballroom, New York City during her promotional concert for Golden in June. The enthusiastic reaction from the audience encouraged her to go back to the studio and finish the track. "I don't think I've ever done that with a song – done a slapdash version of it just because we were in New York and then gone back and finished it", Minogue recalled. The track was produced solely by DJ Fresh, with backing vocals provided by Poole. Scottish producer Mylo received writing credit for the sample of his 2004 single "Drop the Pressure".

The song is a joyous ode to living it up amidst the glamour of New York City. Musically, it is set in the key of F# major with a tempo of 122 beats per minute. The song embraces a funk-pop, and disco-pop sound, with influence of techno music. The song incorporates synths and processed vocals, with Minogue performing cheeky freestyle rap verses throughout. Music critics commented on its departure from the country influences of Golden, with Steve Brown of Attitude felt the track brings Minogue back to her pop roots. Joe Lynch from Billboard commented that the track sounds "straight out of an early '80s Manhattan club" and the rap portion was influenced by Blondie's "Rapture" (1980).

== Release and reception ==
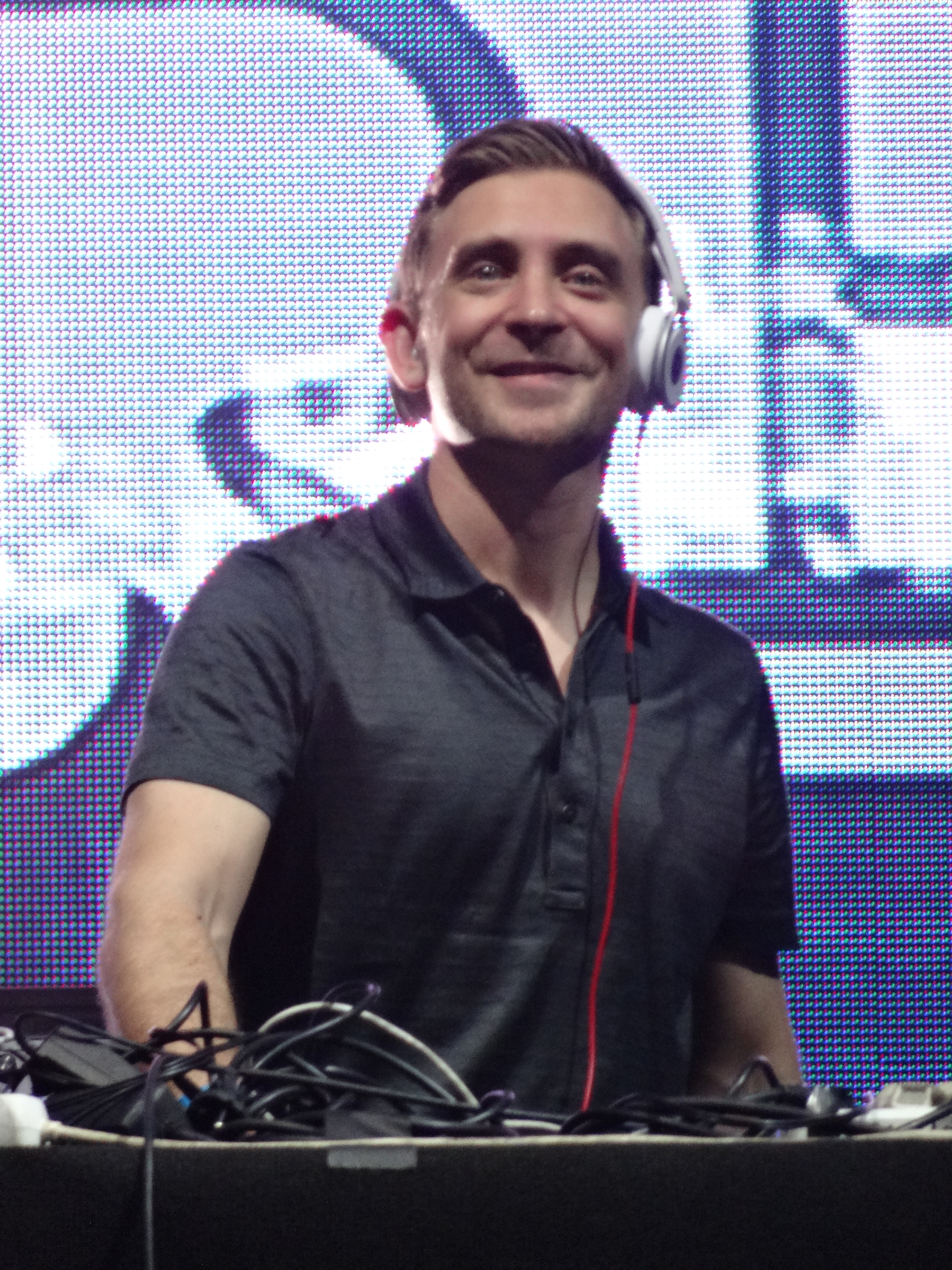
English record producer DJ Fresh (pictured in 2013) co-wrote, produced, and did a remix of "New York City".

"New York City" was released as a digital single on May 3, 2019, and was included on Minogue's greatest hits album Step Back in Time: The Definitive Collection (2019). It was the only original song on the 42-track compilation. While included on the CD tracklist, the song was only available as a digital bonus track on the vinyl release of Step Back in Time: The Definitive Collection. "New York City" premiered on BBC Radio 2 on the same day, during The Zoë Ball Breakfast Show. On 21 June, the DJ Fresh remix was released as a stand-alone single, distributed by record label BMG, and Minogue's own company Darenote Limited. To commemorate Stonewall 50 – WorldPride NYC 2019, DJ Toy Armada and DJ Grind made a remix of "New York City" available on SoundCloud in June 2019, dubbed as the "2019 WorldPride Remix".

The writers of The Sydney Morning Herald described the track as a "stupidly fun B-side", while Devki Nehra of Firstpost praised the nostalgic production of "New York City", calling it a "cute and peppy" track. Lynch and Mandy Rogers of EQ Music were pleased with the studio recording of "New York City", seeing it as a worthy addition to the compilation. Ian Gittins of Classic Pop felt the track was weak and contributed to the inconsistency of the second disc of Step Back in Time: The Definitive Collection.

In Australia, "New York City" peaked at number 38 on ARIA Digital Track Chart, which ranks the week's best-selling digital songs, during the week of 13 May 2019. In the United Kingdom, the track reached number 26 on UK Singles Downloads Chart, number 24 on the Airplay Chart, and number 31 on the Scottish Singles Charts. Despite missing the UK Singles Chart, "New York City" ranked among Minogue's top 40 most streamed songs in the UK by August 2023. In the Flanders region of Belgium, "New York City" peaked at number 16 on the Ultratip Bubbling Under chart, which ranks songs that have not yet entered the top 50.

== Promotion ==
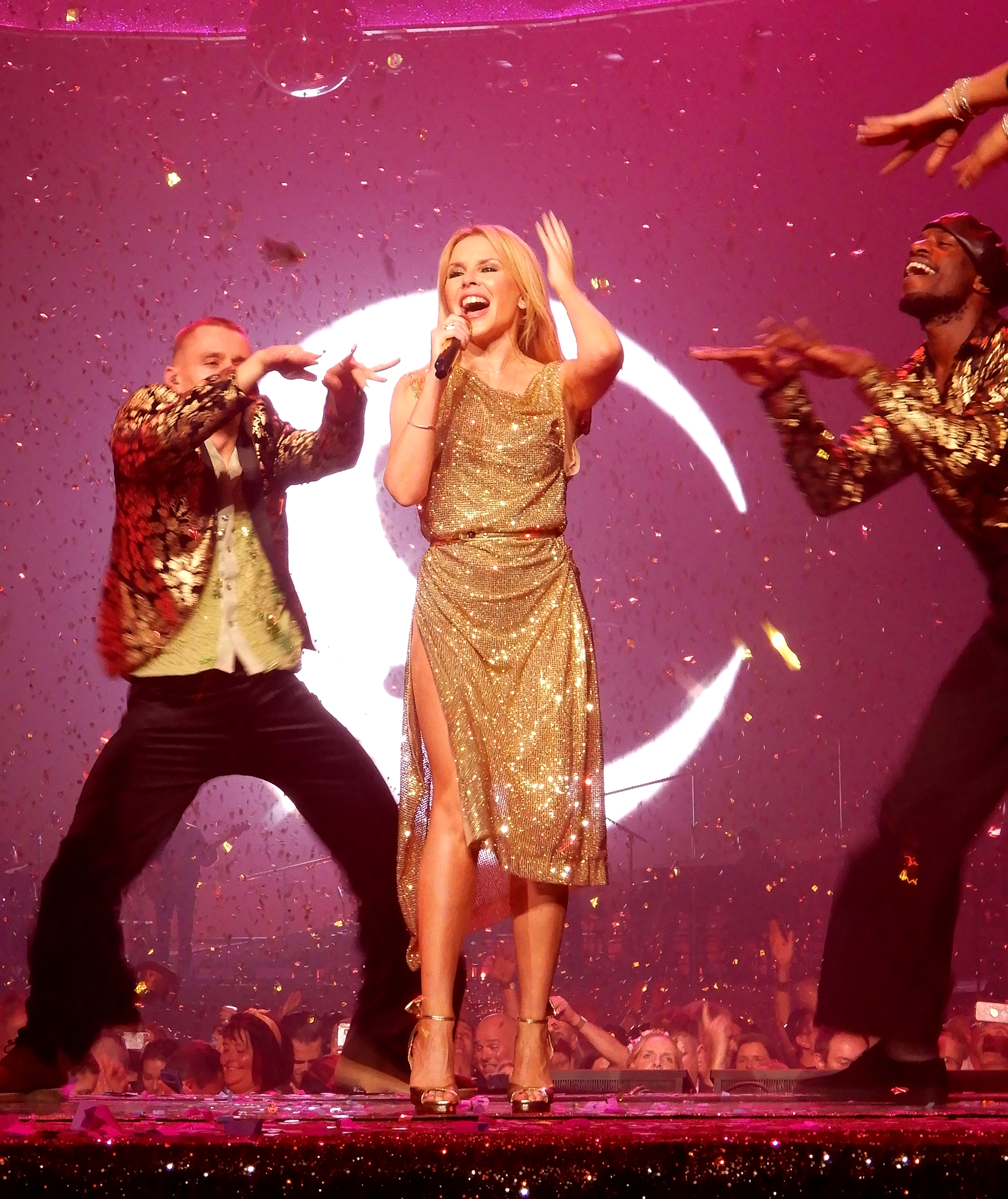
Minogue performing a medley of "New York City", "Raining Glitter" and "On a Night Like This" during the Golden Tour (2018–19)

Before its release, Minogue sang a verse of "New York City" during her interview with Build on 26 April 2018. Two months later, she performed the full track as a surprise at New York City's Bowery Ballroom on June 26 as part of her Kylie Presents: Golden promotional concerts. After the first encore performance, she unexpectedly reprised the track to an enthusiastic crowd. "We rehearsed it... and we were all spaced out with jetlag. And [the audience] gave us so much energy that we did it twice", Minogue recalled. According to Lynch, the audience sang along despite hearing it for the first time.

In September 2018, Minogue included it in the set list for the Golden Tour. "New York City" was performed during the final section, in a medley with "Raining Glitter" and "On a Night Like This" (2000). The section, titled Studio 54, paid homage to the renowned New York City nightclub. Minogue, performing in a sparkly gold dress, appeared with the Studio 54 logo displayed in the background. She performs a dance number with a group of drag kings and other dancers, surrounded by glitter and confetti. Nick Bond of news.com.au commented that Minogue channeled American singer Donna Summer for a "triumphant" act. The performance was included in the 2019 live album, titled Golden: Live in Concert. On 4 April 2025, she sang a portion of "New York City" during the audience request segment of the Tension Tour at Madison Square Garden in New York City.

On the morning of the track's release, it was announced during ITV breakfast show Lorraine that a music video for "New York City" would be released, comprising various clips of performances taken from Minogue's Golden Tour. The music video premiered on her official YouTube channel on 9 May. Daniel Megarry of Gay Times and Josh Milton of Gay Star News praised the video's colorful, celebratory atmosphere of queer inclusivity, with Milton further declaring its glamour so high as to make other music videos "look like PTA meetings".

== Credits and personnel ==
Credits adapted from Tidal and Step Back in Time: The Definitive Collection liner notes.

- Kylie Minogue – lead vocals, songwriting
- Karen Poole – backing vocals, songwriting
- DJ Fresh – guitar, horn, keyboards, mixing, songwriting, production
- Mylo – songwriting, sample credit for "Drop the Pressure"

== Charts ==
Chart (2019)	Peak position
Australia Digital Tracks (ARIA)	38
Belgium (Ultratip Bubbling Under Flanders)	16
Scotland Singles (Official Charts)	31
UK Airplay (Radiomonitor)	24
UK Singles Downloads (Official Charts)	26

== Release history ==
Region	Date	Format	Label	Ref.
Various	3 May 2019	Digital download; streaming	BMG; Parlophone	
Italy	3 May 2019	Contemporary hit radio	BMG	
United Kingdom	3 May 2019	Contemporary hit radio	BMG	
