= Kylie's Secret Night =

2019 British television program

- Created by: Gareth Collett
- Presented by: Alan Carr
- Starring: Kylie Minogue
- Country of origin: United Kingdom
- No. of episodes: 1

Production
- Executive producer: Kat Lennox Gareth Collett
- Production locations: London, United Kingdom
- Editor: Lee Smithurst
- Running time: 66:00
- Production company: BBC Studios

Original release
- Network: Channel 4
- Release: 25 December 2019

Kylie's Secret Night was a British Christmas television special featuring Australian recording artist Kylie Minogue. It was produced by BBC Studios and was hosted by comedian Alan Carr. The show was created as a way of thanks from Minogue to her fans, filmed in front of an audience at the Rivoli Ballroom who believed they had been invited to a "Kylie-themed fan extravaganza" but were surprised with an evening with her.

Kylie's Secret Night aired on Channel 4 on 25 December 2019 in the United Kingdom. It also aired on TVNZ 1 on 26 December in New Zealand, and on SBS on 8 February in Australia.

== Background ==
The show featured Carr interviewing the singer, as well as performances, gifts, hidden camera pranks and stunts. Part of the show involved Minogue paying a surprise visit to a musical theatre group made up of adults with autism and learning disabilities. She also shared a taxi with members of the public, with Carr directing her actions via a hidden earpiece. Speaking about the special, Minogue said:

This was such an incredible show. It made me laugh, it made me cry. It was like time stood still and I was able to hear some amazing fan stories, reminisce and really take stock of the journey we’ve been on together. All in all, a wonderful celebration, and a reminder of what a privilege it is to be able to connect with people over time and borders and to inspire me to do it all again.

Kylie's Secret Night aired on 25 December 2019, followed by the television premiere of her Golden Tour.

== Performances ==
1. "Can't Get You Out of My Head"
2. "Dancing"
3. "Hand on Your Heart" (The Abbey Road Sessions version)
4. "On a Night Like This"
5. "All the Lovers"
