= Golden (Kylie Minogue song) =

2018 single by Kylie Minogue

- Weiss remix cover

Single by Kylie Minogue

from the album Golden
- Released: 29 May 2018
- Recorded: 2017
- Studio: Sony ATV Studios (Nashville, TN)
- Genre: Country pop
- Length: 3:08
- Label: Darenote; BMG
- Songwriters: Kylie Minogue; Lindsay Rimes; Liz Rose; Steve McEwan
- Producer: Lindsay Rimes

Kylie Minogue singles chronology
"Stop Me from Falling" (2018)	"Golden" (2018)	"A Lifetime to Repair" (2018)

Music video
- "Golden" on YouTube

"Golden" is a song by Australian singer Kylie Minogue, taken from her fourteenth studio album of the same name (2018). It was released by Kylie's own company Darenote Limited and licensed to BMG Rights Management, as an album track, on 6 April 2018 for digital consumption. It was confirmed on 28 May 2018 as the third single from the album. The song impacted radio in Italy on 29 May 2018.

"Golden" was one of the three tracks that was written during Minogue's two week visit to Nashville, following the suggestion of a country music element for Golden, along with "Dancing" and "Sincerely Yours". The song was written by Minogue, Lindsay Rimes, Liz Rose and Steve McEwan, and was produced by Rimes. Musically, along with the previous singles, "Golden" is a pop song with elements of country music. Lyrically, it talks about living life and showing determination.

The music video for "Golden" was directed by Sophie Muller, who also directed the videos for "Dancing" and "Stop Me from Falling". It was recorded on a foot terrace Havana, Cuba, during the same time that the video for the Gente De Zona remix of "Stop Me from Falling" was filmed; Minogue uploaded a post to Instagram, captioning the photo: "We had no lights, no crew... no makeup!! It took some convincing from my Director, Sophie Muller but we did it!"

Minogue performed the song as the opening to the Kylie Presents Golden shows and on The Voice Kids UK.

== Background and composition ==
Following the suggestion from her A&R manager to incorporate country music into the album, Kylie Minogue spent two weeks in Nashville, Tennessee, where she wrote three songs for Golden: the lead single "Dancing", album track "Sincerely Yours" and "Golden"; Minogue felt that the location had had a "profound" effect on her, and what she'd learned about song writing had stayed with her once she'd returned to the UK, and lead her to be able to use a more story-telling aspect in her lyrics. Lyrically, "Golden" is a response to ageism Minogue feels she faces within the media and industry; regarding the lyrics of the song, she stated:

On "Golden", the line I had in my head was "we're not young, we're not old, we're golden." It didn't quite fit in, so we adapted it for the song. That was one example of trying to claim something that I felt I had no control over. Doing promo for my last album, I was often asked, "How does it feel to be a woman your age in this industry?" and I was just over it. For my own satisfaction, I wanted to be able to say that we just are who we are at any point in time….

"Golden" is a self-empowerment anthem, which has been described as a take on soundtracks from Spaghetti Western films, namely referencing Ennio Morricone's theme song to The Good, the Bad and the Ugly with the yodeling that appears at the start of the track. "Golden", like most of the songs from the album, uses a more organic production, and is backed by guitars, hand claps and a drum machine. "Golden" runs for three minutes and eight seconds.

== Release ==
"Golden" was released as the third official single from Golden on 28 May 2018, on Minogue's 50th birthday; a low-key video, show in Havana, Cuba, was released and uploaded to her official YouTube channel. The release came following the singles "Dancing", which was released in January 2018, and "Stop Me from Falling", which was also released as a remix featuring Gente de Zona, with the video also being shot in Havana, Cuba. "Golden" also marks the first time that one of Minogue's title tracks has been released as a single.

Initially, no digital releases for "Golden" appeared, in the way that there were for "Dancing", "Stop Me from Falling", and the promotional single "Raining Glitter"; however, one week after the release of the fourth single from Golden, "A Lifetime to Repair", a two-track digital remix EP for "Golden" was released, with two remixes from Weiss: a remix and an extended remix.

== Music video ==
The accompanying music video for "Golden" was shot in Havana, during filming the "Stop Me from Falling" remix with Cuban reggaeton duo Gente de Zona. The video was directed by Sophie Muller and produced by Gloria Bowman, who both shot the second video to Minogue's previous single, "Stop Me from Falling" remix. The video opens with shots of Minogue lounging on a bed and dancing in waves at a beach. Bright close-up shots of Minogue then appear between scenes of her singing and dancing on the beach. As the chorus starts, the shots alternate between the close-ups and the beach scenes. The second chorus then shows Minogue running through the streets at night, wearing a ball gown-like dress. The video then ends with a shot of Kylie smiling and walking towards the camera, wearing a red dress.

== Live performances ==
"Golden" was first performed live during the Kylie Presents Golden concerts in March 2018. On 21 July, she performed the song on The Voice Kids UK. "Golden" was also included as the opening song during various sets throughout 2018, including Minogue's performance at White Party Palm Springs."Golden" was performed as the opening song on the Golden Tour, where Minogue rose out of the stage atop a set of suitcases.

== Charts ==
Chart (2018)	Peak position
Belgium (Ultratip Bubbling Under Wallonia)	43

== Formats and track listing ==
- Digital download – Weiss Remix
1. "Golden" (Weiss Remix) - 3:01
2. "Golden" (Weiss Extended Remix) - 5:13

== Release history ==
Region	Date	Format	Label	Ref.
Italy	29 May 2018	Contemporary hit radio	BMG	
Various	24 August 2018	Digital download; streaming; (Weiss Remix)	Darenote; BMG	
