= Music's Too Sad Without You =

2018 single by Kylie Minogue and Jack Savoretti

Single by Kylie Minogue and Jack Savoretti

from the album Golden
- Released: 13 October 2018
- Recorded: 2017
- Studio: Hoxa HQ (London, England)
- Genre: Country pop
- Length: 4:10
- Label: Darenote; BMG
- Songwriters: Kylie Minogue; Jack Savoretti; Samuel Dixon
- Producer: Samuel Dixon

Kylie Minogue singles chronology
"A Lifetime to Repair" (2018)	"Music's Too Sad Without You" (2018)	"Sincerely Yours" (2018)

Jack Savoretti singles chronology
"Whiskey Tango" (2017)	"Music's Too Sad Without You" (2018)	"Candlelight" (2019)

Music video
- "Music's Too Sad Without You" on YouTube

"Music's Too Sad Without You" is a song recorded by Australian singer Kylie Minogue and English singer Jack Savoretti. It was released for contemporary hit radio on 13 October 2018 through BMG as the fifth single from Minogue's fourteenth studio album, Golden (2018). The song was written by Minogue, Savoretti and its producer Samuel Dixon. "Music's Too Sad Without You" has been described as a country-tinged ballad. Savoretti included a live performance of the song on the deluxe edition of his sixth studio album, Singing to Strangers (2019), and included the original version on the special edition of that album.

== Background and composition ==
"Music's Too Sad Without You" was written by Minogue, Savoretti and Samuel Dixon, whilst produced by Dixon. In October 2018, Minogue and Savoretti both teased at the song's music video, posting stills on social media. A day later, Minogue announced the song as the fifth and final single from Golden, with the radio edit of the song premiering on 13 October 2018 on BBC Radio 2. The song has been described as a country-tinged ballad.

== Music video ==
The music video for the song, directed by Joe Connor, was filmed in the Teatro La Fenice opera house in Venice, Italy. It premiered on YouTube on 15 October 2018 and has been viewed over 2.3 million times.

== Live performances ==
"Music's Too Sad Without You" was included on the set list for the Kylie Presents: Golden shows, with both Minogue and Savoretti performing the song. The song was also performed as part of the Venice Jazz Festival in July 2018. On 10 November 2018, Minogue and Savoretti performed the song on The Jonathan Ross Show. On 24 November 2018, they performed the song on Michael McIntyre's Big Show.

== Charts ==
Chart (2018)	Peak position
Croatia (HRT)	93
Scottish Singles Sales (Official Charts)	17
UK Singles Downloads (Official Charts)	17
UK Indie (Official Charts)	27

== Release history ==
Region	Date	Format	Label	Ref.
United Kingdom	13 October 2018	Contemporary hit radio	BMG	
Various	15 October 2018	Digital download	Darenote; BMG	
Italy	16 October 2018	Contemporary hit radio	BMG	
