= Golden Tour =

2018–19 concert tour by Kylie Minogue

- Tour by Kylie Minogue
- Promotional poster for the tour
- Location: Europe; Oceania
- Associated album: Golden
- Start date: 18 September 2018
- End date: 17 March 2019
- Legs: 2
- No. of shows: 33
- Supporting acts: Sonic Yootha; Jake Shears; Hatchie; Client Liaison
- Attendance: 178,225 (21 Reported Shows)
- Box office: $17,523,629 (21 Reported Shows)

Kylie Minogue concert chronology
- Kylie Presents Golden (2018); Golden Tour (2018–19); Summer 2019 (2019–20)

The Golden Tour was the fifteenth concert tour by Australian recording artist Kylie Minogue. It was launched in support of her fourteenth studio album, Golden (2018) and visited Europe and Australia. It began on 18 September 2018 in Newcastle, England at the Metro Radio Arena and concluded on 17 March 2019 in Mount Cotton, Australia at Sirromet Wines. The tour was announced in February 2018, consisting of dates only in the UK and Ireland. The previously announced European tour was incorporated in September of the same year, and the Australian leg was announced in November.

The concerts were divided into seven distinct sections: Desert Sunrise, The High & Dry, Nothing Behind Me, Everything Ahead of Me, The Lovers United, At the Picnic After the Biker Rally, New York City and an encore, The Nashville Rider. An interval halfway through the show separated the concert into two halves. Acting as creative director alongside Rob Sinclair, Minogue created a show narrative that was set in the 1970s and heavily influenced by Western films, featuring an abstract road movie which was presented on a large video screen. The retro influence of the concerts were also amplified by a "g"-shaped stage with a glittered runway. The tour received acclaim from music critics, who praised the shows for their simplicity in comparison to Minogue's previous tours.

The Golden Tour was also commercially successful. According to Billboard, the three concerts in London, England at the O_{2} Arena grossed $3,368,900 with 30,100 tickets sold, placing her at eighth spot for the biggest concerts of September 2018. Footage from the tour was also filmed across several nights, and was released on 6 December 2019 as Golden Live in Concert.

== Background ==
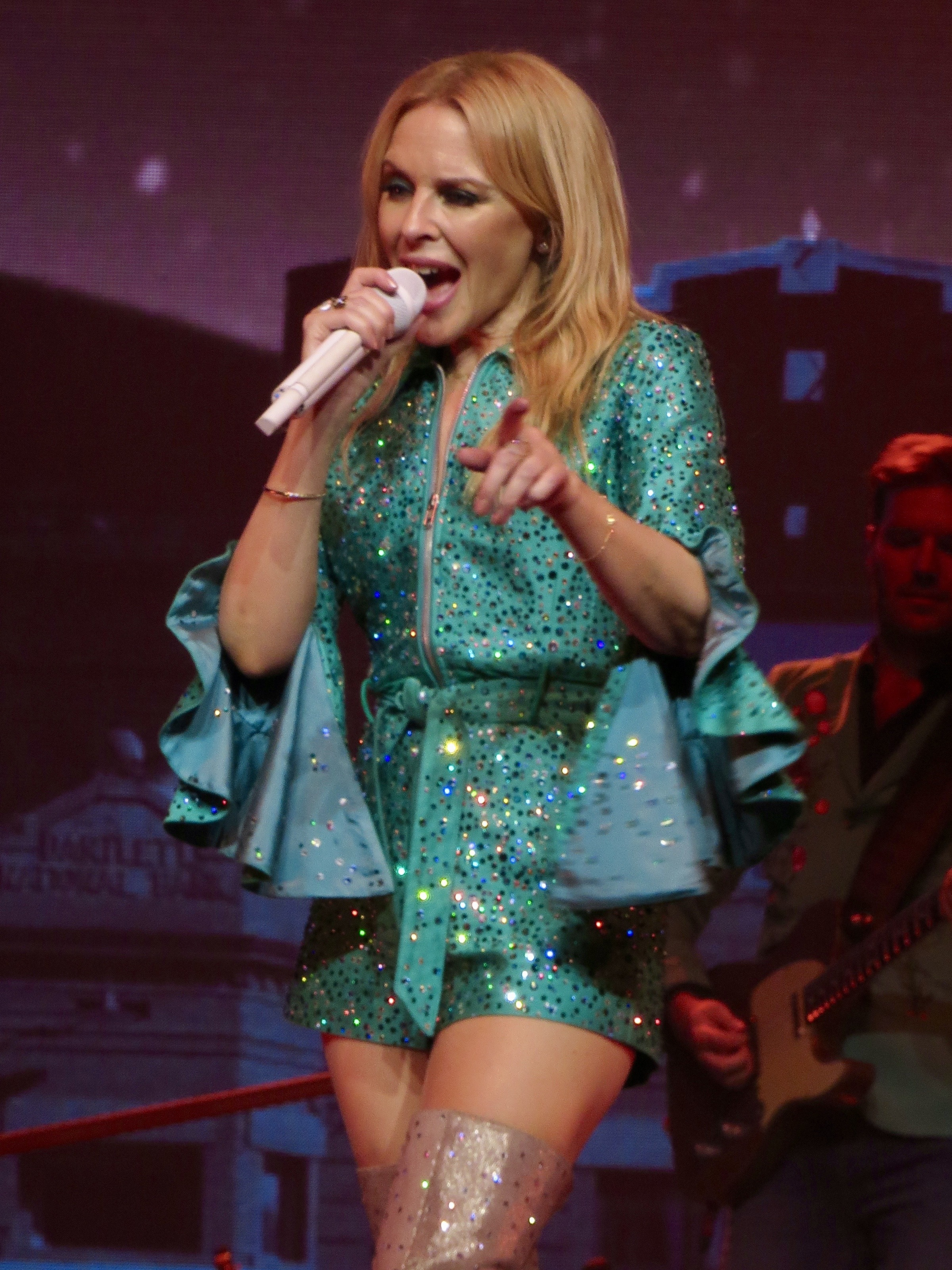
Minogue performing "Dancing" at the SSE Hydro in Glasgow

In February 2018, Minogue announced a series of concerts in smaller venues as part of the Kylie Presents Golden tour, to coincide with the expected release of the album. Later the same month, a new arena tour was announced with only UK and Ireland dates being confirmed. Discussing the development process of the tour, Minogue stated:

"We know we've got a good starting point with songs from this album, and everything else on top of that is… that's where the difficulties start. Which older songs do we choose? And how many surprise moments that are a little more obscure do we put in for super fans? It's a fun, yet slightly stressful part of the process."

In an interview on Good Morning Britain, Minogue explained that the shows would be split into "two halves", with an interval and a narrative throughout. She continued to say the setlist was mostly concrete at that point, mentioning "Raining Glitter" and "Lost Without You" as definite performances. Minogue's costumes for the tour were designed by Ralph & Russo, Kolchagov Barba, Paco Rabanne, Jitrois, Stevie Stewart and Wrangler.

Shortly before the tour commenced in September, Sonic Yootha were announced as the support act for the UK and Ireland dates, and the previously 12 announced European dates of the Kylie Presents Golden promotional tour scheduled for theatres and smaller arenas would be incorporated into the Golden Tour. On 7 November, Minogue announced the last six Australian dates for the Golden Tour, three of which were part of the "A Day on the Green" festival.

== Synopsis ==
The first act of the show Desert Sunrise opened with a guitar instrumental and a howling wind sound effect, showing a projection of a desert at night. A troupe of dancers in cowboy outfits walked onto the stage as the sun began to rise, before Minogue rose out of the floor sat atop of a stack of luggage, singing "Golden". Lights brightened to reveal the "g"-shaped staging and a "glittering golden runway", and Minogue then performed "Get Outta My Way" and "Better the Devil You Know". "One Last Kiss" was performed at the opening night in Newcastle, but removed from the set list after.

The second section The High & Dry began with an interlude of "Blue Velvet", with the video screen showing Minogue singing the song at a bar. She emerged, dressed in an all-white ensemble, to continue the rest of the song. Minogue then performed "Confide in Me" and "I Believe in You"; the latter was sung in place of "Breathe" (performed only at Newcastle). A short a cappella of "Where the Wild Roses Grow" was then performed as Minogue passes a rose through the crowd to the back of the venue, followed by "In Your Eyes". The second act concluded with a performance of "A Lifetime to Repair", with the singer stood atop of a pool table surrounded by her dancers.

The third section Nothing Behind Me, Everything Ahead of Me began with a performance of "Shelby '68" and "Radio On", with Minogue explaining the backstory behind both songs to the audience. A rendition of "Wow" was then performed, followed by a mash-up of "Can't Get You Out of My Head" and "The Chain". During this, Minogue wore a bespoke denim jacket, with an image of her and the name of the city being performed in embroidered into the back. A telephone box prop near the stage ramp began to ring and the lights dimmed, indicating the start of the twenty-minute interval. During which, a giant silver disco ball illuminated the venue.

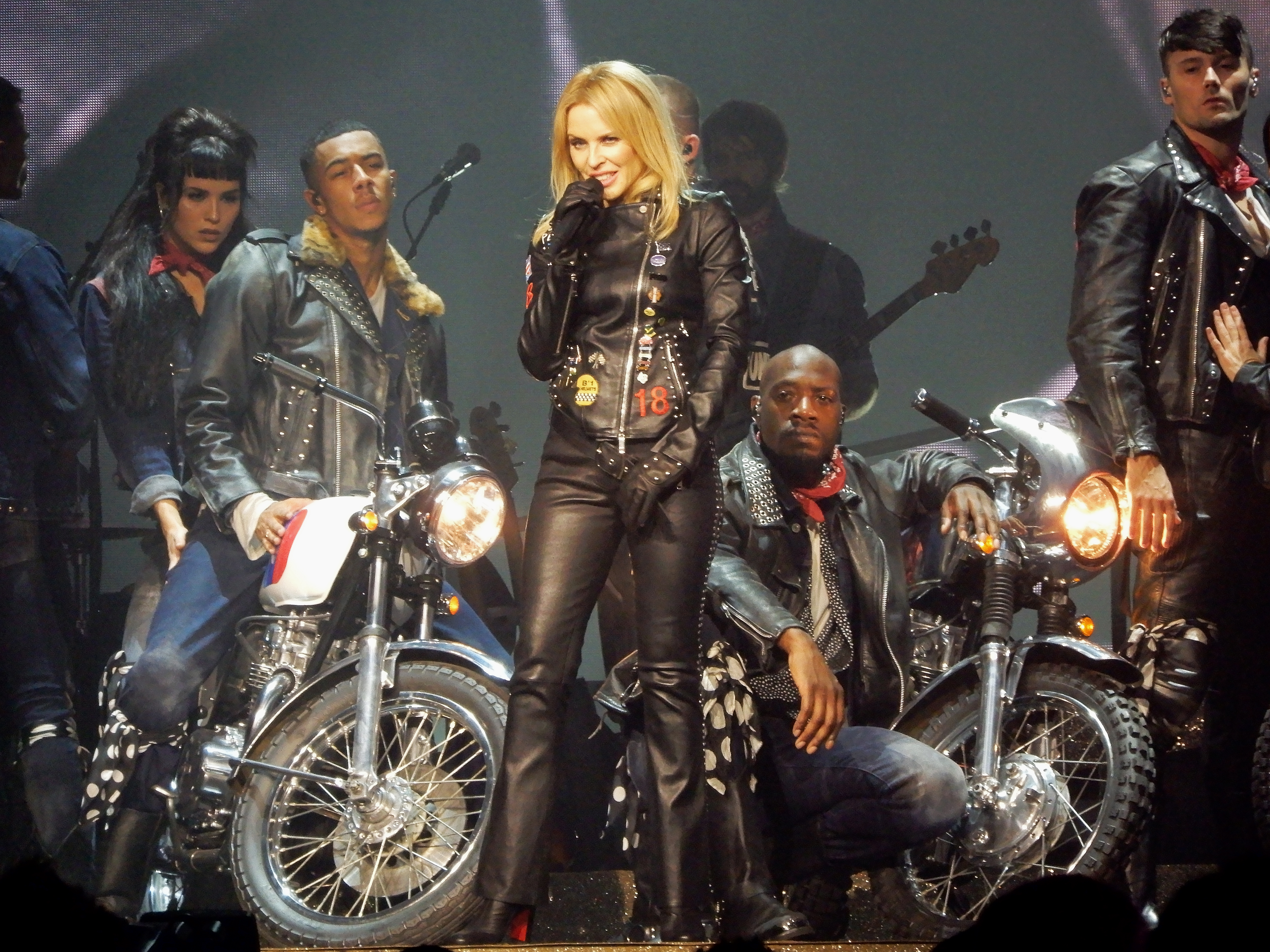
Minogue performing "Slow" at the Motorpoint Arena in Nottingham

After the interval, the dancers rose from the stage atop of illuminated motorcycles and Minogue appeared at the top of the stage ramp. She performed "Slow", starting the fourth section of the show, At the Biker Rally. Minogue and her backing vocalists then went on to perform "Kids", before the lights were dimmed and a rendition of "The One" was performed. Minogue then sang "Stop Me from Falling", where the section concluded.

The fifth section, At the Picnic After the Biker Rally, began with a medley of "Wouldn't Change a Thing" and "I'll Still Be Loving You", where Minogue performed whilst moving around the stage with the dancer Anders Nielsen, followed by "Especially for You". She then performed "Lost Without You", complete with a laser show, and "All the Lovers". The section finished with the conclusion of this song, following the use of rainbow coloured lights and multiple confetti drops.

The video screens then displayed the logo of the penultimate "Studio 54" section, with Minogue entering through the stage doors wearing a bespoke golden dress, alluding to the Spinning Around video. This dress feature near 120,000 Preciosa crystals. She performed a medley consisting of then-unreleased song "New York City", "Raining Glitter" and "On a Night Like This". A chugging steam train sound effect then followed, as Minogue performed a disco rendition of "The Loco-Motion". Concluding the section, "Spinning Around" was performed, with golden ribbons fired across the audience.

Minogue then thanked the audience and vacated the stage with her dancers, as the lights dimmed. The video screen showed a blue, sparkling background before Minogue reappeared and began the encore of the show, The Nashville Rider, performing "Love at First Sight". Minogue then performed an extended version of the album's lead single, "Dancing", and concluded the show by thanking her team and audience and exiting through the stage doors.

== Critical reception ==
The tour has gained acclaim from music critics. Simon Duke from The Evening Chronicle gave the opening night in Newcastle five stars with a positive review, saying that "Kylie dazzled in front of a set with visuals that looked like they'd been lifted straight from a picture perfect postcard of the Wild West". Duke stated that the "well executed and deliciously camp choreography [...] is a must see", being one of the best pop shows "ever experienced".

Adrian Caffery from The Birmingham Mail gave the Birmingham date 4 stars, stating that it was a "rollercoaster concert showcasing 30 years of Kylie [that] failed to disappoint", yet noted "there was a lot less spectacle than in previous Kylie concerts, with the extravagant stages [...] replaced by giant video screens." He concluded that "Kylie turned 50 this year, and on this evidence it's clear she still has the Midas' touch."

Jack Hardwick from The Daily Star stated that "the pint-sized singer looked hotter than ever as she belted out some of her biggest hits" whilst "wowing fans with her killer vocals and [...] sex appeal. For the opening London date at The O_{2} Arena, Hardwick gave the show 4 stars, stating that Minogue "wowed fans with a stellar set-list of her biggest hits and a healthy smattering of new album tracks". He commented positively on the simplicity of the show, saying that "Kylie doesn't need to rely on larger-than-life sets and jaw-dropping water spectacles to put on a killer show". Hardwick went on to praise Minogue's "faultless" vocals, concluding that "the show [was a] nostalgic trip down memory lane [...] [with] disco classics in the form of On a Night Like This, The Loco-Motion, Spinning Around and Love at First Sight." Gemma Sandways of The Evening Standard reviewed the same show, giving it 4 stars and stating that "there was a healthy helping of glamour [...] from the glittering gowns to the giant disco ball and metallic streamers unleashed". She concluded by saying that the "performance served as a welcome reminder of Minogue's generosity as a performer, and of the refreshing lack of cynicism with which she has always embraced all eras of her career".

== Set list ==
This set list is representative of the 20 September 2018 show in Nottingham. It does not represent all dates of the tour.

Act 1: The Desert Sunrise

1. "Golden"
2. "Get Outta My Way"
3. "Better the Devil You Know"

Act 2: The High and Dry

4. "Blue Velvet" (Video Interlude)
5. "Confide in Me"
6. "I Believe in You"
7. "Where the Wild Roses Grow"
8. "In Your Eyes"
9. "A Lifetime to Repair"

Act 3:Nothing Behind Me, Everything Ahead of Me

10. "Shelby '68"
11. "Radio On"
12. "Wow"
13. "Can't Get You Out of My Head" (contains elements of "The Chain")

Act 4: At the Biker Rally / The Lovers United

14. "Slow" (contains elements of "Being Boiled")
15. "Kids"
16. "The One"
17. "Stop Me from Falling"

Act 5: At The Picnic After The Biker Rally

18. "Wouldn't Change a Thing" / "I'll Still Be Loving You"
19. "Especially for You"
20. "Lost Without You"
21. "All the Lovers"

Act 6: New York City / Studio 54

22. "New York City" / "Raining Glitter" / "On a Night Like This"
23. "The Loco-Motion" (contains elements of "Bad Girls")
24. "Spinning Around"

Encore / The Nashville Rider

25. "Love at First Sight"
26. "Dancing"

=== Notes ===
- "One Last Kiss", "Breathe", and "Je Ne Sais Pas Pourquoi" were performed during the opening show in Newcastle.
- "I Believe in You" was added to the set list on 20 September 2018.
- During the show in Leeds, Minogue performed "Neighbours".
- From 8 to 24 November 2018, "Get Outta My Way", "I Believe in You" and "Radio On" were temporarily cut from the set list. "I Believe In You" and "Radio On" were then permanently cut for Australian dates, although "Get Outta My Way" was performed.
- "2 Hearts" was performed during the shows in Paris and Vienna.
- During the show in Paris, Minogue performed "Your Disco Needs You" as an audience request.
- During the show in Vienna, Minogue performed "In My Arms" as part of the encore.
- During the shows in Dublin and Belfast, Minogue performed "Let It Snow" as part of the encore.

== Tour dates ==
List of 2018 concerts
Date (2018)	City	Country	Venue	Supporting acts	Attendance	Revenue
18 September	Newcastle	United Kingdom	Metro Radio Arena	Sonic Yootha	7,579 / 9,899	$710,213
20 September	Nottingham	United Kingdom	Motorpoint Arena	Sonic Yootha	7,722 / 8,000	$692,803
21 September	Birmingham	United Kingdom	Genting Arena	Sonic Yootha	11,501 / 13,196	$1,077,040
22 September	Bournemouth	United Kingdom	Windsor Hall	Sonic Yootha	—N/a	—N/a
24 September	Cardiff	United Kingdom	Motorpoint Arena	Sonic Yootha	—N/a	—N/a
26 September	London	United Kingdom	The O_{2} Arena	Sonic Yootha	30,100 / 43,227	$3,368,900
27 September	London	United Kingdom	The O_{2} Arena	Sonic Yootha	30,100 / 43,227	$3,368,900
28 September	London	United Kingdom	The O_{2} Arena	Sonic Yootha	30,100 / 43,227	$3,368,900
30 September	Glasgow	United Kingdom	SSE Hydro	Sonic Yootha	11,206 / 11,443	$1,041,470
1 October	Manchester	United Kingdom	Manchester Arena	Sonic Yootha	10,716 / 13,811	$998,705
3 October	Liverpool	United Kingdom	Echo Arena	Sonic Yootha	8,114 / 10,079	$763,083
4 October	Leeds	United Kingdom	First Direct Arena	Sonic Yootha	11,419 / 11,711	$1,022,690
8 November	Brussels	Belgium	Cirque Royal	Sonic Yootha	—N/a	—N/a
9 November	Paris	France	Grande Seine	Sonic Yootha	—N/a	—N/a
10 November	Zürich	Switzerland	Samsung Hall	Sonic Yootha	—N/a	—N/a
12 November	Padua	Italy	Gran Teatro Geox	Sonic Yootha	3,835 / 4,200	$532,168
13 November	Munich	Germany	Zenith Munich	Sonic Yootha	—N/a	—N/a
14 November	Vienna	Austria	Bank Austria Halle	Sonic Yootha	—N/a	—N/a
18 November	Frankfurt	Germany	Jahrhunderthalle	Sonic Yootha	—N/a	—N/a
19 November	Berlin	Germany	Tempodrom	Sonic Yootha	—N/a	—N/a
20 November	Cologne	Germany	Palladium	Sonic Yootha	—N/a	—N/a
22 November	Amsterdam	Netherlands	AFAS Live	Sonic Yootha	4,058 / 5,500	$271,279
23 November	Copenhagen	Denmark	Royal Danish Theatre	Sonic Yootha	—N/a	—N/a
24 November	Hamburg	Germany	Mehr! Theater	Sonic Yootha	—N/a	—N/a
3 December (Note: The 3 December 2018 show in Dublin, Ireland at the 3Arena was originally scheduled to take place 7 October 2018.)	Dublin	Ireland	3Arena	Sonic Yootha	7,606 / 12,256	$756,588
5 December (Note: The 5 December 2018 show in Belfast, Northern Ireland at the SSE Arena was originally scheduled to take place 8 October 2018.)	Belfast	United Kingdom	SSE Arena	Sonic Yootha	5,290 / 8,741	$480,665

List of 2019 concerts
Date (2019)	City	Country	Venue	Supporting acts	Attendance	Revenue
5 March	Sydney	Australia	ICC Sydney Theatre	Client Liaison; Jake Shears	12,659 / 12,996	$1,401,030
6 March	Sydney	Australia	ICC Sydney Theatre	Client Liaison; Jake Shears	12,659 / 12,996	$1,401,030
9 March (Note: The 9 March 2019 show in Perth, Australia at the Sir James Mitchell Park was part of "A Day on the Green" concert series.)	Perth	Australia	Sir James Mitchell Park	Client Liaison; Hatchie; Jake Shears	8,584 / 9,379	$970,290
11 March	Adelaide	Australia	Adelaide Entertainment Centre	Jake Shears	4,933 / 7,000	$462,349
13 March	Melbourne	Australia	Sidney Myer Music Bowl	Jake Shears	10,903 / 10,903	$875,757
16 March (Note: The 16 March 2019 show in Hunter Valley, Australia at Bimbadgen was part of "A Day on the Green" concert series.)	Hunter Valley	Australia	Bimbadgen	Hatchie; Jake Shears	11,000 / 11,000	$1,161,300
17 March (Note: The 17 March 2019 show in Mount Cotton, Australia at Sirromet Wines was part of "A Day on the Green" concert series.)	Mount Cotton	Australia	Sirromet Wines	Hatchie; Jake Shears	13,000 / 13,000	$1,347,330

=== Cancelled concerts ===
List of cancelled concerts
Date (2018)	City	Country	Venue	Reason	Ref.
6 November	Esch-sur-Alzette	Luxembourg	Rockhal	Scheduling conflicts	

== Golden Live in Concert ==
Golden Live in Concert
- Deluxe edition artwork

Video by Kylie Minogue
- Released: 6 December 2019
- Recorded: 2018
- Venues: The O2 Arena (London, England)
- Genres: Pop; country pop
- Length: 124:00
- Label: BMG

Kylie Minogue chronology
Step Back in Time: The Definitive Collection (2019)	Golden Live in Concert (2019)	Disco (2020)

Kylie Minogue video chronology
A Kylie Christmas – Live from the Royal Albert Hall 2015 (2016)	Golden Live in Concert (2019)

Golden Live in Concert is the concert film of its corresponding tour. The film was recorded over various shows, and was released on 6 December 2019 in a 2CD and DVD format. The DVD contains the full live performance plus extra bonus features "We Are Golden" while the live album includes all audio tracks performed on the DVD footage.

The release of the DVD was announced on 7 October 2019 which coincided with the announcement of the extended repackage of Step Back in Time: The Definitive Collection and as a teaser for the DVD Minogue uploaded a video of the performance of "Lost Without You". On 18 October 2019 the performance of "Golden" was uploaded to Minogue's YouTube channel followed by the performance of "The Loco-Motion" which was uploaded on 5 December 2019. The DVD was released in two different formats: a digipack standard edition and a hardcover book deluxe edition which was available exclusively on her web store for a limited period of time.

A recording of the show aired on Channel 4 on Christmas Day 2019 following the broadcast of Minogue's television special, Kylie's Secret Night. This broadcast was edited into an hour-long special, featuring the following:

1. "Golden"
2. "Better the Devil You Know"
3. "Confide in Me"
4. "Wow"
5. "Can't Get You Out of My Head"
6. "Slow" / "Being Boiled"
7. "Kids"
8. "Stop Me from Falling"
9. "All the Lovers"
10. "The Loco-Motion"
11. "Spinning Around"
12. "Love at First Sight"
13. "Dancing"

This broadcast was also shown on Channel 9 in Australasia on New Year's Eve, and was altered slightly to include behind the scenes interviews and footage.

=== Track listing ===
Golden Live in Concert – DVD track listing
No.	Title	Writer(s)	Producer(s)	Length
1.	"Golden" (Intro)	Steve Anderson		2:19
2.	"Golden"	Kylie Minogue; Lindsay Rimes; Liz Rose; McEwan	Rimes	3:11
3.	"Get Outta My Way"	Lucas Secon; Damon Sharpe; Peter Wallevik; Daniel Davidsen; Mich Hansen	Cutfather; Wallevik; Davidsen; Sharpe; Secon; Stuart Price	4:18
4.	"Better the Devil You Know"	Mike Stock; Matt Aitken; Pete Waterman	Stock Aitken Waterman	3:52
5.	"Blue Velvet"	Bernie Wayne; Lee Morris		2:51
6.	"Confide in Me"	Anderson; Dave Seaman; Owain Barton	Brothers in Rhythm	4:03
7.	"I Believe in You"	Minogue; Jake Shears; Babydaddy	Shears; Babydaddy	4:30
8.	"Where the Wild Roses Grow"	Nick Cave	Tony Cohen; Victor Van Vugt	0:34
9.	"In Your Eyes"	Minogue; Richard Stannard; Julian Gallagher; Howes	Stannard; Gallagher	4:10
10.	"A Lifetime to Repair"	Minogue; Sky Adams; Shah; Kiris Houston	Adams	3:38
11.	"Shelby '68"	Minogue; Howes; Stannard; Daunt	Howes; Stannard; Daunt	5:36
12.	"Radio On"	Minogue; Wadge; Jonathan Green	Jon Green	4:04
13.	"Wow"	Minogue; Karen Poole; Greg Kurstin	Kurstin; Poole	3:13
14.	"Can't Get You Out of My Head"	Cathy Dennis; Rob Davis	Dennis; Davis	4:28
15.	"The Chain"	Lindsey Buckingham; Mick Fleetwood; Christine McVie; John McVie; Stevie Nicks		2:17
16.	"Slow / Being Boiled"	Minogue: Daniel Carey; Emilíana Torrini; Philip Oakey; Martyn Ware; Ian Craig Marsh		5:21
17.	"Kids"	Robbie Williams; Guy Chambers	Chambers; Steve Power	4:44
18.	"The One"	Minogue; Stannard; James Wiltshire; Russell Small; John Andersson; Johan Emmoth; Emma Holmgren	Stannard; Freemasons	5:25
19.	"Stop Me from Falling"	Minogue; Adams; McEwan; Danny Shah	Adams	4:18
20.	"Wouldn't Change a Thing"	Stock; Aitken; Waterman	Stock Aitken Waterman	3:03
21.	"I'll Still Be Loving You"	Stock; Aitken; Waterman	Stock Aitken Waterman	0:43
22.	"Especially for You"	Stock; Aitken; Waterman	Stock Aitken Waterman	4:48
23.	"Lost Without You"	Minogue; Green	Green; Charlie Russell	4:08
24.	"All the Lovers"	Jim Eliot; Mima Stilwell	Eliot; Price	3:36
25.	"New York City"	Minogue; Daniel Stein; Poole; Myles MacInnes	DJ Fresh	3:39
26.	"Raining Glitter"	Minogue; Alex Smith; Mark Taylor; Francis White	Smith; Taylor; White	0:54
27.	"On a Night Like This"	Steve Torch; Graham Stack; Mark Taylor; Brian Rawling	Stack; Taylor	1:58
28.	"The Loco-Motion"	Gerry Goffin; Carole King	Stock Aitken Waterman	3:50
29.	"Spinning Around"	Ira Shickman; Osborne Bingham; Kara DioGuardi; Paula Abdul	Mike Spencer	4:42
30.	"Love at First Sight"	Minogue; Stannard; Gallagher; Ash Howes; Martin Harrington	Stannard; Gallagher	6:07
31.	"Dancing"	Minogue; Nathan Chapman; McEwan	Adams	6:02
32.	"Credits"			1:35
33.	"We Are Golden" (Bonus feature)			6:05
Total length:				124:00

Golden Live in Concert – CD (Disc one)
No.	Title	Length
1.	"Golden" (Intro)	2:19
2.	"Golden"	3:11
3.	"Get Outta My Way"	4:18
4.	"Better the Devil You Know"	3:52
5.	"Blue Velvet"	2:51
6.	"Confide in Me"	4:03
7.	"I Believe in You"	4:30
8.	"Where the Wild Roses Grow"	0:34
9.	"In Your Eyes"	4:10
10.	"A Lifetime to Repair"	3:38
11.	"Shelby '68"	5:36
12.	"Radio On"	4:04
13.	"Wow"	3:13
14.	"Can't Get You Out of My Head"	4:28
15.	"The Chain"	2:17
Total length:		53:02

Golden Live in Concert – CD (Disc two)
No.	Title	Length
1.	"Slow / Being Boiled"	5:21
2.	"Kids"	4:44
3.	"The One"	5:25
4.	"Stop Me from Falling"	4:18
5.	"Wouldn't Change a Thing"	3:03
6.	"I'll Still Be Loving You"	0:43
7.	"Especially For You"	4:48
8.	"Lost Without You"	4:08
9.	"All the Lovers"	3:36
10.	"New York City"	3:39
11.	"Raining Glitter"	0:54
12.	"On a Night Like This"	1:58
13.	"The Loco-Motion"	3:50
14.	"Spinning Around"	4:42
15.	"Love at First Sight"	6:07
16.	"Dancing"	6:02
Total length:		63:17

=== Charts ===
Chart performance for Golden Live in Concert
Chart (2019)	Peak position
Australian Albums (ARIA)	13
Belgian Albums (Ultratop Flanders)	90
Belgian Albums (Ultratop Wallonia)	72
French Albums (SNEP)	121
Scottish Albums (Official Charts)	13
UK Albums (Official Charts)	23
UK Independent Albums (Official Charts)	2
US Independent Albums (Billboard)	13

== Personnel ==
Adapted from the tour programme credits.

Production

- Kylie Minogue – creative director
- Rob Sinclair – creative director
- Steve Anderson – musical director
- Blue Leach – multi camera director
- Ashley Wallen – choreographer
- Rob Sinclair – production, lighting designer
- Tully Bloom – personal assistant
- Christian Vermaak – hair and makeup
- Emma Banks – hair and makeup
- Chris Ibbs – hair and makeup
- Tony Evans – head of security

Band

- Christian Gulino – band leader, keyboards
- Tom Meadows – drums
- Luke Fitton – guitar
- Luke Higgins – guitar
- Jamie Sefton – bass
- Adetoun Anibi – backing vocals (all dates)
- Abbie Osmon – backing vocals (selected dates)
- Kirsten Joy - backing vocals (selected dates)
- Katie Holmes-Smith - backing vocals (selected dates)

Dancers

- Jenny Griffin – dance captain
- Katie Collins – dancer
- Shaun Niles – dancer
- Anders Neilsen – dancer
- Kane Horn – dancer
- Yves Cueni – dancer
- Jake Leigh – dancer
- Ben Hukin – dancer

Costumes

- Frank Strachan – costume stylist
- Sascha Lilic – fashion consultant
- Ralph & Russo – costume design
- Jitrois – costume design
- Gamba Shoes – costume design
- Paco Rabanne – costume design
- Stevie Stewart – costume design
- Rellik – costume design
- Kolchagov Barba – costume design
- Preciosa – crystal embellishments
- Deborah Tallentire – costume design
- Davida Helmets – costume design
- London Embroidery Studio – costume design
- Wrangler – costume design
- Alida Herbst – costume design
- Carine Gilson – costume design

Creative associates

- Ali Pike – associate lighting designer
- Jenny Griffin – associate choreographer
- Noel Jones, Peter Graham – sound recording
- Nev Bull – video programmer
- Luke Rolls – draftsman
- Michael Al-Far – render artist
- Nicola Mills – storyline
- George Sinclair – creative producer

Visuals

- Blink Inc – video content
- Kirsten McFie – video content producer
- Paige Kauffman – US video content producer
- Thomas English – director of photography
- Edwin Eversole – director of photography
- Rupa Rathod – lead editor, motion graphics
- Richard Cullen – technical director
- Kevin Ramser – motion graphics
- Simon Davies – art director

Crew

- Kevin Pruce – FDH sound engineer
- Gavin Tempany – monitor engineer
- Will Sanderson – playback tech
- Nick Sizer – drum tech
- Mark 'McKinty' Gordon – guitar tech
- Phil Murphy – stage manager
- Lee Freeman – assistant stage manager
- Frank Strachan – wardrobe
- Anne-Marie Bigby – head of wardrobe
- Kerry West – assistant head of wardrobe
- Josh Thomas – RF tech
- Jonny Buck – audio crew tech
- Don Parks – system tech
- Beth O'Leary – monitor tech
- Mark O'Neill – PA
- Tom Gardener – PA
- Ali Pike – lighting operator
- Ben Cash – lighting programmer
- Aidan McCabe – lighting crew chief
- Jacob Black – lighting crew
- Michael Sanchez – lighting crew
- John Hetherton – lighting crew
- Matt Morris – lighting crew
- Jonty Rivers – zactrack
- Aaron Veness – zactrack
- Andy Joyes – video crew chief, LED tech
- Nev Bull – media server operator
- Briony Margetts – racks/system engineer
- Matt Peers – LED tech
- Lee Hunter – LED tech
- John Brandon – LED tech
- Chris Johnson – LED tech
- Matt Doughty – LED tech
- Matt Brown – camera operator
- Jamie Cowlin – camera operator
- Danny Sheldon – camera operator
- Seth Griffiths – lasers, special effects
- Bradley Saunders – lasers, special effects
- Andy Roberts – rigger
- Domonick Warrington – rigger, Kinesys
- Rick Worsfold – head carpenter
- Pete Geary – set carpenter
- Jackson Wheeler – set carpenter
- Jack Crane – set carpenter
- Charlie Pollington – physio
- David Lopez-Edwards – backstage filming
- Simon Raynor – catering
- Steffy Head – catering
- Lincoln Jefferson – catering
- Cherry Pashby – catering
- Stuart Butler – catering
- Eddie McQueen – catering
- Graham Brumhead – bus driver
- Richard Deane – bus driver
- Mike Fields – bus driver
- Ian Staveley – bus driver
- Tony Ackroyd – bus driver
- Kevin Watson – bus driver

Tour promoters

- Andy Copping – promotion
- Steve Horner – promotion
- Simon Moran – promotion
- Cathy Wilson – promotion
- Peter Aiken – promotion

Suppliers

- Graham Miller – video
- Matthew Ilott – lighting
- Ben Brookes – staging
- Matt Kaye – staging
- Ewan Ashburn – staging
- Wendy Deans – catering
- Robin Conway – sound
- Paul Timmins – sound
- Marc Webber – lasers, special effects
- Howard Eaton Lighting – props
- Lily Mollgaard – props
- Dave Simmons – props
- Lisa Buckley – props
- Andy Gray – bussing
- David Coumbe – trucking
- Matt Jackson – trucking
- Paul Walker – trucking
- Ian Patterson – travel
- Maria Taylor – travel
- Izzi Robinson – travel
- Tim Cox – accreditation
- Nigel Jones – legal
- David Cushion – accounting
- Lottie Prosser – accounting
- Rima Bavalia – accounting
