= Kylie Presents Golden =

2018 concert tour by Kylie Minogue

Kylie Presents: Golden
- Promotional tour by Kylie Minogue
- Promotional handbill for the tour
- Location: Europe; North America
- Associated album: Golden
- Start date: 13 March 2018
- End date: 25 June 2018
- Legs: 2
- No. of shows: 6

Kylie Minogue concert chronology
- A Kylie Christmas (2015–16); Kylie Presents Golden (2018); Golden Tour (2018–2019)

Kylie Presents Golden was a promotional tour by Australian recording artist Kylie Minogue, in support of her fourteenth studio album, Golden (2018). The tour comprised five shows in Europe and one show in North America.

== Background ==
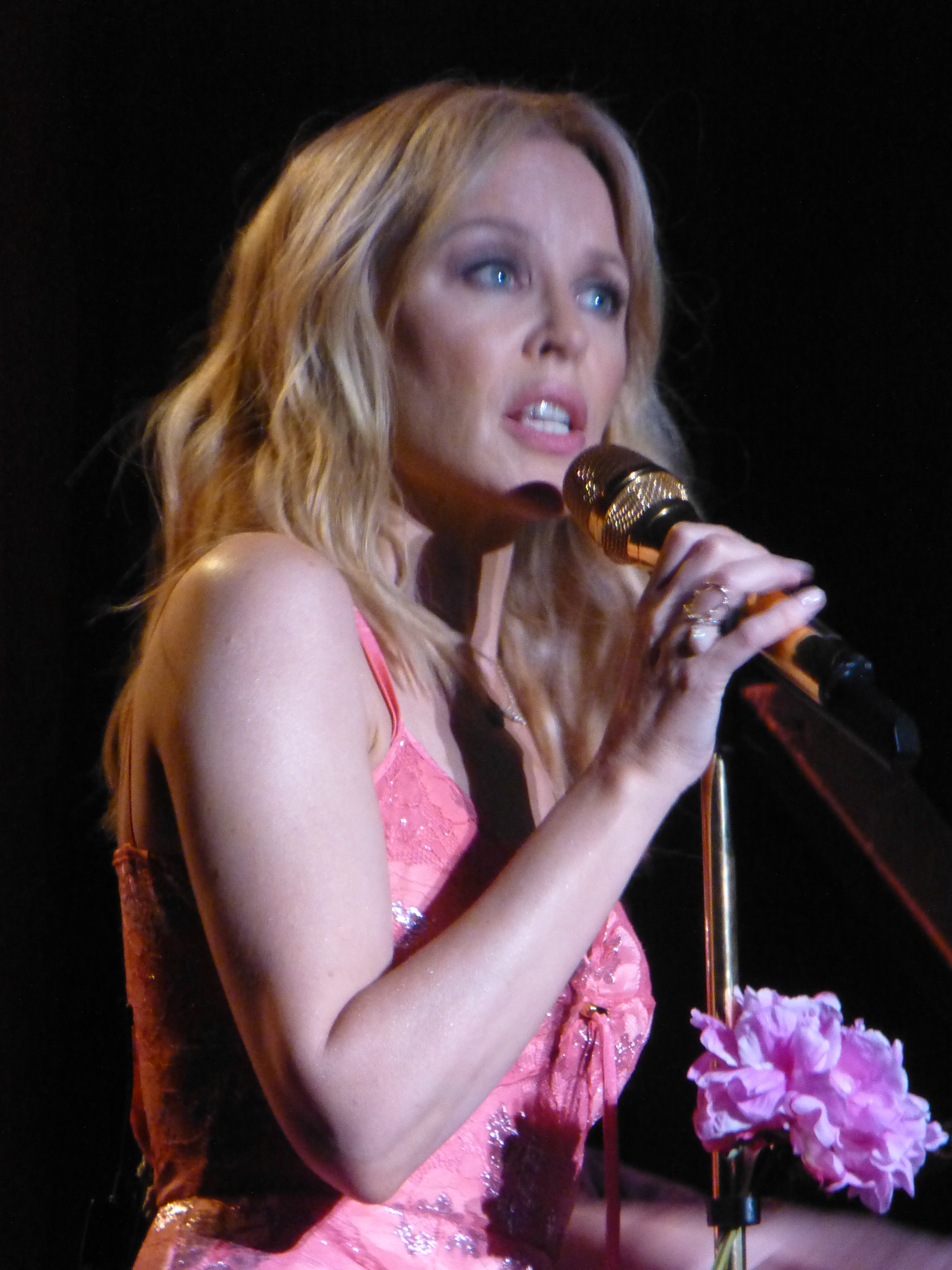
Minogue performing during her concert in New York City

In contrast to Minogue's previous tours (with the exception of the Anti Tour), the singer conducted the tour as a short strip of concerts in small venues, performing to reduced crowds and in an intimate setting.

Speaking on the tour, Minogue stated:

"I'm so excited to perform songs from my new album Golden in these iconic European clubs. Each of these venues is very special and—just as I found making the new album in Nashville to be so energising—these shows will be new, intimate and fun. I just can’t wait to bring these new songs to life and of course, throw in a few surprises for my fans."

In July 2018, Minogue announced an additional thirteen European concerts, which were planned to be a part of the promotional tour. These shows were scheduled to take place in November, consisting of her and her band "sharing the new album" with "a few surprises". However, in late September, Minogue announced that these dates would instead be part of the Golden Tour.

== Setlist ==
The following setlist was obtained from the concert held on 13 March 2018, at Café de Paris in London, England. It does not represent all shows.

1. "Golden"
2. "One Last Kiss"
3. "Raining Glitter"
4. "Breathe"
5. "Put Yourself in My Place"
6. "Shelby '68"
7. "Radio On"
8. "Islands in the Stream" (contains excerpts of "SOS")
9. "The One"
10. "A Lifetime to Repair"
11. "Music's Too Sad Without You" (with Jack Savoretti)
12. "Hand on Your Heart"
13. "All the Lovers"
14. "Stop Me from Falling"
15. "Sincerely Yours"
16. "Dancing"

=== Notes ===
- "Music's Too Sad Without You" was not performed in Manchester or New York City.
- At the show in New York City, "Love at First Sight", "Slow" and "Your Disco Needs You" were performed.
- "New York City", a then-unreleased song, was performed twice at the show on 25 June 2018.

== Tour dates ==
Date	City	Country	Venue
Europe
13 March 2018	London	England	Café de Paris
14 March 2018	Manchester	England	Gorilla
16 March 2018	Barcelona	Spain	Sala Bikini
18 March 2018	Paris	France	Café de la Danse
20 March 2018	Berlin	Germany	Berghain
North America
25 June 2018	New York City	United States	Bowery Ballroom

Cancellations and rescheduled shows

29 March 2018	Sydney, Australia	Nova Red Room	Cancelled
