= Golden (Kylie Minogue album) =

2018 album by Kylie Minogue

Studio album by Kylie Minogue
- Released: 6 April 2018
- Recorded: 2017
- Studios: Phrased Differently (London, England); Sony ATV Studios (Nashville, TN); Rhythm House (Nashville, TN); The Biffcotheque (Brighton, England); Metrophonic Studios (London, England); Hoxa HQ (London, England)
- Genres: Pop; country pop; dance-pop
- Length: 40:33
- Labels: BMG; Darenote; Liberator Music
- Producers: Ash Howes; Richard "Biff" Stannard; Sky Adams; Lindsay Rimes; Jesse Frasure; Jon Green; Alex Smith; Mark Taylor; Eg White; Samuel Dixon; Charlie Russel; Seton Daunt

Kylie Minogue chronology
| Kylie Christmas (2015) | Golden (2018) | Step Back in Time: The Definitive Collection (2019) |

Singles from Golden
- 1. "Dancing" Released: 19 January 2018; 2. "Stop Me from Falling" Released: 9 March 2018; 3. "Golden" Released: 29 May 2018; 4. "A Lifetime to Repair" Released: 17 August 2018; 5. "Music's Too Sad Without You" Released: 13 October 2018; 6. "Sincerely Yours" Released: 9 November 2018

Golden is the fourteenth studio album by Australian singer Kylie Minogue. On 6 April 2018, BMG Rights Management and Minogue's company Darenote made it available in a variety of formats. This is Minogue's first album with BMG, and her first musical release since Kylie Christmas (2015). Minogue began work on the album in London and Los Angeles before briefly visiting Nashville. She was inspired by Nashville's culture and music, particularly its country music influences. Inspired by her journey, she enlisted several producers to create new music, including Ash Howes, Richard "Biff" Stannard, Sky Adams, Alex Smith, and Mark Taylor, among others.

Golden represents Minogue's musical shift away from traditional dance-pop music and towards country-infused pop and dance music. Minogue co-wrote every song on the album, which features lyrics about failed relationships, death, escapism, family, ageism, and freedom. Music critics praised Minogue's vulnerability and honesty, as well as her songwriting abilities, but they were divided on the composition and overall production standards. Commercially, the album was a success, reaching number one in Australia, Scotland, and the United Kingdom, and earning certification in the latter. The album also made the top ten in Germany, Belgium, Switzerland, Austria, the Czech Republic, Spain, and Hungary.

Golden produced six singles, including "Dancing", "Stop Me from Falling", "Golden", "A Lifetime to Repair", "Music's Too Sad Without You", and "Sincerely Yours". Minogue appeared at a number of live shows and events to promote the album, primarily in the United Kingdom, Australia, and the United States. Minogue also embarked on two concert tours, the first was Kylie Presents Golden, a promotional tour of Europe and the United States that preceded the album's release in March 2018, and her Golden Tour, which traveled throughout Europe and Australia. The critically and commercially successful tour was followed by a live audio and video release on 6 December 2019.

== Background and production ==
Between 2014 and 2017, Minogue continued to appear as a featured artist in the works of Giorgio Moroder and Fernando Garibay, eventually branching out into film and television. In 2016, Minogue released Kylie Christmas: Snow Queen Edition, a repackaged version of her previous year's studio album and her final Parlophone release. Minogue signed a deal with BMG Rights Management in February 2017 to release new music while keeping ownership of all of her material. Minogue and BMG agreed in December to release her new album in Australia and New Zealand through Mushroom Music Labels' subsidiary Liberator Music.

Throughout 2017, Minogue worked on new songs with Amy Wadge, Sky Adams, DJ Fresh, Nathan Chapman, Richard "Biff" Stannard, The Invisible Men, and Karen Poole. Initial sessions began in London and Los Angeles, with Minogue describing the material as "synth-pop dance songs" that her fans would "expect from her". However, Minogue's A&R manager Jamie Nelson suggested that she try country music, to which she agreed. In July 2017, she spent two weeks in Nashville recording four songs, and she described how "it all started to make sense. We were able to take inspiration from this country and incorporate it back into my life."

She described the result as "Dolly Parton standing on a dance floor" and added, "I did a lot of work on the album before that, but Nashville had a profound effect on me." Minogue co-wrote every song on Golden, which marks her first time doing so since 1997's Impossible Princess. Minogue "kept writing songs" without intending to, and the results were very "cathartic"; additionally, the singer believed the song's lyrics came across as more "authentic" and "story-telling" than her previous work. In Nashville, she described her songwriting process as "therapy".

== Composition and content ==
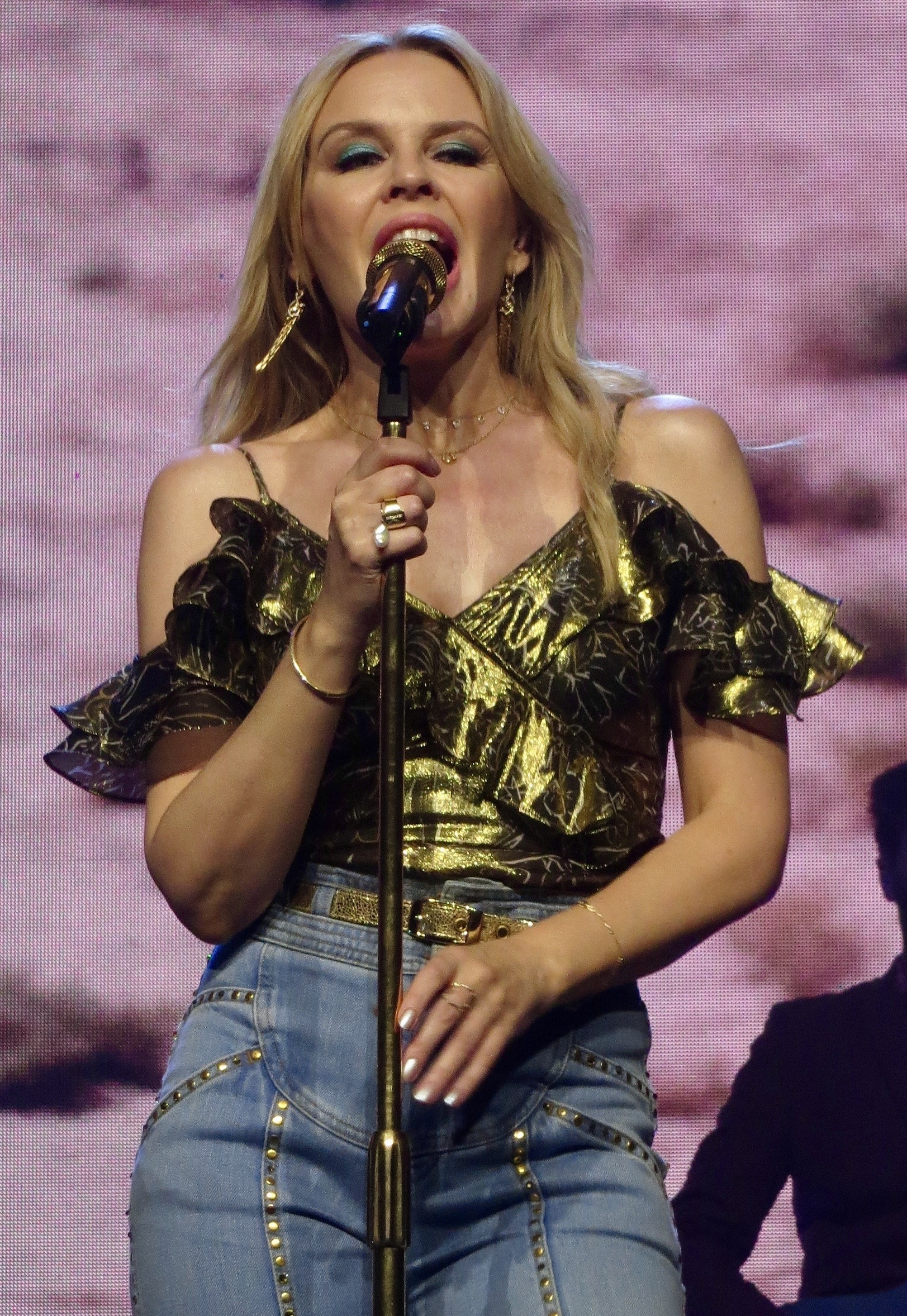
Minogue performing Golden songs "Shelby 68'" and "Radio On" on her Golden Tour

Golden marks Minogue's musical departure from traditional dance-pop music and towards country-infused pop and dance music. Regarding the album's sound, Laure Snapes of The Guardian stated "Kylie opts not for copper-bottomed songcraft, but the unholy intersection of country and EDM: drops beget scratchy fiddle breakdowns, while banjo clucks meet tropical house in a mush of mild euphoria." Ben Cardaw from Pitchfork wrote that “She borrows from the sledgehammer-subtle EDM Americana of Avicii's "Wake Me Up," where fingerpicked guitars meet thundering bass drums and teeth-rotting synths in the year of our lord 2013." Additionally, Slant Magazine editor Sal Cinquemani said that "While country signifiers abound, from foot-stomping to fiddling, the songs on Golden also smartly juxtapose contemporary pop elements like soaring synth hooks and pitched-up vocals."

The album opens with the lead single "Dancing", a country-dance-pop hybrid that lacks a bridge section and is lyrically about Minogue's perspective on death, with the lyrics "When I go out, I wanna go out dancing", describing how the singer wishes to feel in that situation before death. "Stop Me from Falling" has a similar country-dance sound, with handclaps, "toe-tappin'" basslines, and banjo riffs. "Golden" is a self-empowerment anthem that appears on soundtracks for Spaghetti Western films, specifically referencing Ennio Morricone's The Good, the Bad, and the Ugly theme song with the yodelling. Lyrically, "A Lifetime to Repair" delves into failed relationships and contrasts "lolling" country guitars with "drawling" vocals and "glittery" pop music.

"Sincerely Yours" is a pop ballad that serves as a "love letter" to her fans, sounding similar to the work of Canadian duo Tegan & Sara. "One Last Kiss" is a "basic" country song featuring live guitar riffs, drums, and banjo instrumentation. "Live a Little" has a similar dance-country sound to the album's opener "Dancing", and the lyrics "slept by candlelight, scared of running out of time" describe her age expectations and desire to be free and have fun. "Shelby 68'" has been compared to American singer Taylor Swift's work for its "ill-fitting Tennessee twang" and midtempo rhythm, and the title is a reference to her father's mustang and the year Minogue was born, as well as audio from the vehicle recorded by Minogue's brother Brendan.

"Radio On" is another ballad with a stripped-down production of acoustic guitars and violins, featuring "thin" vocals and the singer's willingness to forget a previous breakup by "listening to the radio". The lyric "lying in your lover's T-shirt" in "Love" refers to previous breakups as well as the aforementioned theme. "Raining Glitter" combines lilting acoustic guitar, disco beats, [and] a whooping vocal effect" that was compared to the Spiritual Life / Ibadan remix of Beth Orton's "Central Reservation". The standard edition album closer, "Music's Too Sad Without You", was written in collaboration with English-Italian musician Jack Savoretti and has been compared to American artists Beck and Lana Del Rey.

== Release and formats ==
Golden was released in a variety of formats on Minogue's website on 6 April 2018. It is her fourteenth studio release, and the first from BMG Rights Management and Minogue's company Darenote. The standard album contains 12 tracks totalling more than 40 minutes in length, while the deluxe edition includes four additional songs: "Lost Without You", "Every Little Part of Me", "Rollin'", and "Low Blow". Pre-release versions included a signed autograph. Both the standard and deluxe editions include slipcases, digipacks, and a mediabook.

There were also five vinyl variants available: a standard black vinyl, a clear vinyl with gatefold packaging, a picture disc, a limited white test pressing of the album, and a coffee-table book with 30 large gloss pages containing both the vinyl and standard disc. With the exception of the picture disc and white test pressing versions, each vinyl included a digital copy of the album. Four cassette tapes were also released: a black tape, a gold tape, a collectors tape featuring a special message from Minogue, and a Christmas-themed collectors tape. The latter two cassette versions were created so that Shazam users could access exclusive content. Golden was also available in digital and streaming formats, including the standard and deluxe edition.

Leif Podhajsky, an Australian art director and graphic designer, developed the creative direction and design for Golden, while British photographer Simon Emmett took the photographs. In a lengthy article about the artwork, Idolator's Mike Wass wrote, "She casually poses on a sofa with tousled hair and minimal make-up. There's even a (sequined) guitar next to her, not an instrument you would normally associate with the Queen of dance/pop."

== Promotion ==
=== Singles and other songs ===
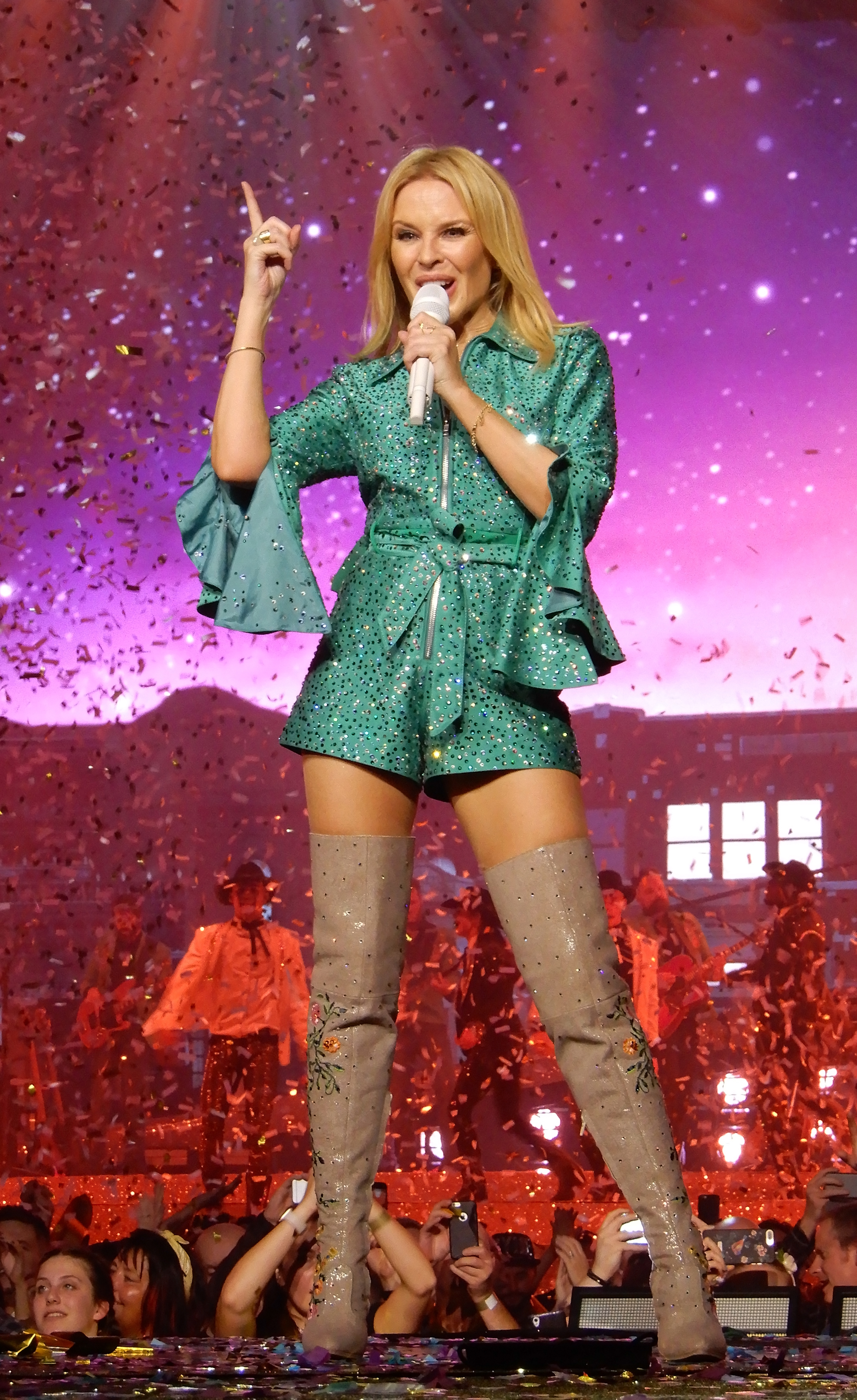
Minogue performing lead single "Dancing" on the Golden Tour

Golden released six singles. Minogue released "Dancing" as the album's lead single on 19 January 2018, marking her first collaboration with BMG Rights Management. The single's formats included B-side and bonus track "Rollin'" and additional remixes. The single debuted on Minogue's YouTube channel and received widespread praise from music critics for its music and production, with many hailing it as one of her best singles. Commercially, "Dancing" performed well, reaching the top forty in both Australia and the United Kingdom and earning certifications in both countries. It also charted in Belgium, France, Hungary, New Zealand, and Spain, and became her 14th number-one single on the US Billboard Dance Club Songs chart.

"Stop Me from Falling" was released as the second single on 9 March 2018, with digital formats including various remixes; the single version featured Cuban music duo Gente de Zona and Spanish lyrics sung by both the duo and Kylie Minogue. It received favourable feedback for its production quality and catchiness. Commercially, it performed moderately, reaching the top sixty of the United Kingdom and other component charts in Australia, France, and Japan. Minogue and Gente de Zona appear in the track's music video, which was shot in Havana, Cuba.

"Raining Glitter" was the album's only promotional single, reaching number 188 on the French Digital Singles Chart and 98 on the Scottish Singles Chart. On 28 May 2018, "Golden" was released as the album's third single, featuring remixes by Weiss. Critics praised the song's sound and Minogue's vocals, but it peaked at number 43 on Belgium's Ultratip Bubbling Under chart. Minogue's 50th birthday prompted the release of a music video on YouTube, which was also shot in Havana. "A Lifetime to Repair" was the album's fourth single, released on radio on 4 August and digitally on 17 August 2018. The album's fifth single, "Music's Too Sad Without You", a duet with Jack Savoretti, debuted on 9 October 2018, along with a music video shot in Venice, Italy. On 9 November 2018 "Sincerely Yours" was released as the album's sixth and final single, and it received airplay in Australia and New Zealand.

=== Live appearances ===
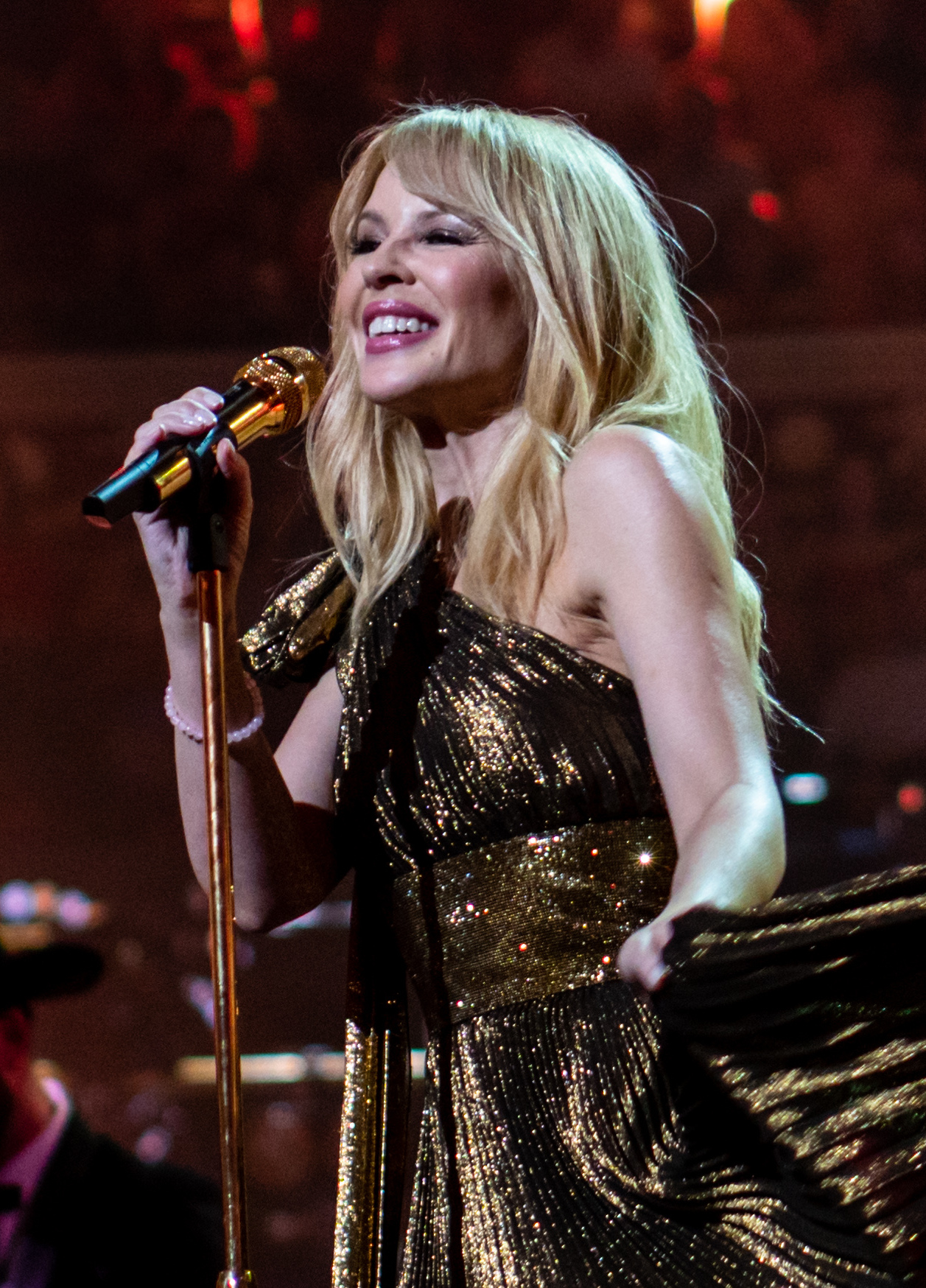
Minogue performing at the Royal Albert Hall for The Queen's Birthday Party, 2018

Minogue and BMG promoted Golden with a comprehensive marketing campaign prior to and during the album's release. Graham Norton interviewed her on BBC Radio 2 prior to her performance of "Dancing" on Saturday Night Takeaway on 24 February 2018. During her Kylie Presents Golden promotional tour, Minogue debuted several tracks from Golden at Café de Paris nightclub on 13 March. She performed "Dancing" and answered phone lines for Sports Relief the next day, as well as a special concert for Spotify fans at Porchester Hall on 22 March.

To promote the release of Golden, Minogue appeared on The Graham Norton Show and performed "Stop Me From Falling". The next day, she gave a free concert at London's G-A-Y nightclub. She appeared on ZDFmediathek in Germany on 10 April. On 12 April, Minogue appeared on BBC Breakfast, News Breakfast, Studio 10, Today, Sunrise, and Today Extra, and she performed "Dancing" at the Echo Awards. The following day, she returned to Let's Dance Germany to perform. Minogue returned to the United Kingdom to perform at The Queen's Birthday Party on 21 April 2018. On 25 April, she was interviewed by ET Canada, and on May 4, she performed on the Sounds Like Friday Night programme.

On 15 June, she performed "Islands in the Stream" on The Chris Evans Breakfast Show, followed by an interview on Good Morning Britain and performances on The Voice Kids UK on 19 July and 21 July, respectively. On 9 September, she headlined the BBC Radio 2 festival in Hyde Park, and on October 28, she performed "A Lifetime to Repair" on The X Factor UK. On 10 November, she performed "Music's Too Sad Without You" with Jack Savoretti on The Jonathan Ross Show, and fourteen days later, she appeared on Michael McIntyre's Big Show. Minogue promoted the album in the United States by performing and being interviewed on Late Night with Seth Meyers (25 April), BUILD Series (26 April), Good Morning America (27 April), White Party Palm Strings (29 April), The Late Late Show with James Corden (30 April), and the New York City LGBT Pride March (24 June).

=== Tours ===
Minogue used two concert tours to promote Golden. The first was her Kylie Presents Golden tour, which visited the United Kingdom, Spain, France, Germany, and New York City. A show in Sydney was originally planned, but it was cancelled for unknown reasons. Minogue stated that she planned to do more intimate shows before embarking on a full-scale tour. She had planned to extend the tour with additional shows, but she scrapped the idea and created a completely new show called the Golden Tour.

The Golden Tour includes 33 shows across Europe and Australia. According to Minogue, the shows would be divided into "two halves", with an intermission and a narrative running throughout. The set list featured a mix of Golden tracks and songs from Minogue's discography. Critics praised Minogue's star power, performance abilities, song selection throughout the show, and set design. The Golden tour was a commercial success, with three concerts in London, England at The O2 Arena grossing $3,368,900 and 30,100 tickets sold, placing her eighth among the biggest concerts in September 2018. Footage from the tour was also filmed across several nights, and was released on 6 December 2019 as Golden Live in Concert.

== Critical reception ==
Professional ratings
Aggregate scores
| Source | Rating |
|---|---|
| AnyDecentMusic? | 5.5/10 |
| Metacritic | 63/100 |
Review scores
| Source | Rating |
| AllMusic | 3.5/5 stars |
| The Daily Telegraph | 3/5 stars |
| Exclaim! | 6/10 |
| The Guardian | 3/5 stars |
| Herald Sun | 4/5 stars |
| The Independent | 3/5 stars |
| MusicOMH | 4/5 stars |
| NME | 3/5 stars |
| Pitchfork | 5.4/10 |
| Slant Magazine | 3.5/5 stars |

Golden received mixed to positive reviews from music critics. At Metacritic, which assigns a normalised rating out of 100 to reviews from mainstream critics, Golden has an average score of 63 based on 10 reviews, indicating "generally favorable" reception. Many critics praised Minogue's contribution to the creative process, particularly her songwriting. Mark Kennedy of the Associated Press observed that her songwriting abilities have become more reflective of her life; he says, "The lyrics fit a woman who turns 50 this year—regret, bad love, hope and yearning." Cameron Adams of News.com.au gave the album four stars, writing, "no one can say Golden is just your regular Kylie Minogue album." Nick Hasted of The Independent gave it three stars, saying it was better than her previous efforts because of its "authenticity", and naming "Shelby '68" and "Love" as two of the singer's most personal songs on the album.

Minogue's foray into country music received positive critiques. AllMusic's Tim Sendra called it "darn bold" for an artist of Minogue's longevity, saying, "The amazing thing about the album, and about Minogue, is that she pulls off the country as well as she's pulled off the new wave, disco, electro, murder ballads, and everything else she's done in her long career." Sal Cinquemani of Slant Magazine rated the album three and a half stars, praising Minogue's experimentation with country music and describing it as her most "personal effort since 1997's Impossible Princess". Minor criticism was directed at her "tinny and over-compressed" vocals on certain tracks, but it was eventually determined that "Golden further bolsters Minogue's reputation for taking risks—and artfully sets the stage for her inevitable disco comeback.”

MusicOMH editor Helen Clarke gave it four stars and praised the singer's songwriting and production abilities. She wrote, "Golden stands alongside her classic records; in a world of disposable music, Kylie's return is welcome and shows how slick, smart pop music should be done." In contrast, Ian Gormely of Exclaim! gave Golden a 6 out of 10 rating, writing that the album "is bereft of relative stinkers, but there's little to bring listeners back." Pitchfork editor Ben Cardew concurred, stating that Golden "sounds like someone playing at country music, rather than someone who understands it." He acknowledged Kylie's personality for driving the record, but concluded that he "hopes country Kylie is short-lived".

Larry Bartleet of NME felt that the best tracks occurred "when country serves as a delicate seasoning for Kylie's pop chops", citing "Dancing" and "Raining Glitter" as examples. In addition, Barleet believed the remaining work "strays perilously close to pastiche". In a negative review, Joe Muggs of The Arts Desk gave it two stars, claiming that the production and Kylie's songwriting were overshadowed by "bombast" musical styles. He went on to say that "Kylie very likely does have a great album (or albums) still in her, but imitating artists half her age really isn't the way to get to them."

== Commercial performance ==
Golden was a commercial success. In the United Kingdom, it debuted at number one on the UK Albums Chart with 48,032 album-equivalent units; 1,870 of those units were taken from sales-equivalent streams as reported by Music Week. The album became Minogue's sixth number one and her first since Aphrodite (2010). Golden outsold its closest competitor and previous week's number one, The Greatest Showman: Original Motion Picture Soundtrack, by 13,000 units according to the Official Charts Company. The album also debuted at number-one on the UK Vinyl Albums Chart with 6,400 records sold, becoming fastest selling vinyl album of 2018 in the region.

Furthermore, Golden became the year's fastest-selling cassette, outselling the best-selling artist album cassette of 2017 in its first week of release. Prior to the album's release, Adam Sherwin of I reported that all 4,000 limited edition Golden cassettes had sold out on pre-order, with Minogue's first week cassette sales in the UK totalling 2,600. Sherwin stated that the cassette format, once thought to be "obsolete", is experiencing a revival thanks to a new audience of "hipsters and music nostalgists" who value cassettes' "coffee table appeal". By September 2023, the album had sold 179,872 copies in the United Kingdom, and has been certified gold by the British Photographic Industry (BPI) for exceeding sales of 100,000 units.

Golden debuted at number one on the ARIA Albums Chart in her native Australia, with 8,745 sales, becoming her fifth studio album to reach the top and making Golden Minogue's first album to peak at number one in both the United Kingdom and Australia in 17 years, a feat she previously accomplished with Fever (2001). It then debuted at the top of the Australian Artist Albums Chart and the country's Digital Albums Chart. In New Zealand, it peaked at number 16 on the regional albums chart. In Japan, Golden debuted at number 14 on the daily Oricon Albums Chart, number 64 on the weekly chart with 1,052 physical sales, number 10 on the Western Albums Chart, and number 18 on the Digital Albums Chart, selling 586 digital units.

In Italy, the album debuted at number 14 on the Italian Albums Chart. In France, Golden debuted at number 33 in the national album charts, with 2,800 total sales in its first week. In Belgium, it debuted at number four and twelve on the albums charts for Flanders and Wallonia. In Scandinavia, Golden debuted at number 38 on the Swedish Albums Chart and 47 on the Finnish Albums Chart. In Germany, it debuted at number three on the albums chart, becoming her second highest-charting album after Aphrodite and trailing only 2001's Fever. In the Netherlands, the album debuted at number eighteen on the Dutch Album Top 100 and sixth on the vinyl chart. In the United States, Golden opened at number 64 on the Billboard 200, exceeding 10,000 album-equivalent units, of which 8,000 were from pure album sales. It also reached number 33 on Billboard's Canadian Albums Chart.

== Track listing ==
Standard edition
| No. | Title | Writer(s) | Producer(s) | Length |
|---|---|---|---|---|
| 1. | "Dancing" | Kylie Minogue; Nathan Chapman; Steve McEwan | Sky Adams | 2:58 |
| 2. | "Stop Me from Falling" | Minogue; Adams; McEwan; Danny Shah | Adams | 3:01 |
| 3. | "Golden" | Minogue; Lindsay Rimes; Liz Rose; McEwan | Rimes | 3:07 |
| 4. | "A Lifetime to Repair" | Minogue; Adams; Shah; Kiris Houston | Adams | 3:19 |
| 5. | "Sincerely Yours" | Minogue; Jesse Frasure; Amy Wadge | Frasure | 3:28 |
| 6. | "One Last Kiss" | Minogue; Ash Howes; Richard Stannard; Seton Daunt | Howes; Stannard | 3:41 |
| 7. | "Live a Little" | Minogue; Adams; Shah | Adams | 3:07 |
| 8. | "Shelby '68" | Minogue; Howes; Stannard; Daunt | Howes; Stannard; Daunt | 3:35 |
| 9. | "Radio On" | Minogue; Wadge; Jonathan Green | Jon Green | 3:42 |
| 10. | "Love" | Minogue; Adams; McEwan | Adams | 2:52 |
| 11. | "Raining Glitter" | Minogue; Alex Smith; Mark Taylor; Francis White | Smith; Taylor; White | 3:33 |
| 12. | "Music's Too Sad Without You" (with Jack Savoretti) | Minogue; Savoretti; Samuel Dixon | Dixon | 4:09 |
| Total length: | | | | 40:33 |

Deluxe edition
| No. | Title | Writer(s) | Producer(s) | Length |
|---|---|---|---|---|
| 13. | "Lost Without You" | Minogue; Green | Green; Charlie Russell | 4:04 |
| 14. | "Every Little Part of Me" | Minogue; Wadge; Adams | Adams | 2:58 |
| 15. | "Rollin'" | Minogue; Wadge; Adams | Adams | 3:32 |
| 16. | "Low Blow" | Minogue; Shah; Adams; McEwan | Adams | 2:56 |
| Total length: | | | | 54:03 |

Japanese bonus tracks
| No. | Title | Writer(s) | Producer(s) | Length |
|---|---|---|---|---|
| 13. | "Dancing" (Initial Talk Remix) | Minogue; Chapman; McEwan | Adams; Initial Talk^{[a]} | 3:45 |
| 14. | "Dancing" (Anton Powers Alternative Remix) | Minogue; Chapman; McEwan | Adams; Anton Powers^{[a]} | 5:06 |
| Total length: | | | | 49:31 |

Streaming edition
| No. | Title | Writer(s) | Producer(s) | Length |
|---|---|---|---|---|
| 17. | "Stop Me from Falling" (Remix featuring Gente de Zona) | Minogue; Adams; McEwan; Shah | Adams | 3:01 |
| Total length: | | | | 57:04 |

Christmas Collector's Edition cassette bonus track
| No. | Title | Writer(s) | Producer(s) | Length |
|---|---|---|---|---|
| 13. | "Music's Too Sad Without You" (single edit with Jack Savoretti) | Minogue; Savoretti; Dixon | Dixon | 3:26 |
| Total length: | | | | 43:59 |

== Personnel ==
Personnel details were sourced from the Golden liner notes booklet.

Performers and musicians

- Kylie Minogue – lead vocals, backing vocals
- Jack Savoretti – lead vocals (track 12)
- Sky Adams – backing vocals (tracks 2, 4, 7, 10), guitar (track 2), fiddle (track 4)
- Nathan Chapman – background vocals (track 1)
- Seton Daunt – guitar (track 6, 8), keyboards (track 6)
- Samuel Dixon – guitar (track 12), piano (track 12), bass guitar (track 12)
- Jesse Frasure – synthesizer (track 5), piano (track 5), drums (track 5), bass guitar (track 5)
- Jon Green – backing vocals (track 9), piano (track 9), acoustic guitar (track 9), electric guitar (track 9), bass (track 9), keyboards (track 9)
- Kiris Houston – guitar (track 4), banjo (track 4), fiddle (track 4), slide guitar (track 7)
- Ash Howes – keyboards (track 8)
- Steve McEwan – backing vocals (track 2), guitar (track 2), banjo (track 2), guitar (track 10), bass guitar (track 10)
- Tom Meadows – drums/percussion (track 9)
- Ron Minogue – recording of Shelby GT 350 (track 8)
- Emre Ramazanoglu – drums (track 12)
- Lindsay Rimes – backing vocals (track 3), guitar (track 3), keyboard (track 3)
- Davide Rossi – strings (track 9)
- Danny Shah – backing vocals (tracks 2, 4, 7, 10), guitar (tracks 4, 7)
- Alex Smith – backing vocals (track 11)
- Richard Stannard – keyboards (track 8)
- Michael Stockwell – guitar (tracks 1, 2, 7), bass guitar (track 2)
- Mark Taylor – backing vocals (track 11)
- Amy Wadge – backing vocals (tracks 5, 9)
- Eg White – backing vocals (track 11), synthesizer (track 11), bass guitar (track 11), acoustic guitar (track 11), autoharp (track 11)

Technical

- Sky Adams – mixing (tracks 1, 4), music production (tracks 1, 2, 4, 7, 10)
- Seton Daunt – additional guitar programming (track 6), additional programming (track 8), music co-production (track 8)
- Samuel Dixon – music production (track 12)
- Jesse Frasure – mixing (track 5), music production (track 5)
- Jon Green – engineering (track 9), music production (track 9)
- Ash Howes – mixing (track 6, 8), music production (track 6, 8)
- Savvas Iosifidis – mixing (tracks 4, 7)
- Guy Massey – mixing (track 10)
- Emre Ramazanoglu – mixing (track 12)
- Lindsay Rimes – mixing (track 3), music production (track 3)
- Davide Rossi – strings arrangement (track 9)
- Alex Smith – music production (track 11)
- Richard Stannard – mixing (track 6, 8), music co-production (track 6, 8)
- Mark Taylor – music production (track 11)
- Cenzo Townshend – mixing (track 2)
- Eg White – drum programming (track 11), mixing (track 11), music production (track 11)

Design

- Leif Podhajsky – creative direction, design
- Simon Emmett – photography

== Charts ==
=== Weekly charts ===
| Chart (2018) | Peak position |
|---|---|
| Australian Albums (ARIA) | 1 |
| Austrian Albums (Ö3 Austria) | 5 |
| Belgian Albums (Ultratop Flanders) | 4 |
| Belgian Albums (Ultratop Wallonia) | 12 |
| Canadian Albums (Billboard) | 33 |
| Czech Albums (ČNS IFPI) | 6 |
| Danish Vinyl Albums (Hitlisten) | 17 |
| Dutch Albums (Album Top 100) | 18 |
| Finnish Albums (Suomen virallinen lista) | 47 |
| French Albums (SNEP) | 33 |
| German Albums (Offizielle Top 100) | 3 |
| Hungarian Albums (MAHASZ) | 10 |
| Irish Albums (IRMA) | 2 |
| Irish Independent Albums (IRMA) | 1 |
| Italian Albums (FIMI) | 14 |
| Japanese Hot Albums (Billboard) | 49 |
| Japanese Albums (Oricon) | 64 |
| Japanese International Albums (Oricon) | 10 |
| New Zealand Albums (RMNZ) | 16 |
| Polish Albums (ZPAV) | 23 |
| Scottish Albums (Official Charts) | 1 |
| Slovak Albums (ČNS IFPI) | 63 |
| Spanish Albums (PROMUSICAE) | 8 |
| Swedish Albums (Sverigetopplistan) | 38 |
| Swiss Albums (Schweizer Hitparade) | 4 |
| Swiss Albums (Les charts Romandy) | 9 |
| UK Albums (Official Charts) | 1 |
| UK Independent Albums (Official Charts) | 1 |
| US Billboard 200 | 64 |
| US Independent Albums (Billboard) | 4 |
| US Indie Store Album Sales (Billboard) | 12 |

=== Year-end charts ===
| Chart (2018) | Position |
|---|---|
| Australian Albums (ARIA) | 71 |
| Australian Artist Albums (ARIA) | 12 |
| Belgian Albums (Ultratop Flanders) | 192 |
| UK Albums (OCC) | 33 |

== Certifications ==
| Region | Certification | Certified units/sales |
|---|---|---|
| United Kingdom (BPI) | Gold | 167,761 |

== Release history ==
| Region | Date | Format(s) | Label | Ref. |
|---|---|---|---|---|
| Various | 6 April 2018 | CD; digital download; LP; cassette; streaming | Darenote; BMG | |
| Mexico | 20 April 2018 | CD | BMG; Warner | |
| Brazil | 26 April 2018 | CD | BMG; Warner | |
| Various | 9 November 2018 | Collector's Edition cassette | Darenote; BMG | |
| Various | 14 December 2018 | Christmas Collector's Edition cassette | Darenote; BMG | |

== See also ==
- List of number-one albums of 2018 (Australia)
- List of UK Albums Chart number ones of the 2010s
- List of UK Album Downloads Chart number ones of the 2010s
- List of Official Vinyl Albums Chart number ones
- List of number-one albums of 2018 (Australia)
- List of top 10 albums in 2018 (Australia)
- List of UK Independent Albums Chart number ones of 2018
- List of number-one digital albums of 2018 (Australia)
- List of Irish Independent Albums Chart number-one albums of 2018
- List of UK top-ten albums in 2018
