= Stop Me from Falling =

2018 single by Kylie Minogue

Single by Kylie Minogue

from the album Golden
- Released: 9 March 2018
- Recorded: 2017
- Studio: Phrased Differently (London, England)
- Genre: Pop; country pop
- Length: 3:01
- Label: Darenote; BMG
- Songwriters: Kylie Minogue; Sky Adams; Steve McEwan; Danny Shah
- Producer: Sky Adams

Kylie Minogue singles chronology
"Dancing" (2018)	"Stop Me from Falling" (2018)	"Golden" (2018)

Music videos
- "Stop Me from Falling" on YouTube; "Stop Me from Falling" (remix) on YouTube

Gente de Zona remix cover
- Remix version cover

"Stop Me from Falling" is a song by Australian singer Kylie Minogue. It was released on 9 March 2018 by Minogue's own company Darenote Limited and licensed to BMG Rights Management, as the second single from her fourteenth studio album Golden (2018). It was written by Minogue, Steve McEwan and Danny Shah, while production was handled by Sky Adams. Musically, "Stop Me from Falling" features a similar rhythmic structure to Minogue's previous dance-oriented songs, and includes elements of pop and country music. Lyrically, it talks about a person that is at the brink of falling in love.

"Stop Me from Falling" received favorable reviews from music critics, with many noticing its similarities to its predecessor "Dancing", and praising its production. Commercially, the track reached the top ten in Poland and Spain, but performed moderately in other international record charts it appeared on. An accompanying music video was shot while Minogue was on her Kylie Presents Golden tour, featuring behind-the-scenes footage of the shows. The video premiered as an Apple Music exclusive, and was made available on 30 March.

To promote the single, Minogue performed the song on The Graham Norton Show and The One Show on BBC, and was also added on her Kylie Presents Golden set-list. It was also used as one of the opening tracks to her appearance on Radio 2 Live in Hyde Park, where she was the headliner of the show. In April 2018, "Stop Me from Falling" was remixed into a collaboration with Cuban musical duo Gente de Zona, and premiered on 20 April 2018 for digital consumption. A second music video was shot in Havana, Cuba, and was released on that same day. Commercially, this version appeared in record charts in Poland and Ecuador.

== Background and composition ==
In January 2018, Minogue released her single "Dancing", the first offering from her fourteenth studio album Golden (2018). Two months later, the singer announced the release of "Stop Me from Falling" a day prior to its release. Additionally, she revealed the song's premiere on BBC Radio 2. Shot with an ultraviolet filter, the accompanying artwork sees Minogue posing in a lace top. "Stop Me from Falling" was one of the tracks written and recorded in Nashville, Tennessee, where she felt the location had a profound effect on her and the parent album. It was written by Minogue, Steve McEwan, Danny Shah, and its producer Sky Adams. According to the singer, she identified it as one of her favorite songs from the album.

"Stop Me from Falling" runs for three minutes and two seconds, and features instrumentation of acoustic guitars, world beats, strings and an electric guitar. Musically, "Stop Me from Falling" is a pop song with elements of country music, and a rhythmic structure similar to Minogue's previous dance songs. Sarah Murphy from Exclaim! believed it fulfilled Minogue's experimentation with country music in Nashville, calling it "a twangy, country-pop tune that will still get your feet moving — just maybe in a line-dance pattern." Publications, such as Idolator and Spin, compared the track's sound and production to Minogue's predecessor single "Dancing". Writing for Spin, Anna Gaca noted the similarities, and stated that "you'll have no problem imagining these two living on the same record." Lyrically, the song was described by Mushroom Records as a "romantic" anthem that talks about being on the brink of love.

For the remix version with Cuban musical duo Gente de Zona, Minogue sings in both English and Spanish. Additionally, Minogue explained, "I love the new melody and energy Gente De Zona brought to 'Stop Me From Falling' and it was great to meet and work with them in Havana, Cuba."

== Release ==
"Stop Me from Falling" was released on 9 March 2018 by Minogue's company Darenote, as the second single from her fourteenth studio album Golden (2018). It was sent to radio formats that same day, and premiered on BBC Radio 2, which featured Minogue as a special guest with Chris Evans. Additionally, the Gente de Zona remix premiered a month later on 20 April 2018 as a digital download and two months later, a remix package was distributed for digital consumption on iTunes, featuring radio mixes by Joe Stone, Cerrone, and PBR Streetgang. The cover art of the original version was a promotional shot of Minogue during the Golden photoshoot, whereas the Gente de Zona version featured Minogue in a red dress that was featured in the music video.

== Critical reception ==
"Stop Me from Falling" received favorable reviews from music critics. Anna Gaca of Spin regarded the song as "a playful, effortless-feeling extension of the radiant country-pop Minogue introduced on lead single 'Dancing'". Lake Schatz of Consequence of Sound deemed the song "a fun and contagious country pop cut that'll have you slapping your knee", describing it as "Miley Cyrus going country (again), except Down Under". Writing for Idolator, Mike Wass opined that the song is "every bit as cute and catchy as 'Dancing'", complimenting Minogue's ability to "stay true to the country-pop format". Sarah Murphy of Exclaim! called it "a twangy, country-pop tune" that motivates people to dance. Robin Murray of Clash noticed the song's "Southern twang amid Kylie's effervescent delivery". Official Charts Company's Jack White also noted the song of being "in-keeping with the country styling of Dancing". Daniel Megarry from Gay Times thought that while it lingered with Kylie's similar sound on "Dancing", it "still retained the catchiness and charm that we love from her."

Upon its release on Golden, Tim Sendra from AllMusic chose it as a standout track, and praised Minogue's ability to pull of both contemporary pop and country music. Similarly, a second editor at Exclaim! magazine, Ian Gormely, believed it was another great opener to the album and set the record's overall tone. However, Ben Cardaw from Pitchfork felt that Minogue was trying too hard with the country sound, and noted that her vocals and the instrumentation were flaws. Similarly, NME writer Larry Bartleet said that the song was close to a pastiche of the genre, noting its instrumentation as an example.

== Commercial performance ==
In Australia, "Stop Me from Falling" failed to make an impact on their ARIA Singles Chart, but made an appearance on the ARIA Digital Track chart, peaking at number 32. In the United Kingdom, it peaked at number 9 on their Indie Chart. After the album's release in early April 2018, the track opened at number 78 on their regional singles chart and later peaked at number 52 there. It also peaked at number 12 on the Scottish Singles Chart for a sole week. In Croatia, "Stop Me from Falling" peaked at number 96. In Spain, it peaked at number 9 on the Spanish Digital Songs chart.

The remix version with Gente de Zona debuted at number 42 in Ecuador, which it ultimately peaked. The remix also made an appearance on Poland's Dance Top 50 chart, reaching number 22.

== Music videos ==
The first accompanying music video for "Stop Me from Falling" was filmed in Café de la Danse, Paris, where Minogue was performing for her Kylie Presents Golden promotional tour. Directed by Colin Solal Cardo, the video contains footage of Minogue's live performance to the crowd, interspersed with scenes of her in the venue alone and dancing backstage. The video was first made available to stream exclusively on Apple Music on 29 March before being uploaded to Minogue's Vevo account.

A second video was shot in Havana to accompany the version with Cuban reggaeton duo Gente de Zona. The video was directed by Sophie Muller, who shot Minogue's previous single, "Dancing". The music video was originally speculated back in February 2018 where the singer was spotted in different locations in Havana, though it remained unconfirmed by publications. She announced the news on her Instagram a day before its premiere, and revealing a new single artwork. The video opens with Minogue and her date in a cafe, until hearing another man play an electric guitar. Infatuated, she becomes interested in the man, and features the two new lovers on a beach front. A waiter approaches the couple, with Minogue leaving her lover for him. As the chorus starts, it features her and a group of on-goers dancing in the middle of the streets of Havana to the song. Gente de Zona make an appearance from a rooftop, waving at Kylie as she starts hanging with another man. The second pre-chorus has Minogue dancing around a fountain, surrounded by dancers in colorful outfits. The second and third choruses have Minogue dancing with the on-goers and Gente de Zona in a bar, with confetti shot in the air; the video finishes with the singer jumping into the on-goers catching her.

An editor at Idolator believed it to be her best music video since 2010's "All the Lovers", which they described as an "untouchable video" due to its "less-is-more" approach. They also explained the synopsis, and said that "What comes next is an explosion of looks, choreography and pure, unadulterated fun." Justin Myers from the Official Charts Company praised the remix, and said ""Stop Me From Falling" is a summer banger and the joyous video makes us want to go on holiday and dance on tables." AXS writer Lucas Villa stated "In a red hot dress, she becomes the dancing woman emoji and tears it up with the colorfully-dressed locals."

== Live performances ==
"Stop Me from Falling" was first performed live during the Kylie Presents Golden concerts in March 2018. Minogue performed the song on The Graham Norton Show on 6 April 2018, and on The One Show on 9 April 2018. On 21 April 2018, she performed the song at the Royal Albert Hall, during a concert celebrating the 92nd birthday of Queen Elizabeth II. On 27 April 2018, Minogue performed the song on Good Morning America. On 4 May 2018, she performed the song on Sounds Like Friday Night.

== Track listing ==
- Digital download
1. "Stop Me from Falling" – 3:01
- Digital download – Featuring Gente de Zona
1. "Stop Me from Falling" (Featuring Gente de Zona) – 3:00
- Digital EP
1. "Stop Me from Falling" (Joe Stone Remix) − 2:42
2. "Stop Me from Falling" (Cerrone Remix) − 3:45
3. "Stop Me from Falling" (PBR Streetgang Remix) − 3:43
4. "Stop Me from Falling" – 3:01

== Credits and personnel ==
Credits adapted from Tidal and ASCAP.

- Kylie Minogue – composition
- Sky Adams – composition, production, background vocals, guitar, record engineering
- Steve McEwan – composition
- Danny Shah – composition
- Cenzo Townshend – mix engineering
- Dick Beetham – master engineering
- Michael Stockwell – bass guitar, guitar
- Danny Shah – background vocals
- Steve McEwan – background vocals, banjo, guitar

== Charts ==
Chart (2018)	Peak position
Australia Digital Tracks (ARIA)	32
Australian Independent Singles (AIR)	2
Belgium (Ultratip Bubbling Under Flanders)	26
Bolivia (Monitor Latino)	17
Croatia (HRT)	96
Ecuador (National-Report) Remix featuring Gente de Zona	42
Hungary (Single Top 40)	34
Poland (Polish Airplay Top 100)	7
Poland (Dance Top 50) Remix featuring Gente de Zona	22
Scotland Singles (OCC)	12
Spain Physical/Digital Songs (PROMUSICAE)	9
UK Singles (OCC)	52
UK Indie (OCC)	9

== Release history ==
Region	Date	Format	Version	Label	Ref.
Various	9 March 2018	Digital download; streaming	Original	Darenote; BMG	
United Kingdom	9 March 2018	Contemporary hit radio	Original	BMG	
Italy	4 April 2018	Contemporary hit radio	Original	BMG	
Various	20 April 2018	Digital download; streaming	Remix (Featuring Gente de Zona)	Darenote; BMG	
Italy	20 April 2018	Contemporary hit radio	Remix (Featuring Gente de Zona)	BMG	
Various	22 May 2018	Digital download; streaming; (Remix EP)	Original	Darenote; BMG	
