= Dancing (Kylie Minogue song) =

2018 single by Kylie Minogue

Single by Kylie Minogue

from the album Golden
- B-side: "Rollin'"
- Released: 19 January 2018
- Recorded: 2017
- Studio: Phrased Differently (London, England)
- Genre: Electropop; dance-pop; country pop
- Length: 2:58
- Label: Darenote; BMG
- Songwriters: Kylie Minogue; Steve McEwan; Nathan Chapman
- Producer: Sky Adams

Kylie Minogue singles chronology
"Wonderful Christmastime" (2016)	"Dancing" (2018)	"Stop Me from Falling" (2018)

Music video
- "Dancing" on YouTube

"Dancing" is a song by Australian singer Kylie Minogue. It was released on 19 January 2018 by Darenote and BMG, as the lead single from her fourteenth studio album Golden (2018). Written by Minogue, Steve McEwan and Nathan Chapman, and produced by Sky Adams, "Dancing" was the singer's first material with BMG and Liberator, after finishing her contract with British label Parlophone two years prior. Musically, "Dancing" is a departure from her usual electronic dance sound, and adapts to country pop with elements of electronica and dance-pop. Lyrically, it talks about having fun and enjoying life while you can, with death and time being incorporated into the song's themes.

"Dancing" received positive reviews from music critics, many whom praised the song's production and lyrical quality. Upon its release on the parent album, certain critics had chosen it as a highlight. Commercially, the track reached the top twenty in regions such as Spain, Scotland, Hungary and Poland. It became the singer's 51st top-forty entry on the UK Singles Chart, and her 14th number-one hit on the US Dance Club Songs chart. Additionally, despite staying one week in the Top 50 in her native Australia, "Dancing" was certified gold by the Australian Recording Industry Association and silver by the British Phonographic Industry, denoting sales exceeding 35,000 and 200,000 units respectively.

Directed by Sophie Muller, the music video features Minogue dancing and singing in several backdrops that were inspired by the Country and Western culture, such as the work of Dolly Parton, and used motifs and imagery revolving around death. To promote the single, Minogue performed the song on her Kylie Presents Golden tour, and at several gigs and shows including Ant & Dec's Saturday Night Takeaway, Sport Relief, the Echo Music Prize in Germany, and when she headlined Radio 2 Live in Hyde Park.

== Background and composition ==
In 2016, Minogue released her final studio album with long-term record label Parlophone, entitled Kylie Christmas: Snow Queen Edition. After her departure from the label, Minogue signed a new record deal with BMG Rights Management which will release her upcoming album internationally. In December 2017, Minogue and BMG had struck a joint-deal with Mushroom Music Labels — under the sub-division label Liberator Music to release her new album in Australia and New Zealand. Throughout that year, Minogue worked with writers and producers for her fourteenth studio album including Amy Wadge, Sky Adams, DJ Fresh, Nathan Chapman, and teamed with previous collaborators Richard Stannard, The Invisible Men and Karen Poole. "Dancing" was one of the tracks written and recorded in Nashville, Tennessee, where she felt the location had a "profound" effect on her. It was co-written by Minogue alongside McEwan and Chapman, with production being handled by Adams. Minogue used Instagram to discuss the story of the single, saying that the track is about removing "hurdles" in life by "dancing and having a good time".

"Dancing" runs for two minutes and 58 seconds. Music critics have described the track as "country/electropop". Mark Lindores of Classic Pop compared its structure to "Burning Up" from Minogue's 2002 album Fever. Writing for Rolling Stone, Daniel Kreps noted that Minogue's work in Nashville was "evident" to the single, exemplifying its "acoustic guitar fingerpicking and Minogue brandishing some twang" at the opening of the song. Similarly, Nick Reilly from NME noticed Minogue's "unlikely foray" to Country music, but complimented the track's progression to the "huge pop chorus". Noisey's editor Lauren O'Neill found elements of electronic music in the song. Additionally, she compared the track's sound to the innovations of electronic dance music today—alongside Minogue's previous experimentations—and felt Minogue's offering was "more successful" than other "popstars". A contributor at Spin described it as a "top 40 version of Young Thug's country rap experiment 'You Said'", though they noted its more of a "rootsy dance" hybrid. Minogue commented about the track's production and entire form in an interview with Herald Sun in Australia;

"You've got the lyrical edge, that country feel, mixed with some sampling of the voice and electronic elements, so it does what it says on the label. And I love that it's called 'Dancing', it's immediately accessible and seemingly so obvious, but there's depth within the song".

== Release ==
"Dancing" was released on 19 January 2018 by BMG and Liberator Music, as the lead single from her fourteenth studio album Golden (2018). It also served as the singer's first material with BMG and Liberator, after finishing her contract with British label Parlophone two years prior. A 7" vinyl was included in various package bundles on the singers website, promoting the release of the parent album; this included the B-side track "Rollin'", which appeared as a bonus track on deluxe editions of the album. A limited edition CD single were distributed in Australia and New Zealand for the annual Mardi Gras Fair Day, which included the standard version of the album and a T-shirt.

Throughout February and March 2018, Minogue's company Darenote distributed digital remixes of "Dancing", featuring the work of Initial Talk, Illyus & Barrientos, Anton Powers and Dimmi; Powers' version including both a radio and extended edit. Additionally, Minogue re-packaged the single releases of the first three artists into one format, and released it on her website. Dimmi's remix only premiered in France via iTunes. The cover art were re-colored versions of the standard picture, which was a promotional shot of Minogue during the Golden photoshoot.

== Critical reception ==
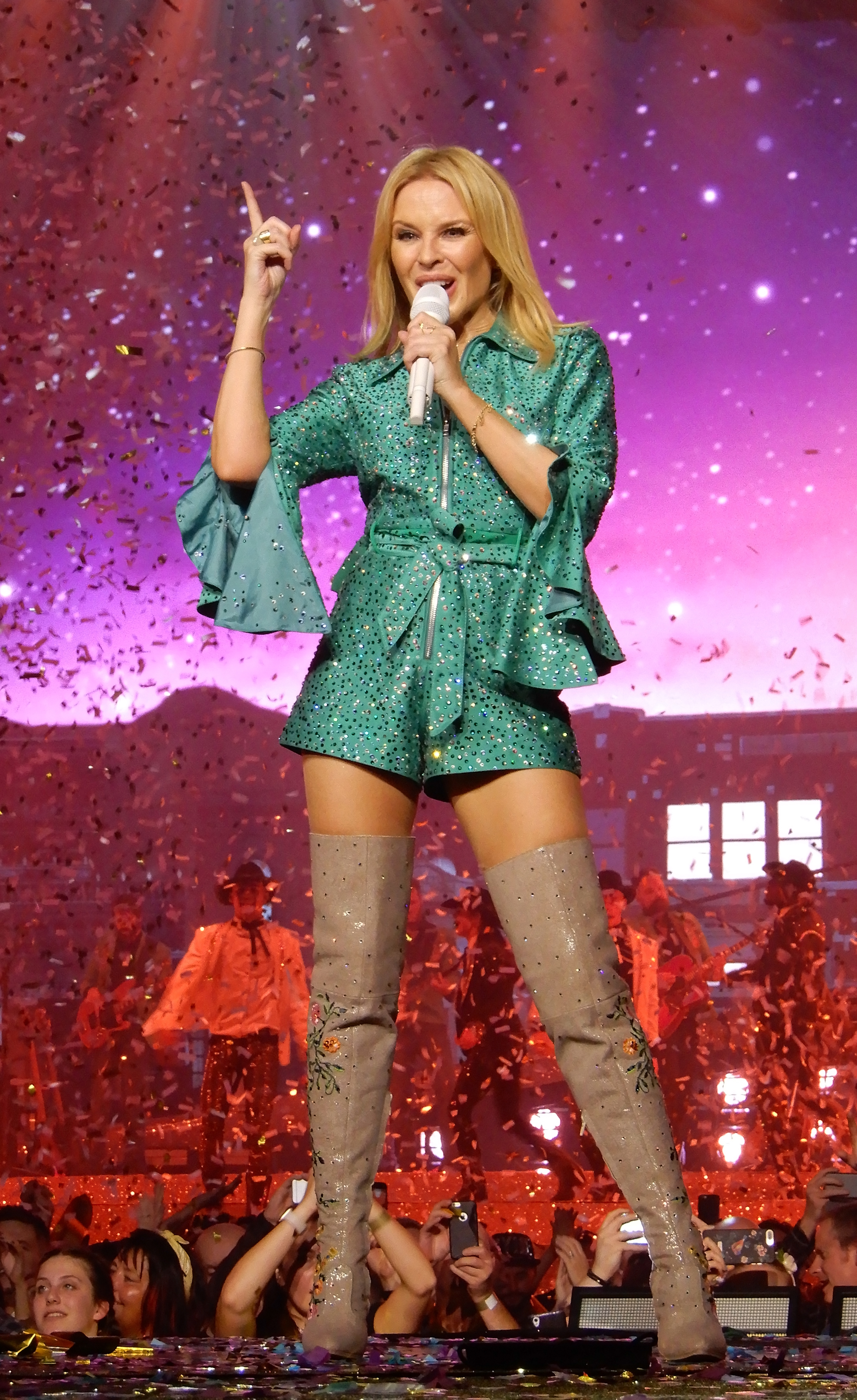
Minogue performing "Dancing" as the final number of the Golden Tour

"Dancing" received positive reviews from music critics. Joey Nolfi from Entertainment Weekly called it a "welcome return to form for the singer-songwriter", and believed it to be her most "refreshing" offering since her work on Impossible Princess (1997). Sam Damshenas at Gay Times agreed, calling it a "country-pop banger" that may "becom[e] a future Kylie classic". Matt Bagwell, writing for The Huffington Post, wrote an article defining 10 moments of Kylie's career where she "redefined pop music", and listed Golden and "Dancing" as one of them; he called it her most "surprising" material yet, and praised the songwriting for being more "in-depth". Daniel Kreps from Rolling Stone described it as "euphoric", whereas Idolator writer Mike Wass called it a "cute country-pop hybrid with an instantly hummable chorus." Hannah J. Davis from The Guardian listed it as their "Track of the Week", declaring it as "Raw yet danceable,". She compared it to "Dancing on My Own" by Swedish singer Robyn, believing it to be "one of those songs that's a total bop but which, after a couple of merlots, might push you into the foetal position."

Described a lot "mellower" than her previous music, Express.co.uk contributor Shaun Kitchener believed it was "still unmistakably Kylie" by its production, and believed its chorus would "satisfy her loyal fan base". Although Similarly, MuuMuse's Bradley Stern acknowledged that it wasn't what was "expected", but concluded that "Dancing" is a "perfectly fine first step into this bold new era, and an assurance that she's going to keep doing what she does best until the very last shimmy,". Cameron Adams from The Northern Star believed the track's sound would "divide" fans, but also compared its appeal to the work of Impossible Princess—which made a similar impact. Nevertheless, Adams said that "Dancing" is a "smart first single as it is one of the most traditional Kylie moments on Golden."

Upon the release of Golden, "Dancing" was selected as one of the album's highlights. Tim Sendra from AllMusic chose it as a standout track, and praised Minogue's ability to pull of both contemporary pop and country music. Ian Gormely from Exclaim! shared a similar opinion, stating that it "is a great addition to the Kylie singles arsenal of earworms,". Pitchfork editor Ben Cardew opined that tracks like "Dancing" stay true to Minogue's dance-pop style, and described it as "genuine brilliance." Moreover, he complimented the track's "funny one-liner chorus... that perfectly sums up the way a great pop song can defy mortality." Mark Kennedy at The Washington Post also commended her songwriting abilities, and described it as "Dolly Parton-ish".

== Commercial performance ==
"Dancing" made its official charting debut in New Zealand, opening at number seven on their regional Heatseeker Singles Chart. This became the singer's first single to chart in the region since 2012's "Timebomb", which reached number 33 on the country's top 40 chart. In Minogue's native Australia, the song opening at number 46, tying with "Into the Blue" as her lowest-charting lead single in the country. Furthermore, it also reached number eight on the region's dance chart. Despite the single's low charting, "Dancing" received a gold certification denoting shipments of 35,000 units. In the United Kingdom, "Dancing" opened at number 47 on the UK Singles Chart before dropping off the chart the following week. Once the video was released it re-entered at number 93 before leaving again for two weeks. After her performance of the song on live television, the song re-entered at number 50, staying in the chart for another week after at number 61. It later peaked at number 38 after the release of Golden, becoming her fifty-first top 40 hit. Moreover, it debuted at number five on the UK Indie Chart, number one on the Vinyl Singles chart, number 15 on the Official Singles Sales Chart and peaked at number 10 on the Scottish Singles Chart.

In Belgium, it entered the Wallonia Ultratip chart at number 46, and peaked at number 14 five weeks later. Additionally, it charted on the Flanders Ultratip chart at number 44, its final peak. It also reached number five on the Digital Songs Chart in both Finland and Sweden, provided by Billboard. Due to live promotion of the single in Germany, it managed to enter their singles chart at number 98, Minogue's first appearance on the chart since "Into the Blue". The song later peaked at number 71. Additionally, "Dancing" made appearances on several radio charts throughout Europe, including in Hungary at number 17, and at number 19 in Poland. In the United States, the single made its debut on the Dance Club Songs at number 53. After 11 weeks, it rose to number one, becoming the singer's 14th song to top that chart.

== Music video ==
Minogue uploaded the official audio of "Dancing" on her YouTube channel on the same date of its release. The audio-only video features the single's artwork, consisting of her wearing a cowgirl outfit and leaning back while sitting in front of a stage.

The video for "Dancing" premiered on 1 February, following a backstage teaser confirming the date. Directed by Sophie Muller, the country-inspired video was an homage to singers such as Dolly Parton as well as a return to Minogue's earlier choreography based videos. Minogue told Rolling Stone, "I always thought I could learn routines quickly, but this was different," she said. "However, by the time I had to dance with the Grim Reaper at the end I had mastered it. And if that's not a funny allegory for life I don't know what is!"

== Live performances ==
Minogue performed "Dancing" for the first time on Ant & Dec's Saturday Night Takeaway on 24 February 2018. The song was included on the setlist of Kylie Presents Golden concerts in March 2018. On 23 March, Minogue performed the song on Sport Relief. On 12 April 2018, Minogue performed the song live during the German Echo Music Prize. Minogue performed "Dancing" on the 25 April 2018 episode of Late Night with Seth Meyers; this was the song's debut performance for American television. Two days later, she performed the song on Good Morning America. On 30 April 2018, Minogue performed the song on The Late Late Show with James Corden.

Minogue performed "Dancing" as part of her set headlining Radio 2 Live in Hyde Park. She also closed her Golden Tour with "Dancing", where she wore a teal playsuit paired with grey embroidered thigh high boots.

== Formats and track listings ==
- CD single & digital download
1. "Dancing" – 2:58
- 7" vinyl
1. "Dancing" – 2:58
2. "Rollin'" – 3:32
- Digital EP
1. "Dancing" – 2:59
2. "Dancing" (Anton Powers edit) – 3:04
3. "Dancing" (Illyus & Barrientos remix) – 5:41
4. "Dancing" (Initial Talk remix) – 3:44
- Digital download – Initial Talk remix
1. "Dancing" (Initial Talk remix) – 3:43
- Digital download – Illyus & Barrientos remix
1. "Dancing" (Illyus & Barrientos Remix) – 5:41
- Digital download – Anton Powers remix
1. "Dancing" (Anton Powers remix) – 5:06
2. "Dancing" (Anton Powers edit) – 3:04
- Digital download – DIMMI remix
1. "Dancing" (DIMMI Remix) – 3:02

== Charts ==
=== Weekly charts ===
Chart (2018)	Peak position
Australia (ARIA)	46
Australia Dance (ARIA)	8
Australian Independent Singles (AIR)	1
Belgium (Ultratip Bubbling Under Flanders)	44
Belgium (Ultratip Bubbling Under Wallonia)	14
Croatia (HRT)	30
Denmark Airplay (Tracklisten)	12
Ecuador (National-Report)	54
Finland Digital Songs (Billboard)	5
Germany (GfK)	71
Hungary (Single Top 40)	17
New Zealand Heatseekers (RMNZ)	7
Poland Airplay (ZPAV)	19
Scottish Singles Sales (Official Charts)	10
Slovakia Airplay (ČNS IFPI)	56
Spain Physical/Digital Songs (PROMUSICAE)	9
Sweden Digital Songs (Billboard)	5
UK Singles (Official Charts)	38
UK Indie (Official Charts)	5
US Dance Club Songs (Billboard)	1

=== Year-end charts ===
Chart (2018)	Position
US Hot Dance Club Songs (Billboard)	37

== Certifications ==
Region	Certification	Certified units/sales
Australia (ARIA)	Gold	35,000^{‡}
United Kingdom (BPI)	Silver	200,000
^{‡} Sales+streaming figures based on certification alone.

== Release history ==
Region	Date	Format	Label	Ref.
Various	19 January 2018	Digital download; streaming	Darenote; BMG	
Australia	19 January 2018	Contemporary hit radio	Liberator; BMG	
Italy	19 January 2018	Contemporary hit radio	BMG	
United Kingdom	19 January 2018	Contemporary hit radio	BMG	
Various	23 February 2018	Digital download; streaming; (Initial Talk remix)	Darenote; BMG	
Various	2 March 2018	Digital download; streaming; (Illyus & Barrientos remix)	Darenote; BMG	
Various	9 March 2018	Digital download; streaming; (Anton Powers remix)	Darenote; BMG	
Germany	6 April 2018	Vinyl	Darenote; BMG	
United States	6 April 2018	Vinyl	Darenote; BMG	

== See also ==
- List of number-one dance singles of 2018 (U.S.)
