= On a Night Like This... (tour) =

2001 concert tour by Kylie Minogue

- Tour by Kylie Minogue
- Promotional poster for the tour
- Location: Europe; Oceania
- Associated album: Light Years
- Start date: 3 March 2001
- End date: 15 May 2001
- Legs: 2
- No. of shows: 46
- Supporting acts: Dimestars; Chakradiva

Kylie Minogue concert chronology
- Intimate and Live (1998); On a Night Like This... (2001); KylieFever2002 (2002)

On a Night Like This... was the sixth concert tour by Australian recording artist Kylie Minogue, in support of her seventh studio album, Light Years (2000). The tour consisted of a European leg and Australian leg, beginning on 3 March 2001 at the Clyde Auditorium, in Glasgow, Scotland, and concluding back in Australia on 15 May 2001 at the Sydney Entertainment Centre.

After the success of her performances at the 2000 Sydney Olympics' closing ceremonies and during the opening ceremony of the Paralympics, days later, Minogue's team announced details of the planned tour. Tickets went on sale in November of 2000, with a demand that established her as one of the most popular live acts at the time. However, the tour began somewhat problematically, when opening night at the RDS Arena, Dublin, Ireland, on 1 March 2001, was cancelled due to air traffic control restrictions.

The setlist featured the majority of Light Years, with Minogue's top hits from her previous studio albums, including Kylie (1988), Enjoy Yourself (1989), Rhythm of Love (1990), Kylie Minogue (1994) and Impossible Princess (1997), making Let's Get to It (1991) the sole exclusion. The tour additionally marked the premiere of "Can't Get You Out of My Head" as Minogue was working on her upcoming album, Fever. The complete 19-track setlist was divided into five separate acts plus an encore.

To coincide with the success of the tour, Minogue reissued Light Years as a 2-CD set with bonus remixes on 5 March 2001. Meanwhile, the Australian releases included an Olivia Newton-John cover of "Physical", one of the exclusive performances to debut in On a Night Like This. The 11 May concert in Sydney was recorded and released commercially in DVD and VCD format, entitled Live in Sydney.

With both legs of the tour consisting of 23 shows, respectively, Minogue was among the most successful Australian touring artists. Reported from the Australian leg alone, the tour garnered over 200,000 ticket sales.

== Background and development ==
Having signed to Parlophone in June 1999, Minogue began to work on her next album, Light Years. The album marked her return to pop music, with elements deeply rooted from disco and Europop, which later became her signature sound in the new millennial. Light Years was a commercial success, achieving a quadruple platinum certification in her home country for having sold over 280,000 copies whereas in the UK it sold over 500,000 copies and earning itself a platinum certification. The album promotion spanned over four singles, including Spinning Around, On a Night Like This, Kids (as a duet with Robbie Williams), and Please Stay. Your Disco Needs You was also released in 2001, though remained exclusive to Australia and Germany. Minogue also made her appearances in many music shows and award ceremonies, two of which being the Dancing Queen performance at the Summer Olympics on 1 October 2000 (as a closing performer) and a 15-minute medley at the Summer Paralympics on 18 October 2000 (as a headliner). Light Years was regarded as a 'pivotal moment' to Minogue's career, as it was said to be her 'gaining back to stardom' after her indie years which is usually referred to her 'Indie Kylie' era.

Having successfully attracted a huge public recognition, Minogue seized the opportunity and announced to launch a new tour in March 2001. On 16 November 2000, on Minogue's website, it was announced that she was performing 6 shows in the UK in the first half of March 2001, which was soon extended to be a full month schedule, with European dates between the 23rd and 28th due to popular demand. On 5 and 13 December 2000, she continually announced the Australian dates in April and May 2001. According to Frontier Touring Company, Minogue's first two concerts in Sydney sold out within one hour after going on sale. It was estimated that 1750 tickets were sold every five minutes. Extra dates were kept being added until February 2001, one month before the actual show began. Ticket prices ranged from $20 in both regions.

Minogue was inspired by the style of Broadway shows such as 42nd Street and films such as Anchors Aweigh, South Pacific and the Fred Astaire and Ginger Rogers musicals of the 1930s. Describing Bette Midler as a "heroine", she also incorporated some of the "camp and burlesque" elements of Midler's live performances. The show directed and choreographed by Luca Tommassini featured elaborate backdrops, such as the deck of an ocean liner, an Art Deco New York City skyline, and the interior of a space ship. Minogue was praised for her new material and her reinterpretations of some of her greatest successes, turning "I Should Be So Lucky" into a torch song and "Better the Devil You Know" into a 1940s big band number.

Certain worn pieces including accessories from the show designed by Julien Macdonald, Pamela Blundell and Manolo Blahnik were collectively gifted to Arts Centre Melbourne by Minogue in 2004 and 2006. The last piece to be archived was the tour programme in 2009.

== Concert synopsis ==
The show began with a band overture, accompanied by an on-screen montage of Minogue's videography. In the middle of the stage hung a black drape tailored with Minogue's first two initials "KM", which later revealed the stage representing a cruise. After a short dance break, Minogue first appeared mid-air with a giant mirror ball anchor, introducing the first act Loveboat with the song with the same title. The silk floral robe was soon untied at the end of Loveboat to reveal Minogue in a glittery silver-and-pink striped sleeveless top paired with a mini skirt, the one that stayed on the other three songs of the first act: "Koocachoo", "Hand on Your Heart" and "Put Yourself in My Place".

The second act was followed by "On a Night Like This" in the theme of a shimmery 80s disco scene. Minogue appeared to be wearing a red leather biker jacket and red flared pants with flame detail on lower legs, whose jacket then turned into a black singlet starting as Minogue performed a medley of hits during her PWL era including "Step Back in Time", "Never Too Late", "Wouldn't Change a Thing", "Turn It Into Love" and "Celebration". Minogue took a moment to appreciate fans who came to the show before belting out "Can't Get You Out of My Head", which served as the first teaser of her next studio album Fever which was still in progress at the time. Minogue finally concluded the act with "Your Disco Needs You".

The drape was brought back to highlight Minogue in white tails and a top hat, sitting on a piano singing the torch version of "I Should Be So Lucky" as the opener for the Broadway section of the show. Reunited with the dancers for a 'big number', Minogue showcased a 1940s big band rearrangement of "Better the Devil You Know" and wrapped up the jazz atmosphere with a breakup track from Light Years "So Now Goodbye".

Within the next act, it was meant to show the diversity of clubbing. Starting with intimacy, the lights were dimmed to represent the night at a strip club. Minogue, in a golden high slit dress, spiced up the setting by pole dancing to a slowed down sensual version to Olivia Newton-John's "Physical". Then came "Butterfly", depicting a rave at dance clubs, with Minogue then wearing a peach satin halterneck-styled bra topped with gold metal chains. "Confide in Me" served as an excerpt of an acoustic session, before going back to the energetic atmosphere with "Kids" and "Shocked", showing the socializing aspect while clubbing.

The fourth act’s setting was inspired by the interior design of a spaceship. Minogue entered through a doorway in the backdrop dressed in a space stewardess uniform, as were the dancers, welcoming everyone to KM air as a part of the lyrics in “Light Years”. The act was also referred to as the first encore, for Minogue performing “What Do I Have To Do?” while introducing the crew including the band, dancers as well as her two backing vocalists.

Minogue returned to the stage with “Spinning Around” for the final encore, where she wore a white diamante singlet with white denim hot pants, as well highlighted with a neckerchief.

== Reception ==
"I'm completely amazed at what a huge star Kylie is here in Australia. [...] She is also the nicest person to work for and not at all a 'star.' She knows everybody's name and asks how they are and that's quite rare with a performer of her caliber. She has been a complete and utter diamond to work for, the most easy-going person. She's also a great professional--at one of the Melbourne shows she was really ill but she still did the show and you wouldn't have known just how sick she was. The crew has also been fantastic and it has been a real family experience. Usually toward the end of a tour everyone is sick of each other but not on this one."

— Lighting designer Vince Foster, discussing Minogue's work ethic and collaboration with the crew in 2001.

The tour received favorable reviews from news critics, most of which focused on her image transformation, energy and her theatrical rearrangements of songs. Attending the Hammersmith Apollo, W6 show, Tom Horan from The Daily Telegraph praised Minogue for having "emanated an infectious warmth and goodwill" right from the beginning of the show. On 18 March 2001, Ian Youngs from BBC News Online highlighted that the tour showed Minogue's transition "from one of pop's sugar-sweet contenders to a real, raunchy superstar in her own right". Reporting from night 3 of her 4-day show at Manchester Apollo, Simon Godley from God Is in the TV wrote: "It (the show) was top-end camp glamour, highly decorative, wonderfully expressive, mildly erotic, and all handled with suitably understated sexual innuendo.". On the night of Bournemouth, Hilary Porter from Dorset Echo complimented the theatrical aspect of the performances as well as its atmosphere, saying: "From the moment the purple regal drapes embossed with her initials fell open mouthed at her dainty stilettoed feet. Fully grown men behaved like love-struck teenyboppers [...] and could be heard chanting “Kylie Kylie!”"

== Setlist ==
The following set list is obtained from the 11 May 2001 show in Sydney, Australia. It is not intended to represent all dates throughout the tour.

Act 1: Loveboat

1. "Loveboat"
2. "Koocachoo"
3. "Hand on Your Heart"
4. "Put Yourself in My Place"

Act 2: Revue

5. "On a Night Like This"
6. "Step Back in Time" / "Never Too Late" / "Wouldn't Change a Thing" / "Turn It into Love" / "Celebration"
7. "Can't Get You Out of My Head"
8. "Your Disco Needs You"

Act 3: Broadway Swing

9. "I Should Be So Lucky"
10. "Better the Devil You Know"
11. "So Now Goodbye"

Act 4: Club

12. "Physical"
13. "Butterfly"
14. "Confide in Me" / "Did It Again"
15. "Kids"
16. "Shocked"

Act 5: Space Odyssey

17. "Light Years"
18. "What Do I Have to Do"

Encore

19. "Spinning Around"
Notes
- The first night of the tour marked the premiere of "Can't Get Out You Out of My Head", as Minogue shared she was working on her upcoming album, Fever.
- "Physical" was not performed in Paris.
- "Did It Again" was performed on 14 and 17 April.

== Tour dates ==
List of 2001 concerts, showing date, city, country, venue and opening act
Date (2001)	City	Country	Venue	Opening act
3 March	Glasgow	United Kingdom	Clyde Auditorium	Dimestars
4 March	Glasgow	United Kingdom	Clyde Auditorium	Dimestars
5 March	Glasgow	United Kingdom	Clyde Auditorium	Dimestars
7 March	Manchester	United Kingdom	Manchester Apollo	Dimestars
8 March	Manchester	United Kingdom	Manchester Apollo	Dimestars
9 March	Manchester	United Kingdom	Manchester Apollo	Dimestars
10 March	Manchester	United Kingdom	Manchester Apollo	Dimestars
12 March	Brighton	United Kingdom	Brighton Centre	Dimestars
13 March	Brighton	United Kingdom	Brighton Centre	Dimestars
14 March	Cardiff	United Kingdom	Cardiff International Arena	Dimestars
15 March	Bournemouth	United Kingdom	Windsor Hall	Dimestars
17 March	London	United Kingdom	Hammersmith Apollo	Dimestars
18 March	London	United Kingdom	Hammersmith Apollo	Dimestars
19 March	London	United Kingdom	Hammersmith Apollo	Dimestars
20 March	London	United Kingdom	Hammersmith Apollo	Dimestars
23 March	Copenhagen	Denmark	Vega Musikkens Hus	—N/a
25 March	Berlin	Germany	Columbiahalle	—N/a
26 March	Hamburg	Germany	Große Freiheit 36	—N/a
27 March	Cologne	Germany	E-Werk	—N/a
28 March	Paris	France	Bataclan	—N/a
30 March	London	United Kingdom	Hammersmith Apollo	Dimestars
31 March	London	United Kingdom	Hammersmith Apollo	Dimestars
1 April	London	United Kingdom	Hammersmith Apollo	Dimestars
14 April	Brisbane	Australia	Brisbane Entertainment Centre	Chakradiva
16 April	Sydney	Australia	Sydney Entertainment Centre	Chakradiva
17 April	Sydney	Australia	Sydney Entertainment Centre	Chakradiva
18 April	Sydney	Australia	Sydney Entertainment Centre	Chakradiva
19 April	Sydney	Australia	Sydney Entertainment Centre	Chakradiva
21 April	Hobart	Australia	Derwent Entertainment Centre	Chakradiva
23 April	Melbourne	Australia	Rod Laver Arena	Chakradiva
24 April	Melbourne	Australia	Rod Laver Arena	Chakradiva
25 April	Adelaide	Australia	Adelaide Entertainment Centre	Chakradiva
26 April	Adelaide	Australia	Adelaide Entertainment Centre	Chakradiva
28 April	Perth	Australia	Perth Entertainment Centre	Chakradiva
30 April	Perth	Australia	Perth Entertainment Centre	Chakradiva
3 May	Melbourne	Australia	Rod Laver Arena	Chakradiva
5 May	Melbourne	Australia	Rod Laver Arena	Chakradiva
6 May	Melbourne	Australia	Rod Laver Arena	Chakradiva
7 May	Melbourne	Australia	Rod Laver Arena	Chakradiva
9 May	Sydney	Australia	Sydney Entertainment Centre	Chakradiva
10 May	Sydney	Australia	Sydney Entertainment Centre	Chakradiva
11 May	Sydney	Australia	Sydney Entertainment Centre	Chakradiva
12 May	Sydney	Australia	Sydney Entertainment Centre	Chakradiva
13 May	Sydney	Australia	Sydney Entertainment Centre	Chakradiva
14 May	Sydney	Australia	Sydney Entertainment Centre	Chakradiva
15 May	Sydney	Australia	Sydney Entertainment Centre	Chakradiva

== Cancelled shows ==
List of concerts, showing date, city, country, venue and reason for cancellation
Date	City	Country	Venue	Reason
1 March 2001	Dublin	Ireland	RDS Arena	Weather concerns

== Broadcasts and recordings ==
Minogue's performance in Sydney, Australia, on 11 May 2001 was filmed for DVD entitled, Live in Sydney. The DVD was released on 1 October 2001 in the UK and 15 October 2001 in Australia. A 2-VCD version was also released in other territories, such as South Korea, Thailand and Singapore.

The DVD features exclusive backstage footage of the concert, including a look into the dancers' dressing rooms and a prank played on Kylie during the show entitled 'Will Kylie Crack?'. The prank consists of stage personnel doing random things below the stage where Kylie can see them when she turns to look at the backdrop during "So Now Goodbye".

In 2004, Live in Sydney was reportedly certified triple platinum in Australia by Australian Recording Industry Association (ARIA), meaning it was sold for 45,000 copies across the country. As of 2013, the DVD accumulated 100,000 copies in the UK, which is equivalent to a double platinum record according to British Phonographic Industry (BPI). Notably, it peaked atop UK Music Videos chart at number 1 and remained stable on the chart for nearly two years.

== Personnel ==
Taken from Kylie: Live in Sydney credits and Kylie's website in 2006.

- Kylie Minogue – showgirl

Backing singers

- Lurine Cato
- Sherina White

Management and assistant

- Terry Blamey – manager
- William Baker – creative director, styling
- Steve Martin – production manager
- Phil Murphy – stage manager
- Leanne Woolrich – assistant
- Warren Anderson – band & dancers assistant

Sound

- Chris Pyne – F.O.H. sound engineer
- Rod Matheson – monitor engineer
- Pat Richardson – sound tech (Note: from Jands Pty Ltd, Australia.)
- Nick Giameos – sound tech
- Jonathon Dunlop – sound tech
- Marcus Lindsey – MIDI/keys tech
- Nick Sizer – drum/percussion tech
- Adge Wiseman – guitar tech

Camera and Electrical

- Chris Keating – tour video director
- Alastiar Mac Diamid – video screens engineer
- Emilio Abbonizio – camera operator
- Honie Rowley – camera operator
- Nicholas Thomsen – camera operator
- Chris Lambourne – lighting tech
- Jon Sellars – lighting tech
- Rob Gawler – lighting director
- Matt Burden – lighting tech (Note: from ByteCraft Entertainment, Melbourne, Australia.)
- Paul Whitehouse – lighting tech
- Rohan Harrison – lighting tech

Music

- Steve Anderson – music producer, co-producer
- Andrew Small – musical director, drums
- James Mack – percussion
- Steve Turner – keyboards
- James Hayto – guitar
- Cris Brown – bass

Choreography

- Luca Tommassini – choreography director
- Roberta Mastromichele – assistant choreographer

Dancers

- Germana Bonaparte – head dancer
- Milena Mancini
- Federica Catalona
- Veronica Peperini
- Tony Bongiorno
- Paolo Sabatini
- Gianluca Frezzato
- Cristian Scionte
- Germana Bonaparte

Costumes and wardrobe

- Carol Minogue – Minogue's wardrobe
- Holly Day – wardrobe
- Julien Macdonald – costumes
- Pamela Blundell – costumes
- Manolo Blahnik – shoes

Hair and makeup

- Karen Alder (Note: for UK leg.)
- Caroline Barnes (Note: for Europe leg.)
- Kevin Murphy (Note: for Australia leg.)
- Rebecca Williams – assistant
