= Live in Sydney (disambiguation) =

Live in Sydney refers to a Kylie Minogue DVD

Live in Sydney may also refer to:

- Live in Sydney, DVD by André Rieu 2009
- Live in Sydney, DVD by Culture Club 1984
- Live in Sydney, DVD by Roxette 1991
- Live in Sydney, DVD by Living Loud 2010
- Live in Sydney, DVD by Arlo Guthrie 2012
- Live in Sydney, DVD by Michael Franti and Spearhead
- Live in Sydney, DVD by k.d. lang
