= Butterfly (Kylie Minogue song) =

2001 promotional single by Kylie Minogue

- US maxi single cover (Note: German fashion photographer Vincent Peters shot the artworks for Light Years, while Mark Farrow was selected to design them. The shoot took place in Ibiza.)

Promotional single by Kylie Minogue

from the album Light Years
- Released: November 2001 (Note: Prior to the single release in the US, two remixes of "Butterfly" were issued as a test pressing in the UK to measure DJ reactions to Minogue's new material.)
- Recorded: 23–25 January 2000
- Studio: Cello, Los Angeles; Hutch, Chicago
- Genre: House; dance-pop; EDM
- Length: 4:06
- Label: Blueplate; Blue^{2}
- Songwriters: Kylie Minogue; Steve Anderson
- Producer: Mark Picchiotti

Audio
- "Butterfly" on YouTube

"Butterfly" is a song by Australian recording artist Kylie Minogue from her seventh studio album Light Years (2000). The song was written by Minogue and Steve Anderson at Real World Studios, Wiltshire in 1999. Minogue recorded her vocals at Cello Studios, Los Angeles in January 2000 with American DJ Mark Picchiotti, who subsequently produced the track in Chicago. "Butterfly" is a contemporary house, dance-pop, and EDM track that portrays spiritual freedom and joy of life. Although Light Years was not released in the US, "Butterfly" was issued as a promotional single through Blueplate Records and its sublabel Blue^{2} Records, both of which are owned by Picchiotti.

Music critics picked the track as an instant standout from the parent album, praising its catchy melody and potential for a hit single. The song peaked at number 14 and spent 12 weeks on the Billboard US Hot Dance Club Play. This success – and the fact that its parent album, Light Years, was not released in the United States – led to the song's inclusion on early versions of the US edition of Minogue's Fever (2002), as a hidden bonus track. Minogue performed the track at London's G-A-Y nightclub (2000) and on her On a Night Like This concert tour (2001), before adding it as a dance interlude in Showgirl: The Homecoming Tour (2006–2007).

== Background and recording ==
Following the commercial disappointment of Impossible Princess (1997), Minogue ended her six-year relationship with Deconstruction Records and signed with Parlophone in June 1999. In an early meeting with Parlophone, Minogue decided to return to her pop roots and believed that the then-upcoming album was a new beginning for her. Before signing with Parlophone, Minogue spent a week with her frequent collaborator Steve Anderson at Real World Studios in Box, Wiltshire, where most of the production of Impossible Princess was completed. "Butterfly" was among the chosen tracks from the session, along with "So Now Goodbye" and "Bittersweet Goodbye". Anderson found that the writing of "Butterfly" was easy; the track, which was composed on a piano, started off as a ballad. By the time they wrote the chorus, Anderson realised the track's potential and made it more upbeat. Anderson recalled: "The Brothers in Rhythm in me leaped in and it all went hands in the air very quickly." He recorded a demo of the track with drums, bass, and Minogue's vocals on it.

Through his manager, American DJ Mark Picchiotti received a CD from Parlophone A&R executive Miles Leonard. The disc contains three demo tracks by Minogue for his consideration, including a cover of "Under the Influence of Love" and "Butterfly". He saw the potential of "Butterfly" and agreed to produce it. He flew to Los Angeles to work with Minogue at the Cello Studios from 23–25 January 2000. During the recording, the producer stacked Minogue's vocals to create a thicker sound, and also layered the chorus several times. Picchiotti was pleased with session and with Minogue's performance, saying she was "incredibly professional." He brought the track back to Hutch Studios in Chicago to add the final touches. When Picchiotti submitted the complete song, which includes sitars and strings arrangement, he was encouraged by the label to change the production to a more club-friendly sound.

== Composition and release ==
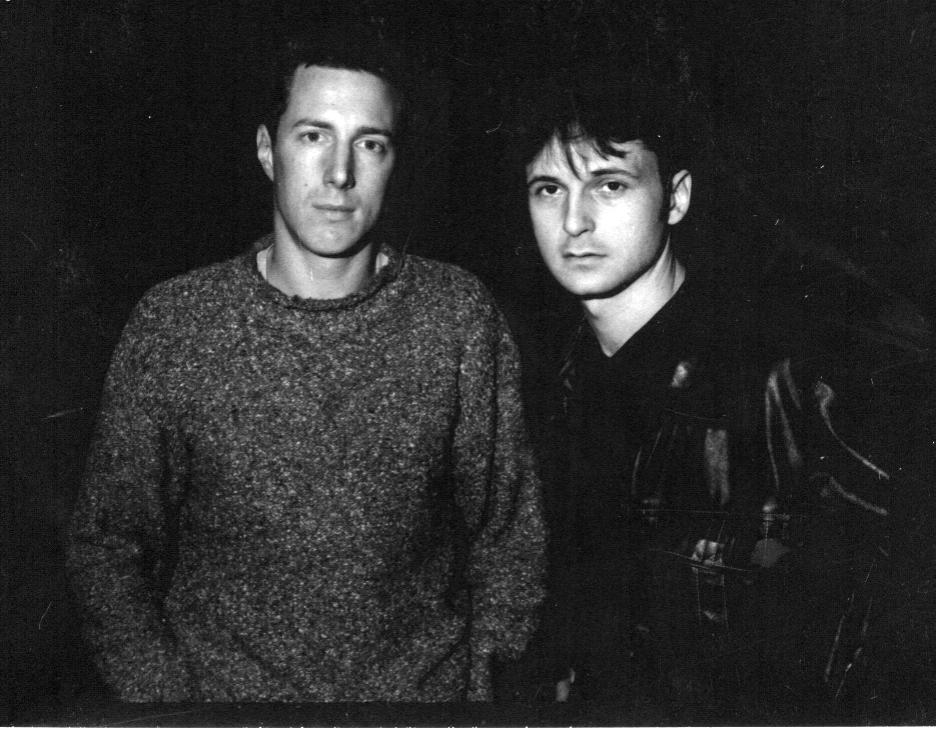
"Butterfly" (Illicit Mix), produced by Dillon & Dickins (pictured in 2000), was chosen for the US release.

Music critics identified "Butterfly" as a contemporary house, dance-pop, and electronic dance track. The song contains electronic drums, basslines, cascading synths, and a flute performance by Paul Mertens. "Butterfly" is written in the key of A♭ minor and has a tempo of 132 beats per minute. The track uses the butterfly image to describe the spiritual freedom and joy of life, with lines such as: "You are more than my everything and your love gives me wings — like a butterfly." Picchiotti instructed Minogue's vocals in order to fit the cheerful theme; she can be heard singing harmonies in a light tone of voice in the background.

Parlophone included "Butterfly" on Minogue's seventh studio album Light Years (2000). Prior to the album, in May 2000, two remixes of the track were issued as a test pressing in the UK to measure DJ reactions to Minogue's new material. "Butterfly" was considered to be the fourth single from Light Years, but was pulled in favour of the Latin-influenced "Please Stay," which was released in December 2000.

Although Light Years was not released in the US, Picchiotti asked permission to release "Butterfly" there via Blueplate Records, an independent label he founded in 1999. He was granted a limited budget and had to commission additional remixes, release and promote the single within six months. Picchiotti produced the Sandstorm Mix, while also picking other remixes and dubs for the single release, including the work by English dance music production group Dillon & Dickins (credited as Illicit) and fellow American DJ E-Smoove. In November 2001, "Butterfly" was released as a promotional single in the US through both Blueplate Records and its sublabel Blue^{2} Records. The single was issued in two formats in 2001: a twelve-inch single, and a double twelve-inch single. In early 2002, a CD single and a maxi single were issued; the covers of the 2002 releases are taken from the photoshoot for Light Years, which show Minogue wearing nothing but a towel.

== Reception and live performances ==
The single releases were only available via the website of Blueplate Records, with buyers required to contact the label by phone for purchases. "Butterfly" debuted at number 42 on the Billboard Hot Dance Club Play in September 2001, her first entry since "Confide in Me" (1994). The single peaked at number 14 in October and spent a total of 12 weeks on the chart, her longest run at the time. Due to its popularity, "Butterfly" was included as a bonus track on the US edition of Minogue's eighth studio album Fever (2002), distributed by Capitol Records.

Nick Levine of Digital Spy and Nick Smith of musicOMH picked "Butterfly" as one of the standout tracks from Light Years. American writer Louis Virtel highlighted the track as one of Minogue's best, praising it as "a blitzing, wing-flapping, runway-dominating flame vortex... [that] turns any club into a happening, hard-thrusting gay bar". Michael Dwyer of The Age found Minogue gives a "hardcore Mardi Gras" performance, while Mike Wass of Idolator praised the fluttery and memorable sound. Levine and Wass believed "Butterfly" should have been picked as a single due to its catchy tunes. Marc Andrews, the author of Kylie Song by Song (2022), commended Picchiotti for making the track "not just dancefloor friendly but literally fly!". Sal Cinquemani of Slant Magazine stated house tracks "On a Night Like This" and "Butterfly" predicted the rise of EDM music and created the template for Minogue's releases over the next 15 years.

Minogue performed "Butterfly" in June 2000 at London's G-A-Y nightclub, along with other songs such as "Spinning Around", "Better the Devil You Know" and "Step Back in Time". She went on to perform the track on her sixth concert tour, On a Night Like This (2001), in which she caressed and interacted with a group of shirtless male dancers. Andrews felt the performance transformed the track into "a sexed-up club banger." Muri Assunção of Billboard praised the sensual and entertaining performance, calling it a tribute to "the gay leather fetish fans;" while Mike Gee of The Sydney Morning Herald highlighted it as an energetic and "ass-shaking fun" segment. The Sandstorm Dub of "Butterfly" was used as a dance interlude in Showgirl: The Homecoming Tour (2006–2007).

== Track listings ==
- Maxi CD single
1. "Butterfly" (Radio Mix) – (4:09)
2. "Butterfly" (Sandstorm Mix) – (7:15)
3. "Butterfly" (E-Smoove Mix) – (8:05)
4. "Butterfly" (Illicit Mix) – (7:19)
5. "Butterfly" (Trisco Mix) – (7:50)
6. "Butterfly" (Havoc Mix) – (7:56)
7. "Butterfly" (Craig J. Mix) – (5:41)
8. "Butterfly" (Sandstorm Dub) – (9:03)
9. "Butterfly" (E-Smoove Dub) – (8:06)
- CD single
1. "Butterfly" (Sandstorm Mix) – (7:15)
2. "Butterfly" (E-Smoove Mix) – (8:05)
3. "Butterfly" (Illicit Mix) – (7:19)
4. "Butterfly" (Trisco Mix) – (6:37)
5. "Butterfly" (Radio Mix) – (4:09)
- 12-inch single
1. "Butterfly" (Sandstorm Vocal Mix) – (7:15)
2. "Butterfly" (E-Smoove Vocal Mix) – (8:05)
3. "Butterfly" (Illicit Mix) – (7:19)
4. "Butterfly" (Trisco Extended Mix) – (7:50)
- Double 12-inch single
1. "Butterfly" (Sandstorm Vocal Mix) – (7:15)
2. "Butterfly" (Sandstorm Dub) – (9:03)
3. "Butterfly" (E-Smoove Dub) – (8:06)
4. "Butterfly" (E-Smoove Vocal Mix) – (8:05)

== Personnel ==
Credits are adapted from the liner notes of Light Years:

- Kylie Minogue – lead vocals, songwriting
- Steve Anderson – songwriting
- Mark Picchiotti – production, mixing
- Tom Carlisle – mix engineer
- Craig J Snider – additional keyboards
- Dem Girls – backing vocals
- Natural – guitars, additional arrangements
- Kraig McCreary – guitars
- Resin Rubbers – strings
- Paul Mertens – flute
- Dave Sears – additional arrangements

== Chart ==
Weekly chart performance for "Butterfly" in 2001
Chart (2001)	Peak position
US Dance Club Songs (Billboard)	14

== Release history ==
Release dates and formats for "Butterfly"
Region	Date	Format	Label(s)	Ref.
United Kingdom	May 2000	White label record	Parlophone	
United Kingdom	November 2001	White label record	Blueplate; Blue^{2}	
United States	November 2001	Twelve-inch single	Blueplate; Blue^{2}	
United States	November 2001	Double twelve-inch single	Blueplate; Blue^{2}	
United States	2002	CD single	Blueplate; Blue^{2}	
United States	2002	Maxi single	Blueplate; Blue^{2}	
