= Live in Sydney =

2001 video by Kylie Minogue

Video by Kylie Minogue
- Released: 1 October 2001
- Recorded: 11 May 2001
- Venue: Sydney Entertainment Centre (Sydney, Australia)
- Genre: Pop
- Length: 124:25
- Label: Rhino; Warner Vision
- Director: Hamish Hamilton
- Producer: Ian Stewart

Kylie Minogue chronology
The Kylie Tapes 94–98 (1998)	Live in Sydney (2001)	Intimate and Live (2002)

Professional ratings
Review scores
Source	Rating
AllMusic	4.5/5 stars

Live in Sydney is the 2001 DVD release of Kylie Minogue's On a Night Like This Tour. The DVD features exclusive backstage footage of the concert, including a look into the dancers dressing rooms and a prank played on Kylie during the show entitled 'Will Kylie Crack'. The DVD was certified 3× Platinum in Australia.

== Track listing ==
Live in Sydney
No.	Title	Writer(s)	Length
1.	"Overture"		2:36
2.	"Titles"		0:27
3.	"Love Boat"	Kylie Minogue; Guy Chambers; Robbie Williams	5:19
4.	"Koocachoo"	Minogue; Johnny Douglas	3:57
5.	"Hand on Your Heart"	Mike Stock; Matt Aitken; Pete Waterman	4:10
6.	"Kylie Talks"		0:49
7.	"Put Yourself in My Place"	Jimmy Harry	4:55
8.	"On a Night Like This"	Steve Torch; Graham Stack; Mark Taylor; Brian Rawling	3:41
9.	"Step Back in Time"/"Never Too Late"/"Wouldn't Change a Thing"/"Turn It into Love"/"Celebration" (medley)	Stock; Aitken; Waterman / Stock; Aitken; Waterman / Stock; Aitken; Waterman / Stock; Aitken; Waterman / Robert Bell; James Taylor	8:21
10.	"Kylie Gets a 'Mexican Wave'"		2:06
11.	"Can't Get You Out of My Head"	Cathy Dennis; Rob Davis	4:14
12.	"Your Disco Needs You"	Minogue; Chambers; Williams	3:47
13.	"I Should Be So Lucky"	Stock; Aitken; Waterman	2:15
14.	"Better the Devil You Know"	Stock; Aitken; Waterman	4:38
15.	"So Now Goodbye"	Minogue; Steve Anderson	4:04
16.	"Physical"	Steve Kipner; Terry Shaddick	5:11
17.	"Butterfly"	Minogue; Anderson	6:00
18.	"Confide in Me"	Anderson; Dave Seaman; Owain Barton	5:12
19.	"Kids"	Williams; Chambers	4:23
20.	"Shocked"	Stock; Aitken; Waterman; Pauline Bennett	5:51
21.	"Light Years"	Minogue; Richard Stannard; Julian Gallagher	6:22
22.	"Band & Dancers Intros"		1:12
23.	"What Do I Have to Do?"	Stock; Aitken; Waterman	4:40
24.	"Spinning Around"	Ira Shickman; Osborne Bingham; Kara DioGuardi; Paula Abdul	6:34
25.	"Credits"		1:55
Total length:			102:39

Backstage
No.	Title	Length
26.	"Pre-show Nerves"	2:28
27.	"The Girl Dancers"	1:07
28.	"The Boy Dancers"	1:54
29.	"Costume"	1:04
30.	"The Insiders' View"	3:24
31.	"Waiting in the Wings"	0:57
32.	"Will Kylie Crack?"	2:11
33.	"Behind the Scenes"	2:55
34.	"The Final Stage Exit"	2:20
Total length:		18:20

Promo
No.	Title	Director(s)	Length
35.	"Spinning Around" (music video)	Dawn Shadforth	3:26

== Charts ==
Chart performance for Live in Sydney
Chart (2001)	Peak position
UK DVDs (OCC)	11
UK Music Videos (OCC)	1
UK Videos (OCC)	12

== Certifications ==
Certifications and sales for Live in Sydney
Region	Certification	Certified units/sales
Australia (ARIA)	3× Platinum	45,000^{^}
United Kingdom (BPI)	2× Platinum	100,000^{^}
^{^} Shipments figures based on certification alone.

== Release history ==
Release dates and formats for Live in Sydney
Region	Date	Format(s)	Cat. no.	Distributor(s)	Ref(s).
Various	1 October 2001	DVD	0927405532	Warner Vision	
Various	1 October 2001	VHS	0927405533	Warner Vision	
Various	1 October 2001	VCD	0927405535	Warner Vision	
Japan	7 November 2001	DVD	WPBR-90036	Warner Vision	
