= Light Years (Kylie Minogue album) =

2000 studio album by Kylie Minogue

Studio album by Kylie Minogue
- Released: 22 September 2000
- Recorded: 1999–2000
- Studios: Metropolis (London); Angel (London); Blah St. (Hampshire); Studio 2 (Dublin); Olympic (London); Real World (Box); Therapy (London); Master Rock (London); Sarm Hook End (London)
- Genres: Dance-pop; disco; Europop
- Length: 58:16
- Labels: Parlophone; Festival Mushroom
- Producers: Steve Anderson; Guy Chambers; Johnny Douglas; Julian Gallagher; Mark Picchiotti; Steve Power; Mike Spencer; Graham Stack; Richard "Biff" Stannard; Mark Taylor

Kylie Minogue chronology
Intimate and Live (1998)	Light Years (2000)	Hits + (2000)

Singles from Light Years
- 1. "Spinning Around" Released: 19 June 2000; 2. "On a Night Like This" Released: 11 September 2000; 3. "Kids" Released: 9 October 2000; 4. "Please Stay" Released: 11 December 2000; 5. "Your Disco Needs You" Released: 22 January 2001

Light Years is the seventh studio album by Australian singer Kylie Minogue. Mushroom Records released it on 22 September 2000 in Australia; Parlophone released it on 25 September 2000 in the United Kingdom. Following the commercial failure of Impossible Princess (1997), Minogue left Deconstruction Records and took a hiatus from recording music. She signed with Parlophone in June 1999 and decided to return to her pop roots. She worked with various writers and producers, including Steve Anderson, Johnny Douglas, Robbie Williams, Guy Chambers, and Mark Picchiotti.

Light Years is a dance-pop, disco, and Europop album that refers to music from the 1970s. Lyrically, the album touches upon themes of women's empowerment, celebration, and sex, in a cheeky and campy approach. Music critics provided positive reviews, complimenting Minogue's return to pop despite them being ambivalent towards the lyrical content. Retrospectively, Light Years has been recognised as one of Minogue's strongest releases. The album won the ARIA Award for Best Female Artist and Best Pop Release at the 2001 ceremonies. Light Years peaked in the top position on the Australian Albums Chart, Minogue's first number-one album in her native Australia. It reached the top 10 in Russia, Scotland, New Zealand, and on the UK Albums Chart.

Five singles were released from Light Years, including "Spinning Around" and "On a Night Like This", which both reached number one in Australia, as well as the top 20 entries "Kids" and "Please Stay". All peaked inside the top 10 in the UK. The final single, "Your Disco Needs You" was only released in Australia and Germany. Light Years was further promoted with the On a Night Like This Tour, which visited Europe and Australia from March to May 2001. At the time, it was the highest-grossing tour by a solo artist in Australia, with ticket sales of approximately US$5 million. The album was re-issued in Europe in 2018 and returned to the UK Albums Chart and the Scottish Albums Chart.

== Background ==
In 1997, Kylie Minogue released her sixth studio album, Impossible Princess. The album represented a drastic change in the singer's musical direction, incorporating elements of electronica and alternative music. The British public was unimpressed with her new musical direction, viewing it as a trend-chasing attempt, and failed to identify with her new intimate image as "IndieKylie". The backlash resulted in Impossible Princess having little impact on British record charts—it initially peaked at number 10 on the UK Albums Chart and sold only 18,000 copies in the first two weeks of release. After embarking on a successful promotional tour, Minogue left Deconstruction Records and BMG in November 1998, ending their six-year relationship.

Following the split, Minogue took a break from recording music to focus on her acting career. She spent several months in Barbados performing Miranda in Toby Gough's production of The Tempest during an annual operatic festival. She also starred in the Australian films Cut and Sample People, both released in 2000. She gave several live performances in Australia, including the 1998 Sydney Gay and Lesbian Mardi Gras, the opening ceremonies of Melbourne's Crown Casino and Sydney's Fox Studios in 1999. Minogue performed Duran Duran's 1984 single "The Reflex" on the tribute complication Undone: The Songs of Duran Duran (1999), and collaborated with the Pet Shop Boys on a duet, titled "In Denial", on their 1999 studio album Nightlife.

Following "In Denial", Parlophone—a British record label the Pet Shop Boys had been with since 1985—decided to sign Minogue in June 1999. She announced she would start working on a new album, saying: "I took my time in choosing a new label [...] there is much I hope to achieve with my next album and I believe that anything is possible with this new partnership." Parlophone A&R executive Miles Leonard commented: "I believed that [Minogue] was still very strong vocally, and still definitely a star... I believed in her as an artist and I knew that with the right project, the right songwriters, the right producers, the right team, she would still have a fanbase out there."

== Development and recording ==
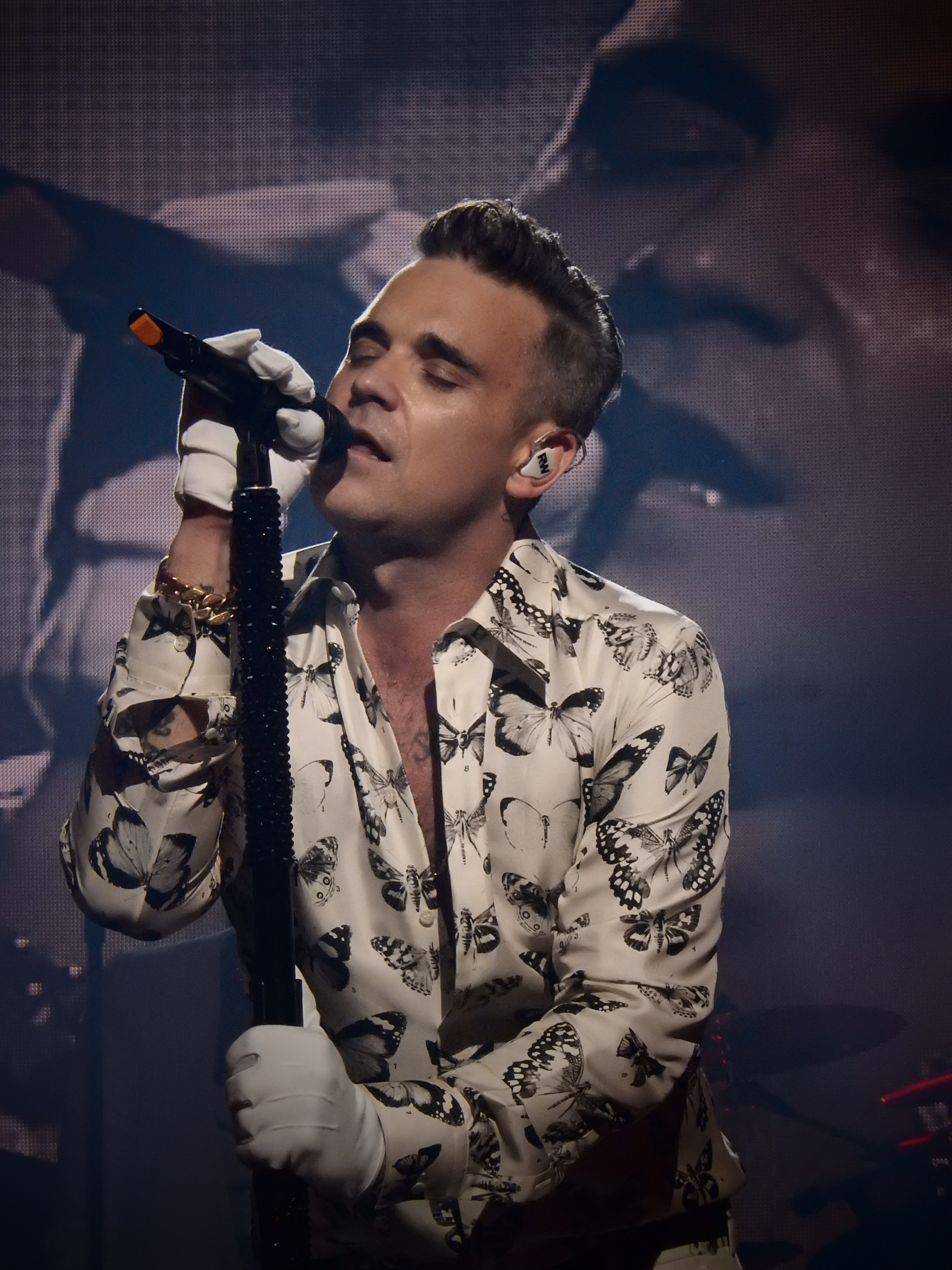
Robbie Williams (pictured in 2016) collaborated with Minogue on "Kids" and co-wrote two more tracks on Light Years.

In an early meeting with Parlophone to discuss which direction Minogue intended to pursue, the singer decided to return to her pop roots, saying "I should do what I do best... [Pop music] is the kind of music that people want from me." Minogue believed the album was a new beginning, as she started singing pop music again. Minogue was inspired by the music of the 1970s, which she discovered when she was a child via her parents' record collection, including the soundtrack from Grease (1978), Donna Summer's "Bad Girls" and "Dim All the Lights" (both in 1979). The label did not want to make another Pete Waterman Limited (PWL) record, but quality pop music with the help of great contributions and collaborations. Her team approached PWL owner Pete Waterman, who had worked with Minogue earlier in her career, during the production. However, the collaboration did not happen.

Minogue enjoyed making Light Years; she got a chance to work with people who were certain how they wanted her to sound. She felt that working with different producers would help the album have a diverse feeling. She wanted the album to be song-driven and explained the musical styles to the producers with three keywords: "poolside", "disco", and "cocktails". Minogue worked on Light Years in Sydney, London, and Los Angeles, where she put the final touches on the album. Before signing with Parlophone, Minogue spent a week with her frequent collaborator Steve Anderson at Real World Studios in Box, Wiltshire, where most of the production of Impossible Princess was done. Three tracks were chosen from the session: "So Now Goodbye", "Butterfly", and "Bittersweet Goodbye". Minogue picked "Bittersweet Goodbye" when she was deep in the production process, saying it made her feel calm. A string arrangement by Wil Malone was added to the track, while Anderson kept Minogue's vocals from the original demo. Chicago-based DJ Mark Picchiotti flew to Los Angeles to record Minogue's vocals for "Butterfly", and then produced the track in his hometown.

Former Take That member Robbie Williams contributed three songs with his songwriting partner Guy Chambers: "Loveboat", "Your Disco Needs You", and "Kids". Minogue shared the songwriting credit on the first two. She found in Williams her ideal male counterpart based on their similar musical output; she felt the work between Williams and Chamber was extraordinary. Chamber co-wrote another track with Minogue titled "I'm So High". They were among the earliest collaborations, which Minogue felt were a good foundation for the album. Minogue wrote the lyrics to "Light Years" with Biffco's songwriters Richard Stannard and Julian Gallagher in 10 minutes. The demo, originally titled "Light Relief", was unexpectedly favoured by the label and was picked up for the final tracklist. The songwriters also collaborated on "Please Stay".

Minogue made several demos with a set of writers and producers arranged by Brian Rawling, including Steve Torch, Graham Stack, and Mark Taylor. She ended up recording "On a Night Like This", a song written originally for the Swedish recording artist Pandora for her 1999 album No Regrets. In New York, A&R executive Jamie Nelson pitched a demo of "Spinning Around" to Minogue and she agreed to record it. The track—written by Ira Shickman, Osborne Bingham, Kara DioGuardi, and Paula Abdul—was originally intended to be featured on Abdul's studio album, but it was given to Minogue after the album failed to materialise. Minogue recorded "Under the Influence of Love", a song written by Paul Politi and Barry White that Love Unlimited covered in 1974. The track reminded Minogue of her previous songs, despite having not heard it before the production of Light Years. Johnny Douglas wrote and produced "Password", "Disco Down", and "Koocachoo"; he also produced "So Now Goodbye", a track that Minogue wrote with Anderson.

== Musical styles ==
Music critics have characterised Light Years as a dance-pop, disco, and Europop album. The album marked a return to her signature pop style, following the experimental record Impossible Princess. A reviewer from Sputnikmusic and Nick Levine of Digital Spy emphasise elements of disco, the 1970s and early 2000s music. AllMusic's Chris True noted the album reflects the late 1990s teen pop movement. Yahoo! Music's Gary Crossing referred to the album as a "largely undemanding collection of disco, Hi-NRG, Ibizan trance, funk, 60s film and TV themes and Latin-flavoured tunes". Elements of house, electronica, psychedelic pop, Eurodisco, and French Touch were highlighted by Nick Smith of musicOMH and Ian Gormely of Exclaim!. Described the album as being filled with "crisp rhythm sections, melodic orchestral passages and vivid grooves", Albumism's Quentin Harrison also noted influences from 1970s artists Cheryl Lynn, Tina Charles, and The Hues Corporation.

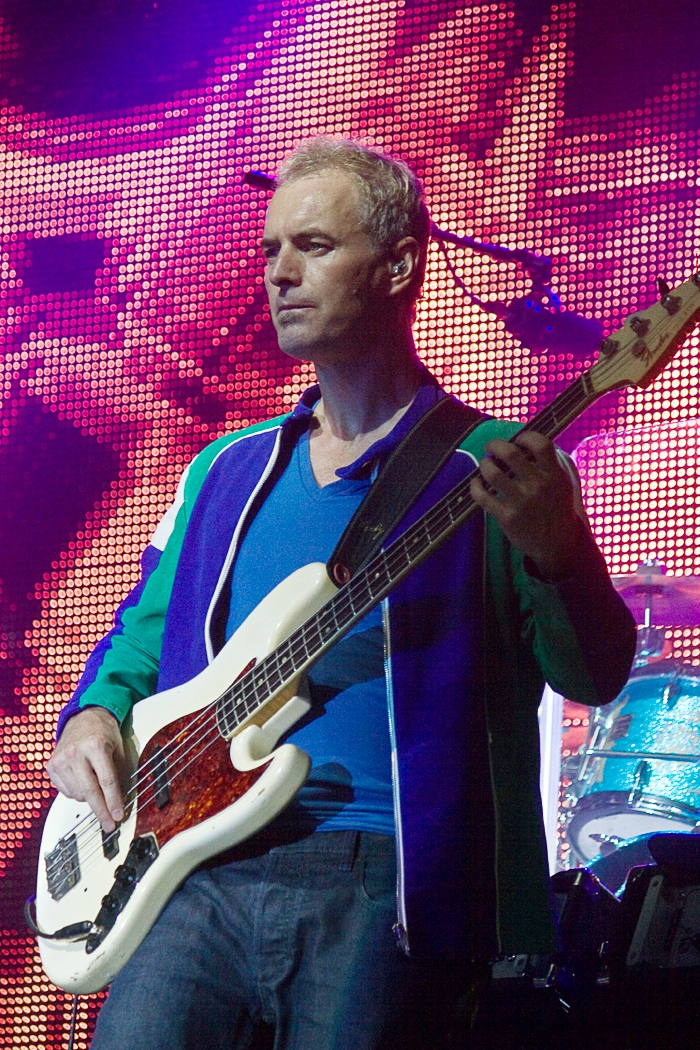
English bassist Paul Turner (pictured in 2011) played bass and guitars on "Koocachoo".

The opening track, "Spinning Around", is a string-laden dance-pop song with prominent influences from disco music. The Guardian's Betty Clarke opined that the track sets the tone for Light Years and compared it to Minogue's "Hand on Your Heart" (1989). "So Now Goodbye"—a track that blends house, disco, and electronica elements—draws inspiration from Gloria Gaynor's "I Will Survive" (1978), Madonna's "Lucky Star" (1983) and the work of American band Earth, Wind & Fire. The bittersweet "Disco Down" was compared to the work of Giorgio Moroder and featured Christmassy church bells during the chorus. Michael Dwyer of The Age found Minogue goes "hardcore Mardi Gras" on the contemporary house and electronic dance track "Butterfly". "On a Night Like This" has a darker, more Europop edge, which was compared to Spiller's "Groovejet (If This Ain't Love)" (2000).

Backing vocals and the arrangement of strings and fluttering flutes drive the fifth track, "Loveboat". The song features funky light guitar and faux-French effects. "Loveboat" was compared to the work of Barry Manilow, Minogue's "I Don't Need Anyone" (1997), and Williams's "Millennium" (1998). "Koocachoo" has elements of jazz and the 1960s music, and built around a chirping synth and horn arrangement. The track contains a groovy bass riff, retro guitar tone, sitar, keyboard sound effects, and "ba baba ba" harmonies in the chorus. English bassist Paul Turner contributed bass and guitars to the track. "Your Disco Needs You" is a disco track that is heavily influenced by Village People's "Go West" (1979). Minogue sings in a serious tone, accompanied by a brass section, regal horns, a male chorus, and high soprano back-up vocals. Cameron Adams from the Herald Sun felt that the song is a hybrid between Village People's "Y.M.C.A." (1978) and Queen's "Bohemian Rhapsody" (1975), while Chris Charles of the BBC News described it as "ABBA and the Pet Shop Boys getting down at the hottest gay club in town".

The samba-infused "Password" was used as a pregap hidden introductory track. "Please Stay" features Latin pop, soft acoustic, and flamenco elements. Crossing found "Bittersweet Goodbye", the album's only sentimental ballad, to be a "strange concoction" of Olivia Newton-John, Kate Bush and Cocteau Twins. It is followed by Minogue's cover of "Under the Influence of Love" (1967), in which her vocals are double-tracked for the bridge. Smith referred to the track as "Saint Etienne meets the best of the Nolans". The guitar-driven pop track "I'm So High" contains a subtle and slowly building melody. Dwyer wrote songs like "I'm So High" help Minogue "leave the club floor for car radio with equally enjoyable results". The penultimate track is "Kids", a joyous pop duet with Williams. It has funky groove rhythms and a distorted, guitar-driven euphoric chorus with soft guitars, synths, and vocal crescendos. English musicians Chris Sharrock and Neil Taylor played percussion and guitars on "Kids", respectively. The Village Voice's Emma Pearse felt that the song helps Minogue transport her energy "into Prince and Beck territory". The post-disco title track is an homage to Summer's "I Feel Love" (1977), featuring harmonies and electronic touches. The track reminds Clarke of Brotherhood of Man's "Angelo" (1977).

== Themes ==
Minogue called Light Years an uplifting and vibrant record, with mostly happy songs that reflect her easy nature when she was making the album. She said listening to it felt like being on a summer holiday. Lyrically, Minogue said that she was "really going for it... [without] holding back", with several songs containing cheekiness, showgirl images, or camp elements. The songs were written from her imagination, rather than the autobiographical style of songwriting that she had experimented with on her previous record Impossible Princess. Minogue recalled writing each song as if it was a scene from a film or a video and trying to interpret and convert the idea into a song. Harrison highlighted Minogue's ability to focus on themes of flirtation, fun, and romance "without undercutting her previous growth as an artist" on Impossible Princess.

"Spinning Around" (2000)
Minogue declares that she has changed and learned from her past mistakes on "Spinning Around". The Guardian's Betty Clarke opined that the track sets the tone for Light Years.

Betty Clarke of The Guardian identified the theme of women's empowerment and celebration. She called Light Years "an album that celebrates being a girl", and commented that "not since the Spice Girls has the capacity to fill a dress been so celebrated". "Spinning Around" declares Minogue has changed and learned from her past mistakes. True and Smith interpreted it as Minogue's move away from her more experimental work on Impossible Princess. Pam Avoledo of Blogcritics found the amorous song depicted a woman who is expressing herself and taking control of her life. Clarke viewed "On a Night Like This" and "So Now Goodbye" as the up-tempo disco antics that successfully depict the notions of "grabbing the best looking man in the club, then ditching him when you feel like it". "Butterfly" discusses the spiritual freedom and joy of life, while "Bittersweet Goodbye" is a stripped-back ode to love. Smith viewed the track as a tribute to her former lover Michael Hutchence, who died in November 1997.

Writing for The Sydney Morning Herald, Catherine Keenan wrote the album is "full of gay club anthems and not short on sex". Minogue calls for the listener to join her on the dance floor on "Your Disco Needs You". At one point, she delivers a military-like spoken interlude in French: "Vous êtes jamais seuls / Vous savez ce qu'il faut faire / Ne laissez pas tomber votre nation / La disco a besoin de vous!" ("You are never alone / You know what to do / Don't let your nation down / The disco needs you!") "Loveboat" is an homage to the 1970s television series of the same name, while referencing martinis, bikinis and James Bond in its lyrics. It contains several French phrases and cheeky lines such as "Rub on some lotion / The places I can't reach." Levine referred to the lyrics of "Loveboat" as a sensual couplet. Smith felt that the track is a mixture of kitsch and tropicana, and Minogue sounds ebullient. The penultimate track is "Kids", a joyous pop duet with Williams. The track references to the careers of both Minogue and Williams, with Minogue singing the line: "I've been dropping beats since Back in Black." On the title track, Minogue plays an air hostess on a fictional KM-Air flight. Adams found Minogue devoted to the erotic track.

== Packaging and release ==
German fashion photographer Vincent Peters shot the artwork for Light Years, while Mark Farrow was selected to design the cover. The shoot took place in Ibiza, a place that Minogue felt "has a magical quality" to it. On the cover, wearing a blue chiffon swimsuit, Minogue stares into the distance. The cover has a backdrop of the sky and the sea, with a glimpse of a golden sunset filtering through. Parlophone dropped Minogue's surname on the cover, and branded it as a "Kylie" album. Minogue wanted the cover to capture the music's essence: sunshine, beach, fun, and glamour. She thought the photoshoot was extraordinary, and the "lightness of the chiffon matched [her] mood and desire". Another picture from the photoshoot saw a head-to-knees Minogue wearing nothing but a towel. Peters felt Minogue has a strong sense of self, which sets her apart from other celebrities he had worked with. William Baker, who helped through the album process, said that he wanted a cover that was "a visual statement about [Minogue] reclaiming the throne of the Princess of Pop" and the result shows she has "returned to her rightful place!"

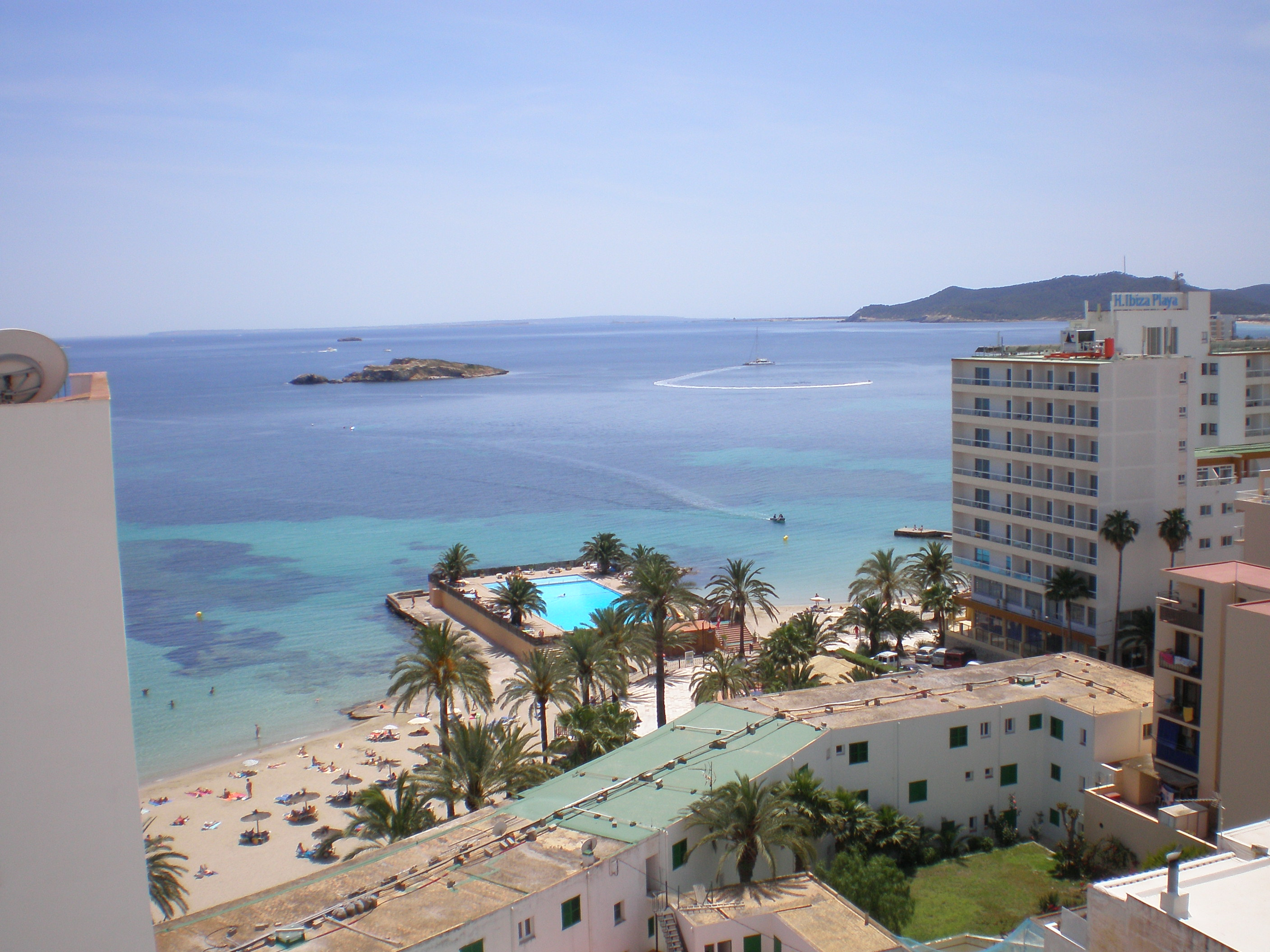
The artwork for Light Years was shot in Ibiza (pictured in 2009).

Crossing found the glossy sleeve artwork "leaves very little to the imagination" and that Minogue is "unashamedly playing [her] 'never mind the book, have a gander at the cover' card". Clarke wrote Light Years was packaged "with male hormones in mind". Charles found it tacky, while John Earls of Classic Pop noted its commercialized nature, commenting that the artwork is better suited for a Ministry of Sound compilation and the cover is the only dull aspect of Light Years. From the same publication, Christian Guiltenane wrote Minogue created "a stunning fantasy figure" with the sunset's glow behind her. Writing for Idolator, Mike Wass commented that the "camp, fun and flirty" cover successfully captured the music of Light Years.

Minogue titled the album Light Years describing her career journey, which she believes will continue as she has just begun to discover herself. She said: "I feel like I've come a long way... I think some other forces know where I'm going, but I'm not meant to know–that would've ruined it." Clarke felt the title was Minogue's response to Ray of Light, a similarly named 1998 album by Madonna. The album includes "Password", a hidden introductory track in the pregap portion of the CD. The listener can only hear the track by rewinding the opening song "Spinning Around". Robbie Williams, who usually has hidden tracks at the end of his albums, inspired this. Minogue said that although she was making a grown-up album, she wanted to keep a sense of enjoyment. She admitted the method is "a bit odd and silly, but that's the fun of it". Smith felt the track was hard to find, while Earls commented the decision was made at "the peak of the CD boom" and "Password" is a worthy reward.

Mushroom Records first released the album in Australia on 22 September 2000. Parlophone released it on 25 September 2000 in the UK. On the German, Spanish and Japanese versions of the album, the original French spoken interlude of "Your Disco Needs You" was translated into their respective languages. EMI released the album in Canada on 26 September 2000 and distributed the album in North America. A special tour edition package was released in the UK on 5 March 2001, containing a second disc featuring various remixes. For the Australian tour edition, additional remixes were included as well as Minogue's cover of Olivia Newton-John's "Physical" (1981), which she performed during the tour. The album was re-issued by Parlophone in Japan in 2003, 2007, 2009, and 2011. In 2018, Light Years was re-released by BMG as a blue vinyl exclusively through Sainsbury's supermarket chain in Europe, limited to 2500 copies.

== Promotion ==
=== Live performances and tour ===
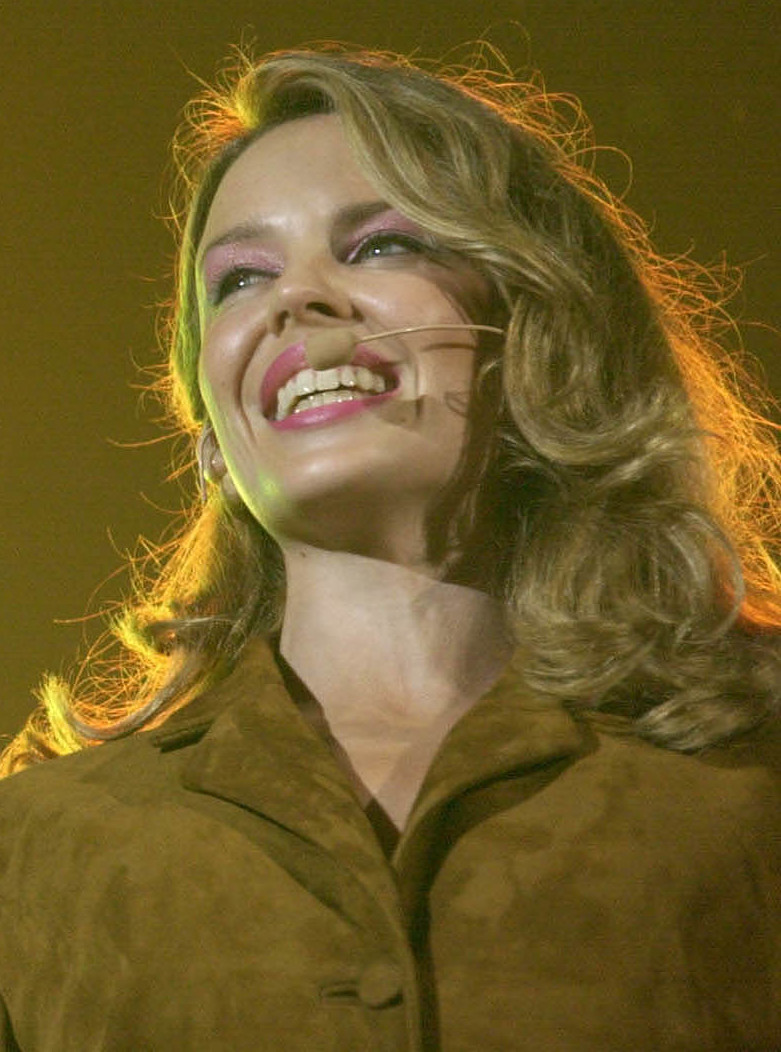
Minogue at the opening ceremony of the 2000 Sydney Summer Paralympics, where she performed the album's lead single, "Spinning Around".

Shortly after signing with Parlophone, Minogue and Baker released an elaborate art book titled Kylie. The photography-only book celebrates fan memorabilia, commentary, and Minogue's life. The book contains a nude sketch of Minogue, and several celebrities such as Elle MacPherson, fashion designer Vivienne Westwood, actor Barry Humphries, and singer Boy George. Minogue appeared on the controversial cover of the June issue of GQ shot by Terry Richardson, wearing a white tennis dress showing her naked bottom with the banner "Kylie: At Your Service".

Minogue did an extensive promotion campaign for the album, appearing on various television programs and at music festivals. On 17 June 2000, before the album's release, Minogue appeared specially at London's G-A-Y nightclub where she performed several songs, including "Spinning Around", "Better the Devil You Know" and "Step Back in Time". In July, she performed at Party in the Park in Hyde Park and Mardi Gras London in Finsbury Park. Wearing a pink showgirl costume, she performed ABBA's "Dancing Queen" (1976) and "On a Night Like This" to an audience of 100,000 people at the 2000 Sydney Olympics closing ceremony in October. Later that month, she sang "Waltzing Matilda", "Celebration" (1992), and "Spinning Around" at the 2000 Summer Paralympics opening ceremony.

Minogue promoted the album with her sixth concert tour, On a Night Like This. She performed in Europe in March 2001, before visiting Australia in April and May. Broadway shows and the musicals of the 1930s inspired the tour's style. In the United Kingdom, the tour sold 140,000 tickets in one weekend. In Australia, Minogue played a record-breaking nine concerts at the Sydney Entertainment Centre, beating the previous record held by AC/DC for the most dates performed at the venue in a single tour. It was the biggest tour by a solo artist in the country, grossing U.S. $5 million from sales of 200,000 tickets. Minogue's concert on 11 May 2001 was filmed and released on home video under the title Live in Sydney.

=== Singles ===
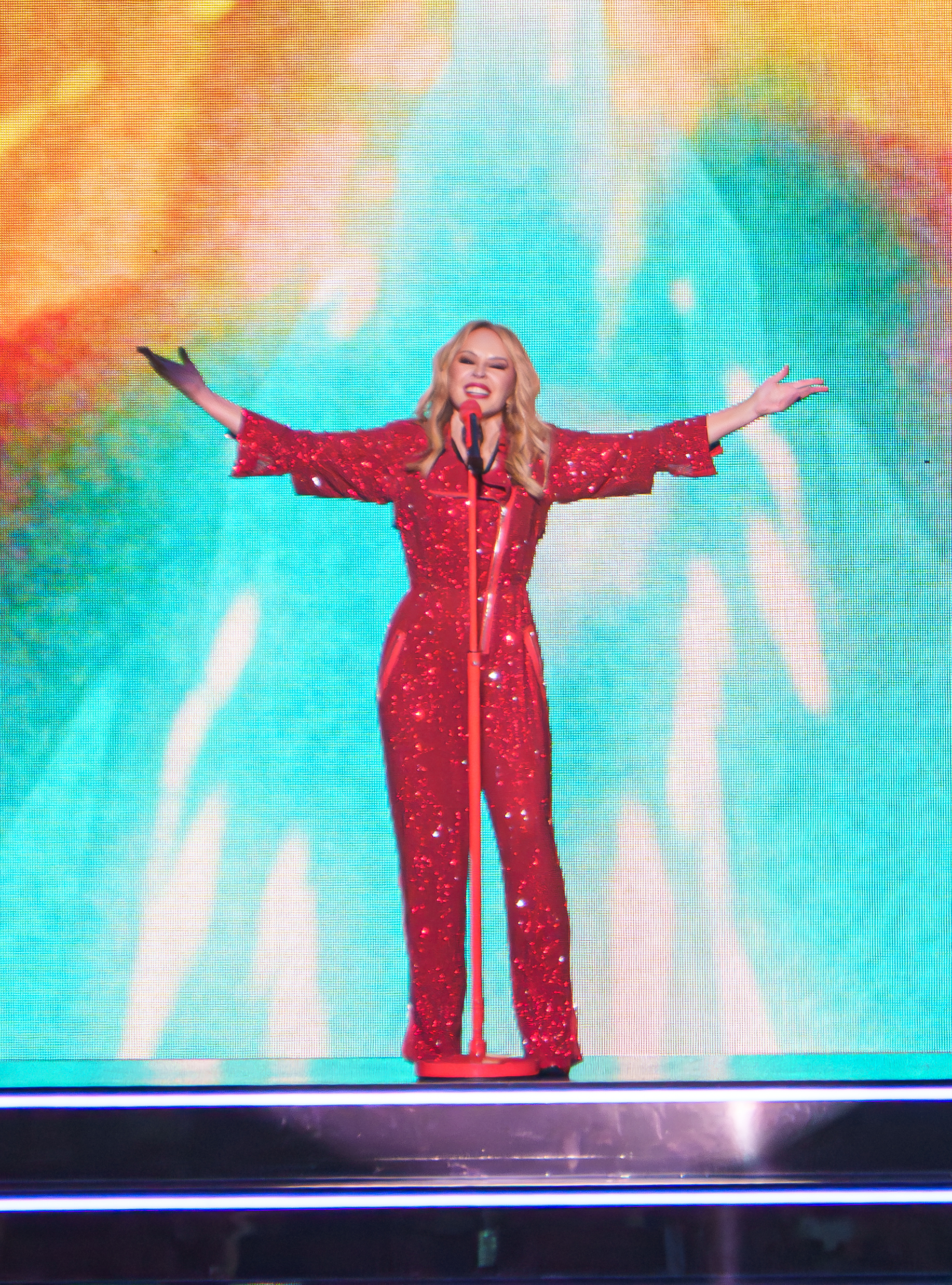
Minogue performing second single "On a Night Like This" during the Tension Tour (2025). The song became her sixth number-one in Australia.

"Spinning Around" was released as the lead single from Light Years in June 2000. Two previously unreleased tracks, the alternative dance "Cover Me With Kisses" and acoustic track "Paper Dolls", were included on the single's B-side. Liz Collins shot the single's artwork, which captured Minogue dressed in pastel pink clutching a hula hoop. Directed by Dawn Shadforth, the music video features Minogue in revealing gold hotpants. The song entered the Australian Singles Chart at number one, becoming the singer's first chart-topper since "Confide in Me" (1994). The song debuted at number one in the United Kingdom, making her only the second artist to have a number-one single in three consecutive decades (after Madonna). It was her fifth number-one single in the UK and her first in a decade, following "Tears on My Pillow" (1990).

The second single, "On a Night Like This", was released in September, with the ballad "Ocean Blue" as the B-side track. It debuted at number one in Australia, making it her sixth number-one in that region; it also gave her the record for having the most singles debuting at number one with five entries. On the UK Singles Chart, the single debuted at number two. An accompanying music video, directed by Douglas Avery, was filmed in Monte Carlo in July. The plot is loosely based on Martin Scorsese's 1995 crime drama movie Casino, with Minogue portraying a trophy wife; Dutch actor Rutger Hauer served as her on-screen husband. An accompanying cover sleeve was taken from the booklet of Light Years, featuring Minogue lying on a marble surface before a sea front.

"Kids" was released as the third single from Light Years and as the second from Williams' album Sing When You're Winning in October. Four original tracks by Williams appeared as B-side tracks: "John's Gay", "Often", "Karaoke Star", and "Kill Me or Cure Me". The music video, directed by Simon Hilton, contains choreography taken from Grease and references to Busby Berkley. The single peaked at number fourteen in Australia and at number two in the United Kingdom. Released on December, the fourth single "Please Stay" peaked at number 10 on the UK Singles Chart, her 20th top 10 entry, and number 15 on the Australian Singles Chart. It was the final release from Light Years in the UK, and was backed by two B-side tracks: a cover of "Santa Baby" and the previously unreleased track "Good Life". The music video saw Minogue sliding down a fireman's pole and dancing on top of a pool table.

"Your Disco Needs You" was chosen as the final single, released only in Australia and Germany. It includes specially commissioned mixes of the track and "Password". Hugely popular as an album track, it was never released as a single in the UK because the content was considered "too gay" and "too camp". The decision sparked protests and petitions from fans lobbying for its release. A music video featuring scenes of Minogue dancing in formation accompanied the single's release in Germany. The track peaked at number 20 in Australia and number 31 in Germany. "Butterfly", a track that was in the running to be the fourth single, was remixed and issued in the US as a promotional single by Mark Picchiotti's Blueplate Records in November 2001. It peaked at number fourteen on the Billboard Hot Dance Club Play chart.

== Critical reception ==
Professional ratings
Review scores
Source	Rating
AllMusic	4/5 stars
The Age	3.5/5 stars
Digital Spy	5/5 stars
Encyclopedia of Popular Music	4/5 stars
entertainment.ie	3/5 stars
The Gazette	2/4 stars
The Guardian	4/5 stars
NME	6/10
Select	4/5 medals
Yahoo! Music	5/10

Light Years received generally positive reviews from contemporary music critics. The Guardian assigned a normalized rating out of 10 to reviews from UK mainstream critics—the album has an average score of 5.8 based on 6 reviews. NME wrote "Light Years is all you need to know about Kylie in less than an hour: fun, perfectly-formed, not too taxing and occasionally annoying". Dorian Lynskey of Select called it "an unrelenting hoot" that is filled with potential singles and fearlessly derivative. Clarke praised Minogue's newfound confidence, noting she has "her tongue firmly in her cheek for this camp slice of epic disco". Dwyer praised the "breezy disco hedonism" nature of Light Years, while Pearse wrote the album is among "some decidedly classy classic pop creations".

Several reviewers were displeased with the album's non-substantive production. Andrew Lynch of entertainment.ie viewed the album as inconsequential and uneven, although he considered it "a much better record [as a whole] than most critics would like to admit". Crossing found the album well-produced, but was critical of the songwriting effort and its cheeky content. Charles thought that Minogue "has become a parody of herself" with an album filled with catchy, throwaway pop songs. Bernard Zuel of The Sydney Morning Herald wrote Williams and Chambers' contributions keep Light Years from being completely disposable. In their negative reviews, T'Cha Dunlevy of The Gazette and Sandra Sperounes of Edmonton Journal dismissed the record as lightweight and unimaginative, and said that Minogue "is still doing her best Madonna's impression."

Retrospectively, Light Years is generally considered to be one of Minogue's strongest releases. It was one of three of Minogue's studio albums to receive a four-star rating from British writer Colin Larkin in the Encyclopedia of Popular Music (2011) with Rhythm of Love (1990) and Fever (2001). He classified it as "high standard". Smith praised Minogue's confidence, calling the album a game-changer and her most accessible work since Rhythm of Love. Levine commented that "as far as fruity little party records go, Light Years is an absolute peach". In 2018, Sal Cinquemani of Slant Magazine ranked Light Years as Minogue fourth-best studio album for its outstanding production. Harrison praised Minogue's spirited vocal performance, and concluded that besides its carefree appeal, Light Years has an "unrecognized compositional breadth and vitality that affirms Minogue's ongoing commitment to music excellence".

== Commercial performance ==
Upon its release, Light Years debuted in second position on the ARIA Charts the week of 8 October 2000, denied the top position by The Games of the XXVII Olympiad: Official Music from the Opening Ceremony, the official album of the 2000 Summer Olympics opening ceremony. In its third charting week, it rose to number one, becoming Minogue's first number-one album in her home country, 12 years after her debut album was released. The album spent 23 weeks in the top ten and remained inside the top 20 for over 30 consecutive weeks, from October 2000 to June 2001. It fell off the chart for the first time in July 2001, before re-entering at number 40 in October when Fever was released. In total, Light Years spent 43 weeks on the top 50 chart, beating Impossible Princess as Minogue's longest-charting album at the time. Within the year 2000, the album was certified quadruple platinum by the Australian Recording Industry Association (ARIA) for sales exceeding 280,000 copies. It appeared on the ARIA year-end album charts for 2000 and 2001 at number seventeen on both, and the decade-end chart at number 69. In New Zealand, the album debuted and peaked at number eight the week of 22 October; Light Years marked Minogue's highest-charting album in New Zealand since Enjoy Yourself peaked at number six in 1989.

The album debuted at number two on the UK Albums Chart during the week of 7 October 2000, behind Madonna's Music. On 9 February 2001, it was certified platinum by the British Phonographic Industry (BPI) for shipments of more than 300,000 units. It was Minogue's most successful album sales-wise since Enjoy Yourself in 1989. When Fever was released in October 2001, Light Years had remained in the top 100 for 27 non-consecutive weeks. From January to May 2002, the album re-entered the chart, staying for 11 weeks. In 2018, the reissue of Light Years peaked at number 36 on the UK Albums Chart on 7 June; it was the third best-selling vinyl album of the week. That same week, the reissue also appeared on the Scottish Albums Chart, reaching number 21—Light Years had previously peaked at number 3 there after its original release in 2000. In Ireland, the album spent five weeks on the chart and peaked at number 13. Light Years had sold 508,739 copies in the UK as of September 2023, and in total the album spent a total of 39 non-consecutive weeks on the Official Albums Chart.

According to Music & Media, Light Years peaked at number 10 on the European Top 100 Albums chart. The album peaked within the top 40 in several European countries, including Belgium, Finland, Germany, Hungary, Poland, Sweden, and Switzerland. Light Years also reached number 50 in France, and number 71 in Netherlands. In South Africa, the album peaked at number 11 and was certified double platinum by the Recording Industry of South Africa for shipments of 100,000 copies.

== Accolades and impact ==
"Spinning Around" earned nominations for Best Female Artist and Best Pop Release at the 2000 ARIA Music Awards show, winning the latter. In the following ceremony, Light Years garnered four nominations, winning Minogue's first Best Female Artist and the second-consecutive Best Pop Release, while losing both Highest Selling Album and Album of the Year to Powderfinger's Odyssey Number Five (2000). That same year, "On a Night Like This" was also nominated for Highest Selling Single and Single of the Year. Phonographic Performance Company of Australia recognised Minogue as the seventh-most broadcast artist of 2001, while three tracks from Light Years appeared on the top 100 Most Broadcast Recordings of 2001: "Spinning Around" (number 12), "On a Night Like This" (number 15), and "Kids" (number 163).

Music critics recognised Light Years for reviving Minogue's career and reestablishing her to the public. The music video for "Spinning Around" led to her bottom and the revealing hotpants gaining extensive coverage in the media, referring to it as one of her trademark looks. Jaelani Turner-Williams of Stereogum and Clarke credited the album for introducing a more sophisticated side of disco-pop for the new century. Minogue went on to make six more studio albums with Parlophone until 2016, her longest label residency after Mushroom Records.

Critics also highlighted Light Years' impact on the music scene. Cinquemani stated house tracks "On a Night Like This" and "Butterfly" predicted the rise of EDM music and created the template for Minogue's releases over the next 15 years. True commented Minogue is finally comfortable with who she is and praised the album as one of the best disco records since the 1970s. A reviewer from Sputnikmusic credited the album for bringing nu-disco to the public, predicting the direction for her later releases, and influencing pop projects for two decades—namely Madonna's Confessions on a Dance Floor (2005), Arcade Fire's Reflektor (2013), and Carly Rae Jepsen's "Julien" (2019). In a 2010 article, Karina Halle of Consequence noted Minogue's flamboyant musical style has been passed down to contemporary pop artists like Lady Gaga.

== Track listing ==
Light Years – Standard version
No.	Title	Writer(s)	Producer(s)	Length
0.	"Password" (hidden pregap track)	Kylie Minogue; Johnny Douglas	Douglas	3:50
1.	"Spinning Around"	Ira Shickman; Osborne Bingham; Kara DioGuardi; Paula Abdul	Mike Spencer; 7th District^{[a]}; Big G.^{[b]}	3:27
2.	"On a Night Like This"	Steve Torch; Graham Stack; Mark Taylor; Brian Rawling	Stack; Taylor	3:33
3.	"So Now Goodbye"	Minogue; Steve Anderson	Douglas	3:37
4.	"Disco Down"	Douglas	Douglas	3:57
5.	"Loveboat"	Minogue; Guy Chambers; Robbie Williams	Chambers; Steve Power	4:10
6.	"Koocachoo"	Minogue; Douglas	Douglas	4:00
7.	"Your Disco Needs You"	Minogue; Chambers; Williams	Chambers; Power	3:33
8.	"Please Stay"	Minogue; Richard Stannard; Julian Gallagher; John Themis	Richard "Biff" Stannard; Gallagher	4:08
9.	"Bittersweet Goodbye"	Minogue; Anderson	Anderson	3:43
10.	"Butterfly"	Minogue; Anderson	Mark Picchiotti	4:09
11.	"Under the Influence of Love"	Paul Politi; Barry Eugene White	Stannard; Gallagher	3:24
12.	"I'm So High"	Minogue; Chambers; Megan Smith	Chambers; Power	3:33
13.	"Kids" (with Robbie Williams)	Williams; Chambers	Chambers; Power	4:20
14.	"Light Years"	Minogue; Stannard; Gallagher	Stannard; Gallagher	4:47
Total length:				58:16

Light Years – Japanese edition bonus track
No.	Title	Writer(s)	Producer(s)	Length
15.	"Your Disco Needs You" (Japanese version)	Minogue; Chambers; Williams	Chambers; Power	3:33
16.	"Password" (hidden track)	Minogue; Douglas	Douglas	3:50

Light Years – Spanish edition bonus track
No.	Title	Writer(s)	Producer(s)	Length
15.	"Your Disco Needs You" (Spanish version)	Minogue; Chambers; Williams	Chambers; Power	3:33
16.	"Password" (hidden track)	Minogue; Douglas	Douglas	3:50

Light Years – German edition bonus track
No.	Title	Writer(s)	Producer(s)	Length
15.	"Your Disco Needs You" (German version)	Minogue; Chambers; Williams	Chambers; Power	3:33
16.	"Password" (hidden track)	Minogue; Douglas	Douglas	3:50

Light Years – Special tour edition bonus disc
No.	Title	Writer(s)	Producer(s)	Length
1.	"Spinning Around" (7th District Club Mix)	Shickman; Bingham; DioGuardi; Abdul	Spencer; Lorenzo Al Dino Pizzileo^{[a]}; Sergio Flores^{[a]}	6:33
2.	"Spinning Around" (Sharp Vocal Mix)	Shickman; Bingham; DioGuardi; Abdul	Spencer; Pizzileo^{[a]}; Flores^{[a]}; The Sharp Boys^{[a]}	7:04
3.	"On a Night Like This" (Rob Searle Mix)	Torch; Stack; Taylor; Rawling	Stack; Taylor; Rob Searle^{[a]}	7:58
4.	"On a Night Like This" (Bini & Martini Club Mix)	Torch; Stack; Taylor; Rawling	Stack; Taylor; Bini & Martini^{[a]}	6:33
5.	"Please Stay" (Hatiras Dreamy Dub Mix)	Minogue; Stannard; Gallagher; Themis	Stannard; Gallagher; Hatiras^{[a]}	7:02
6.	"Please Stay" (7th District Radio Mix)	Minogue; Stannard; Gallagher; Themis	Stannard; Gallagher; Pizzileo^{[a]}; Flores^{[a]}	4:00
7.	"Please Stay" (7th District Club Flava Mix)	Minogue; Stannard; Gallagher; Themis	Stannard; Gallagher; Pizzileo^{[a]}; Flores^{[a]}	6:33
8.	"Butterfly" (Sandstorm Dub)	Minogue; Anderson	Picchiotti	9:03
9.	"Your Disco Needs You" (Casino Mix)	Minogue; Chambers; Williams	Chambers; Power; Casino Brothers^{[a]}	3:38

Light Years – Australian tour limited edition bonus disc
No.	Title	Writer(s)	Producer(s)	Length
1.	"Spinning Around" (7th District Club Mix)	Shickman; Bingham; DioGuardi; Abdul	Spencer; Pizzileo^{[a]}; Flores^{[a]}	6:33
2.	"Spinning Around" (Sharp Vocal Mix)	Shickman; Bingham; DioGuardi; Abdul	Spencer; Pizzileo^{[a]}; Flores^{[a]}	7:04
3.	"On a Night Like This" (Rob Searle Mix)	Torch; Stack; Taylor; Rawling	Stack; Taylor; Searle^{[a]}	7:58
4.	"On a Night Like This" (Bini & Martini Club Mix)	Torch; Stack; Taylor; Rawling	Stack; Taylor; Bini & Martini^{[a]}	6:33
5.	"On a Night Like This" (Bini & Martini Dub Mix)	Torch; Stack; Taylor; Rawling	Stack; Taylor; Bini & Martini^{[a]}	6:34
6.	"Please Stay" (Hatiras Dreamy Dub Mix)	Minogue; Stannard; Gallagher; Themis	Stannard; Gallagher; Hatiras^{[a]}	7:02
7.	"Please Stay" (Metro Mix)	Minogue; Stannard; Gallagher; Themis	Stannard; Gallagher; Metro^{[a]}	5:50
8.	"Please Stay" (7th District Club Flava Mix)	Minogue; Stannard; Gallagher; Themis	Stannard; Gallagher; Pizzileo^{[a]}; Flores^{[a]}	6:33
9.	"Butterfly" (Sandstorm Dub)	Minogue; Anderson	Picchiotti	9:03
10.	"Your Disco Needs You" (Casino Radio Mix)	Minogue; Chambers; Williams	Chambers; Power; Casino Brothers^{[a]}	3:38
11.	"Physical"	Steve Kipner; Terry Shaddick	Alexis Smith; Josh Abrahams; Marius de Vries	4:42

Notes

- ^{^[a]} signifies an additional producer
- ^{^[b]} signifies an additional vocal producer
- "On a Night Like This" is a cover of the 1999 song of the same name, written by Steve Torch, Graham Stack, Mark Taylor and Brian Rawling, as performed by Pandora.
- "Under the Influence of Love" is a cover of "I'm Under the Influence of Love" (1967), written by Paul Politi and Barry White, as performed by Felice Taylor.
- "Physical" is a cover of the 1981 song of the same name, written by Steve Kipner and Terry Shaddick, as performed by Olivia Newton-John.

== Personnel ==
Credits adapted from the liner notes of Light Years.

=== Recording locations ===
- Metropolis Studios, London (tracks 5, 7, 12)
- Angel, London (tracks 5, 7)
- Blah St., Hampshire, England (tracks 5, 12)
- Studio 2, Dublin (tracks 8, 11, 14)
- Olympic, London (track 9)
- Real World, Box, England (track 9)
- Therapy, London (track 9)
- Master Rock, London (track 13)
- Sarm Hook End, London (track 13)

=== Musicians ===
- Kylie Minogue – lead vocals (all tracks); backing vocals (tracks 1, 4–7, 12)
- Big G. – additional guitar (track 1)
- I.Khan – backing vocals (track 1)
- Johnny Douglas – beats (tracks 3, 4, 6); keyboards, guitar (tracks 4, 6); backing vocals (track 6)
- Dave Clews – keyboards (tracks 3, 4, 6); programming (tracks 3, 4)
- Alan Ross – guitar (track 3)
- Simon Hale – strings, horn arrangement (tracks 3, 4); keyboards, string arrangements, conducting (track 11)
- Andy Caine – backing vocals (track 4); male choir (tracks 5, 7)
- Miriam Stockley – backing vocals (track 4)
- Gavyn Wright – orchestra leader (tracks 4, 9)
- Steve McNichol – programming (tracks 5, 7, 12)
- Andy Duncan – drum programming (tracks 5, 7, 12, 13); percussion (track 5)
- Tracy Ackerman – backing vocals (tracks 5, 7, 12)
- Phil Spalding – bass guitar (tracks 5, 7, 12); fuzz bass (track 13) electric rhythm guitar and wah-wah (track 5)
- Guy Chambers – keyboards (tracks 5, 7, 12, 13); (track 5); piano (track 7); electric guitar, acoustic guitar, electric sitar (track 12); arrangement (track 13)
- Lance Ellington – male choir (tracks 5, 7)
- Rick Driscoll – male choir (tracks 5, 7)
- Clive Griffith – male choir (tracks 5, 7)
- Pete Howarth – male choir (tracks 5, 7)
- Mick Mullins – male choir (tracks 5, 7)
- Dan Russell – male choir (tracks 5, 7)
- Jon Savannah – male choir (tracks 5, 7)
- Tony Walthers – male choir (tracks 5, 7)
- Carl Wayne – male choir (tracks 5, 7)
- Paul Turner – bass, guitars (track 6)
- Robbie Williams – backing vocals (track 7)
- Sharon Murphy – backing vocals (tracks 8, 11, 14)
- John Themis – guitars (track 8)
- Wil Malone – orchestra arrangement, conducting (track 9)
- The London Session Orchestra – orchestra (track 9)
- Craig J. Snider – additional keyboards (track 10)
- Dem Girlz – backing vocals (track 10)
- Natural – guitars, additional arrangements (track 10)
- Kraig McCreary – guitars (track 10)
- Resin Rubbers – strings (track 10)
- Paul Mertens – flute (track 10)
- Dave Sears – additional arrangements (track 10)
- Steve Lewinson – bass (track 11)
- Steve Power – additional keyboards (track 12)
- Robbie Williams – vocals (track 13)
- Winston Blissett – bass guitar (track 13)
- Neil Taylor – guitars (track 13)
- Chris Sharrock – percussion (track 13)
- Gary Nuttall – backing vocals (track 13)
- Katie Kissoon – backing vocals (track 13)
- Sylvia Mason-James – backing vocals (track 13)
- Tessa Niles – backing vocals (track 13)
- Paul "Tubbs" Williams – backing vocals (track 13)
- Claire Worrall – backing vocals (track 13)
- Biff – backing vocals (track 14)

=== Technical ===
- Mike Spencer – production (track 1)
- 7th District – additional production, mix (track 1)
- Big G. – additional vocal production, engineering, mixing, mastering (track 1)
- Graham Stack – production, mixing (track 2)
- Mark Taylor – production, mixing (track 2)
- Johnny Douglas – production (tracks 3, 4, 6)
- Ren Swan – engineering, mixing (tracks 3, 4, 6)
- Tom Hannen – engineering assistance, mixing assistance (tracks 3, 4, 6)
- Guy Chambers – production (tracks 5, 7, 12, 13)
- Steve Power – production, mixing (tracks 5, 7, 12, 13); engineering (tracks 5, 7, 12)
- Tony Cousins – mastering (tracks 5, 13)
- Richard "Biff" Stannard – production (tracks 8, 11, 14)
- Julian Gallagher – production (tracks 8, 11, 14)
- Ash Howes – recording, mixing (tracks 8, 11, 14)
- Alvin Sweeney – recording assistance, mixing assistance (tracks 8, 11, 14)
- Dave McCracken – Pro Tools (tracks 8, 14)
- Steve Anderson – production (track 9)
- Adam Brown – recording, mixing (track 9)
- Mark Picchiotti – production, mixing (track 10)
- Tom Carlisle – mix engineering (track 10)
- Pete Davis – Pro Tools (track 11)
- Richard Woodcraft – additional engineering (track 13)
- Savvas Iossifidis – additional engineering (track 13)
- Dave Naughton – mix engineering assistance (track 13)
- Richard Flack – Pro Tools (track 13)
- Jim Brumby – Pro Tools (track 13)

=== Artwork ===
- Vincent Peters – photography
- Farrow Design – design

== Charts ==
=== Weekly charts ===
Chart performance for Light Years in 2000–01
Chart (2000–2001)	Peak position
Australian Albums (ARIA)	1
Belgian Albums (Ultratop Flanders)	44
Dutch Albums (Album Top 100)	71
European Albums (Music & Media)	10
Finnish Albums (Suomen virallinen lista)	24
French Albums (SNEP)	50
German Albums (Offizielle Top 100)	35
Greek Albums (IFPI)	9
Hungarian Albums (MAHASZ)	16
Irish Albums (IRMA)	13
New Zealand Albums (RMNZ)	8
Polish Albums (ZPAV)	33
Russian Albums (InterMedia)	10
Scottish Albums (OCC)	3
Singaporean Albums (SPVA)	4
South African Albums (RISA)	11
Swedish Albums (Sverigetopplistan)	25
Swiss Albums (Schweizer Hitparade)	28
UK Albums (OCC)	2

Chart performance for Light Years in 2018
Chart (2018)	Peak position
Scottish Albums (OCC)	21
UK Albums (OCC)	36

=== Year-end charts ===
2000 year-end chart performance for Light Years
Chart (2000)	Position
Australian Albums (ARIA)	17
UK Albums (OCC)	58

2001 year-end chart performance for Light Years
Chart (2001)	Position
Australian Albums (ARIA)	17
UK Albums (OCC)	156

2002 year-end chart performance for Light Years
Chart (2002)	Position
UK Albums (OCC)	165

=== Decade-end charts ===
2000s decade-end chart performance for Light Years
Chart (2000–2009)	Position
Australian Albums (ARIA)	69

== Certifications and sales ==
Certification and sales for Light Years
Region	Certification	Certified units/sales
Australia (ARIA)	4× Platinum	280,000^{^}
South Africa (RISA)	2× Platinum	100,000^{*}
United Kingdom (BPI)	Platinum	508,739
^{*} Sales figures based on certification alone.^{^} Shipments figures based on certification alone.

== Release history ==
Release dates and formats for Light Years
Region	Date	Format(s)	Label(s)	Ref(s).
Australia	22 September 2000	CD; cassette	Mushroom	
United Kingdom	25 September 2000	CD; cassette	Parlophone	
Germany	25 September 2000	CD; cassette	Parlophone	
Spain	25 September 2000	CD; cassette	EMI	
Japan	25 September 2000	CD; cassette	EMI	
Canada	26 September 2000	CD	EMI	
United Kingdom	4 March 2001	2CD	Parlophone	
Australia	4 March 2001	2CD	Mushroom	
Japan	2003	CD	EMI	
Japan	2007	CD	EMI	
Japan	1 July 2009	CD	EMI; Warner Music Japan	
Japan	2011	CD	EMI	
United Kingdom	2018	LP	BMG	
Various	7 August 2026	2×LP reissue	Parlophone	

== See also ==
- List of number-one albums of 2000 (Australia)
- List of UK top-ten albums in 2000
- List of top 25 albums for 2000 in Australia
- List of top 25 albums for 2001 in Australia
- List of best-selling albums of the 2000s in Australia
- List of albums with tracks hidden in the pregap
