= The Kylie Tapes: 94–98 =

1998 video by Kylie Minogue

Video by Kylie Minogue
- Released: August 1998
- Recorded: 1994–1998
- Studio: Various
- Genre: Pop; indie pop; pop rock; Britpop
- Length: 25:19
- Label: Mushroom
- Director: Kieran Evans; Pedro Romhanyi; David Mould; Paul Boyd; Keir McFarlane
- Producer: Kylie Minogue; Dave Ball; Ingo Vauk; Brothers in Rhythm; James Dean Bradfield; Dave Eringa; Owain Barton; Jimmy Harry

Kylie Minogue chronology
Greatest Video Hits (1992)	The Kylie Tapes: 94–98 (1998)	Live in Sydney (2001)

The Kylie Tapes: 94–98 is the VHS release by Australian singer-songwriter Kylie Minogue. It was released exclusively in Australia by Mushroom Records and Roadshow Entertainment in August 1998. It contains her videography from her two records with Deconstruction Records, Kylie Minogue and Impossible Princess between 1994 and 1998. The album cover art was taken by British photographer Simon Emmett, the same shot and design was also used for Minogue's fourth remix album Impossible Remixes.

== Track listing ==
No.	Title	Director(s)	Length
1.	"Breathe"	Kieran Evans	3:36
2.	"Did It Again"	Pedro Romhanyi	3:47
3.	"Some Kind of Bliss"	David Mould	3:39
4.	"Confide in Me"	Paul Boyd	5:59
5.	"Where Is the Feeling?"	Keir McFarlane	4:08
6.	"Put Yourself in My Place"	McFarlane	4:10
Total length:			25:19

== Release history ==
Release dates and formats for The Kylie Tapes: 94–98
Region	Date	Format(s)	Cat. no.	Label(s)	Ref(s).
Australia	August 1998	OZ VHS	101623	Mushroom	

== Charts ==
Chart performance for The Kylie Tapes: 94–98
Chart (1998)	Peak position
UK Music Videos (OCC)	37 (Note: peaked in the second week.)

== Personnel ==
Adapted from the video album's liner notes.

Music video

- Lynette Loris – producer (track 1)
- Gareth Francis – producer (track 2)
- Simon Poon Tip – producer (track 3)
- Michael Kahn – producer (track 4)
- Tima Surmelioglu – producer (track 5)
- Fiona Forsythe – producer (track 6)

Music

- Kylie Minogue – vocals, writer (tracks 1–3), producer (track 2)
- Dave Ball – writer, producer (track 1)
- Ingo Vauk – writer, producer (track 1)
- Steve Anderson – writer (tracks 2, 4)
- Dave Seaman – writer (tracks 2, 4)
- Brothers in Rhythm – producer (tracks 2, 4, 5)
- James Dean Bradfield – writer, producer (track 3)
- Sean Moore – writer (track 3)
- Dave Eringa – producer (track 3)
- Owain Barton – producer (track 4)
- Wilf Smarties – writer (track 5)
- Jayn Hanna – writer (track 5)
- Jimmy Harry – writer, producer (track 6)

Art

- Andrew Murabito – design
- Simon Emmett – photography
