= Please Stay (Kylie Minogue song) =

2000 single by Kylie Minogue

Single by Kylie Minogue

from the album Light Years
- B-side: "Santa Baby"; "Good Life"
- Released: 11 December 2000
- Studio: Studio 2 (Dublin, Ireland)
- Genre: Latin pop; disco
- Length: 4:06
- Label: Festival Mushroom; Parlophone
- Songwriters: Kylie Minogue; Richard Stannard; Julian Gallagher; John Themis
- Producers: Richard "Biff" Stannard; Julian Gallagher

Kylie Minogue singles chronology
| "Kids" (2000) | "Please Stay" (2000) | "Your Disco Needs You" (2001) |

Music video
- "Please Stay" on YouTube

"Please Stay" is a song by Australian singer and songwriter Kylie Minogue for her seventh studio album, Light Years (2000). The song was written by Minogue, Richard Stannard, Julian Gallagher, and John Themis and was produced by Stannard and Gallagher. Festival Mushroom Records and Parlophone released the song as the fourth single from Light Years on 11 December 2000. "Please Stay" is a disco song with a strong Latin pop influence. The song received generally positive reviews from music critics.

Commercially, the song peaked at number 10 in the United Kingdom and number 15 in Minogue's native Australia, where it was certified gold by the Australian Recording Industry Association (ARIA), selling over 35,000 copies. An accompanying music video was shot for the single, directed by James Frost and Alex Smith. It featured Minogue abandoning a bedroom to visit a group of partygoers in an underground room. The song has been performed live by Minogue on her KylieFever2002 and Showgirl: The Greatest Hits Tour shows.

== Background ==
"Please Stay" was written by Kylie Minogue, Richard Stannard, Julian Gallagher, and John Themis and was produced by Stannard and Gallagher. The song was chosen as the fourth single from Light Years. "Please Stay" is a disco song, which features a strong Latin-pop style.

== Reception ==
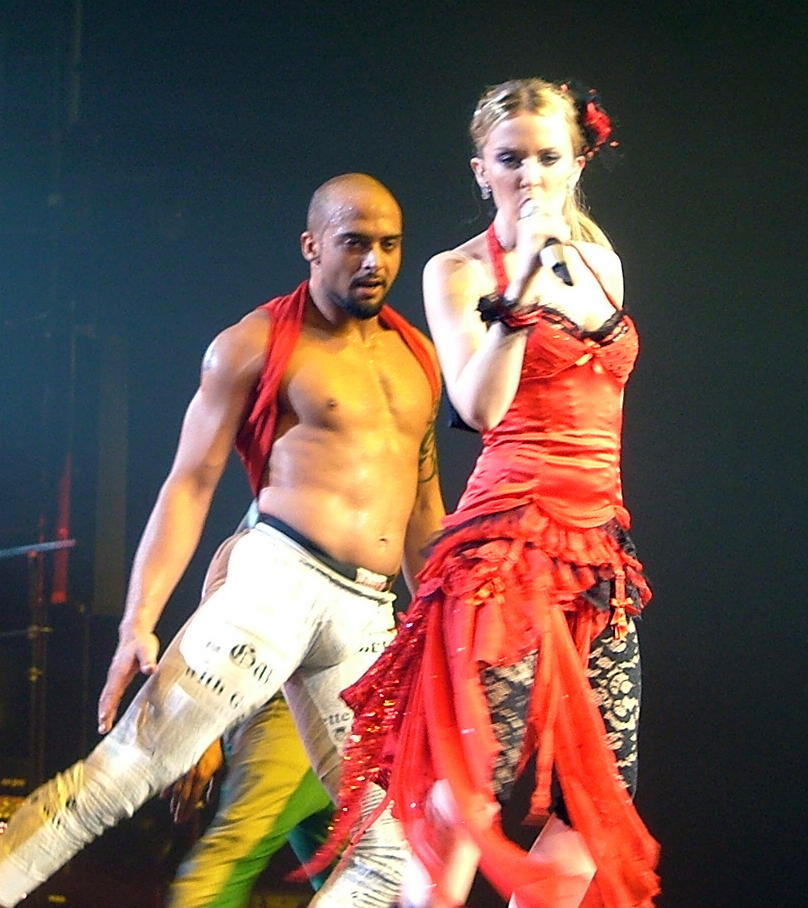
Minogue performing "Please Stay" during Showgirl: The Greatest Hits Tour (2005)

Peter Robinson from NME praised the song for being a "breezy little number, much like Kylie herself." Dooyoo.co.uk also gave it a positive review, writing, "With a slight drift from the camp disco, 'Please Stay' indulges in a light, fast acoustic sound, backed up by a thumping beat and lauded by soothing, inviting vocals from Minogue...she draws you into it and makes you feel like you're strutting the romantic streets of Paris."

"Please Stay" saw moderate success worldwide. The song debuted at No. 15 in Minogue’s native Australia, but did not remain on the charts for long; however, the song was certified gold by the Australian Recording Industry of Australia (ARIA). The song debuted at No. 69 on the Dutch charts, but fell-out the next week at No. 77. The song debuted at No. 47 in Sweden, staying on the charts for three weeks. The song peaked at No. 10 on the UK Singles Chart (one of its higher positions), but did not go further; ”Please Stay” remained on the British charts for seven weeks.

== Music video ==
A music video was shot by James Frost and Alex Smith. The clip opens with Minogue driving a car through the night, intercut with images of her lying on a round rotating bed whilst wearing a gold silk mini-dress with slashed sleeves. After the first chorus, Minogue gets up off the bed in order to pull on a candelabra, revealing the opening to a fireman's pole within the wall. Sliding down it, she comes out the other side into an underground room filled with partygoers, and her gold dress changed into an identical red one. Minogue commences a dance routine with the partygoers involving a pool table, until the clip fades out over images of a pinball machine featuring the "Light Years" album cover.

== Live performances ==
Minogue performed a medley of "Spinning Around" and "Please Stay" on the Royal Variety Performance, which aired on 17 December 2000 by BBC One. She performed "Please Stay" on the KylieFever2002 tour, as part of the "In Your Eyes" medley which included the titular song and "Rhythm of the Night". It was included again on the setlist of her Showgirl: The Greatest Hits Tour in 2005 as part of the What Kylie Wants, Kylie Gets section. Minogue was unable to complete the tour as she was diagnosed with early breast cancer and had to cancel the Australian leg of the tour. The performance of the song was included in the Showgirl video album (2005).

== Track listings ==
Australasian and UK CD1, UK cassette single

1. "Please Stay"
2. "Santa Baby"
3. "Good Life"

Australasian and UK CD2

1. "Please Stay"
2. "Please Stay" (7th District Club Flava mix)
3. "Please Stay" (Hatiras Dreamy dub)
4. "Please Stay" (video)

European enhanced CD single

1. "Please Stay"
2. "Santa Baby"
3. "Please Stay" (video)

UK 12-inch single

A1. "Please Stay" (7th District club dub)
B1. "Please Stay" (Hatiras Dreamy dub)
B2. "Please Stay" (7th District Club Flava mix)

== Credits and personnel ==
Credits are lifted from the Light Years album booklet.

Studio

- Recorded and mixed at Studio 2 (Dublin, Ireland)

Personnel

- Kylie Minogue – writing, vocals
- Richard Stannard – writing, production
- Julian Gallagher – writing
- John Themis – writing, guitars
- Sharon Murphy – backing vocals
- Ash Howes – recording, mixing
- Alvin Sweeney – recording and mixing assistant
- Dave McCracken – Pro Tools

== Charts ==
| Chart (2000–2001) | Peak position |
|---|---|
| Australia (ARIA) | 15 |
| Australian Dance (ARIA) | 7 |
| Belgium (Ultratip Bubbling Under Flanders) | 10 |
| Belgium (Ultratip Bubbling Under Wallonia) | 13 |
| Croatia International Airplay (HRT) | 4 |
| Europe (Eurochart Hot 100) | 42 |
| Ireland (IRMA) | 34 |
| Netherlands (Single Top 100) | 69 |
| Poland (Polish Airplay Chart) | 16 |
| Scottish Singles Sales (Official Charts) | 10 |
| Sweden (Sverigetopplistan) | 47 |
| UK Singles (Official Charts) | 10 |

== Certifications ==
| Region | Certification | Certified units/sales |
|---|---|---|
| Australia (ARIA) | Gold | 35,000^{^} |
^{^} Shipments figures based on certification alone.

== Release history ==
| Region | Date | Format(s) | Label(s) | Ref. |
|---|---|---|---|---|
| Australia | 11 December 2000 | CD | Festival Mushroom | |
| United Kingdom | 11 December 2000 | CD; cassette | Parlophone | |
| New Zealand | 2 April 2001 | CD | Festival Mushroom | |
