= Your Disco Needs You =

2001 single by Kylie Minogue

Single by Kylie Minogue

from the album Light Years
- B-side: "Password"
- Released: 22 January 2001
- Studio: Metropolis (London, England)
- Genre: Dance-pop; disco
- Length: 3:33
- Label: Mushroom; Parlophone
- Songwriters: Kylie Minogue; Guy Chambers; Robbie Williams
- Producers: Guy Chambers; Steve Power

Kylie Minogue singles chronology
"Please Stay" (2000)	"Your Disco Needs You" (2001)	"Can't Get You Out of My Head" (2001)

Music videos
- "Your Disco Needs You" on YouTube; "Your Disco Needs You" (German Almighty Radio Edit) on YouTube

"Your Disco Needs You" is a song by Australian singer and songwriter Kylie Minogue, taken from her seventh studio album Light Years (2000). The song was written by Minogue, Guy Chambers and Robbie Williams and produced by Chambers and Steve Power. Lyrically, "Your Disco Needs You" talks about the power of disco music.

The song peaked inside the top forty in Australia, Switzerland and Germany. Hugely popular as an album track, it was never released as a single in the United Kingdom because the song was considered "too gay" and "too camp", but charted at number 152 on the basis of import sales. Minogue has also performed the song on most of her 2000 and onward tours, including On a Night Like This Tour, Showgirl: The Greatest Hits Tour, KylieX2008, For You, For Me Tour, Kiss Me Once Tour, and most recently on her Kylie Summer 2015 Tour.

== Background and composition ==
The lack of a single release for the track in the United Kingdom caused controversy among fans there, sparking protests outside her UK record company lobbying for this to happen. When considering the fourth single to be released from Light Years, Minogue's record label chose the Latin-sounding "Please Stay" instead of "Your Disco Needs You", due to the song's campness and to avoid Minogue being further stereotyped, although remixers Almighty had remixed the song and this version appeared on the UK CD single of "On a Night Like This".

According to Harald Peters from German newspaper Berliner Zeitung, in the song "she gives a fiery speech. Assuming that the pleasure of dancing in the sense of the French Revolution represents freedom, equality and fraternity, she urges the listeners in French: 'You are never alone! / You know what to do! / Do not abandon your nation / The disco needs you!'". Heather Phares from AllMusic described the "German Almighty Radio Edit" song as a "Four-on-the-floor beat" and said that "Your Disco Needs You" was a surprisingly good "dance-oriented song". NME compared the song to the Pet Shop Boys' "Go West".

== Reception ==
=== Critical response ===
"Your Disco Needs You" received critical acclaim from most music critics. Heather Phares from AllMusic gave the song a separate review, while giving it 3/5 stars. She described "Your Disco Needs You" as “glittery charm as well as a fun hidden song that's arguably more enjoyable than the title track.” For the album review of Light Years (2000), Chris True highlighted the song as an album standout. He said "Your Disco Needs You" is “probably one of the best dance songs of the '90s. Arguably one of the best disco records since the '70s.” Nick Levine from Digital Spy said if the song "doesn't put a smile on your face you need a new shrink". The song appeared on a compilation titled Rainbow Love Boat, which was reviewed by AllMusic, with Bradley Torreano writing that songs like "Your Disco Needs You" are “genuinely fun, exciting songs that may not be lyrical triumphs, but that fact is of little importance in the genre.”

=== Chart performance ===
"Your Disco Needs You" had limited success, due to being released in Germany and receiving a limited release in Australia. The song debuted at number twenty on the Australian ARIA singles chart, becoming the second-highest debut of the week, before descending to number forty-five the next week.

== Music video ==
The original music video was filmed in 2000 in Los Angeles, featuring the “Casino Radio & Club Remix” of the song. The video begins with visual references to “Suspended in Time” by Olivia Newton-John, and the 1980 film Xanadu, and pays homage to the discothèques of the 1970s. The video features an endless array of identical Minogue clones, with references to the 1934 film Dames (with the Busby Berkeley-like formations, and Minogue's head popping-through at the end). Throughout the video, the Minogue clones wear a variety of costumes, such as an Uncle Sam, stars and stripes, American-inspired outfit accessorised with a black leather cane and whip. In another look, she wears a black-and-white striped dress with a black leather beret.

An alternate video was filmed and released to the German market, featuring clips of Minogue against a backdrop of balloons and gold streamers while wearing a black-and-gold "Your Disco Needs You" T-shirt, as seen on the CD single's front cover. The alternate version was made due to Minogue's dissatisfaction with elements of the original video; however, over time, this video has fallen out-of-favour in comparison to the original.

== Formats and track listings ==
- Australian CD single
1. "Your Disco Needs You" – 3:34
2. "Your Disco Needs You" (Almighty radio edit) – 3:30
3. "Your Disco Needs You" (Almighty remix) – 8:20
4. "Your Disco Needs You" (Casino radio & club mix) – 3:40
5. "Your Disco Needs You" (German album version) – 3:31
6. "Password" – 3:49
- European CD single and digital download 1
1. "Your Disco Needs You" (Casino radio & club mix) – 3:40
2. "Your Disco Needs You" (UK album version) – 3:31
3. "Your Disco Needs You" (Almighty remix) – 8:20
4. "Please Stay" (7th District Club Flava mix) – 6:32
- Digital download 2
1. "Your Disco Needs You" – 3:34
2. "Your Disco Needs You" (German Almighty radio edit) – 3:29
3. "Your Disco Needs You" (Almighty mix) – 8:20
4. "Your Disco Needs You" (German version) / "Password" – 8:49

== Charts ==
Chart (2001)	Peak position
Australia (ARIA)	20
Austria (Ö3 Austria Top 40)	70
Croatia International Airplay (HRT)	7
Europe (Eurochart Hot 100)	97
Germany (GfK)	31
Poland Airplay (Music & Media)	7
Poland (Polish Airplay Charts)	30
Switzerland (Schweizer Hitparade)	27
UK Singles (OCC)	152

== Sales ==
Region	Certification	Certified units/sales
United Kingdom	—	20,000

== Release history ==
Region	Date	Format(s)	Label(s)	Ref(s).
Europe	22 January 2001	CD	Parlophone	
Australia	26 March 2001	CD	Mushroom	

== Cover versions ==
Russian-Bulgarian singer Philipp Kirkorov used the music for his song "Моя песня" (My Song), but with different lyrics.

In 2008, the Randy Jones cover was released on his album Ticket to the World.
