= UK Video Charts =

UK music video chart

The UK Video Charts is a group of charts compiled by the Official Charts Company on behalf of The British Association for Screen Entertainment. The charts are based on weekly DVD and Blu-ray sales in 6,500 retailers across the UK; they formerly included VHS sales before that format died out in the 2000s. The main chart combines the sales of all video sales in the UK and trades under the name of the Combined Video Chart. There are also charts for the sales of music videos (Music Video Chart) and children's videos, among others. All of the charts are published on the OCC's website.

== Charts ==
| Chart title | Description |
|---|---|
| Official Video Chart | Ranks the sales of video releases based on collective amounts of units sold per week across the UK. |
| Official Film Chart | Ranks the sales of films based on their combined DVD, Blu-ray and digital download sales. |
| Official DVD Chart | Compiled by the Official Charts Company, the UK's biggest DVDs of the week. |
| Official Blu-ray Chart | Ranks the weekly sales of Blu-ray discs in the UK. |
| Official Children's Video Chart | Ranks the weekly sales of children's video formats in the UK. |
| Official Film on Disc Chart | Ranks the weekly sales of films in the UK based on overall disc sales. |
| Official Music Video Chart | Chart based purely on the UK's biggest music videos of the week, based on sales of DVDs, Blu-rays and other physical formats. |
| Official TV on Video Chart | Ranks the weekly sales of television programmes or series on video formats in the UK. |

== See also ==
- UK Music Charts
