= Spinning Around =

2000 single by Kylie Minogue

Single by Kylie Minogue

from the album Light Years
- B-side: "Cover Me with Kisses"; "Paper Dolls"
- Released: 19 June 2000
- Recorded: January 2000
- Studio: Cello (Los Angeles)
- Genre: Dance-pop; disco; synth-pop
- Length: 3:27
- Label: Mushroom; Parlophone
- Songwriters: Ira Shickman; Osborne Bingham; Kara DioGuardi; Paula Abdul
- Producer: Mike Spencer

Kylie Minogue singles chronology
"Cowboy Style" (1998)	"Spinning Around" (2000)	"On a Night Like This" (2000)

Music video
- "Spinning Around" on YouTube

"Spinning Around" is a song by Australian singer Kylie Minogue for her seventh studio album, Light Years (2000). Written by Ira Shickman, Osborne Bingham, Kara DioGuardi and Paula Abdul, the song was initially meant to be recorded by Abdul for her own album, but was given to Minogue after the plan never came to fruition. Produced by Mike Spencer, the disco-influenced dance-pop song was then released in Australia and the UK as the lead single from Light Years on 19 June 2000, through Mushroom Records and Parlophone. Lyrically, the song addresses the theme of reinvention, with Minogue claiming that she has changed as a person and learned from the past.

Upon its release, "Spinning Around" received favourable reviews from music critics, who singled it out as one of the highlights from the album and praised Minogue for returning to her signature musical style. Commercially, the single was a success and became Minogue's "comeback" single following the critical and commercial disappointment of her previous album Impossible Princess (1997). It entered the Australian Singles Chart at number one, becoming Minogue's first chart-topper since "Confide in Me" in 1994. The single also debuted at number one in the United Kingdom, where it became her first single to peak atop the chart since "Tears on My Pillow" in 1990. Elsewhere, it reached the top five in several countries, including Croatia, Czech Republic, Ireland, New Zealand and Russia. "Spinning Around" was certified platinum in Australia and the United Kingdom. The song won the 2000 ARIA Music Award for "Best Pop Release".

The accompanying music video for "Spinning Around", directed by Dawn Shadforth, features Minogue dancing and enjoying herself at a nightclub. It became popular for the gold hotpants she sported in most of the scenes and led to her bottom gaining extensive coverage from the media. The hotpants are considered to be "iconic" and have been displayed in exhibitions of Minogue's fashion. "Spinning Around" has been performed by Minogue during all of her tours, with the exception of the Anti Tour. In 2003, Q magazine ranked "Spinning Around" at number 90 in their list of the "1001 Best Songs Ever".

== Background and recording ==
In 1997, Minogue released her sixth studio album, Impossible Princess. The album represented a drastic change in the singer's musical direction, shifting from her signature dance-pop styles to incorporate elements of electronica and pop rock. It was her second album to be released on British record label Deconstruction and became a success in her native Australia, peaking at number four on the ARIA Albums Chart. In the United Kingdom Impossible Princess was less successful than Minogue's previous albums and peaked at number ten on the UK Albums Chart. The album also suffered from poor reviews in the UK as commentators criticised its different musical approach; many also considered that Minogue's career was over. Despite embarking on a successful promotional tour, Minogue was dropped by Deconstruction in 1999. Minogue then signed to Parlophone, another British record label.

After various discussions, Minogue decided to do what she did "best" and record a simple pop album inspired by disco and Europop, entitled Light Years. "Spinning Around" was included as the opening track of the album and was written by Ira Shickman, Osborne Bingham, Kara DioGuardi and Paula Abdul, and produced by Mike Spencer. Abdul had based the song on her divorce from clothing designer Brad Beckerman and had originally intended to record it for her own studio album, but it was given to Minogue after the album failed to materialise. The song was the first major songwriting project for DioGuardi, who had not been offered any notable projects previously. In an interview discussing the development of Light Years, Minogue revealed that the song had initially been found as a demo in New York by her A&R executive Jamie Nelson, who believed it would be "perfect" for the singer. After listening to the demo, Minogue agreed to record it and felt the song had the potential to be a hit. "Spinning Around" was then released as the lead single from the album on 19 June 2000 in both Australia and the United Kingdom.

== Composition ==
"Spinning Around" (2000)
19-second sample of the chorus of "Spinning Around". The dance-pop track contains prominent instrumentation from string instruments.

Similar to most of the songs from Light Years, "Spinning Around" is a "string-laden" dance-pop track with prominent influences from disco music. According to the sheet music of the song published by BMG Rights Management at Musicnotes.com, it is composed in the key of F♯ minor and features a moderate tempo of 120 beats per minute. Minogue's vocal range spans from the low note of F_{3} to the high note of C_{5}. Addressing the theme of reinvention, the lyrics declare that Minogue has changed and learned from her past mistakes; it contains lines like "I'm spinning around/Move out of my way ... I'm not the same" and "Mistakes that I made have given me the strength to really believe." In an analysis of the lyrics of the song, Pom Avoledo from Blogcritics wrote that Minogue demands attention in the chorus towards the changes in her personality and asserts that people appreciate them, in the line "I know you're feelin[g] me [be]cause you like it like this." The first verse deals with Minogue ridding herself of items and symbols from her past and starting afresh, evidenced in lines like "Threw away my old clothes, got myself a better wardrobe." The critic felt that in the second verse Minogue faces her mistakes and accepts herself as she is. The bridge of the song features the repetition of the hook "You know you like it like this," with Minogue's voice being vocoded. Chris True from AllMusic felt that through the lyrics, Minogue was admitting that releasing Impossible Princess in 1997 was not the best decision.

== Critical reaction ==
"Spinning Around" received favourable reviews from music critics. Chris True from AllMusic selected it as a highlight from the album and said it was a "fun and string-laden declaration that she may have made a mistake back in 1997." Pom Avoledo praised Minogue for returning to her signature dance-pop style and complimented her for giving "Spinning Around" an "air of elegance and sensuality which was lacking in her early material." A very positive review came from Siobhan Grogan of NME, who favoured the chorus of the song and commended Minogue for coming back to "what she knows best." The critic felt the song would become a hit in gay clubs and commented that "[Spinning Around] is made of the same fizzing, giddy disco-pop that made Kylie famous in the first place." Gary Crossing from Yahoo! Music, who gave Light Years a mixed review, felt that "Spinning Around" was one of the better tracks from the album and called it a "slinky little number." Olive Pometsey from GQ deemed it one of Minogue's most "iconic" tracks, concluding that "from the funky bass to those gold shorts, our pop queen did not return to the charts to play; she came to reign".

In his review of Minogue's 2004 greatest hits album Ultimate Kylie, Jason Shawahn from About.com praised the inclusion of songs like "Spinning Around" and other tracks from Light Years, calling them "a blessing for domestic music consumers, since that disc has never found its way onto official US release, though with any collection of Minogue hits, one simply has to look at what they have in their collection versus what they don't." At the 14th ARIA Music Awards ceremony in 2000, "Spinning Around" won the award for "Best Pop Release". Billboard's Jason Lipshutz wrote the track found the singer "returning to straightforward pop after 1997's ambitious Impossible Princess and corralling some disco thump to create an especially giddy effect"; calling it one of Minogue's "most effortless hits to date". Louis Vartel from the LGBT-oriented website NewNownext, called it her "coolest, most liberated dance opus". He placed it at number seven of his list of the singer's 48 greatest songs, in honour of her 48th birthday. Writing for the Herald Sun, Cameron Adams ranked it at number 42 on his list of the singer's best songs, in honour of her 50th birthday and said: "Remember at the time many thought Kylie was washed-up, so a 70s-soaked disco pop tune was the ideal way to recalibrate the good ship Minogue. It worked, with a little help from some very little hungry gold hotpants", the last part being a reference to the song's music video. Alexis Petridis from The Guardian ranked it as Minogue's best single, writing that "Kylie was essentially put on this earth to make glitzy, euphoric, balls-out pop bangers, and Spinning Around is the glitziest and most euphoric of the lot. A bold restatement of core values following her 90s dalliances with the left field; a perfect pop-disco nugget, a single only the terminally joyless could fail to enjoy."

== Chart performance ==
The song was a commercial success. In Australia it was certified gold by the Australian Recording Industry Association (ARIA) prior to its release on the strength of pre-orders. On the chart date of 2 July 2000, it debuted at number one on the ARIA Singles Chart. The following week, it dropped to number five and it stayed in the top ten for four consecutive weeks in total. It was Minogue's fifth number-one single in the country, her first since "Confide in Me" (1994). "Spinning Around" charted for a total of 12 weeks and was later certified platinum by the ARIA for shipments of 70,000 units. The song also performed well in New Zealand, entering the RIANZ Singles Chart at number eight and peaking at number two. It spent a total of 17 weeks on the chart and was certified gold by the Recording Industry Association of New Zealand (RIANZ) for sales of 7,500 units.

With first-week sales of over 82,000 units, "Spinning Around" debuted atop the UK Singles Chart on the chart date of 1 July 2000, becoming Minogue's first number-one single in a decade. Her previous chart-topping single was "Tears on My Pillow" from her second studio album Enjoy Yourself (1989). "Spinning Around" was Minogue's fifth number-one single in the United Kingdom. Minogue became one of only two artists to have a number one single in three consecutive decades, achieving this in the 1980s, 1990s, and 2000s. The other artist to hold this distinction is Madonna, whose song "American Pie" topped the UK singles chart in March 2000. "Spinning Around" charted inside the top ten for two weeks and inside the top forty for eight weeks. The British Phonographic Industry (BPI) certified the song platinum for shipments of 600,000 units. As of March 2014, the single has sold 300,000 units in the country according to the Official Charts Company. "Spinning Around" was deemed a successful "comeback" single for Minogue and, along with parent album Light Years, helped relaunch her career.

== Music video ==
=== Development and synopsis ===
Minogue posing on a bar counter in the video wearing the "iconic" gold lamé hotpants

The accompanying music video for "Spinning Around" was directed by Dawn Shadforth. As the song was meant to be Minogue's "comeback" single and mark a "decisive return" to pop music following Impossible Princess, the video did not contain any dark themes and put the "emphasis firmly upon dance, fun, and freedom." The video begins with a shot of Minogue's feet as she enters a disco-like setting. She is then shown dancing on the floor with a man, whom she later flirts with on a sofa. Scenes of her performing a dance routine on and in front of a bar and lying on neon blue and gold lights are interspersed throughout the video. Most of the shots are focused on Minogue's body and various scenes feature her wearing gold lamé hotpants.

=== Legacy ===
I went through years of rejection, and my first thing was Kylie [Minogue recording "Spinning Around" in 2000]. I didn't know who Kylie was, and I was heartbroken that Paula Abdul wasn't going to do it. I was thinking, "Kylie Minogue? Who's Kylie Minogue? I got to make some money or I'm going to have to go back to my real job." And then I saw her ass in the video — she had these hot pants on and the video was sick — and I was like, "OK, I like Kylie Minogue. I'm going to make some money here."

— Kara DioGuardi, one of the writers of "Spinning Around", on her reaction before and after seeing the music video of the song.

Following its release, the music video became popular for the gold hotpants Minogue sported. It resulted in a media sensation regarding her bottom. British national broadsheet newspaper The Sunday Times deemed her bottom a "wonder of nature" and The Sun sponsored a campaign to "have Kylie Minogue's rear-end heritage-listed, preserved for "posteriority" on the grounds that it's an Area of Outstanding Natural Beauty." Readers were requested by the tabloid newspaper to persuade the government to make sure "[Minogue's] bum remains in safe hands - by turning it into a national institution." Rumours and speculations claiming Minogue had undergone plastic surgery to make her bottom look more appealing also began to arise during this time. In the same year, English broadcaster and journalist Johnny Vaughan commented "if an alien landed on Earth he would think Kylie's arse is the world's leader." Minogue's stylist and close friend William Baker explained his decision to "showcase" her bottom in the video, saying "Kylie's bottom is like a peach - sex sells and her best asset is her bum." The singer's response to the attention regarding her bottom was "dry," claiming "You never know what the future holds. It could become a pear." It was reported that Minogue had her bottom insured for five million dollars.

The hotpants were deemed "iconic" and were said to be the reason behind "Spinning Around" becoming a "musical and visual anthem in 2000." According to the catalogue entry for the hotpants at the Performing Arts Collection at the Arts Centre, Melbourne, British artist and photographer Katerina Jebb bought them for fifty pence from a flea market and they were only selected for use in the video the night before the shoot, though Minogue had worn them previously for a website photoshoot. She was surprised by the attention they attracted, commenting "I never imagined what impact a 50p pair of hotpants would have." She also said that the revealing nature of the hotpants made her feel insecure during the shooting, saying "I actually wasn't confident [in them], that's the crazy thing. I remember feeling quite self-conscious and kept wrapping a robe around me on set and would discard [it] right before the take." The garment is often referred to as "those hotpants," and have become a symbol for the singer's vitality and youthfulness. Considered to be one of her trademark looks, the attire she wore in the music video was put on display at Kylie: The Exhibition, an exhibition that featured "costumes and memorabilia collected over Kylie's career", held at the Victoria and Albert Museum in London, England, and at Kylie: An Exhibition, a similar exhibition held at the Powerhouse Museum in Sydney, Australia. It was also included in Minogue's official fashion photography book Kylie / Fashion, which was released on 19 November 2012 by Thames and Hudson to celebrate Minogue's completion of 25 years in music. In February 2014, Minogue donated the hotpants to the Performing Arts Collection museum at the Arts Centre in her hometown of Melbourne.

== Live performances ==
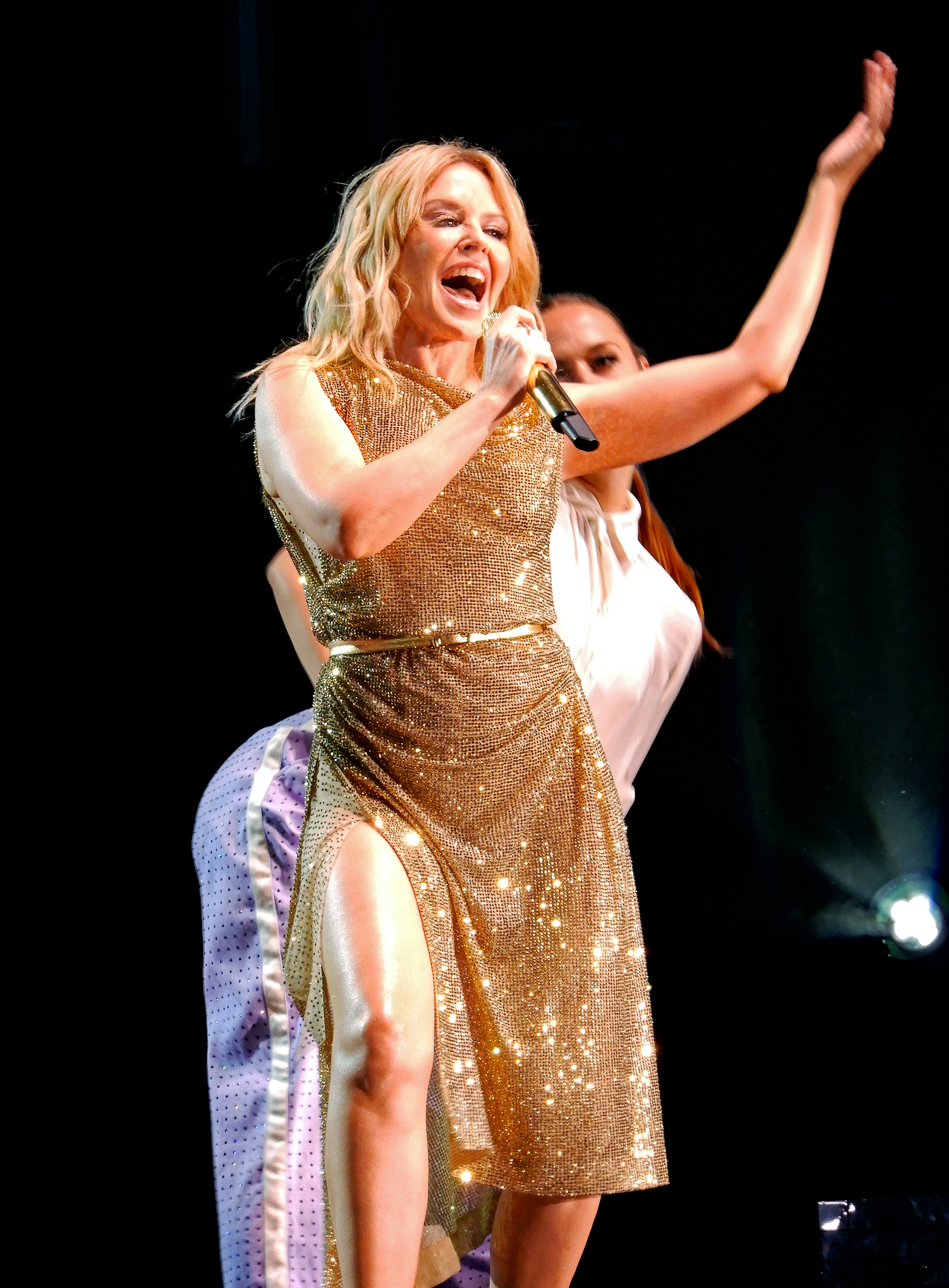
For the song's performance on her Golden (2018–19) and 2019 summer tour, Minogue wore a golden dress.

On 30 June 2000, Minogue performed "Spinning Around" on British music chart television programme Top of the Pops. She performed the song for the second time on the programme on 7 July. On 18 October 2000, Minogue performed the song on the 2000 Summer Paralympics Opening Ceremony. On 2 August 2001, Minogue performed "Spinning Around" at the BBC Radio 1 One Big Sunday show held at Leicester, in the United Kingdom, along with "Can't Get You Out of My Head"; for the performance, she wore a black trilby hat, sleeveless T-shirt (with a picture of Marilyn Monroe printed on it), knee length black boots, and trousers with open zips placed on both the thighs. "Spinning Around" was included on the "On Yer Bike" act of Minogue's one-off concert show Money Can't Buy, which was held on 15 November 2003. On 4 June 2012, she sang "Spinning Around" at the Diamond Jubilee Concert in front of the Buckingham Palace, held in honour of Elizabeth II. Minogue's wardrobe consisted of a pearl-studded black jacket and hat. Dance troupe Flawless, finalists of British television talent show Britain's Got Talent, served as Minogue's backing dancers. To promote her 2012 album The Abbey Road Sessions, Minogue headlined at Proms in the Park event in Hyde Park, London. This version of the song was exclusively performed at the event, as it was not included on the track list of the album.

Since its release, "Spinning Around" has been included in the set list of each of Minogue's concert tours, except the 2012 Anti Tour. It was the final performance of the encore segment of the On a Night Like This tour, which was launched to promote Light Years in 2001. Minogue and her back-up dancers dressed in mid 1980s-inspired outfits while performing the song. The song was performed during the "Droogie Nights" act of the KylieFever2002 tour. In 2005, she performed the song on her Showgirl: The Greatest Hits Tour. This version of the song featured the piano riff of "Finally", a 1991 song by American recording artist CeCe Peniston. Minogue was unable to complete the tour as she was diagnosed with early breast cancer and had to cancel the Australian leg of the tour. After undergoing treatment and recovery, she resumed the concert tour in the form of Showgirl: The Homecoming Tour in 2007, and performed "Spinning Around" with combined elements of her previous singles "Shocked" and "What Do I Have to Do". The song was performed as part of the "Beach Party" act of the KylieX2008 tour, during which Minogue was dressed as a "sequinned sailor."

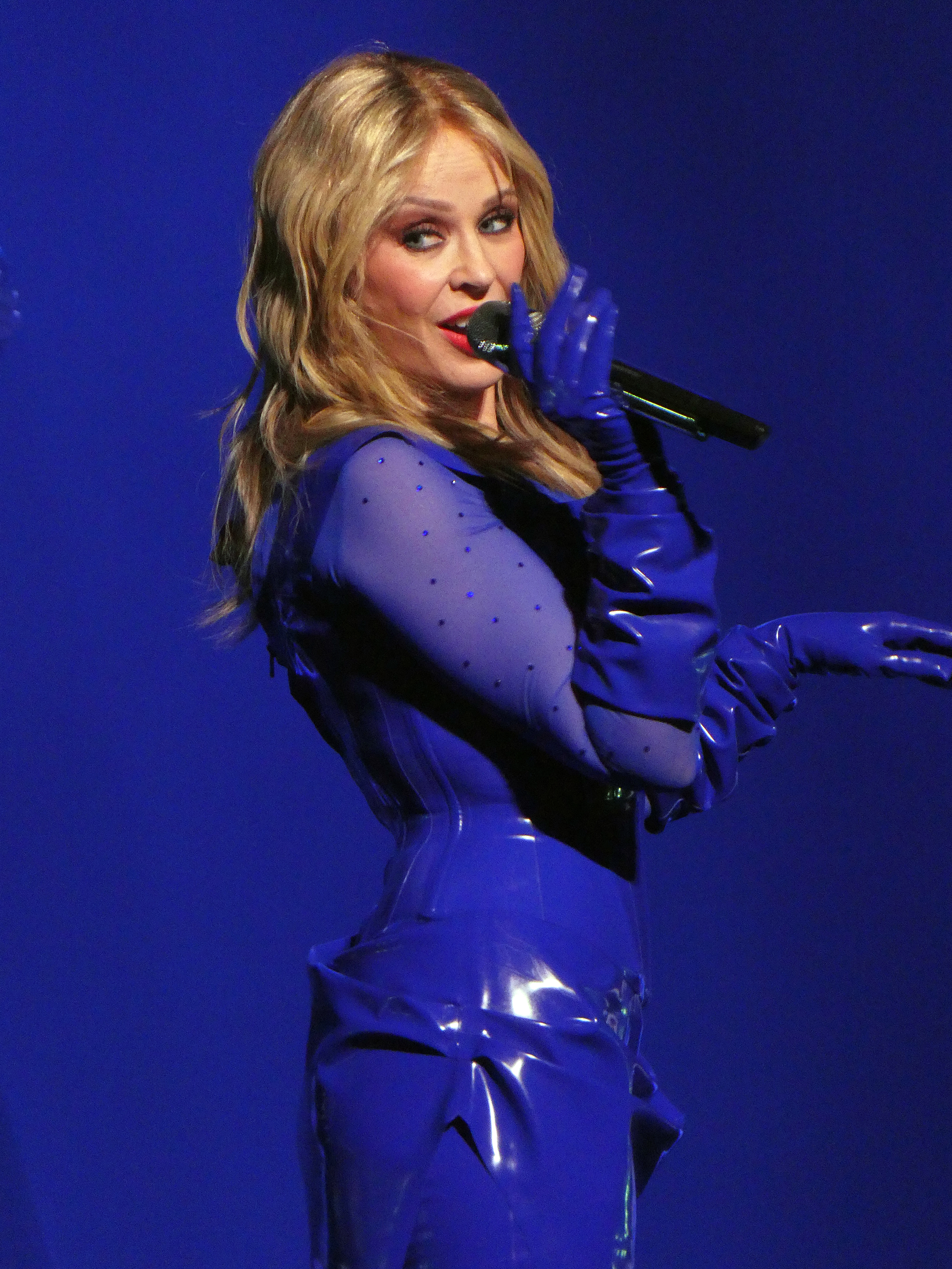
Minogue performing "Spinning Around" on 2025's Tension Tour

A medley of "Spinning Around", "Shocked", "What Do I Have to Do" and "Step Back in Time" was performed during the For You, for Me tour in 2009, Minogue's first North American tour. Dressed in a top hat and a black crinoline, Minogue performed "Spinning Around" during her Aphrodite: Les Folies Tour in 2011. Minogue performed "Spinning Around" as part of her seven-song set at the closing ceremony of the 2014 Commonwealth Games. The song was performed on Minogue's Kiss Me Once and Summer Tours, in 2014 and 2015 respectively, following a performance of "Step Back in Time", where Minogue wore a sparkly corset and jacket paired with a tie and thigh-high boots.

For 2018-19's Golden Tour, "Spinning Around" was presented in a Studio 54 setting and found Minogue, dressed in a sparkly golden dress, surrounded by dancers. Writing for The Guardian, Alexandra Spring felt that during the performance, the singer seemed "happy to give that famous bottom a moment in the spotlight". The song was then included on Minogue's 2019 summer tour: it was remixed with Cheryl Lynn's "Got to Be Real" (1978) and performed as one of the closing numbers. The performance featured rainbow-colored confetti being blasted into the crowd and was praised by NME's Dan Stubbs as "an all-out celebration". On 2025's Tension Tour, "Spinning Around" was reworked with EDM and disco elements, as noted by The Guardian's Sian Cain; Minogue donned a blue PVC ensamble and entered the stage perched on top of a glittering diamond.

== Formats and track listing ==
- Australian, New Zealand, and UK CD1
1. "Spinning Around" – 3:27
2. "Spinning Around" (Sharp vocal mix) – 7:06
3. "Spinning Around" (7th Spinnin' Dizzy dub) – 5:20
4. "Spinning Around" (video)
- Australian, New Zealand, and UK CD2
1. "Spinning Around" – 3:28
2. "Cover Me with Kisses" – 3:08
3. "Paper Dolls" – 3:34
- New Zealand cassette single
1. "Spinning Around" – 3:27
2. "Spinning Around" (Sharp vocal mix) – 7:06
- UK cassette single
1. "Spinning Around" – 3:28
2. "Spinning Around" (Sharp Double dub) – 7:08
- French CD single
1. "Spinning Around" – 3:28
2. "Cover Me with Kisses" – 3:06
- European CD maxi-single
1. "Spinning Around" – 3:27
2. "Cover Me with Kisses" – 3:07
3. "Paper Dolls" – 3:35
4. "Spinning Around" (Sharp vocal mix) – 7:04
5. "Spinning Around" (video)
- Digital download
1. "Spinning Around" (7th Spinnin' Dizzy dub) – 5:27
2. "Spinning Around" (live at Manchester Arena, 4 May 2002) – 4:15
3. "Spinning Around" (Sharp Double dub) – 7:08

== Charts ==
=== Weekly charts ===
Weekly chart performance for "Spinning Around"
Chart (2000)	Peak position
Australia (ARIA)	1
Belgium (Ultratop 50 Flanders)	35
Belgium (Ultratop 50 Wallonia)	39
Croatia International Airplay (HRT)	2
Czech Republic (IFPI)	4
Denmark (IFPI)	20
Europe (Eurochart Hot 100)	7
European Radio Top 50 (Music & Media)	5
France (SNEP)	28
Germany (GfK)	62
Hungary (Mahasz)	1
Hungary Airplay (Music & Media)	2
Iceland (Íslenski Listinn Topp 40)	7
Ireland (IRMA)	4
Netherlands (Dutch Top 40)	30
Netherlands (Single Top 100)	31
New Zealand (Recorded Music NZ)	2
Russia Airplay (InterMedia)	4
Scottish Singles Sales (Official Charts)	1
Sweden (Sverigetopplistan)	42
Switzerland (Schweizer Hitparade)	34
UK Singles (Official Charts)	1

=== Year-end charts ===
Year-end chart performance for "Spinning Around"
Chart (2000)	Position
Australia (ARIA)	28
Europe (European Hit Radio)	24
Iceland (Íslenski Listinn Topp 40)	62
Ireland (IRMA)	52
New Zealand (RIANZ)	24
UK Singles (OCC)	46

== Certifications and sales ==
Certifications and sales for "Spinning Around"
Region	Certification	Certified units/sales
Australia (ARIA)	Platinum	70,000^{^}
New Zealand (RMNZ) Physical sales	Gold	5,000^{*}
New Zealand (RMNZ) Digital sales + streaming	Gold	15,000^{‡}
United Kingdom (BPI)	Platinum	600,000^{‡}
^{*} Sales figures based on certification alone.^{^} Shipments figures based on certification alone.^{‡} Sales+streaming figures based on certification alone.

== See also ==
- List of number-one singles of 2000 (Australia)
- List of UK Singles Chart number ones of the 2000s
