= Kiss Me Once Live at the SSE Hydro =

2015 album by Kylie Minogue

Live album by Kylie Minogue
- Released: 23 March 2015
- Recorded: 12 November 2014
- Venues: SSE Hydro (Glasgow, Scotland)
- Genre: Pop
- Label: Parlophone

Kylie Minogue chronology
Sleepwalker (2014)	Kiss Me Once Live at the SSE Hydro (2015)	Kylie and Garibay (2015)

Kylie Minogue video chronology
Aphrodite Les Folies – Live in London (2011)	Kiss Me Once Live at The SSE Hydro (2015)	A Kylie Christmas – Live from the Royal Albert Hall 2015 (2016)

Kiss Me Once Live at the SSE Hydro is the seventh live album by Australian singer Kylie Minogue.

== Background and release ==
The show was filmed during her Kiss Me Once Tour at the SSE Hydro in Glasgow and directed by William Baker. It was released on most formats including a double-disc CD, DVD, and Blu-ray. "Timebomb", which was not aired on the ITV special, was released to Kylie's official YouTube account as a sneak peek for the Blu-ray/CD and DVD/CD sets on 4 March 2015. "Tears on My Pillow" was performed in Glasgow and is also included on the DVD/Blu-ray, but is not included on the CD. The official cover of this video is a slightly silhouetted image of Kylie performing "Les Sex" on a giant lip couch. The video was released on 23 March 2015. The DVD/Blu-ray also includes "Sleepwalker", a short film which was played before each show started, and screen projections for "In My Arms", "Skirt", "Chasing Ghosts", "Sexercize" and "Can't Get You Out of My Head".

== Track listing ==
Kiss Me Once Live at the SSE Hydro - DVD / Blu-ray tracklisting
No.	Title	Length
1.	"Breathe" (Intro)	2:38
2.	"Les Sex"	4:39
3.	"In My Arms"	4:39
4.	"Timebomb"	3:56
5.	"Wow"	4:01
6.	"Step Back in Time"	6:49
7.	"Spinning Around"	3:15
8.	"Your Disco Needs You"	5:35
9.	"On a Night Like This"	3:40
10.	"Slow"	3:38
11.	"Enjoy Yourself" (Intro)	5:14
12.	"Hand on Your Heart"	4:54
13.	"Never Too Late"	6:01
14.	"Got to Be Certain"	2:38
15.	"I Should Be So Lucky"	3:35
16.	"Skirt" (Intro)	4:41
17.	"Need You Tonight"	3:43
18.	"Sexercize"	5:09
19.	"Can't Get You Out of My Head"	4:37
20.	"Kids"	4:14
21.	"Beautiful"	3:17
22.	"Kiss Me Once"	7:18
23.	"Get Outta My Way"	3:20
24.	"Love at First Sight"	4:03
25.	"Tears on My Pillow"	1:52
26.	"The Loco-Motion"	4:14
27.	"All the Lovers"	4:14
28.	"Into the Blue"	5:30
29.	"Credits"	5:30
30.	"Sleepwalker" (Kylie + Garibay)
31.	"Chasing Ghosts" (Screen visual)
32.	"Sexercize" (Screen visual)
33.	"Skirt" (Screen visual)
34.	"Can't Get You Out of My Head" (Screen visual)
35.	"In My Arms" (Screen visual)

Kiss Me Once Live at the SSE Hydro - CD (Disc 1)
No.	Title	Length
1.	"Breathe" (Intro)	3:02
2.	"Les Sex"	2:19
3.	"In My Arms"	3:35
4.	"Timebomb"	4:08
5.	"Wow"	3:13
6.	"Step Back in Time"	4:46
7.	"Spinning Around"	3:23
8.	"Your Disco Needs You"	4:52
9.	"On a Night Like This"	3:33
10.	"Slow"	4:10
11.	"Enjoy Yourself" (Intro)	0:54
12.	"Hand on Your Heart"	2:42
13.	"Never Too Late"	1:51
14.	"Got to Be Certain"	1:52
15.	"I Should Be So Lucky"	2:50

Kiss Me Once Live at the SSE Hydro - CD (Disc 2)
No.	Title	Length
1.	"Need You Tonight"	4:06
2.	"Sexercize"	3:46
3.	"Nu-di-ty" (Segue)	0:55
4.	"Can't Get You Out of My Head"	6:05
5.	"Kids"	4:57
6.	"Beautiful"	5:32
7.	"Kiss Me Once"	3:54
8.	"Get Outta My Way"	6:25
9.	"Love at First Sight"	4:54
10.	"The Loco-Motion"	4:17
11.	"All the Lovers"	4:01
12.	"Into the Blue"	6:34

== Charts ==
=== Weekly charts ===
==== Album ====
Chart (2015)	Peak position
Australian Albums (ARIA)	97
Belgian Albums (Ultratop Flanders)	57
Belgian Albums (Ultratop Wallonia)	46
Czech Albums (ČNS IFPI)	12
Dutch Albums (Album Top 100)	28
German Albums (Offizielle Top 100)	51
Hungarian Albums (MAHASZ)	3
Irish Albums (IRMA)	30
Mexican Albums (AMPROFON)	21
Scottish Albums (Official Charts)	19
UK Albums (Official Charts)	26
US Top Dance Albums (Billboard)	21

==== DVD ====
Chart (2015)	Peak position
Australian Music DVD (ARIA)	1
French Music DVD (SNEP)	2
Italian Music DVD (FIMI)	4
Japanese Music DVD (Oricon)	133
Swedish Music DVD (Sverigetopplistan)	7
Taiwanese Music DVD (5-Music)	9
US Music Video Sales (Billboard)	37

=== Year-end charts ===
==== DVD ====
Chart (2015)	Peak position
Australian Music DVD (ARIA)	21
