= Kylie and Garibay (EP) =

2015 extended play by Kylie and Garibay

EP by Kylie and Garibay
- Released: 11 September 2015
- Recorded: 2014–2015
- Studio: Paradise (Los Angeles)
- Genres: Electronic; disco; pop
- Length: 12:21
- Labels: Kimberly; Parlophone
- Producer: Fernando Garibay

Kylie and Garibay chronology
Sleepwalker (2014)	Kylie and Garibay (2015)

Kylie Minogue chronology
Kiss Me Once Live at the SSE Hydro (2015)	Kylie and Garibay (2015)	Kylie Christmas (2015)

Kylie and Garibay (stylised as Kylie + Garibay; alternatively titled Black and White) is the second extended play (EP) by musical duo Kylie and Garibay. Following Kylie Minogue's departure from her management company, Roc Nation, the three-track EP was released as a surprise on 11 September 2015 by Parlophone and her own production company, Kimberly Limited. Solely produced by Fernando Garibay, the EP served as an extension of the duo's first collaboration, Sleepwalker (2014). Initiated in September 2014, the recording process enlisted Giorgio Moroder, Sam Sparro, and Shaggy as co-writers and feature vocalists.

Musically, the EP is a combination of electronic, disco, and pop music. Its lyrical content completes a story arc that began in Sleepwalker, going from loss to recovery after a heartbreak. Music critics complimented Garibay's experimental arrangement, Minogue's performance, and the collaborations on the EP. Kylie and Garibay peaked at number 100 in Australia, with the tracks charting in low positions in France, Scotland, and the UK. Directed by Minogue's longtime friend and colleague Katerina Jebb, the music videos for "Black and White" and "Your Body" were published in September 2015.

== Background and recording ==
In 2013, Australian singer Kylie Minogue announced she had signed a management deal with Roc Nation, an entertainment agency founded by American rapper and businessman Jay-Z. A year later, she released her twelfth studio album, Kiss Me Once. Minogue met with several songwriters and producers to create the album; among them was Mexican-American producer Fernando Garibay. They recorded several songs intended for Kiss Me Once, but none of them made it onto the final tracklist. Months after the album release, they decided to finish the tracks and publish them for free on Minogue's SoundCloud channel as an EP, titled Sleepwalker, in September 2014. Minogue also filmed an accompanying short film for the EP, which was played during the Kiss Me Once Tour (2014–2015).

Following the enthusiastic response Sleepwalker received among her fans, Minogue went on to record more material with Garibay. The recording process started in September 2014, right after the release of Sleepwalker. The sessions took place in London and Los Angeles. The producer traveled to London to work with Minogue while she was on the Kiss Me Once Tour. She later spent time in Los Angeles with Garibay during breaks in her tour schedule at his home studio, Paradise Studio. The songs were written as a platform for creative expression, devoid of any agenda or expectations. Garibay described a "sense of purity" that resonated throughout their creative process, and Minogue felt there was no pressure surrounding the project, calling it "a project made of love". The singer was inspired by the work of Garibay and enjoyed being in the studio with him.

The duo collaborated with Italian music producer Giorgio Moroder on "Your Body". It was the second collaboration between Minogue and Moroder, following "Right Here, Right Now" (2015). Garibay has known Moroder since he was 16 and admired his early film scores for their sensuality. "Your Body" deviates from Garibay's common songwriting style, as he struggled to evoke the erotic work of Minogue and Moroder. Moroder agreed to co-write a poem in Italian with the duo, and he called an Italian acquaintance to double-check the words. The duo wanted Moroder to record the poem in Italian to create a genuine and sensual impression. "[Minogue] wanted it really sexy, like a Latin lover – heavy breathing. I think she was quite happy," Moroder recalled. The recording session with Moroder lasted roughly two hours. Jamie Hartman and Max McElligott of the British band Wolf Gang were also credited as the songwriters.

Australian singer-songwriter Sam Sparro co-wrote "If I Can't Have You" with Garibay and Brian Lee. Minogue was on the phone with the songwriters and she was "an active participant", according to Garibay. She was not, however, given credit as a songwriter. Sparro, a long-time fan of Minogue, claimed she was supportive during their session. Garibay sought to find a male counterpart besides Minogue for "Black and White". Martin Kierszenbaum, his manager at the time, introduced him to Jamaican artist Shaggy. Garibay sent the instrumental track of "Black and White" to Shaggy and received a demo a day later. Minogue felt that Shaggy's contribution "made that track come to life".

== Music and lyrics ==
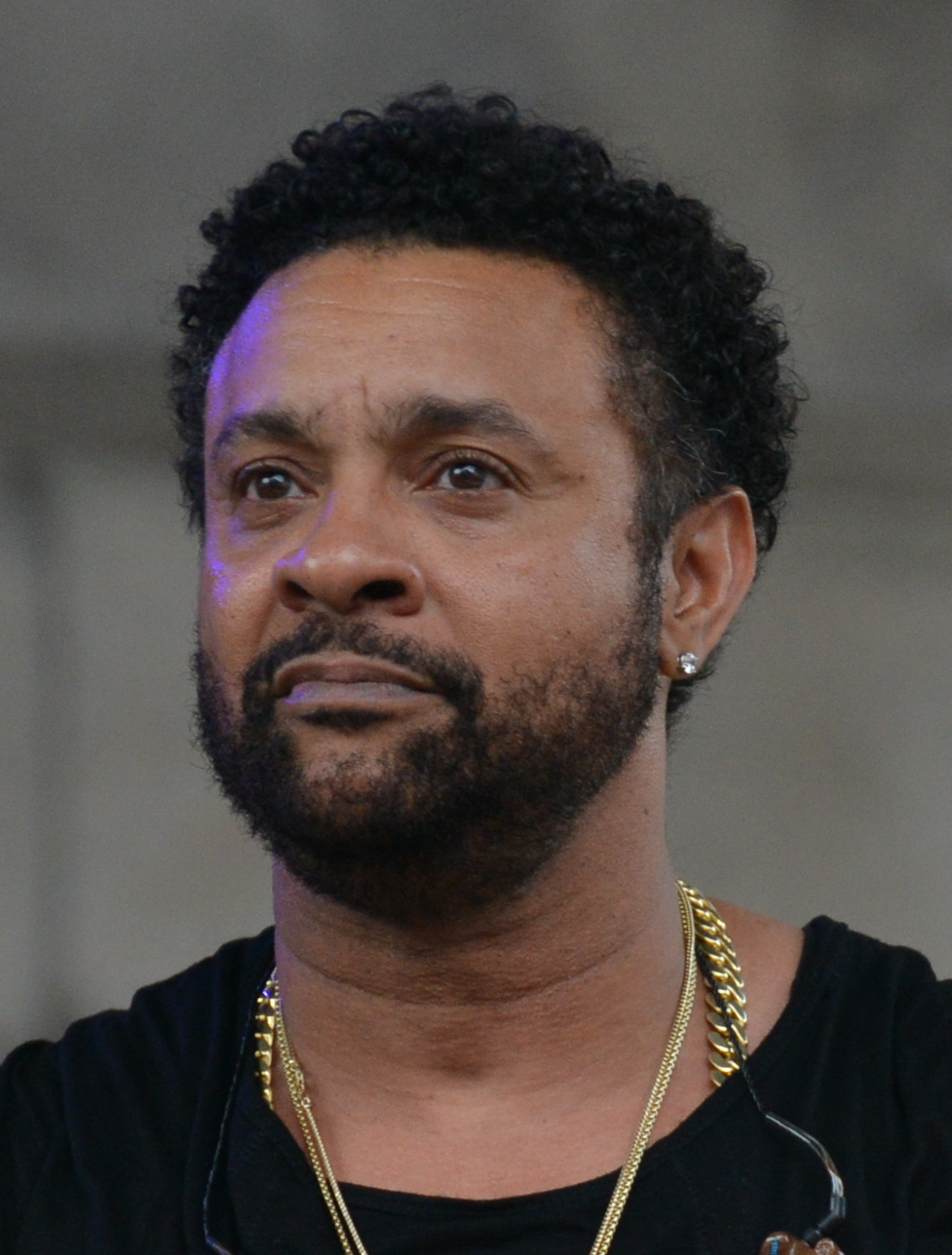
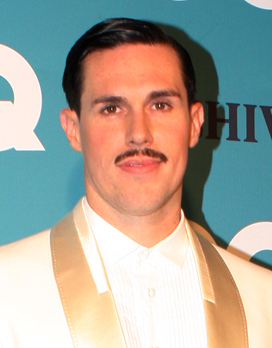
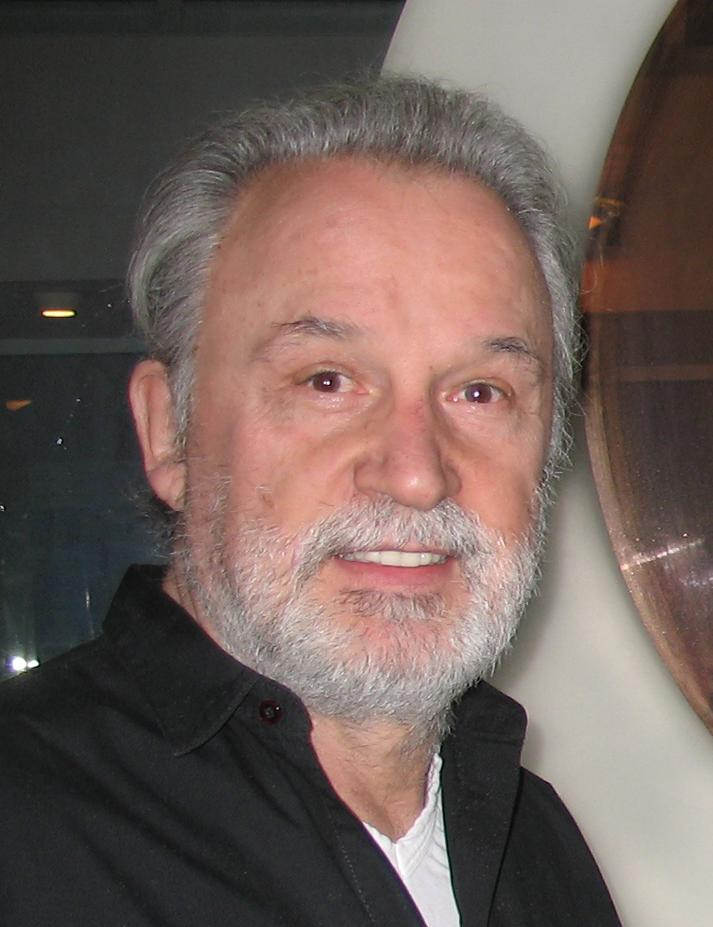
Shaggy (left, pictured in 2018), Sam Sparro (middle, pictured in 2012), and Giorgio Moroder (right, pictured in 2008) co-wrote and contributed vocals to the EP

The songs on Kylie and Garibay incorporate elements from electronic, disco, and pop music. The three-song set represents a departure from the dancehall and reggae-influenced sounds on Sleepwalker. Mike Wass from Idolator opined that the tracks are more accessible than those on Sleepwalker, especially when compared with experimental tracks like "Walk" and "Chasing Ghosts". Minogue found the three distinct tracks are linked sonically by Garibay's crisp production.

"Black and White" is a 1990s-inspired chill-out Eurodance song in which Shaggy raps over Minogue's delicate vocals. John Earls, writing for Classic Pop, wrote the song is "a straight-up pop titan" despite Shaggy's reggae roots. It is followed by "If I Can't Have You", a tropical-tinged combination of deep house and dance-pop. Alistair Powell of Classic Pop called it an energetic floor-filler, while Julien Goncalves of PureCharts described it as a "melancholic yet danceable song" that was tailored-made for the UK charts. Garibay defined the music of "Your Body", the EP's final song, as "indie meets disco". The song has a seamless transition between the chorus and the verses, culminating in a guitar outro. Minogue's vocals are heavily manipulated into whimsical and cartoonish syllables. She can be heard chanting "Your body" amidst the moody analog synths during the refrain. Pitchfork's Zoe Camp suggested that by processing Minogue's delicate soprano, Garibay has repurposed her into "a stiff, digitized rhythm instrument" that is similar to the work of Swedish singer Robyn. Speaking on the New Zealand talk show Paul Henry, music reviewer Charlotte Ryan noted that the sensual track is not as danceable as Minogue's earlier work.

Garibay viewed the three-song EP as an extension of Sleepwalker, a project that chronologically portrayed the stages of heartbreak. As the journey unfolds, a sense of celebration and accomplishment, highlighted by the act of dating and interacting with new people, replaces early feelings of devastation following a broken relationship. Throughout this evolution, the music carries cathartic and transformative energy, with dance playing a vital role in conveying these messages. On "Black and White", Shaggy reassures his lover, "I need you in my arms, girl". Garibay wrote "If I Don't Have You" as a form of musical—it is an intimate conversation, where the protagonist is reaching a point of letting go and longing for someone else to fight for their affection. Earls labeled the track "a laidback and soulful love lament". On "Your Body", Moroder sighs and reads a poem about seduction in Italian during the song intro, with lines such as "Le tue carezze mi bruciano di passione" ("Your caresses burn me with passion"). Garibay explained his intention was to make Moroder sound like "a priest telling you how you should make love to a woman".

== Release and promotion ==
In January 2015, Moroder confirmed his collaboration with Minogue and Garibay on their second EP. He claimed the duo was working on four tracks that are "very sexy and very uncommercial". A month later, Moroder and the duo performed a live version of "Your Body" for the first time at a West Hollywood nightclub. In March 2015, Minogue parted ways with Roc Nation, after two years on their roster, and planned "to take more control over her career". She also left her record label of 16 years, Parlophone. Six months later, Kylie and Garibay was released without any prior official announcement on 11 September 2015. Minogue issued a statement in which she expressed her excitement at "finally be able to share these songs with fans". Despite Minogue's departure from Parlophone, Kylie and Garibay was still released under the label and Minogue's own production company, Kimberly Limited. The EP was digitally distributed on the iTunes Store and streaming service Spotify; Warner Music Japan and Parlophone released it as a promotional CD-R five days later. The EP was alternatively titled Black and White on Minogue's website.

The EP was accompanied by a music video for "Black and White", directed by English artist Katerina Jebb and edited by Benjamin Ricart. It premiered on Purple magazine's website and Minogue's YouTube channel. The singer described the video as a celebration of life, freedom, and her 25-year friendship with Jebb, saying "I knew we would produce something which speaks volumes of our friendship... No pressure, just love." Inspired by vintage home movies, the video shows Minogue frolicking and dancing by the pool while wearing a tassel bikini and a wedding veil. Shaggy does not appear in the video. Robbie Daw of Idolator referred to Minogue's appearance as a "silver screen goddess from Hollywood's golden age". On September 13, a black-and-white music video for "Your Body" was published. Also directed by Jebb, it features body-conscious and S&M-related imagery. Ryan praised Minogue's appearance in the video, calling it "delicious".

== Reception ==
A low-key experimental project, Kylie and Garibay had little success on the music charts. A week after its release, the EP peaked at number 100 on the Australia Albums Chart, while all of the tracks appeared on the French Singles Chart: "Black and White" (140), "If I Can't Have You" (168), and "Your Body" (174). In the UK, "Black and White" reached number 34 on the Dance Singles Chart and number 66 on the Singles Downloads Chart. The track also peaked at number 72 on the Scottish Singles Chart.

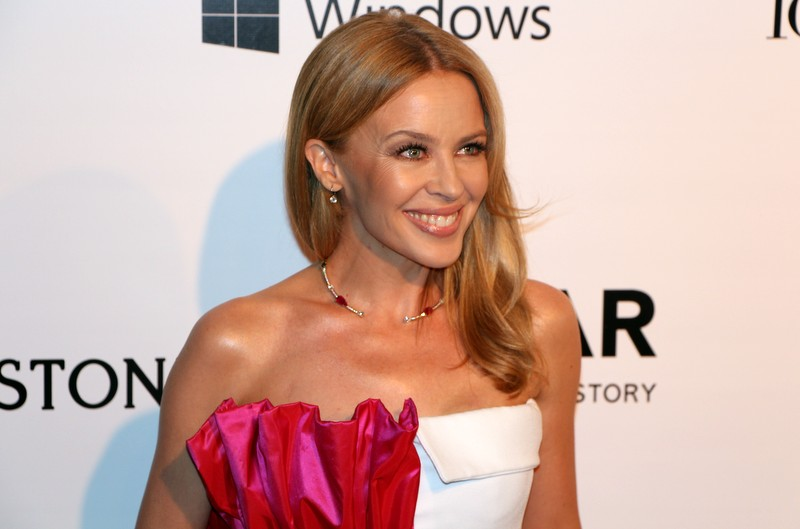
Music critics highlighted Minogue's (pictured in 2015) versatility and her collaborations on the EP.

Music critics recognised the EP's experimental nature and its production. Described the project as a "B-road left turn from [Minogue's] pop motorway", the writers of Classic Pop opined that the end result was unexpectedly enjoyable. Goncalves and John Rowley of Junkee praised Minogue's willingness to embrace different musical styles while maintaining her unique elements. Garibay's coherent and atmospheric production was lauded by Billboard's Keith Caulfield, who labeled the EP an "effortless pop music" project.

Several reviewers remarked on the collaborators. Shaggy's performance in "Black and White" was dismissed as unnecessary and inferior to Minogue's by Goncalves and John Earls of Classic Pop. Lewis Corner and Amy Davidson from Digital Spy, however, found his rap verses "oddly warming". "Your Body" was picked as the EP highlight by Rowley and Camp, who commended the labyrinthine production, Minogue's processed vocals, and Moroder's captivating monologue. Goncalves enjoyed the high-pitched performance between Minogue and Sparro on "If I Can't Have You" and chose it as the standout track. In 2023, Classic Pop's listed "Black and White" and "If I Can't Have You" among Minogue's best collaborations and named "Your Body" her second-best deep-cut track. Rowley picked "Your Body" as one of Minogue's most innovative dance tracks, calling it mechanical and compelling.

== Track listing ==
All tracks are produced by Fernando Garibay.

Kylie and Garibay
No.	Title	Writer(s)	Length
1.	"Black and White" (featuring Shaggy)	Kylie Minogue; Orville Burrell; Fernando Garibay; Whitney Phillips	3:37
2.	"If I Can't Have You" (featuring Sam Sparro)	Garibay; Samuel Falson; Brian Lee	3:37
3.	"Your Body" (featuring Giorgio Moroder)	Minogue; Garibay; Phillips; Giorgio Moroder; Gary Go; Gino Campagna; Jamie Hartman; Max McElligott	5:07
Total length:			12:21

== Personnel ==
The following credits are adapted from APRA AMCOS and Apple Music.

- Kylie Minogue – vocals, songwriting (1,3)
- Fernando Garibay – production, songwriting
- Giorgio Moroder – songwriting (3), vocals (3)
- Shaggy – songwriting (1), vocals (1)
- Sam Sparro – songwriting (2), vocals (2)
- Brian Lee – songwriting (2)
- Whitney Phillips – songwriting (1,3)
- Gary Go – songwriting (3)
- Gino Campagna – songwriting (3)
- Jamie Hartman – songwriting (3)
- Max McElligott – songwriting (3)

== Charts ==
Chart performance for Kylie and Garibay
Chart (2015)	Peak position
Australian Albums (ARIA)	100

Chart performance for "If I Can't Have You"
Chart (2015)	Peak position
France (SNEP)	168

Chart performance for "Your Body"
Chart (2015)	Peak position
France (SNEP)	174

Chart performance for "Black and White"
Chart (2015)	Peak position
France (SNEP)	140
Scotland (OCC)	72
UK Dance (OCC)	34
UK Singles Downloads (OCC)	66

== Release history ==
Release dates and formats for Kylie and Garibay
Region	Date	Format	Label	Ref.
Various	11 September 2015	Digital download	Parlophone; Warner Music	
Japan	16 September 2015	CD-R	Parlophone; Warner Music Japan	
