= Sleepwalker (EP) =

2014 extended play by Kylie and Garibay

- SoundCloud artwork

EP by Kylie and Garibay
- Released: 24 September 2014
- Recorded: 2013–2014
- Studio: Paradise (Los Angeles)
- Genres: Electropop; dance
- Length: 15:06
- Producer: Fernando Garibay

Kylie and Garibay chronology
Sleepwalker (2014)	Kylie and Garibay (2015)

Kylie Minogue chronology
Kiss Me Once (2014)	Sleepwalker (2014)	Kiss Me Once Live at the SSE Hydro (2015)

Short film
- "Sleepwalker" on YouTube

Sleepwalker (alternatively titled Kylie + Garibay) is the debut extended play (EP) by musical duo Kylie and Garibay, composed of Australian singer-songwriter Kylie Minogue and American record producer Fernando Garibay. In 2013, Minogue began working with Garibay on material intended for her twelfth studio album, Kiss Me Once (2014). However, these songs ultimately went unreleased. Later, at Garibay's home studio in Los Angeles, the duo finished three tracks and wrote a new one titled "Chasing Ghosts". The recording process enlisted MNDR, Peter Wade, and Sterling Fox as co-writers.

Sleepwalker has garnered praise from music critics for its diverse range of influences, characterised by its experimental blend of electropop and dance music. Its lyrics follow a story arc, exploring themes of heartbreak and unrequited love. The EP was released as a free download on SoundCloud on September 24, 2014, coinciding with the start of Minogue's 2014–2015 Kiss Me Once Tour. A William Baker-directed short film, produced for the project, served as the tour's pre-show feature. The positive reception from Minogue's fanbase, who encouraged her to collaborate further with Garibay, led to their second EP, Kylie and Garibay, released in 2015.

== Background and recording ==
In 2013, Australian singer Kylie Minogue announced she had signed a management deal with Roc Nation, an entertainment agency handled by American rapper and businessman Jay-Z. The announcement was made after she parted ways with her long-term manager Terry Blamey and the British label EMI. For her twelfth studio album, Kiss Me Once, she collaborated with several composers and producers, including Mexican-American producer Fernando Garibay. The producer began his career in the 1990s and has always wanted to work with Minogue, whom he regards as a "real-life Tinker Bell" because of her whimsical charisma.

Garibay, working with Minogue, wanted to create music that resonated with her existing fanbase, while also attracting a new generation of listeners rather than attempting to reinvent her image and achieving a different perspective. However, the songs they wrote together were eventually dropped from the album, which was released in March 2014. Garibay believed the decision stemmed from a misalignment between his creative vision and Roc Nation's plans for Minogue, and the material deviated significantly from her previous releases. Minogue considered the songs produced by Garibay to be excellent, but ultimately could not include them on the final tracklist hoping the songs would "find the right home when it's the right time".

A few months after the album's release, while in Los Angeles, Minogue contacted the producer to express her desire to complete the tracks. She went to Garibay's home studio, Paradise Studio, and finished them in a week. These recordings included three unreleased tracks from Kiss Me Once—"Glow", "Wait", and "Break This Heartbreak"—which was co-written by songwriters MNDR and Peter Wade. Additionally, Minogue and Garibay co-wrote a new song, titled "Chasing Ghosts", along with MNDR and Sterling Fox. MNDR, whose song "Les Sex" appeared on the tracklist of Kiss Me Once, was pleased with the recordings.

== Music and lyrics ==
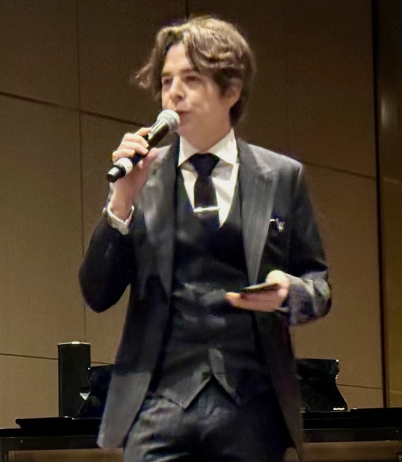
Garibay (pictured in 2024), the EP's producer, conceived of the project as an exploration of heartbreak and unrequited love.

Garibay described the tracks in Sleepwalker as a mixture of his urban sound and Minogue's playful charisma, calling it "Peter Pan meets Tinker Bell". The EP primarily draws inspiration from electropop and dance music, but music critics largely consider it to be an experimental project for Minogue, showcasing a diverse range of influences including pop-rock, ska, disco, reggae, and dancehall. John Earles of Classic Pop opined that the inclusion of dancehall and reggae demonstrated Minogue's clear connection to the prevalent style of her then-management company, Roc Nation. Laurence Day of The Line of Best Fit commented that the project "sounds far from the glossy sheen we're used to [hear]" from the singer. The fifteen-minute EP is characterised by the distinct musical style of each track. "Break This Heartbreak" is an electronica song, while "Glow" offers a darker, moodier atmosphere punctuated by echoing effects. The producer likened the powerful sound of "Glow" during the chorus to that of a sledgehammer. Both "Wait" and "Chasing Ghosts" incorporate elements of Afro-Caribbean music into their compositions. Critics highlighted "Chasing Ghosts" as the EP's most sonically distinct track, featuring male rap verses and ska influences.

Heartbreak and unrequited love are the primary themes of Sleepwalker, inspired by the emotional low the duo were experiencing during the songwriting process. Its title reflects the desire to sleep through the pain of heartbreak, evoking the image of a zombified, emotionally devastated person. The EP chronologically charts the stages of heartbreak through a cathartic dance narrative: beginning with a moody and devastated state, the listener progresses through the various phases of healing. "Everything is interweaved into this magical, cathartic movement," Garibay explained. The EP concludes with "Chasing Ghosts", a brighter, guitar-driven track intended to offer a hopeful look toward the future.

== Short film ==
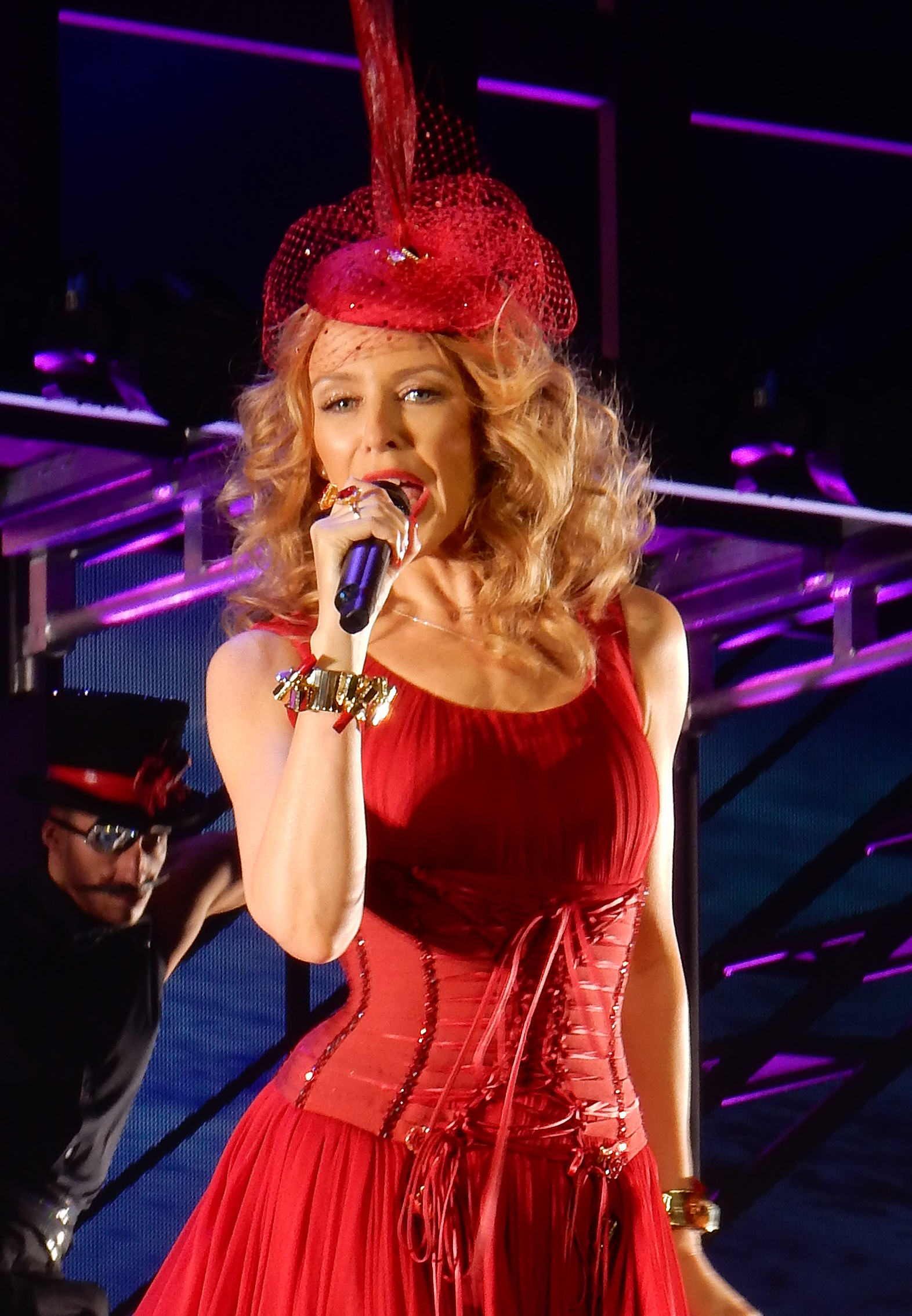
The Sleepwalker short film, directed by William Baker, was shown as a pre-show interlude during the Kiss Me Once Tour (pictured in 2014)

The duo co-starred in a short film for the project directed by William Baker. The short film features English dancer Aaron Sillis, who also contributed to the choreography. Following Minogue's agreement to become a brand ambassador for Sloggi in September 2014, the underwear company sponsored the film and provided costumes for the dancers. The video was part of Sloggi's Feel Your Freedom campaign, which resonated with Garibay's focus on creative freedom and escapism. The short film's costumes were provided by designers Dolce & Gabbana, Meadham Kirchhoff, Christian Louboutin, and Jean Paul Gaultier. The short film contains three of the tracks from the EP, with the exclusion of "Chasing Ghosts".

The eight-minute film creates a dreamlike atmosphere through the use of light effects, featuring Minogue dancing in atmospheric locations. The singer played different characters, including Sleeping Beauty and Miss Havisham from Charles Dickens's Great Expectations (1861). She is seen falling asleep in a glass coffin and dancing in a long red dress. Yohann Ruelle of Pure Charts compared Minogue's appearance to that of a princess. The film ends with "Break This Heartbreak", when Minogue wakes up from her sleep and rolls around in a pile of flowers in a white outfit.

== Release and reception ==
Minogue intended to release Sleepwalker with Garibay as a gift for her fans, rather than a commercial product. "It was really more of a passion project," Minogue said. The producer, who recognised the shared fanbase, agreed with this approach. The Sleepwalker short film was incorporated into Minogue's Kiss Me Once Tour as a pre-show feature, starting on 24 September 2024 at the Liverpool Arena. Apart from the film, Minogue recorded footage for "Chasing Ghosts", which was played as an interlude during the show. That same date, the songs were made available to stream and download for free on Minogue's SoundCloud account, titled Kylie + Garibay. A 2015 live album, recorded at Glasgow's SSE Hydro, includes both Sleepwalker and "Chasing Ghosts" footages. The Sleepwalker short film was published on the website of Vogue on 18 November, and on Minogue's YouTube channel two days later.

Music critics praised the experimental nature of the EP. Caitlyn White of MTV and Lucas Villa of AXS appreciated Minogue's continued experimentation with unconventional electronica and pop sounds. Villa called the tracks "ethereally gorgeous", singling out "Glow" as a standout. Mandy Rogers of EQ Music declared the EP superior to the songs on Kiss Me Once. While the writers from PureCharts commended the sensual short film, they criticised the production of "Break This Heartbreak" and "Chasing Ghosts" on the EP as lazy and repetitive. Despite being ineligible for chart placement due to its release as a free download, the EP was well-received by Minogue's fanbase. She recorded more material with Garibay after the release of Sleepwalker, which led to their second EP in 2015, titled Kylie and Garibay. Garibay saw his work with Minogue on Sleepwalker as a catalyst for future unconventional collaborations with other artists, with a focus on free releases.

== Track listing ==
All tracks produced by Fernando Garibay.

Sleepwalker
No.	Title	Writer(s)	Length
1.	"Glow"	Kylie Minogue; Fernando Garibay; Amanda Lucille Warner	4:24
2.	"Wait"	Garibay; Warner; Peter Wade Keusch	3:40
3.	"Break This Heartbreak"	Minogue; Garibay; Warner	4:14
4.	"Chasing Ghosts"	Minogue; Garibay; Warner; Brandon Lowry	2:48
Total length:			15:06

== Personnel ==
The following credits are adapted from APRA AMCOS:

- Kylie Minogue – vocals, songwriting (1,3,4)
- Fernando Garibay – production, songwriting
- MNDR – songwriting
- Peter Wade Keusch – songwriting (2)
- Sterling Fox – songwriting (4)
