= Kylie and Garibay =

Musical duo Kylie Minogue and Fernando Garibay

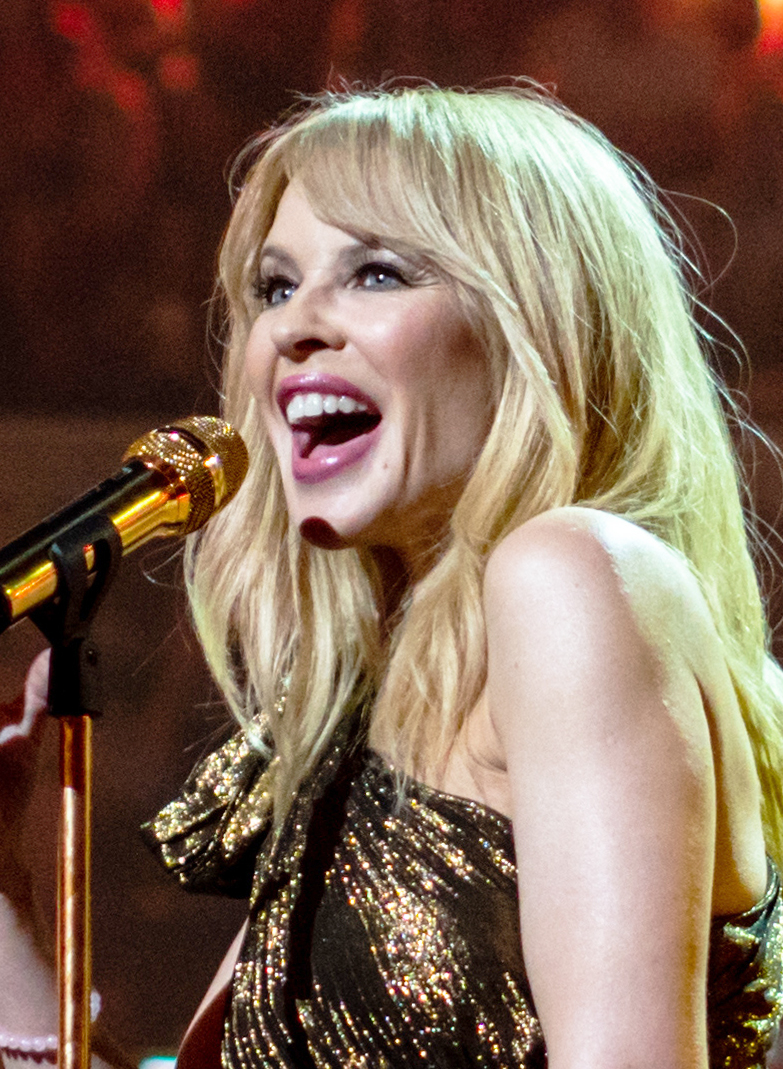
- Kylie Minogue pictured in April 2018.

Background information
- Origin: Los Angeles, California, U.S.
- Genres: Electronic; dance-pop
- Years active: 2014–2015
- Labels: Warner; Parlophone
- Members: Kylie Minogue; Fernando Garibay

Kylie and Garibay (stylized as Kylie + Garibay) were a musical duo composed of Australian singer-songwriter Kylie Minogue and American record producer Fernando Garibay. The duo are based in Los Angeles, California, U.S., where Garibay's home studio is located. Their debut extended play (EP), Sleepwalker (2014), was accompanied by a short film directed by English fashion designer William Baker, and was presented at Minogue's fourteenth concert tour, the Kiss Me Once Tour. Sleepwalker was followed by the duo's self-titled EP (2015), which contained guest appearances from Jamaican musician Shaggy, Australian singer Sam Sparro, and Italian record producer Giorgio Moroder.

== Discography ==
=== Extended plays ===
Title	Details	Peak chart positions
Title	Details	AUS
Sleepwalker	Released: September 24, 2014; Label: Warner Bros.; Formats: Streaming	—
Kylie and Garibay	Released: September 11, 2015; Label: Parlophone; Formats: Streaming, digital download	100

=== Charted songs ===
List of songs, with selected chart positions
Title	Year	Charts		Extended play
Title	Year	AUS	FRA	Extended play
"Black and White" (featuring Shaggy)	2015	100	140	Kylie and Garibay
"If I Can't Have You" (featuring Sam Sparro)	2015	—	168	Kylie and Garibay
"Your Body" (featuring Giorgio Moroder)	2015	—	174	Kylie and Garibay
