= Sexercize =

2014 promotional single by Kylie Minogue

Promotional single by Kylie Minogue

from the album Kiss Me Once
- Released: 14 March 2014
- Recorded: 2013
- Studio: Conway (Los Angeles, CA); Pulse (Los Angeles, CA); Serenity West (Los Angeles, CA)
- Genre: Dubstep
- Length: 2:49
- Label: Parlophone
- Songwriters: Sia Furler; Marcus Lomax; Jordan Johnson; Stefan Johnson; Clarence Coffee; Nella Tahrini
- Producers: The Monsters & The Strangerz; Kelly Sheehan

Music video
- "Sexercize" on YouTube

"Sexercize" is a song by Australian singer Kylie Minogue from her twelfth studio album Kiss Me Once (2014). The song was written by Sia, Marcus Lomax, Jordan Johnson, Stefan Johnson, Clarence Coffee and Nella Tahrini, whilst production was handled by The Monsters & The Strangerz and Kelly Sheehan. Musically, "Sexercize" is a dubstep song that incorporates influences of urban-R&B and electronic dance music. The song's production was compared to songs by Barbadian singer Rihanna and from Minogue's tenth studio album X (2007). The lyrical content talks about sexual intercourse with a male partner, referencing the acts of sexercising.

Upon release, "Sexercize" polarized music commentators. Some critics applauded the rapping verse and the production, while many dismissed this and criticized the lyrical content and production, with some listing the song as their least favorite from Kiss Me Once. The song's official music video was directed by photographer Will Davidson. The second received favorable reviews from critics but received scrutiny from public commentators.

== Background ==
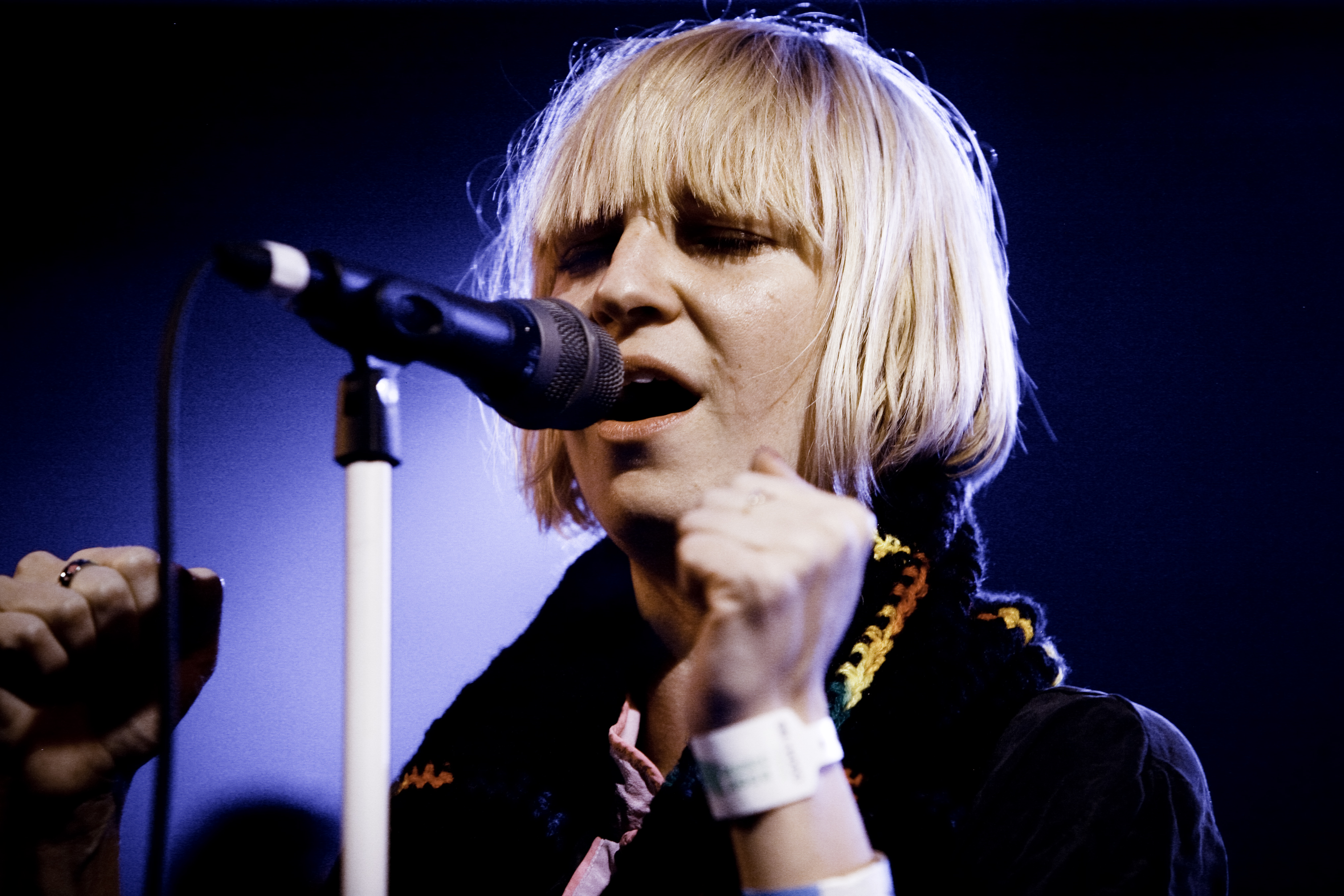
Australian singer Sia co-wrote the lyrics of the song.

Following the release of The Abbey Road Sessions (2012), Minogue split ways with her long-term manager, Terry Blamey and signed a new management deal with rapper Jay-Z's imprint Roc Nation. Following this new deal, Minogue continued work on her twelfth studio album throughout 2013, with reports emerging in February 2013 that Minogue had been working with singer-songwriter Sia.

The song was written by co-executive producer Sia, Marcus Lomax, Jordan Johnson, Stefan Johnson, Clarence Coffee and Nella Tahrini while production was handled by The Monsters & The Strangerz and Kelly Sheehan. The song was mastered by Geoff Pesche and mixed by Phil Tan and Daniela Rivera. According to Minogue, she said "I actually blushed when I heard the title and thought, 'Oh, that's wrong'. But that's the genius of Sia. She can made [sic] it cool and make it hot. And I can probably put the little wink into it, so you know it's going to be more fruity than sleazy." She added that the song was one of those the "fun tongue-in-cheek ones" from her album.

== Composition ==
Musically, "Sexercize" is a dubstep song that incorporates elements of R&B and electronic dance music. Ryan Lathan from PopMatters said that, while as a negative response; "The quivering electro-harp intro turns out to be one of the biggest come hither teases of the entire album, giving off the impression that some torrid, naughty storm is brewing ahead. It rolls right over. The chorus is negligible, the gauche 'Let's Get Physical' double entendres are eye-rollingly unsexy, and Minogue's delivery is too ladylike to deliver lines like, 'Feel the burn... Let me see you take it down. Let me see you take it up. Let me see you bounce, bounce, bounce, bounce... stretch it out baby.'" Kitty Empire from The Observer said that, lyrically, "It's so raunchy, it could just be an in-joke cooked up between Kylie and Sia Furler (who wrote the song, and exec-produced KMO). Lyrics such as 'feel the burn' suggest an STD, not ecstasy." Andy Gill from The Independent believed that "Sexercize" was an attempt to enter the American market with the contemporary use of dubstep.

Lyrically, the song talks about sexual intercourse with a partner, basically referencing the sexercizing technique. Neil McCormick from The Daily Telegraph said that "Sexercize", "Les Sex" and "Sexy Love" had attracted "youth markets still obsessed with dating rituals." Alexis Petridis examined that "'Sexercize', which gets itself into such a muddle trying to find sport-related metaphors for sex that it starts coming up with phrases that convey something other than what you suspect they're supposed to mean. "I want to see you beat all your best times," purrs Minogue: well, if you're absolutely sure that's what you want, I can probably be at the "finishing line", so to speak, in about 90 seconds flat."

== Critical reception ==
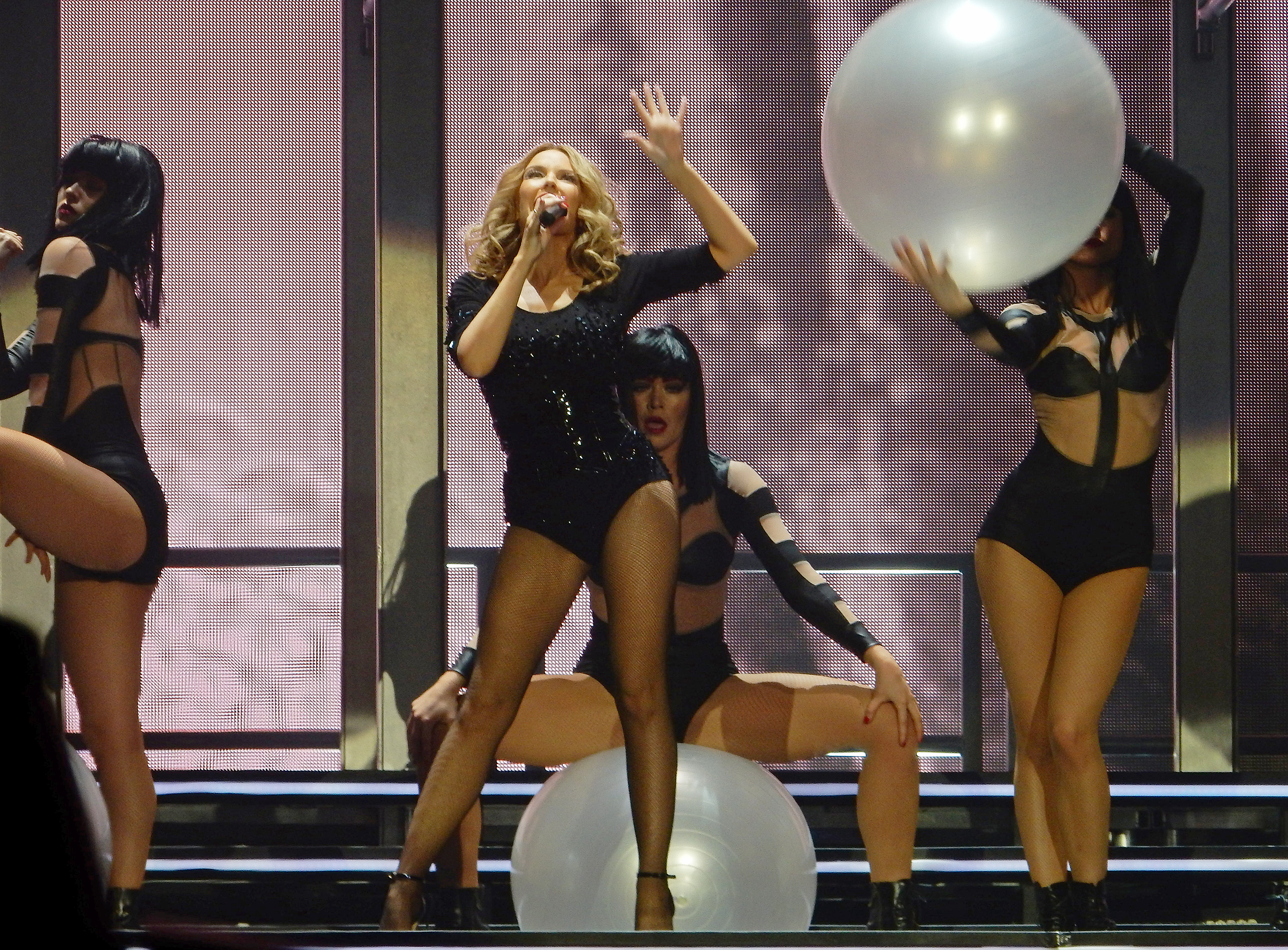
Minogue performing "Sexercise" during the Kiss Me Once Tour (2014)

"Sexercize" received generally mixed reviews from most music critics. Joe Sweeney from Slant Magazine said that while "Sexercize" and album track "Les Sex" were forgettable, "but none that truly ruin the party. Even the dubstep outlier 'Sexercize' works as a counterpoint to the album's deeper themes; as Minogue's maniacally digitized voice repeats the dumb/wonderful portmanteau over and over, her commitment to sounding temporarily insane is admirable." Tim Sendra from AllMusic exclaimed that "Sexercise" rises above some really dorky lyrics to actually sound kinda sexy in a robotic R&B kind of way." Chris Bosman from Consequence of Sound listed it as an "Essential Track", describing it as a "low-key dubstep seduction".

Negatively, Joe Muggs from Fact Magazine said that the song was a thumpy filler and said that "the ridiculous single – full of exhortations to 'feel the burn', 'stretch it out', 'beat all your best times' and well-oiled US dubstep gurgles and slithers – is low camp of the most glorious sort, turning every bro cliché into pure muscle Mary flex." Marc Hirsh from The Boston Globe was very negative, exclaiming that "Sexercize" could be the worst song Minogue has put out in well over a decade and felt it was the misstep of the album. Kitty Empire from The Observer said "[Kiss Me Once]'s contemporary American slant adds up to a handful of anonymous R&B filler tracks with 'sex' in the title. Case in point: rubbery sub-bass on the misfiring Sexercise, which belies a need to keep up with EDM's digital libidinousness." Annie Zaleski from The A.V. Club described the song as "cringe-worthy". Kevin Ritchie from Now found the song "weirdly-dated dubstep".

== Music videos ==
=== Music video ===
The official video for the song, an homage to the video for Olivia Newton-John's song "Physical", was directed by photographer Will Davidson and filmed at Carmel College in Oxfordshire, England. For the second video, Minogue's label spruiked the song in a statement which read: "In what can only be described as the hottest workout video ever, Kylie introduces her fans to the hot and steamy world of 'Sexercize'. Director Will Davidson, who also shot the viral video for 'Skirt', takes the viewer on a voyeuristic journey working out, sweating it up in the steam room and scenes that will no doubt see gym memberships soar." It was released on YouTube on 19 March.

=== Reception ===
Although the track was not well received by critics, the music video received favourable reception from music critics. Brett Malec from E! Online said "In the video (which contains a parental advisory warning at the start!), Minogue flaunts a super-fit and skinny bod in a skintight gymnastics leotard and stiletto heels. She runs her hands over her curves and poses seductively over a pummel horse." A reviewer from The Sydney Morning Herald described it as "X-Rated" and that "Kylie Minogue is set to stun her fans by releasing an X-rated new promo in which she writhes with four women during a sex workout." The Huffington Post compared it to "Spinning Around", writing "Ever since Kylie Minogue's perfectly formed derrière and a pair of now-legendary gold hot pants helped catapult her back onto the pop scene back in 2000 in the video for 'Spinning Around', we've been wondering when her bottom would next be putting in an appearance - and the wait is finally over."

=== Video website ===
On 20 March 2014, Minogue launched the sexercize.tv website, created to showcase "Sexercize" through the eyes of other collaborators such as Hattie Stewart × Chandelier, VFiles × Cody Critcheloe, Starsky + Cox, Mat Maitland × Jean Paul Gaultier, Gregoire Alexandre × Le Specs, Reilly × Dolce & Gabbana, National Geographic × Chandelier, and Roman Coppola × Maserati.

== Live performances ==
In March 2014, Minogue performed "Sexercize" on the French TV show Le Grand Journal in Paris, France. Minogue performed the song on her Kiss Me Once Tour in the fourth section, "Lick Kiss", following a cover of "Need You Tonight".

== Personnel ==
Credits below are adapted from the liner notes on Kiss Me Once from Discogs.

- Additional vocals and vocal producer – Kelly 'Madame Buttons' Sheehan
- Assistant mixing – Daniela Rivera
- Mastered by Geoff Pesche
- Mixed by Phil Tan
- Producer – The Monsters & Strangerz
- Written by Clarence Coffee, Jordan Johnson, Marcus Lomax, Nella Tahriri, Sia, Stefan Johnson

== Charts ==
Chart (2014)	Peak position
CIS Airplay (TopHit)	167
US Hot Dance/Electronic Songs (Billboard)	30
