= Timebomb (Kylie Minogue song) =

2012 single by Kylie Minogue

Single by Kylie Minogue
- Released: 25 May 2012
- Studio: Destined Studios (London)
- Genre: Dance-pop
- Length: 2:57
- Label: Parlophone
- Songwriters: Karen Poole; Matt Schwartz; Paul Harris
- Producers: Matt Schwartz; Paul Harris

Kylie Minogue singles chronology
"Put Your Hands Up (If You Feel Love)" (2011)	"Timebomb" (2012)	"Flower" (2012)

Music video
- "Timebomb" on YouTube

"Timebomb" is a song recorded by Australian singer Kylie Minogue. It was written by Karen Poole, Matt Schwartz, and Paul Harris, with Schwartz and Harris also handling production. A surprise release, both the track and its music video were digitally unveiled via a viral Twitter campaign on 25 May 2012. Parlophone distributed the single as part of a celebration of Minogue's 25th anniversary in the music industry. The single saw a physical release and an accompanying digital remix EP in July.

Music critics identified "Timebomb" as an energetic dance-pop song with a thematic focus on seizing the day and dancing. The song's production received widespread praise, with some reviewers considering it among Minogue's finest works. "Timebomb" achieved moderate commercial success across Europe, Asia, and Australia. In the United States, it marked Minogue's ninth number-one hit on the Billboard Dance Club Songs chart. The single also earned Gold certification in Italy.

Directed by Christian Larson, an accompanying music video follows Minogue through the streets of Soho, London. Her sex appeal in the video garnered significant attention from critics. To promote the single, Minogue performed it during the first season of The Voice UK. The song also featured in the setlists for her Kiss Me Once (2014–15) and Tension (2025) concert tours. "Timebomb" was included in a 2012 box set and made its debut on a globally released album with Step Back in Time: The Definitive Collection (2019).

== Background and composition ==
In 2012, Minogue launched K25, a commemorative program celebrating her 25-year career in the music industry. The year-long campaign included monthly video releases on her official website, and the launch of the Anti Tour in March and April. "Timebomb" was released as part of the K25 project. The track was written by Karen Poole, Matt Schwartz and Paul Harris, whilst the latter two collaborators handled its production. (Note: American singer Michael Jackson wrote a track, also titled "Timebomb", for Minogue's Fever (2001); however, the 2012 song was not written by Jackson.) "Timebomb" was recorded at Destined Studios at West End London by Schwartz, who also served as the track programmer and mixing engineer. Poole provided backing vocals. It is written in the key of G major and is set in common time with a tempo of 128 beats per minute. Minogue's vocals span between G4 and G5.

Musically, "Timebomb" is a dance-pop song that is driven by a distorted electronic bassline, pulsing beat, ticking drums, and persistent synths. The track also incorporates disco and electro elements. The song surges into an energetic chorus, punctuated by Minogue's chants of "whoops". Her vocals are heavily processed throughout the track, leading Billboard's Andrew Hampp to compare her breathy, robotic delivery to an electropop version of Ann-Margret. Robert Moran of The Sydney Morning Herald described "Timebomb" as a "stomping track with some indie sleaze stench to it". Cameron Adams from Herald Sun perceived the production as "dark and dirty", while Melina Newman from HitFix and Josh Martin from MTV Australia found similarities to The Bloody Beetroots and the early work of Madonna, respectively. Digital Spy's Robert Copsey felt the upbeat production recalled Minogue's own earlier work, particularly her 2001 songs "Come Into My World" and "Love At First Sight".

The lyrics of the song focus on seizing the day and dancing ("Do you wanna dance like it was the last dance?"). Marc Andrews, the author of Kylie Song by Song (2022), described "Timebomb" as an ode to apocalypse, while Jenn Selby of Glamour noted its camp elements. Jude Rogers of The Quietus pointed out that the chorus could be interpreted as an allusion to sex, though he argued that the song's central theme is the urgency of aging, a sentiment Minogue previously explored in "All the Lovers" (2010). For Copsey, the theme about the rapid passage of time resonated deeply, given the commemoration of Minogue's 25-year career.

== Release ==
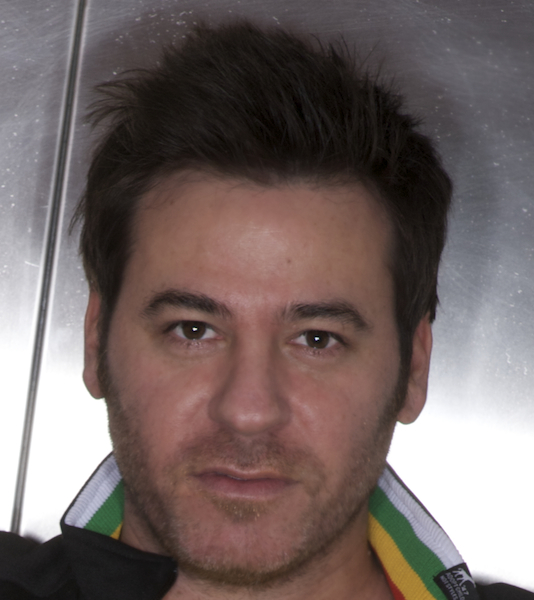
Record producer Matt Schwartz (pictured in 2009) co-wrote, co-produced, and did a remix of "Timebomb"

"Timebomb" was intended for The Best of Kylie Minogue, a 2012 greatest hits album, but it was ultimately excluded when Parlophone opted for a fan-voted tracklist. On 25 May 2012, Minogue initiated a social media campaign using a countdown timer on her website and the hashtag "KylieTimebomb" on Twitter. Fans quickly met the 25,000 tweet target in under 45 minutes, successfully unlocking the new track. At its peak, the hashtag reached 10 tweets per second, making it the top trending topic worldwide in just six minutes. Upon reaching the tweet target, "Timebomb" was unveiled with a music video and simultaneously became available on iTunes and Spotify. This led several publications to label "Timebomb" a surprise release. Syd Lawrence, the campaign developer, declared it the biggest of the three "tweet to unlock" campaigns undertaken for the K25 project, emphasizing its low budget and effectiveness in reaching a large fan audience. Alexis Petridis of The Guardian contended that the release felt like "an afterthought", being overshadowed by Minogue's other 25th-anniversary releases and her Anti Tour.

The digital single was an iTunes Store exclusive, available for download until 30 May. "Timebomb" was sent to radio stations in New Zealand on 29 May. On 13 July, Parlophone issued a digital EP of "Timebomb" remixes, including an extended mix and five remixes by record producers Peter Rauhofer, (Note: Rauhofer's remix was one of his final projects before his passing in 2013.) Matt Schwartz (credited as DADA), Italia3, Style of Eye, Steve Redant and Phil Romano. On 16 July, due to high demand, Parlophone distributed a CD single that included the original recording, an extended version, and an enhanced music video. The release was limited to 5,000 copies worldwide, with 10 of those copies signed by Minogue herself. "Timebomb" later appeared as a mini CD on Minogue's box set compilation K25: Time Capsule in October 2012. The track was included in Step Back in Time: The Definitive Collection, a greatest hits album distributed by BMG in 2019, marking its first inclusion on a worldwide-released album.

== Critical reception ==
Music critics lauded the production of "Timebomb", particularly its "whoops" hook and catchy chorus. Anderson praised the enticing "precision-calibrated rave", while Joey Guerra of Houston Chronicle found the track a worthy addition to Minogue's "near-perfect pop canon". Melinda Newman of HitFix commented that the lighthearted track was a suitable continuation of the K25 celebration. Hampp and Newsday's Glenn Gamboa noticed the track's potential to boost Minogue's recognition in the US market, with Gamboa labelling the track a "pure fizzy dance pop". Describing the track as an "aural candy", Craig Takeuchi of The Georgia Straight predicted it would become one of Pride Month's club anthems.

Several critics deemed the track a fitting choice for song of the summer, including Guerra, AfterElton.com's Louis Virtel, and The Boston Globe's Sarah Rodman. Virtel picked "Timebomb" as the best dance song of 2012, praising it as "a note-perfect, three-minute pop bullet." In retrospect, Sam Damshenas from Gay Times recognized "Timebomb" as one of the most underrated pop singles, highlighting its pulsating beat and Minogue's performance "at her most fast and furious". Many publications ranked "Timebomb" among Minogue's best tracks, including Classic Pop, Gay Times, The Guardian, MTV Australia, NewNowNext, and The Sydney Morning Herald.

== Chart performance ==
"Timebomb" entered the UK Singles Chart at number 31, selling 10,044 units in its first two days. It remained at the same position for a second week before dropping to number 56. The single had non-consecutive runs in the top 100 for a total of 7 weeks. A fan favourite track, "Timebomb" ranked within the top 40 most-loved songs by Minogue in a UK poll conducted by BBC Radio 2 in 2023. It was one of Minogue's top 40 biggest selling songs in the UK by May 2018. In Australia, "Timebomb" topped the ARIA Dance Singles Chart and debuted at number 12 on the Singles Chart, becoming Minogue's best-performing single on the latter chart since "Wow" (2008). The single fell to number 49 the following week, marking its final chart appearance on the Singles Chart. Similarly, in New Zealand, it spent a sole week on the chart at number 33, her first solo appearance since "2 Hearts" (2007). In Europe, "Timebomb" peaked within the top 60 on charts in Austria (58), Finland (11), France (46), Germany (56), Hungary (19), Ireland (26), Italy (23), the Netherlands (44), Scotland (33), Spain (20), and the Belgium regions of Flanders (43) and Wallonia (49). The single was certified gold by Federazione Industria Musicale Italiana in July 2012.

The single succeeded in the US Dance charts, becoming her ninth number-one entry on the Dance Club Songs during the week of 11 August. It was her sixth consecutive chart-topper. "Timebomb" also reached number 17 on both of Billboards Dance/Electronic Digital Songs and the Dance/Mix Show Airplay chart. In Canada, it peaked at number 40 and number 73 on the Canadian Digital Songs chart and Canadian Hot 100. Elsewhere, the single peaked at number 9 on the Billboard Global Dance Tracks, and appeared on the airplay charts in the Commonwealth of Independent States (70), Lebanon (12), Mexico (49), and Russia (93). In Japan, it was Minogue's first entry on the Billboard Japan Hot 100 since its inception in 2008, peaking at number 32. (Note: Minogue has appeared on Japan's Oricon Singles Chart since her 1988 single, "I Should Be So Lucky". Billboard launched the Japan Hot 100 chart in 2008.) By the end of 2012, "Timebomb" appeared in the year-end dance charts in Australia (39), and the US (18).

== Music video ==
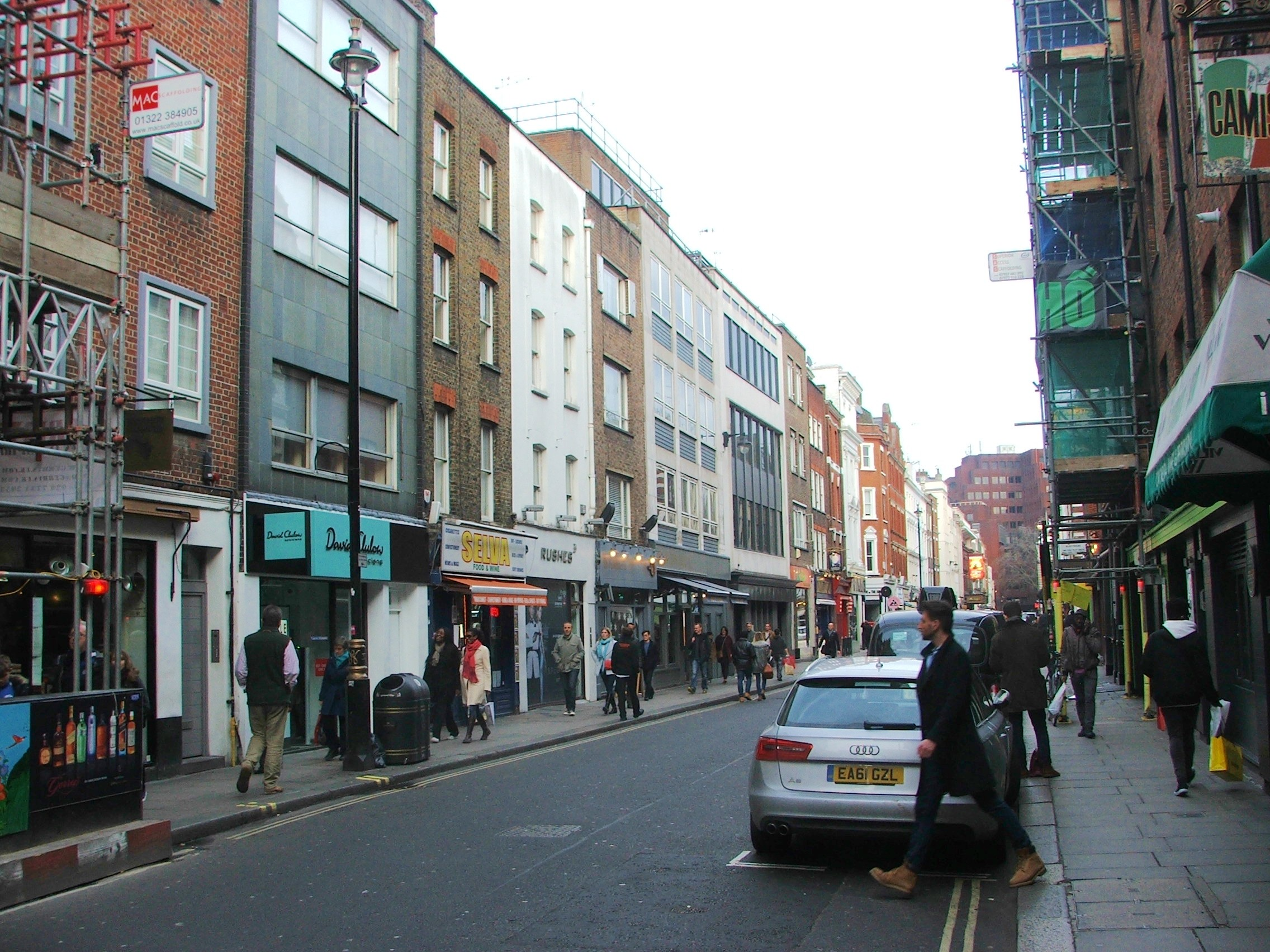
Filming for "Timebomb" took place partly on London's Old Compton Street (pictured in 2015), where the shoot drew a large crowd of fans.

Christian Larson directed and edited the music video for "Timebomb", which primarily took place in Soho, London in April 2012. Details about the filming were not confirmed before its release, and Minogue used a code name for the project during production. "It was like organizing the biggest surprise party," she said. Shooting session on the bustling Old Compton Street, however, caused a commotion. Minogue, using an in-ear monitor, mimed to the song as she walked down the street, drawing a large crowd of fans. Recalling the experience, she said, "I must have looked like a complete idiot strutting down the street singing to absolutely nothing!"

A nighttime sequence featuring Minogue on the back of a motorbike was filmed in a Chinatown back alley. She found the scene the most challenging, as the bike's noise drowned out the music and the fumes were overpowering. Despite this, she enjoyed filming it. According to Minogue, the black spandex minidress in the video was purchased from a sex shop for £15. She expressed discomfort towards the dress, described it as "a very cheeky little outfit... I do get very shy and timid [about it]".

The video employs rapid cuts between scenes in colour and black-and-white. It opens with Minogue wearing a leather biker jacket adorned with a giant red heart, short denim hot pants, and a pair of sunglasses. She arrives at a dimly lit nightclub, before walking down Old Compton Street. The street scenes were filmed with a found-footage aesthetic. She climbs into an open-top sports car with a male driver, and they journey through London's bustling streets. As night falls, Minogue is pursued by an unknown man. She finds herself in an abandoned warehouse, and removes her jacket, revealing the black minidress. Minogue can be seen dancing seductively next to a motorcycle, while the man circles her, performing a wheelie. The video ends with the pair performing a burnout.

The music video was unveiled via the viral release campaign on Twitter on 25 May. Minogue promoted the Facebook app that that let fans insert their own images into her sunglasses in the music video. The video attracted 10 million views on Vevo by 7 August. The black minidress, along with Minogue's physique, drew attention from media publications. Both Michael Baggs of Gigwise and Jenna Rubenstein of MTV Buzzworthy praised the video's sensual elements, while MTV UK considered it to contain some of her most raunchiest scenes. Gamboa and a writer from HuffPost commended the memorable video, with the latter describing it as "pure Kylie at her best."

== Live performances ==
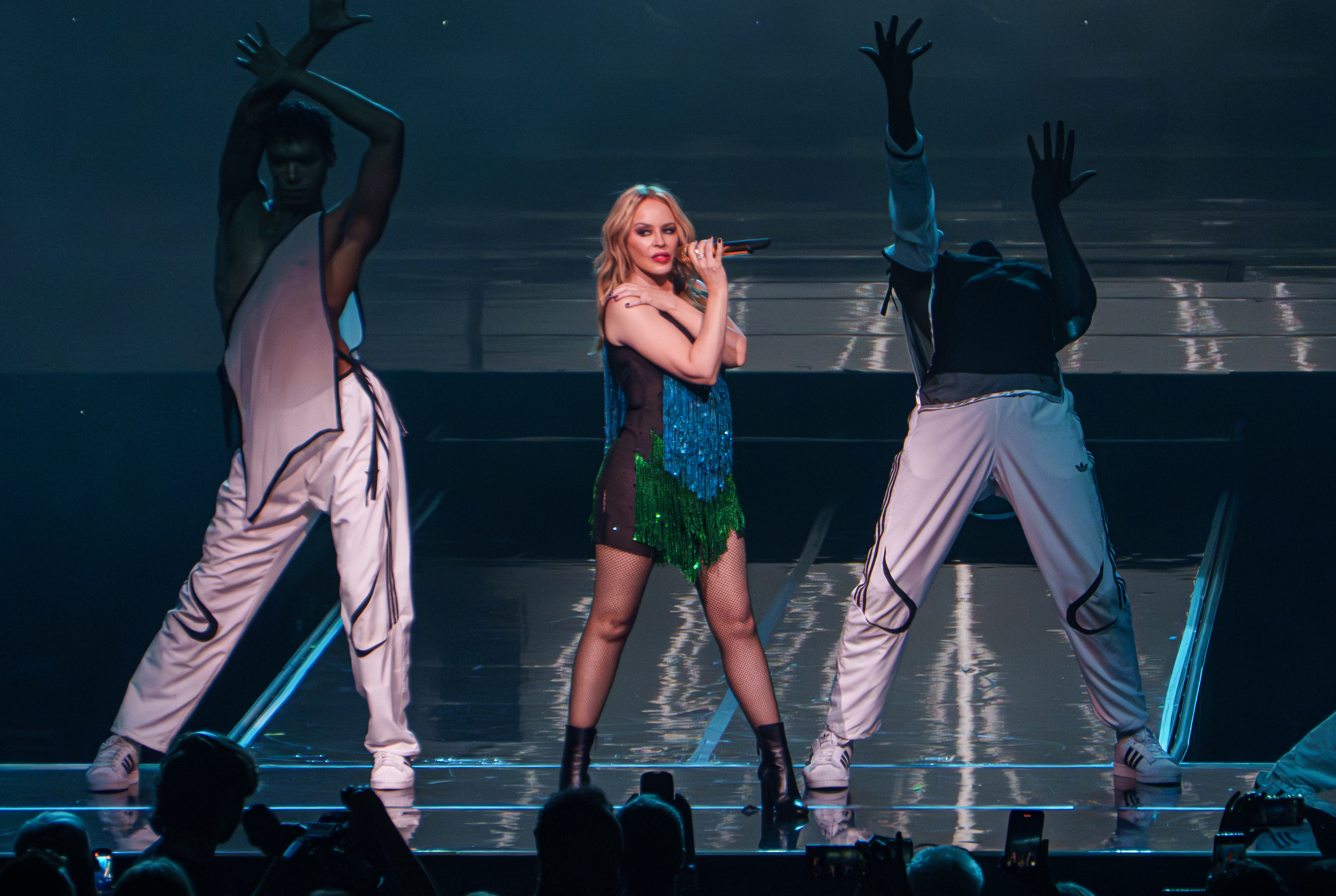
Minogue performing "Timebomb" on 2025's Tension Tour

On 27 May 2012, Minogue performed "Timebomb" for the first time on the first season of The Voice UK. She wore the denim hotpants and a leather jacket, before changing into the black minidress halfway through the performance.

The song was included on the setlist for her 2014 Kiss Me Once Tour in Europe and Australia. The performance featured Minogue dressed in a red sparkling corset and matching pillbox hat, designed by Dolce & Gabbana. She was accompanied by dancers in skin-tight black and white costumes, accented with red sequinned pasties. In his review for Financial Times, Ludovic Hunter-Tilney was unimpressed with what he perceived as mediocre performance, and described the choreography as uninspired. A show in SSE Hydro, Glasgow was filmed on 12 November, and released as a live album in March 2015. The performance of "Timebomb" was uploaded to Minogue's official YouTube account on 4 March 2015 as a sneak peek for the live album release.

In 2025, Minogue included the track on the fourth segment of her sixteenth concert tour, the Tension Tour. Reviewing the tour's live album, Attitude's Aaron Sugg described the performance as "pure energy, with [Kylie's] stage presence transferring through".

== Credits and personnel ==
Credits adapted from the CD liner notes of "Timebomb"

Recording

- Mixed and recorded at Destined Studios, London, England by Matt Schwartz

Personnel

- Kylie Minogue – vocals
- Karen Poole – songwriter, vocal production, backing vocals
- Paul Harris – songwriter, producer, instruments, arrangement, vocal production, programming, mixing assistant, recording assistant
- Matt Schwartz – songwriter, producer, instruments, arrangement, vocal production, programming, guitar, mixing, recording

== Charts ==
=== Weekly charts ===
2012–2013 weekly chart performance for "Timebomb"
Chart (2012–2013)	Peak position
Australia (ARIA)	12
Australian Dance (ARIA)	1
Austria (Ö3 Austria Top 40)	58
Belgium (Ultratop 50 Flanders)	43
Belgium (Ultratop 50 Wallonia)	49
Canada Hot 100 (Billboard)	73
CIS Airplay (TopHit)	70
Czech Republic Airplay (ČNS IFPI)	89
Finland Downloads (Latauslista)	11
France (SNEP)	46
Germany (GfK)	56
Global Dance Tracks (Billboard)	9
Hungary (Rádiós Top 40)	19
Ireland (IRMA)	26
Italy (FIMI)	23
Japan Hot 100 (Billboard)	32
Lebanon (Lebanese Top 20)	12
Mexico (Billboard Mexican Airplay)	49
Netherlands (Single Top 100)	44
New Zealand (Recorded Music NZ)	33
Russia Airplay (TopHit)	93
Scottish Singles Sales (Official Charts)	33
Spain (Promusicae)	20
UK Singles (Official Charts)	31
US Dance Club Songs (Billboard)	1
US Dance/Electronic Digital Songs (Billboard)	17
US Dance Airplay (Billboard)	17

=== Year-end charts ===
2012 year-end chart performance for "Timebomb"
Chart (2012)	Position
Australian Dance (ARIA)	39
US Dance Club Songs (Billboard)	18

== Certifications ==
Certifications for "Timebomb"
Region	Certification	Certified units/sales
Italy (FIMI)	Gold	15,000^{*}
^{*} Sales figures based on certification alone.

== Release history ==
Release dates and formats for "Timebomb"
Region	Date	Format	Label
Australasia	25 May 2012	Digital download	Parlophone
Japan	25 May 2012	Digital download	Parlophone
United Kingdom	25 May 2012	Digital download	Parlophone
Ireland	25 May 2012	Digital download	Parlophone
Europe	25 May 2012	Digital download	Parlophone
Taiwan	25 May 2012	Digital download	Parlophone
Italy	25 May 2012	Contemporary hit radio	Warner Music
North America	25 May 2012	Digital download	Parlophone
Australasia	13 July 2012	Digital download (Remixes)	Parlophone
Japan	13 July 2012	Digital download (Remixes)	Parlophone
United Kingdom	13 July 2012	Digital download (Remixes)	Parlophone
Ireland	13 July 2012	Digital download (Remixes)	Parlophone
Europe	13 July 2012	Digital download (Remixes)	Parlophone
North America	13 July 2012	Digital download (Remixes)	Parlophone
Worldwide	25 May 2012	CD	Parlophone

== See also ==
- List of number-one dance singles of 2012 (U.S.)
- List of number-one dance singles of 2012 (Australia)
