= Christian Larson (director) =

Swedish director, editor and photographer

Christian Larson is a Swedish film and music video director, editor and photographer.

Larson's work includes music videos for Sigur Rós, Seinabo Sey, Kylie Minogue and Icona Pop, as well as commercials and editorials for Cartier, Pepsi, H&M, Mercedes-Benz, Lexus, Beats by Dre, CDLP, L'Oreal and Agent Provocateur. In 2010 he made the documentary Take One that reached cult status in the electronic dance music world, dubbed »Spinal Tap for the acid house generation« by The Times UK. In 2012 he wrote and directed Valtari, a short film with music from the Icelandic band Sigur Rós and choreography from world-renowned choreographer Sidi Larbi Cherkoui. The film received numerous nominations and was awarded a Swedish Grammy for Best Video at the 2013 Swedish Grammy Awards as well as Best Choreography at the 2013 UK Music Video Awards.

His first feature-length film Leave The World Behind was officially selected to the 2014 SXSW Film Festival in Austin, Texas. When officially released on iTunes, it went straight to number 1 in the worldwide documentary section.

Larson is also known for his collaborations as a film editor together with Swedish director Jonas Åkerlund on projects like the Emmy nominated HBO concert film On The Run featuring Beyoncé & Jay-Z and the music video Telephone featuring Lady Gaga.

In 2016, he co-founded the Swedish premium men's underwear brand CDLP. The brand has been featured in Esquire, GQ, Vogue, Man about Town, New York Times and How To Spend It – Financial Times, and is sold through some of the world’s leading retailers, including Barneys New York, Selfridges London and Mr. Porter.

== Filmography ==
- "Leave The World Behind" (2014)
- Valtari short film with music by Sigur Rós (2012)
- "Take One - A documentary about Swedish House Mafia", EMI" (2011)

== Commercials ==
- Pepsi - Black
- Cartier - Juste un Clou
- Lexus - Statement
- Mercedes-Benz - Burning Desire
- H&M - Back to school
- CDLP - Built to take off
- Agent Provocateur - Le Salon
- RFSU - Carefree

== Videography ==
- "Emergency" by Icona Pop (2015)
- "On my way / Can't hold us down" by Axwell and Ingrosso (2015)
- "Pistols At Dawn" by Seinabo Sey (2014)
- "Timebomb" by Kylie Minogue (2012)
- "Make Your Own Rhythm" by Florrie (2012)
