= Skirt (song) =

2013 promotional single by Kylie Minogue

- Remixes EP cover (Note: The artwork, revealed on Nom de Strip's SoundCloud and issued through physical promo copies, depicts Minogue behind a curtain near a slide-door. The picture was taken from Davidson's photoshoot. The iTunes cover has Minogue's name superimposed on a black "+" symbol, with the Rising Music label on the top left corner.)

Promotional single by Kylie Minogue
- Released: 24 June 2013
- Recorded: 2013
- Genre: EDM; dubstep; house-pop
- Length: 3:29
- Label: Rising Music
- Songwriters: Chris Lake; Chris Elliot; Terius Nash; Minogue
- Producer: Nom de Strip (Note: Chris Elliot used the stage name Nom de Strip when he released "Shake & Bake" with DJ Bones in 2012. Elliot went on to produce "Skirt" with Marco Lys, both credited as Nom de Strip. DJ Bones, however, was not listed as the track's songwriter by the American Society of Composers, Authors and Publishers.)

Lyric video
- "Skirt" on YouTube

"Skirt" is a 2013 song recorded by Australian singer Kylie Minogue. She co-wrote the song with Chris Elliot, Chris Lake, and The-Dream, while Elliot and Marco Lys produced it. "Skirt" samples "Shake & Bake", a composition by Elliot and DJ Bones. The track premiered on Elliot's SoundCloud account on 28 May 2013—Minogue's 45th birthday—before it was released as a stand-alone promotional single on 24 June. (Note: In several interviews in 2013 and 2014, Minogue referred to "Skirt" as a "buzz track".) The distribution of the single, both physically and digitally as a remix EP, was handled by Rising Music, an independent record label established by Lake.

"Skirt" is an EDM, dubstep, and house-pop track. The lyrics portray Minogue seducing someone by dropping her skirt. Music critics commended its production and Minogue's return to mainstream dance music. The track was Minogue's tenth number-one single on the US Billboard Dance Club Songs chart. In order to promote the single, an accompanying lyric video was published in June 2013, featuring more than 1,000 stills of her inside a hotel room.

== Background and production ==
In February 2012, DJ Bones and Chris Elliot (under the stage name Nom de Strip) released a two-track EP under the independent label DirtyNitrus. The EP features an instrumental composition titled "Shake & Bake" on the B-side. Elliot wrote "Shake & Bake" using Logic Pro while he was working in music shops. In 2013, Elliot caught the attention of British producer Chris Lake, who signed him to Rising Music, his Los Angeles-based independent label. That year, Australian singer Kylie Minogue announced she had signed a management deal with Roc Nation, an entertainment agency handled by American rapper and businessman Jay-Z. The announcement was made after she parted ways with her long-term manager Terry Blamey and the British label EMI.

During the summer of 2013, Minogue and her manager had a chance meeting with Lake, who played a set for them. Minogue selected "Shake & Bake" from that set, and recorded the instrumental track with Elliot and American songwriter The-Dream later that night. RocNation introduced the singer to The-Dream, with whom she spent a few days co-writing the track. Elliot and his label-mate Marco Lys co-produced the track. Lake was pleased with the working experience with Minogue. He found the bass-heavy production different from Minogue's previous work and challenging for her casual listeners.

== Composition ==
"Skirt" is an EDM, dubstep, and house-pop song. It is written in the key of D major and has a moderately fast tempo of 128 beats per minute. The track has sparse production between the verses and is anchored by a bass-laden hook, which comes more than a minute into the track and appears only twice. It opens with muffled electronic beats, and features instrumentation of keyboards, synthesizers, and a drum machine. "Skirt" has no middle-eight section, and the beat drop builds up to Minogue singing the chorus. Minogue's vocals are breathy, distorted, and synthesized; she can be heard moaning and sighing towards the end of the track. At one point, Minogue chants "Down, down, down, down" over the heavy bass production. The-Dream also contributed background vocals, making breathy exclamations at the 2:03 mark.

Music critics described "Skirt" as more experimental than Minogue's other work. Alexis L. Loinaz of E! Online said that the track delivers "a harder, driving sound" compared to what Minogue's audience might have expected from her. The Tab's Harrison Brocklehurst noted that the track contains elements of dubstep, which Minogue had not previously incorporated into her music. Writers of The Sydney Morning Herald compared its abrasive production to the work of British producer Sophie. Lyrically, Minogue sings about dropping her skirt before initiating a sexual encounter. Brocklehurst called it "a sexually charged anthem", and Logo TV's Simon Curtis compared the sexual theme to Minogue's "Slow" (2003).

== Release and remixes ==
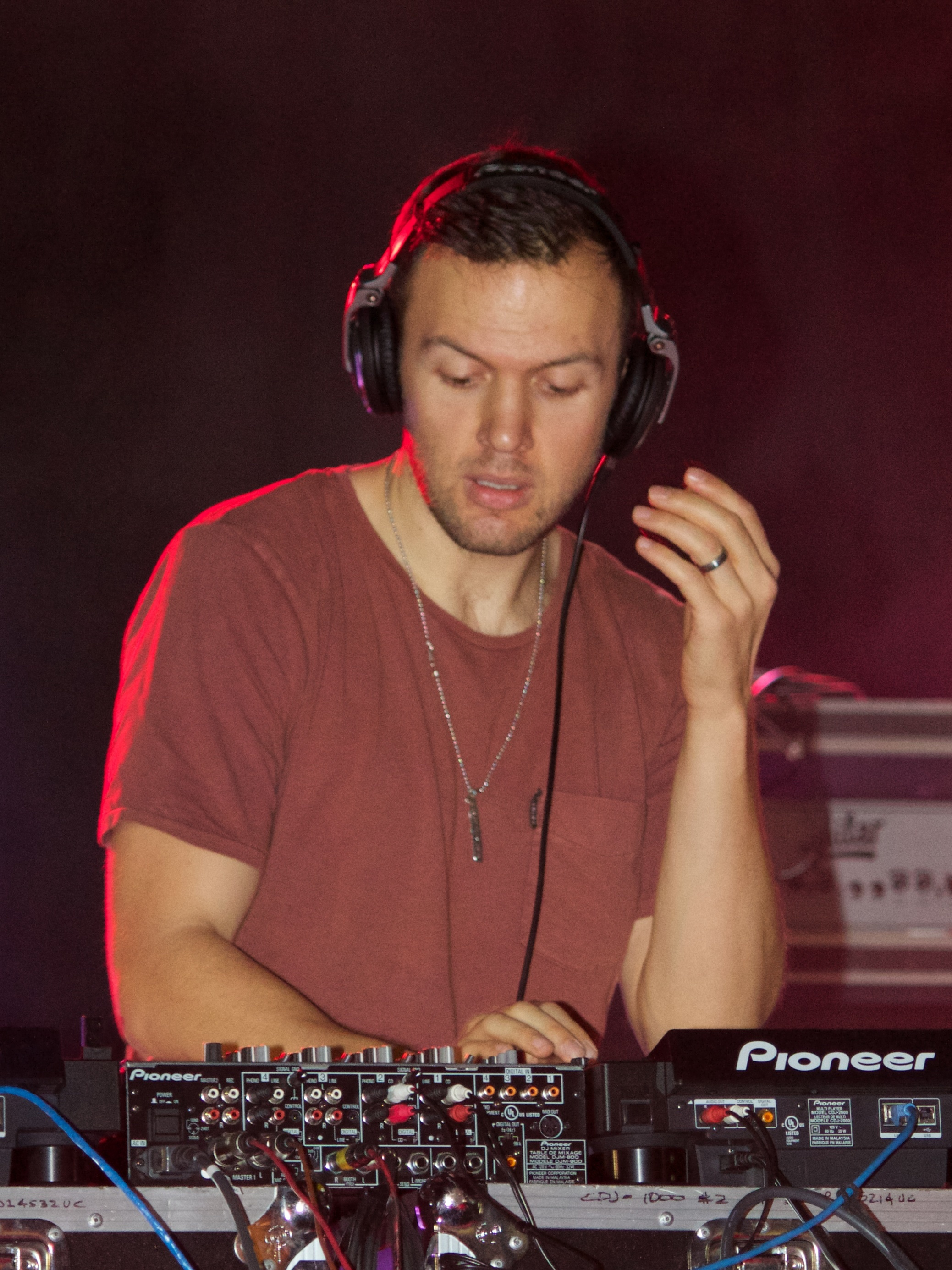
British producer Chris Lake (pictured in 2012) co-wrote and released "Skirt" as a remix EP under his independent label Rising Music.

In February 2013, Minogue confirmed working on her twelfth studio album and a new single. Elliot first played "Skirt" during his set at the Pacha Ibiza nightclub before the track's premiere on his SoundCloud account on 28 May 2013, Minogue's 45th birthday. The release was made without any prior official announcement; Minogue revealed the track with a post on Twitter: "Birthday surprise!!". "Skirt" was released as a promotional single ahead of Minogue's twelfth studio album, Kiss Me Once. In July 2013, she confirmed the track was only a teaser. "I'd like to think of it as being the amuse-bouche of the meal. Your entire meal's not going to be like that; my album's not going to be like that," says Minogue. The track was ultimately not included on Kiss Me Once.

Lake released the track and its accompanying remixes under his label Rising Music. The label distributed "Skirt" as a digital EP on 24 June 2013, exclusively through Beatport. The EP included four remixes individually produced by Nom de Strip, electronic duo GTA, English DJ Switch, and American DJ Hot Mouth. Nom de Strip's remix expanded upon the original dubstep production, while GTA and Hot Mouth were influenced by rave and electronic dance music. Switch's remix is a robotic house-influenced track. The EP was physically released in China by EMI and Gold Typhoon. Rising Music distributed the physical EP in the UK, which featured remixes by American producers Matthew Dear and Mark Picchiotti. Dear announced his remix on his SoundCloud account in early July. A remix by Australian duo Cut Snake was made available on Minogue's SoundCloud account as a free giveaway in July 2013.

== Reception ==
"Skirt" was met with mostly positive reviews from music critics, who appreciated Minogue's fresh take on dance music. Sal Cinquemani of Slant Magazine found the track "quintessential Kylie" despite its edgy production. Described it as a "forward-thinking slice of electronic brilliance", Curtis suggested that Minogue is on the cusp of a long-awaited artistic breakthrough. Fact magazine offered a mixed review, criticizing the brash production and mid-range synthesizer sounds. Billboard magazine picked the Switch remix as the best track on the remix EP, praising the producer for creating a "soft, warm embrace to the original, turning the sexual into the sensual". The magazine also named "Skirt" as one of the "Top 50 Game-Changing EDM Tracks of 2013", ranked at number 36.

Brocklehurst, in his retrospective review, stated the track is among Minogue's most adventurous and overlooked, praising its modern production and chorus. In contrast, Simon Mills of the Herald Sun perceived the track as "cold, camp-free, and unsettling," and noted that the Americanization of Minogue was not successful. Graham Gremore of Queerty drew a positive comparison between the track and Minogue's "Padam Padam" (2023), noting they intriguingly complement each other. Brocklehurst and Slant Magazine's Alexa Camp believe that "Skirt" should have been included in Kiss Me Once. The Sydney Morning Herald, The Tab and Classic Pop listed "Skirt" among their top Minogue tracks.

"Skirt" peaked atop of US Billboard Dance Club Songs chart during the week of 14 September. "Skirt" became Minogue's tenth number one, and her seventh consecutive number one since August 2010 with "All the Lovers". Overall, it was present on the chart for 13 weeks. "Skirt" spent 10 weeks on the Hot Dance/Electronic Songs, reaching its peak at number 31 on 24 August. By the end of 2013, "Skirt" was ranked number 23 on Billboard's annual Dance Club Songs chart, and number 75 on the annual Dance/Electronic Songs chart.

== Promotion ==
On 14 June 2013, an accompanying stop-motion lyric video was published on Nowness and YouTube. Directed and photographed by Will Davidson, the video is a series of quick cuts of over 1,000 still photos of Minogue seductively posing in a hotel room. During the video, Minogue moves around the floor, arches her back, and stares straight into the camera. She wears a tight-fitting Alexander Wang black dress and Jimmy Choo stilettos. The three-hour shoot took place in Los Angeles a week before its premiere. Minogue was impressed by Davidson's natural approach, saying: "In 25 years I haven't done anything like this ... They feel real, unprocessed and much like the viewer is there with me." Curtis praised Davidson for making a "deceptively simple, yet beautiful" video, while HitFix's Melinda Newman felt that it would "either flip yours up or induce a seizure." A picture from Davidson's photoshoot was used as the remix EP's artwork. A second visual was used as an interlude featurette on Minogue's Kiss Me Once Tour. A two-minute video was also included on the live DVD, titled Kiss Me Once Live at the SSE Hydro, as a bonus feature.

== Track listings ==
- Digital and Europe remix EP
1. "Skirt" (Main Mix) – 3:29
2. "Skirt" (Extended Mix) – 4:47
3. "Skirt" (Nom De Strip Dub Mix) – 4:48
4. "Skirt" (GTA Remix) – 5:10
5. "Skirt" (Switch Remix) – 5:33
6. "Skirt" (Hot Mouth Remix) – 4:43
- UK remix EP
1. "Skirt" (Main Mix) – 3:29
2. "Skirt" (Extended Mix) – 4:47
3. "Skirt" (Nom De Strip Extended) – 6:07
4. "Skirt" (Nom De Strip Mix Show) – 4:49
5. "Skirt" (Nom De Strip Dub) – 4:50
6. "Skirt" (Matthew Dear Remix) – 5:16
7. "Skirt" (Stop Me Shake Me Remix) – 5:16
8. "Skirt" (Switch Remix) – 5:33
9. "Skirt" (Hot Mouth Remix) – 4:43
10. "Skirt" (GTA Remix) – 5:10
11. "Skirt" (K & NDS Remix) – 3:30
- Chinese remix EP
1. "Skirt" (Main Mix) – 3:29
2. "Skirt" (Extended Mix) – 4:47
3. "Skirt" (Nom De Strip Dub Mix) – 4:48
4. "Skirt" (GTA Remix) – 5:10
5. "Skirt" (Switch Remix) – 5:33
6. "Skirt" (Hot Mouth Remix) – 4:43
7. "Skirt" (George M Dub Bootleg Mix) – 7:07
8. "Skirt" (Official Extended Mix) – 4:47
9. "Skirt" (Remastered) – 3:30
10. "Skirt" (Richie Bardot Dub) – 5:22
11. "Skirt" (Stopme Shake Mix) – 5:15

== Personnel ==
Credits are adapted from the American Society of Composers, Authors and Publishers.

- Kylie Minogue – vocals, songwriting
- Chris Elliot – songwriting, production
- Marco Lys – production
- Chris Lake – songwriting
- Terius "The Dream" Nash – songwriting, background vocals

== Charts ==
=== Weekly charts ===
Weekly chart performance for "Skirt" in 2013
Chart (2013)	Peak position
US Dance Club Songs (Billboard)	1
US Hot Dance/Electronic Songs (Billboard)	31

=== Year-end chart ===
Year-end chart performance for "Skirt" in 2013
Chart (2013)	Position
US Dance Club Songs (Billboard)	23
US Hot Dance/Electronic Songs (Billboard)	75

== Release history ==
Release dates and formats for "Skirt"
Region	Date	Format	Label	Ref.
Various	28 May 2013	Streaming	—	
Various	24 June 2013	Digital download	Rising Music	
China	2013	CD single	EMI; Gold Typhoon	
United Kingdom	2013	CD single	Rising Music	

== See also ==
- List of Billboard Dance Club Songs number ones of 2013
