= Kiss Me Once Tour =

2014–15 concert tour by Kylie Minogue

- Tour by Kylie Minogue
- Promotional poster for the tour
- Location: Europe; Oceania; Asia
- Associated album: Kiss Me Once
- Start date: 24 September 2014
- End date: 28 March 2015
- Legs: 2
- No. of shows: 35
- Box office: $21 million (33 shows)

Kylie Minogue concert chronology
- Anti Tour (2012); Kiss Me Once Tour (2014–15); Summer 2015 (2015)

The Kiss Me Once Tour was the fourteenth concert tour by Australian singer Kylie Minogue. It was launched in support of her twelfth studio album, Kiss Me Once (2014) and visited Europe, Australia and Middle East. Rumours of plans to tour arose as early as July 2013, after Minogue signed to Roc Nation. The tour was officially announced in March 2014, with the first European dates revealed. Australian dates were announced in June of the same year. The staging, inspired by Bauhaus architecture and club settings, was considered less elaborate and more simple than her previous tours and featured a runway, a B-stage and a series of structural beams. Costumes for the tour were created by fashion designers Jean Paul Gaultier, Julien Macdonald, William Wilde, Marchesa and Dolce & Gabbana. Effects were provided by ER Productions.

The Kiss Me Once Tour was divided into seven acts. The first called Surrealist Girlie Revue began with Minogue emerging from beneath the stage atop of a large pair of lips. Dancer Skorpion joined her on stage during Bauhaus Disco, which featured a laser show. Dollhouse featured a Barbie-themed medley of Minogue's hit songs from the 1980s and early 1990s; during which, the singer recreated the historic bathtub scene from the music video of "I Should Be So Lucky" (1987). Fashsex displayed an "industrial, metallic" feel and featured a cover of "Need You Tonight" (1987) by INXS. Kiss Me Once featured another laser show, as well as performances by Minogue alone on the runway. Showgirl2014 is a retelling of Minogue's Showgirl tour that ran between 2005 and 2007 and saw the singer taking requests from the audience and featured a confetti drop. The encore, Into the Blue, was a performance of the album's lead single.

The tour received generally positive reviews from critics. Critics praised Minogue's charisma and vocals, with some criticising the songs from Kiss Me Once and the stripped-down nature of the show. The Kiss Me Once Tour became the 96th highest-grossing tour of 2014, earning $17 million from 28 shows in Europe. Originally, the tour would have 38 shows; the four shows, scheduled to take place in Germany, were cancelled due to financial difficulties of their promoter, CT Creative Talent. Another show in Austria was also cancelled as a result of the tour's logistics schedule. Footage from the 12 November show in Glasgow was filmed for television broadcast and DVD release, titled Kiss Me Once Live at the SSE Hydro.

== Background ==
In July 2013, Minogue confirmed the plans for an upcoming tour on Twitter, in response to an article in The Mirror's 3am column. Rumours of a performance in Greece also began to be reported in October of the same year. In March 2014, the Kiss Me Once Tour was officially announced, with dates for the European leg revealed. In June, dates for the Australian leg of the tour were announced via The Voice Australia. Minogue held a small concert featuring seven songs at Ushuaïa Ibiza Beach Hotel in Ibiza, Spain in August, prior to the tour commencing. On 8 September, Minogue posted a series photos from rehearsals at her official website, as well as her official social media accounts.

Discussing the mental toll of touring ahead of the Kiss Me Once Tour with the Belfast Telegraph, Minogue stated, "It's a bit odd, but when we're fully on the road, you can't really think about anything else, and the crew becomes family. If someone needs a hand or is having an off day, everyone else just rallies around to pick up the slack and helps out where they can. It's an incredible thing."

Shows in Cologne, Munich, Berlin and Hamburg were scheduled as part of the tour's schedule, however, due to financial difficulties of promoter CT Creative Talent, the shows were cancelled in October 2014. A show in Vienna, Austria was also cancelled as a result of the tour's consequently altered schedule.

== Development ==
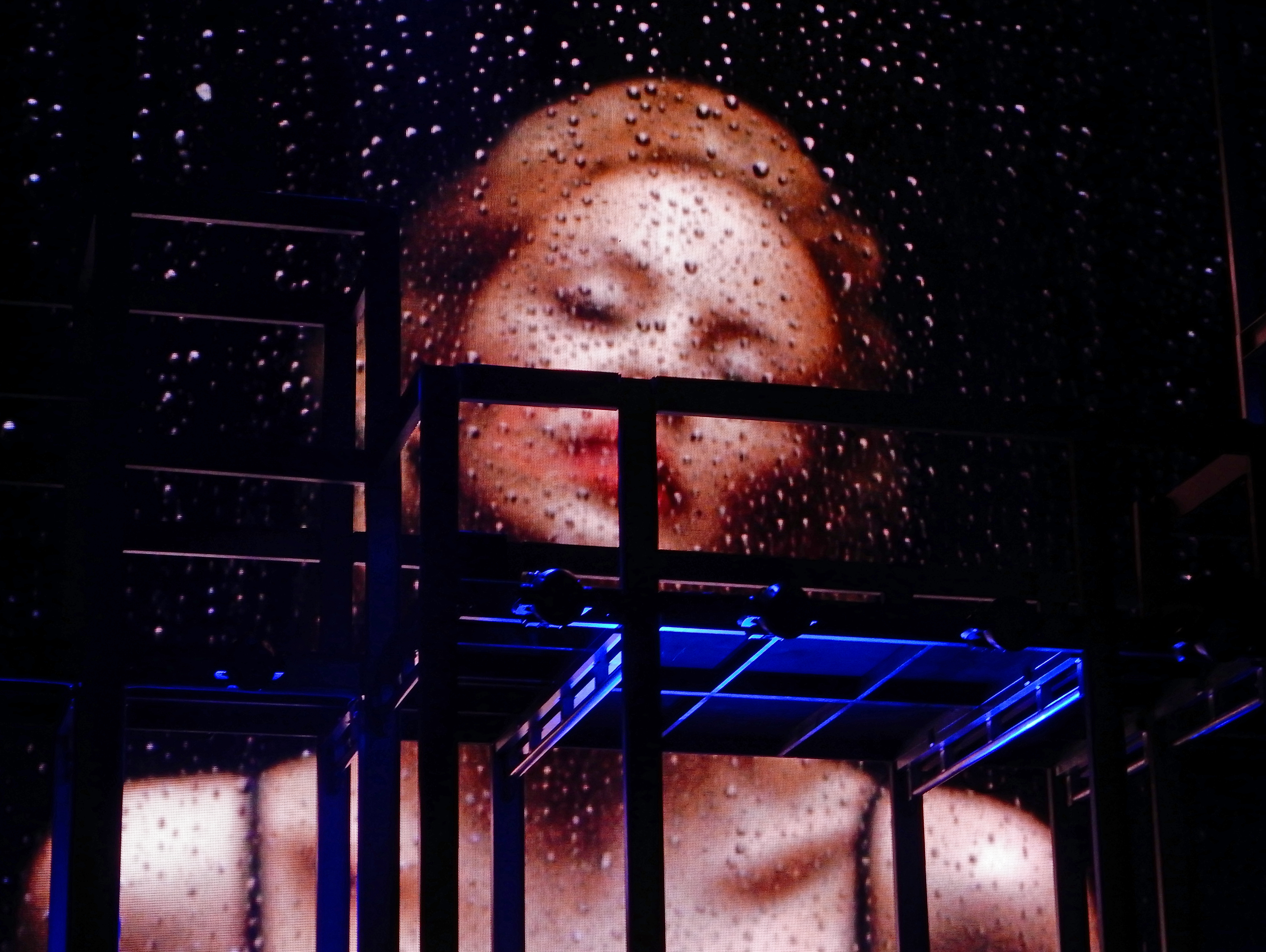
The staging was inspired by Bauhaus architecture and geometry, with a series of structural beams as a backdrop.

First details of the tour were revealed on 13 September 2014, where it was announced that Minogue's long-time work partners William Baker and Steve Anderson would serve as its creative and musical directors, respectively. Ashley Wallen was also announced as choreographer, after previously having served as a dancer on Minogue's Intimate & Live Tour in 1998. In the days leading to the first show, it was announced there would be six songs performed from Kiss Me Once, a further 18 songs from the rest of her career, plus an "unexpected cover"; which was revealed on opening night to be "Need You Tonight" by INXS. Costumes for the tour were designed by Jean Paul Gaultier, Julien Macdonald, William Wilde, Marchesa and Dolce & Gabbana.

The staging of the tour was inspired by "precise geometry" and Bauhaus aesthetics. It consisted of a main stage with a runway and a B-stage, as well as a series of structural beams as a backdrop. The beams' "resemblance to the steel skeleton of a high-rise building" was noted by Adrien Caffery of the Birmingham Mail, and were described as "light-up disco scaffolding" by Joel Meares of The Sydney Morning Herald. The tour's lighting designer, Louisa Smurthwaite, used a large amount of lighting fixtures to create a "clever and classy design" with both "warm, soft looks" and "bold laser drops". ER Productions provided laser effects for the tour; lasers were beamed across the audience using diffraction effects, with a total 67 projection zones.

== Concert synopsis ==
Before the main show, a short film by Baker titled "Sleepwalker" was shown. The film featured three songs by Minogue and Fernando Garibay; "Glow," "Wait" and "Break This Heartbreak". All three songs, along with "Chasing Ghosts" which featured as a video interlude in the show itself, were made available for download via Minogue's official SoundCloud channel, as part of the Sleepwalker EP (2014). The short film was also uploaded to Minogue's account on YouTube.

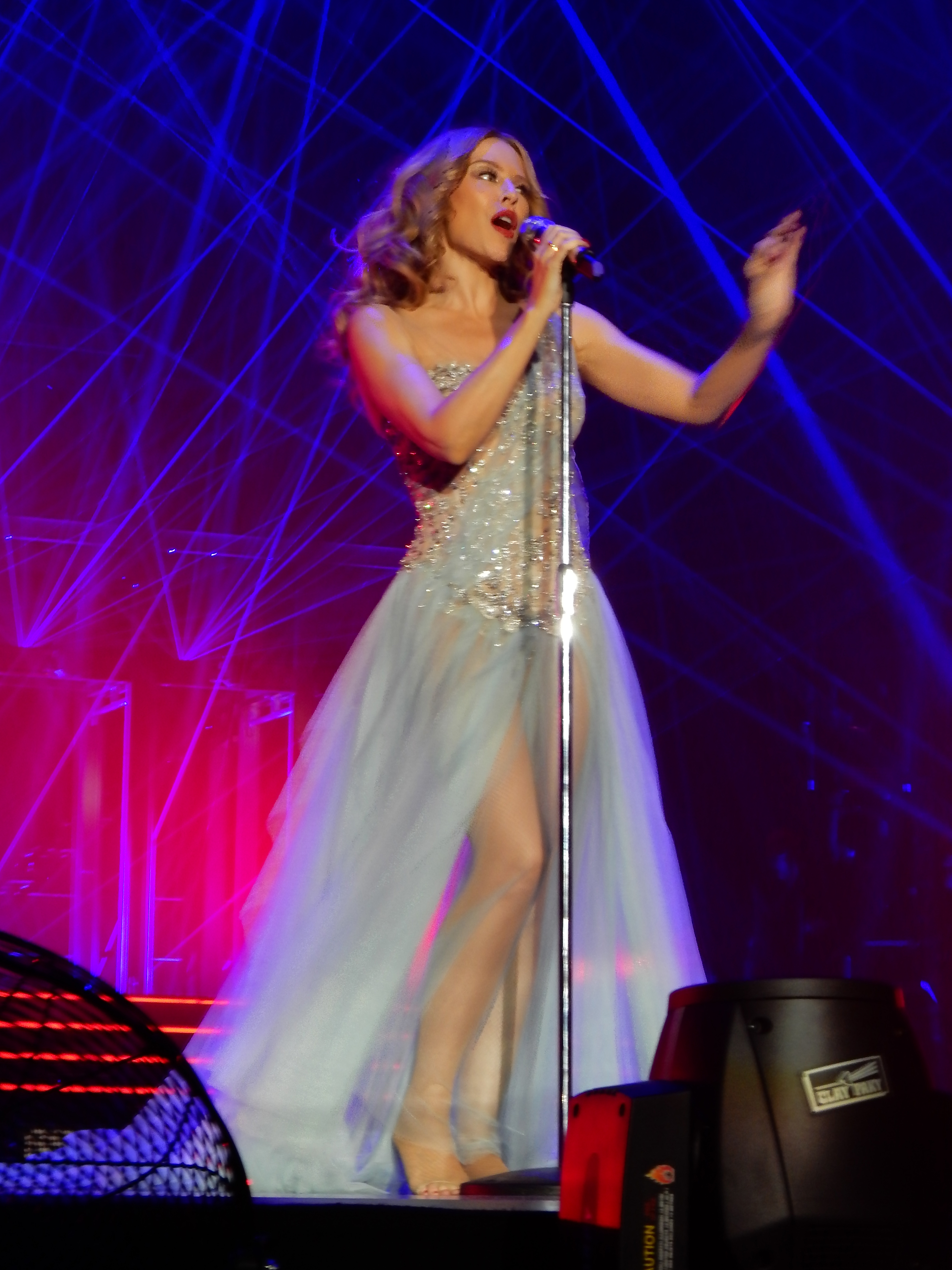
The performance of "Kiss Me Once" featured a laser show (pictured).

The show was divided into seven segments; Surrealist Girlie Revue, Bauhaus Disco, Dollhouse, Fashsex, Kiss Me Once, Showgirl2014 and an encore, Into the Blue. It began with a video sequence with excerpts of "Breathe"; during which, Minogue appeared and kissed the screen, recreating the Kiss Me Once album cover. Dancers then appeared on the stage and Minogue arose atop of an illuminated lip-shaped sofa, performing "Les Sex". The sofa, screen visuals and dancers' costumes for this section were inspired by the artwork of Salvador Dalí. The singer then went on to perform "In My Arms", "Timebomb" and "Sexy Love"; the latter was removed after the first five shows. A performance of "Wow" closed Surrealist Girlie Revue. The second section, Bauhaus Disco, began with "Step Back in Time", which featured a dance breakdown. Performances of "Spinning Around" and "Your Disco Needs You" followed. A laser show took place during "On a Night Like This", before the singer was joined onstage by "Matrix-style breakdancing" Skorpion for a performance of "Slow". A video interlude is then shown featuring "Chasing Ghosts". During the Australian leg of the show, Minogue invited Giorgio Moroder on stage for "Right Here, Right Now", followed by a cover of "I Feel Love" (1977) by Donna Summer.

The third section, Dolls House, consisted of a "Barbie and Ken-themed" medley containing five of Minogue's songs from the 1980s. It began with a "pink cartoon character-filled" interlude featuring "Enjoy Yourself", followed by "Hand on Your Heart", "Never Too Late", "Got to Be Certain". Minogue wore a "Victoria's Secret-inspired" heart-shaped bodice and pink knickers. She then performed "I Should Be So Lucky" in a bathtub filled with white feathers, recreating a scene from the song's music video. Fashsex, the fourth section, began with an interlude of "Skirt". It then continued with Minogue performing a cover of "Need You Tonight" (1987) by INXS wearing a leather jacket, followed by "Sexercize" with an exercise ball dance routine. A segue using excerpts of "Sexercize" and "Nu-di-ty" preceded a "rockier" performance of "Can't Get You Out of My Head". A reworked version of "Kids" then closed the section. The fifth section, Kiss Me Once, began with Minogue performing "Beautiful" alone on the runway, wearing a glittering gown. "Kiss Me Once" was then performed, featuring another laser show and a petal drop. Showgirl2014, the sixth section began with "Get Outta My Way" and an electro remix of "Love at First Sight", with Minogue wearing a "black-and-silver tinsel headdress". "The Loco-Motion" was then performed, followed by "All the Lovers" closing the section; during which, a screen visual featuring same-sex kissing and phrases such as "love" and "unity" appearing. Minogue closed the show with an encore, performing "Into the Blue".

== Critical reception ==
The Kiss Me Once Tour was generally well-reviewed by critics, though the response was more muted compared to Minogue's previous tours. The Mirror gave a positive review of the opening night in Liverpool, saying that Minogue "powered through a greatest hits set". However, they stated the highlight was "super-fan Paul St. German threw his Liverpool Loves Kylie T-shirt onto the stage... in return, Minogue promised to sing a request for St. German. The stan chose "Especially for You". Dave Simpson from The Guardian gave the same show 4 stars, stating "however over the top it gets, the show is minimal enough to focus the attention on her charisma and music", concluding that "[i]t defies belief that she is 46 and has endured a bout of cancer, but the secret of her longevity is obvious: everyone, including the artist, exits grinning from ear to ear".

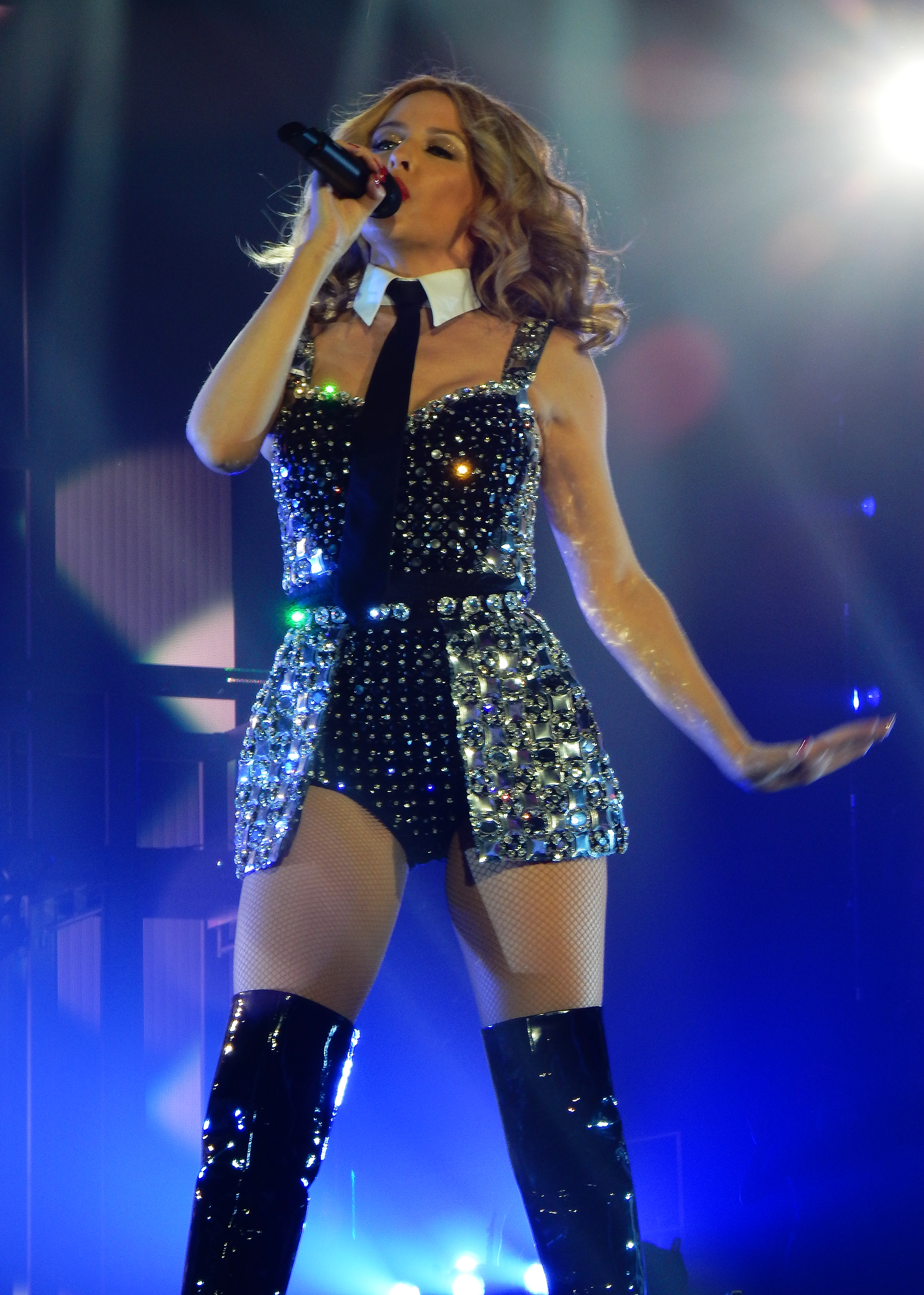
Minogue performing during the Bauhaus Disco section of the show in Sheffield

Daisy Wyatt from The Independent gave the first London date 4 stars, stating that "the pint-sized pop star exudes energy and charisma". More critically, she commented that Minogue "is too keen to prove to a younger audience that she still has it". Wyatt compared the singer to fellow pop stars, saying that "she saunters around in a leather outfit Rihanna would not think twice about wearing" and her "dancers twerk while a Beyoncé-inspired black and white video of Kylie flashes in the background". She concluded that "her shining stage presence sees her through and is likely to keep her going for another decade". Lewis Corner from Digital Spy gave the same show 3.5 stars, stating that "Minogue shows no sign of stopping yet". He went on to say that "the hits have aged [...] well. "On a Night Like This" soared with its impressive laser show." Corner criticised the minimalist staging, commenting that "at certain points it makes the show feel restrained and deflated"; however, he concluded that "her glamour, charisma and strong vocal performance made sure it didn't fall completely flat." Alice Vincent from The Telegraph gave the concert a mixed review, saying that she was "both entertained and alarmed by Kylie's robotically polished performance". She viewed the tour as "a textbook "Good Time": lasers; a series of outfits that, like Russian dolls, get increasingly smaller; gyrating dancers and, at the centre of it all, tiny Kylie, delivering hit after hit". Vincent criticised the Kiss Me Once songs, stating that it was "unsettling to see Minogue promote her more recent songs trussed up in an outfit better suited to Taylor Swift ... she held less allure than an Ann Summers catalogue as she sang "Les Sex" and "Sexy Love" over thudding club beats". Nevertheless, she concluded by saying that "with a set-list as good as hers, none of this seemed to matter much".

For the opening date of her Australian leg in Perth, Chloe Papas from The Guardian gave the show three stars, stating that Minogue "kicks off [her] homecoming Kiss Me Once tour in good voice – and sequins – but in a pop world dominated by political and personal narratives, Kylie falls short". She later commented that the show is "slick and practiced" and "bar a few wavers here and there, Minogue can hold her own as a musician, hitting the high notes and showing off her a cappella skills while bantering with the fans." She concluded that "her musical offerings struggle to bring in new audiences" and that her "brand of superficial pop falls short", before summing up the review by saying that "she still puts on an incredible show". Simon Collins from The West Australian reviewed the same show, giving it four stars and stating that "Minogue remains Australia's pop queen." He was complimentary about how the tour "eschewed the spectacular but overwhelming waterworks of 2011's Aphrodite World Tour, homing in on the star's hits." Joel Meares from The Sydney Morning Herald gave the Sydney show four stars, noting that whilst the arena "was not quite full for this single Sydney date [...] if Kylie's spirits were dampened, however, she wasn't showing it". He also noted that "the sets weren't as elaborate as they were during say, her 2008 KylieX tour (three shows at Allphones), but a kind of light-up disco scaffolding provided a fun backdrop".

== Commercial performance ==
On Pollstar 's "2014 Year-end Top 100 Worldwide Tours" list, the Kiss Me Once Tour ranked at number 96, with a gross of $17 million and 186,813 tickets sold for 28 shows in Europe. According to Billboard Boxscore, the Australian leg grossed an estimated $4 million in total.

== Set list ==
This set list represents the 24 September 2014 show in Liverpool, England. It does not represent all dates.

Act 1: First Kiss

1. "Breathe" (Video Intro)
2. "Les Sex"
3. "In My Arms"
4. "Timebomb"
5. "Sexy Love"
6. "Wow"

Act 2: Secret Kiss

7. "Step Back in Time" (with samples from "Closer")
8. "Spinning Around"
9. "Your Disco Needs You" (Almighty Mix)
10. "On a Night Like This"
11. "Slow" (with samples from the "Chemical Brothers Mix")

Act 3: Dizzy Kiss

12. "Chasing Ghosts" (Video Interlude)
13. "Enjoy Yourself" / "Hand on Your Heart" / "Never Too Late" / "Got to Be Certain" / "I Should Be So Lucky"

Act 4: Lick Kiss

14. "Skirt" (Dance/Video Interlude)
15. "Need You Tonight" (INXS cover)
16. "Sexercize"
17. "Can't Get You Out of My Head" (with "Nu-Di-Ty" intro)
18. "Kids"

Act 5: Aussie Kiss

19. "Beautiful"
20. "Kiss Me Once"
21. "Get Outta My Way"
22. "Love at First Sight"
23. "All the Lovers"

Encore

24. "Into the Blue"

=== Notes ===
- "Sexy Love" was removed from the set list after the iTunes Festival show.
- During the Australian leg of the tour, Giorgio Moroder joined Minogue on stage for a performance of "Right Here, Right Now".
- "The Loco-Motion" was performed as the final song of show during the iTunes Festival, and was added to the set list permanently, between "Love at First Sight" and "All the Lovers" thereafter.
- During the iTunes Festival and Monte Carlo shows a shortened version of the setlist was presented with 3 segments and 17 songs."Timebomb", the 80s medley, "Need You Tonight" and "Kids" were dropped and the Lick Kiss and Aussie Kiss and the Encore were condensed into just one.
- "Tears on My Pillow" was performed after "Can't Get You Out of My Head" at all Australian shows.
- "Sleepwalker" Short film was shown before select shows and contains elements of the new songs "Glow", "Wait" and "Break This Heartbreak")

== Tour dates ==
List of 2014 concerts
Date (2014)	City	Country	Venue	Attendance	Revenue
24 September	Liverpool	England	Echo Arena	7,932 / 9,651	$675,362
26 September	Manchester	England	Phones 4u Arena	13,285 / 14,585	$1,124,680
27 September (Note: The 27 September 2014 concert in London, England at The Roundhouse is a part of iTunes Festival.)	London	England	The Roundhouse	—N/a	
29 September	London	England	The O_{2} Arena	29,015 / 39,193	$2,745,410
30 September	London	England	The O_{2} Arena	29,015 / 39,193	$2,745,410
1 October	London	England	The O_{2} Arena	29,015 / 39,193	$2,745,410
3 October	Cardiff	Wales	Motorpoint Arena	—N/a	—N/a
4 October	Nottingham	England	Capital FM Arena	—N/a	—N/a
5 October	Nottingham	England	Capital FM Arena	—N/a	—N/a
7 October	Birmingham	England	Barclaycard Arena	9,291 / 12,801	$866,765
11 October	Monte Carlo	Monaco	Monte-Carlo Sporting	—N/a	—N/a
13 October	Madrid	Spain	Barclaycard Center	—N/a	—N/a
14 October	Barcelona	Spain	Palau Sant Jordi	—N/a	—N/a
15 October	Montpellier	France	Park&Suites Arena	—N/a	—N/a
18 October	Budapest	Hungary	Budapest Sports Arena	—N/a	—N/a
19 October	Bratislava	Slovakia	Slovnaft Arena	—N/a	—N/a
21 October	Prague	Czech Republic	O_{2} Arena	—N/a	—N/a
30 October	Łódź	Poland	Atlas Arena	—N/a	—N/a
31 October	Kaunas	Lithuania	Žalgiris Arena	—N/a	—N/a
2 November	Riga	Latvia	Arena Riga	—N/a	—N/a
5 November	Lille	France	Zénith de Lille	—N/a	—N/a
6 November	Brussels	Belgium	Palais 12	—N/a	—N/a
8 November	Dublin	Ireland	3Arena	8,549 / 9,000	$684,934
9 November	Belfast	Northern Ireland	SSE Arena	6,440 / 7,000	$551,126
11 November	Newcastle	England	Metro Radio Arena	6,907 / 10,173	$554,008
12 November	Glasgow	Scotland	SSE Hydro	11,508 / 11,609	$908,423
13 November	Sheffield	England	Sheffield Arena	—N/a	—N/a
15 November	Paris	France	Accor Arena	—N/a	—N/a
17 November	Zürich	Switzerland	Hallenstadion	5,178 / 7,300	$390,496

List of 2015 concerts
Date (2015)	City	Country	Venue	Attendance	Revenue
14 March	Perth	Australia	Perth Arena	7,989 / 8,187	$820,342
17 March	Adelaide	Australia	Entertainment Centre	5,696 / 8,064	$516,989
18 March	Melbourne	Australia	Rod Laver Arena	10,369 / 11,224	$836,512
20 March	Sydney	Australia	Qantas Union Credit Arena	9,129 / 9,735	$1,035,330
21 March	Brisbane	Australia	Entertainment Centre	6,865 / 7,227	$754,893
28 March (Note: The 28 March 2015 concert in Dubai, United Arab Emirates at Meydan Racecourse is a part of Dubai World Cup.)	Dubai	UAE	Meydan Racecourse	—N/a	—N/a

=== Cancelled shows ===
List of cancelled concerts
Date (2014)	City	Country	Venue	Reason	Ref.
22 October	Cologne	Germany	Lanxess Arena	Financial difficulties of the German promoter for the show	
23 October	Vienna	Austria	Wiener Stadthalle	Scheduling conflicts	
25 October	Munich	Germany	Olympiahalle	Financial difficulties of the German promoter for the show	
27 October	Berlin	Germany	O_{2} World	Financial difficulties of the German promoter for the show	
28 October	Hamburg	Germany	O_{2} World Hamburg	Financial difficulties of the German promoter for the show	

== Broadcasts and recordings ==
Minogue's performance at the 2014 iTunes Festival was recorded and streamed live and made available on Minogue's iTunes Store for a limited time. Six songs from the performance were made available for digital download on iTunes, as part of the deluxe edition of Kiss Me Once. The 12 November performance at the SSE Hydro in Glasgow was professionally filmed, and was broadcast on British TV channel ITV. The concert was recorded in 4k and was used to demonstrate 4k TVs and has been shown on 4k TV channels, but has never had a 4k release.

== Personnel ==
- William Baker – creative director
- Kylie Minogue – creative director
- Steve Anderson – musical director
- Ashley Wallen – choreographer
- Rob Sinclair – lighting designer

Band

- Pete Watson – piano, keyboards
- Tom Meadows – drums
- Dishan Abrahams – bass
- Luke Fitton – guitar
- Roxy Rizzo – backing vocals
- Lucy Jules – backing vocals

Designers

- Dolce & Gabbana
- Jean Paul Gaultier
- Marchesa
- Julien Macdonald
- William Wilde
