= Beautiful (Enrique Iglesias and Kylie Minogue song) =

2014 promotional single by Enrique Iglesias and Kylie Minogue

Promotional single by Enrique Iglesias and Kylie Minogue

from the album Sex and Love and Kiss Me Once
- Released: 14 March 2014
- Studio: Metrophonic Studios (London, England); South Point Productions (Miami, FL)
- Genre: Pop
- Length: 3:25
- Label: Republic
- Songwriters: Enrique Iglesias; Mark Taylor; Alex Smith; Samuel Preston
- Producers: Mark Taylor; Alex Smith

Audio video
- "Beautiful" on YouTube

"Beautiful" is a song by Spanish singer Enrique Iglesias from his tenth studio album, Sex and Love. It is a duet with Australian singer Kylie Minogue and was also included on her album Kiss Me Once. "Beautiful" was written by Iglesias, Mark Taylor, Alex Smith, and Samuel Preston, and it was produced by Taylor and Smith. The song was released as a promotional single in Australia and New Zealand on 14 March 2014. An official audio video was later uploaded to Kylie Minogue’s YouTube channel on 31 July 2014 to promote the track. As part of her Kiss Me Once album campaign, Minogue also performed the song solo at several promotional events, including the iTunes Festival, the iHeartRadio secret concert, the 2014 Commonwealth Games, and a special appearance at London’s G‑A‑Y nightclub, and she later included it in the setlist of her Kiss Me Once Tour.

== Format and track listing ==
- Australian and New Zealand digital download
1. "Beautiful" – 3:25

== Charts ==
Chart (2014)	Peak position
Australia (ARIA)	47

== Release history ==
Country	Date	Format	Label
Australia	14 March 2014	Digital download	Republic
New Zealand	14 March 2014	Digital download	Republic
