= Fernando Garibay =

American musician and writer (born 1982)

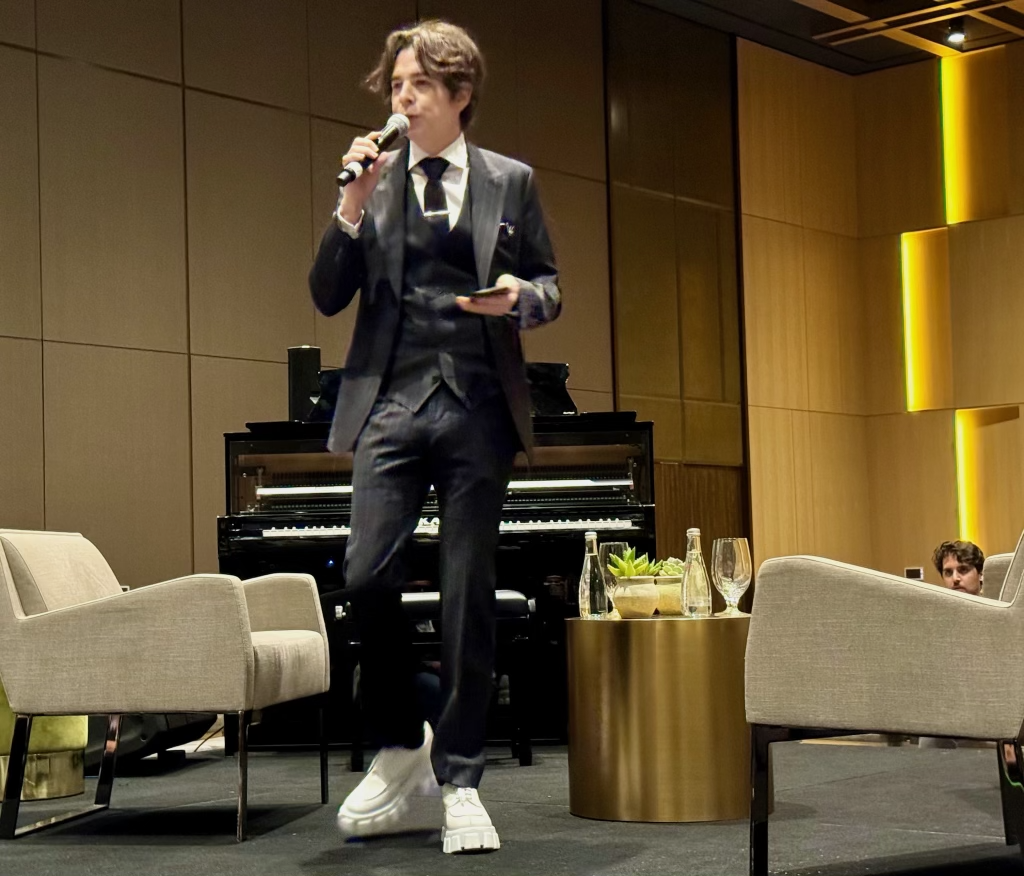
- Garibay in 2024

Background information
- Born: December 27, 1982 (age 43)
- Genres: Pop
- Occupations: Record producer; songwriter; disc jockey; academic; author
- Years active: 1998–present
- Labels: Interscope; Paradise
- Formerly of: Kylie and Garibay
- Website: garibayinstitute.com

Fernando Garibay (born December 27, 1982) is an American record producer, songwriter, and author. He was one half of the short-lived pop duo, Kylie and Garibay, which he formed with Australian singer Kylie Minogue in 2014.

== Career ==
Garibay was the musical director of Lady Gaga's Born This Way Ball and the producer of her Born This Way album. He has produced and written for artists including Lady Gaga, U2, Sia, Whitney Houston, Britney Spears, Shakira, Bruno Mars, Kylie Minogue, Enrique Iglesias, the Pussycat Dolls, Snoop Dogg, Paris Hilton, Poppy (singer), Ellie Goulding, JJ Lin, Giorgio Moroder, Shaggy, Sting, Wiz Khalifa, and Lizzo. Garibay formed the pop duo collaboration Kylie and Garibay, with Australian singer Kylie Minogue in 2014.

He has been nominated for multiple Grammy Awards, 6 BMI Songwriter Awards and has helped write and produce a number of global chart-topping hit records, including five US number ones and several top 10 dance records on Billboard.

Garibay was the producer on the Grammy Award-winning recording The Fame Monster by Lady Gaga, which won the "Best Pop Vocal Album" award at the 53rd Annual Grammy Awards in 2010.

He has written several position papers and opinion pieces for publications like The Hill and The Messenger.
