= Bat for Lashes discography =

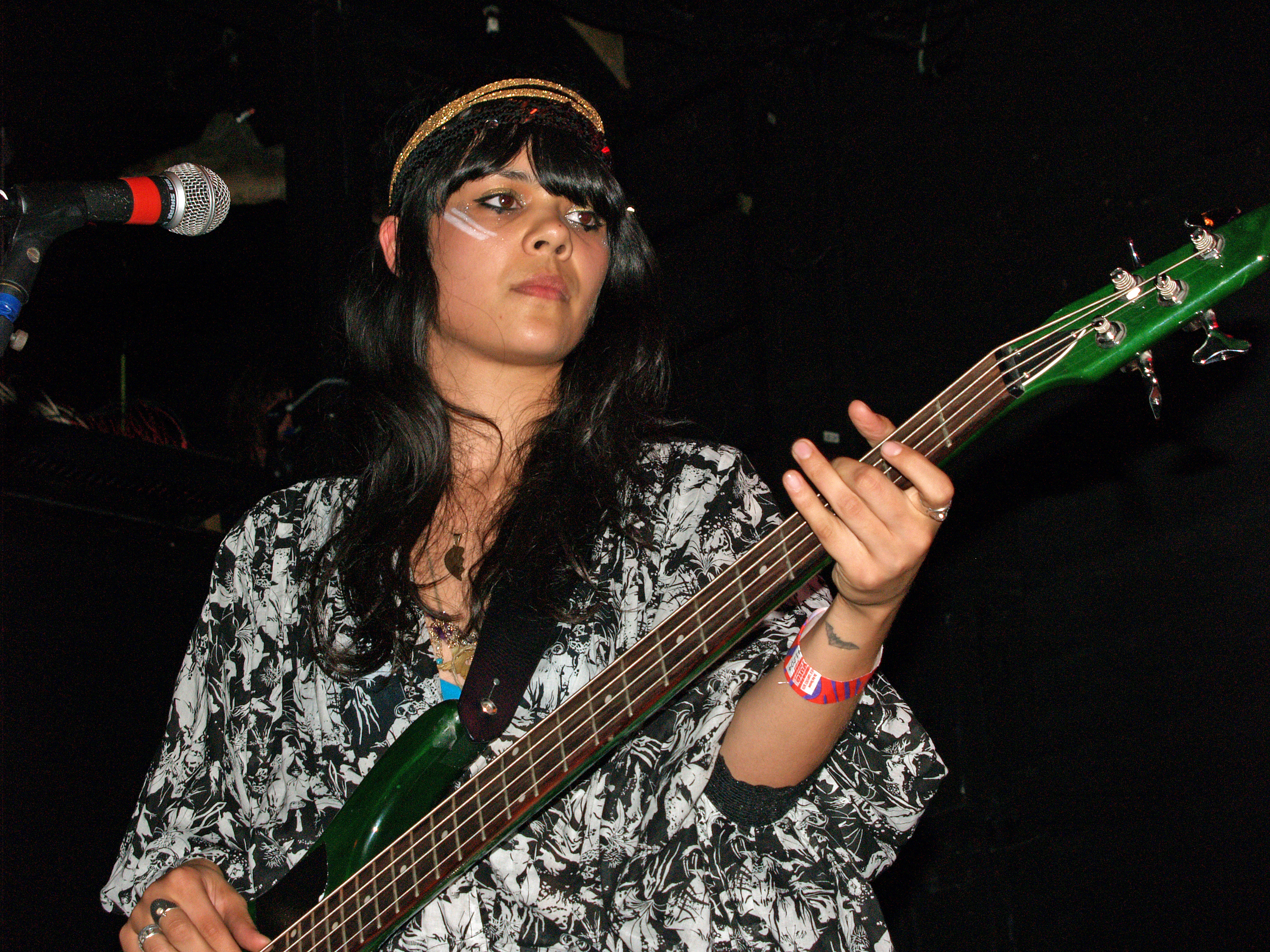
- Bat for Lashes performing in 2007
- Studio albums: 6
- Extended plays: 3
- Singles: 20
- Music videos: 12
- Other appearances: 8

Bat for Lashes (Natasha Khan), an English indie pop singer, has released six studio albums, three extended plays, twenty singles and twelve music videos.

Bat for Lashes released her debut studio album, Fur and Gold in September 2006. The album reached number forty-eight in the United Kingdom and was certified silver by the British Phonographic Industry (BPI). Four singles, "The Wizard", "Trophy", "Prescilla" and "What's a Girl to Do?", were released from the album.

Two Suns, her second studio album, followed in June 2009. It peaked at number five in the UK and was certified gold by the BPI. Three singles were released from the album: "Daniel", "Pearl's Dream" and "Sleep Alone", with "Daniel" charting at number thirty-six in the UK and number forty-seven in the Flanders region of Belgium. Bat for Lashes worked extensively with producers Dan Carey and David Kosten in recording her third studio album The Haunted Man. Released in October 2012, it peaked at number six in the UK. Three singles were released from the album: "Laura", "All Your Gold" and "A Wall".

== Studio albums ==
List of studio albums, with selected chart positions and certifications
| Title | Album details | Peak chart positions | | | | | | | | | | Certifications |
| Title | Album details | UK | AUS | BEL (FL) | BEL (WA) | FIN | FRA | IRE | NZ | SWI | US | Certifications |
|---|---|---|---|---|---|---|---|---|---|---|---|---|
| Fur and Gold | Released: 11 September 2006 (UK); Label: Parlophone; Formats: CD, LP, digital download, streaming | 48 | — | — | — | — | 130 | — | — | — | — | BPI: Gold |
| Two Suns | Released: 6 April 2009 (UK); Label: Parlophone; Formats: CD, LP, digital download, streaming | 5 | 95 | 26 | 74 | 39 | 56 | 17 | — | 94 | 141 | BPI: Gold |
| The Haunted Man | Released: 15 October 2012 (UK); Label: Parlophone; Formats: CD, LP, digital download, streaming | 6 | 21 | 12 | 21 | 18 | 31 | 7 | 32 | 29 | 64 | BPI: Silver |
| The Bride | Released: 1 July 2016 (UK); Label: Parlophone; Formats: CD, LP, digital download, streaming | 9 | 40 | 38 | 42 | — | 101 | 18 | 32 | 28 | — (Note: The Bride did not enter the Billboard 200, but peaked at number 95 on the US Top Album Sales chart.) | |
| Lost Girls | Released: 6 September 2019; Label: Bat for Lashes, AWAL; Formats: CD, LP, digital download, streaming, cassette | 13 | — (Note: Lost Girls did not enter the ARIA Albums Chart, but peaked at number 39 on the ARIA Digital Album Chart.) | 47 | 130 | — | — | — | — | — | — (Note: Lost Girls did not enter the Billboard 200, but peaked at number 48 on the US Top Album Sales chart.) | |
| The Dream of Delphi | Released: 31 May 2024; Label: Bat for Lashes, AWAL; Formats: CD, Digital download, streaming | 73 | — | 153 | — | — | — | — | — | — | — | |
"—" denotes release that did not chart or was not released in that territory.

== Extended plays ==
List of extended plays
| Title | Details |
|---|---|
| Live Session | Released: 12 February 2008 (UK); Label: Echo; Format: Digital download |
| iTunes Festival: London 2009 | Released: 27 July 2009 (UK); Label: Echo; Format: Digital download |
| iTunes Festival: London 2012 | Released: 29 October 2012 (UK); Label: Echo; Format: Digital download |

== Singles ==
List of singles, with selected chart positions, showing year released and album name
| Title | Year | Peak chart positions | | | | | | | | | Album |
| Title | Year | UK | UK Indie | AUS | BEL (FL) | BEL (WA) | CZ Rock | MEX | POL | SCO | Album |
|---|---|---|---|---|---|---|---|---|---|---|---|
| "The Wizard" | 2006 | — | — | — | — | — | — | — | — | — | Fur and Gold |
| "Trophy" | 2006 | — | 25 | — | — | — | — | — | — | — | Fur and Gold |
| "Prescilla" | 2007 | — | 29 | — | — | — | — | — | — | — | Fur and Gold |
| "What's a Girl to Do?" | 2007 | 141 | 9 | — | — | — | — | — | — | 59 | Fur and Gold |
| "Daniel" | 2009 | 36 | — | — | 47 | 72 | — | 21 | 32 | 15 | Two Suns |
| "Pearl's Dream" | 2009 | 173 | — | — | — | — | — | 24 | — | 26 | Two Suns |
| "Sleep Alone" / "Moon And Moon" | 2009 | — | — | — | — | — | — | — | — | — | Two Suns |
| "Laura" | 2012 | 144 | — | 90 | 126 | — | — | — | 50 | — | The Haunted Man |
| "All Your Gold" | 2012 | — (Note: "All Your Gold" did not enter the UK Singles Chart, but peaked at number five on the UK Physical Singles Chart.) | — | — | — | — | — | 41 | — | — | The Haunted Man |
| "A Wall" | 2012 | — | — | — | — | — | — | — | — | — | The Haunted Man |
| "In God's House" | 2016 | — | — | — | — | — | — | — | — | — | The Bride |
| "Sunday Love" | 2016 | — | — | — | — (Note: "Sunday Love" did not enter the Flanders Ultratop 50, but charted as an extra tip on the Flanders Ultratip chart.) | — (Note: "Sunday Love" did not enter the Wallonie Ultratop 50, but charted as an extra tip on the Wallonie Ultratip chart.) | 15 | — | — | — | The Bride |
| "Joe's Dream" | 2016 | — | — | — | — | — | — | — | — | — | The Bride |
| "If I Knew" | 2016 | — (Note: "If I Knew" did not enter the UK Singles Chart, but peaked at number 15 on the UK Physical Singles Chart.) | — | — | — | — | — | — | — | — | The Bride |
| "Kids in the Dark" | 2019 | — | — | — | — (Note: "Kids in the Dark" did not enter the Flanders Ultratop 50, but charted as an extra tip on the Flanders Ultratip chart.) | — | — | — | — | — | Lost Girls |
| "We've Only Just Begun" | 2020 | — (Note: "We've Only Just Begun" did not enter the UK Singles Chart, but peaked at number 73 on the UK Singles Downloads Chart.) | — | — | — | — | — | — | — | — | non-album single |
| "Near" (with The Album Leaf) | 2023 | — | — | — | — | — | — | — | — | — | Future Falling |
| "The Dream of Delphi" | 2024 | — | — | — | — | — | — | — | — | — | The Dream of Delphi |
| "Letter to My Daughter" | 2024 | — | — | — | — | — | — | — | — | — | The Dream of Delphi |
| "Home" | 2024 | — | — | — | — | — | — | — | — | — | The Dream of Delphi |
"—" denotes release that did not chart or was not released in that territory.

=== Promotional singles ===
List of promotional singles, with selected chart positions, showing year released and album name
| Title | Year | Peak chart positions | Album |
| Title | Year | UK Sales | Album |
|---|---|---|---|
| "Howl!" / "Wild Is the Wind" | 2010 | 15 | Non-album single |
| "Let's Get Lost" (with Beck) | 2011 | 25 | The Twilight Saga: Eclipse Soundtrack |
| "Strangelove" | 2012 | 30 | Non-album single |
| "Lilies" | 2013 | — | The Haunted Man |
| "I Do" | 2016 | — | The Bride |
"—" denotes release that did not chart or was not released in that territory.

== Other appearances ==
List of non-single appearances, showing year released and album name
| Title | Year | Album |
|---|---|---|
| "I'm on Fire" (Live) | 2007 | The Saturday Sessions: The Dermot O'Leary Show |
| "Sweet Dreams (Are Made of This)" (Live) | 2008 | Radio 1's Live Lounge – Volume 3 |
| "A Forest" | 2008 | Perfect as Cats: A Tribute to The Cure |
| "Let's Get Lost" (with Beck) | 2010 | The Twilight Saga: Eclipse Soundtrack |
| "The Bride" (with TOY) | 2013 | - |
| "Garden's Heart" (with Jon Hopkins) | 2013 | How I Live Now |
| "The Selfish Giant" (with Damon Albarn) | 2014 | Everyday Robots |
| "Plan the Escape" | 2014 | The Hunger Games: Mockingjay, Part 1 – Original Motion Picture Soundtrack |

== Music videos ==
List of music videos, showing year released and director
| Title | Year | Director(s) |
|---|---|---|
| "Prescilla" | 2007 | Andy Bruntel |
| "What's a Girl to Do?" | 2007 | Dougal Wilson |
| "Daniel" | 2009 | Johan Renck |
| "Pearl's Dream" | 2009 | Nima Nourizadeh |
| "Sleep Alone" | 2009 | Rupert Noble |
| "Laura" | 2012 | Noel Paul |
| "All Your Gold" | 2012 | Noel Paul |
| "A Wall" | 2012 | Noel Paul |
| "Lilies" | 2013 | Peter Sluszka |
| "In God's House" | 2016 | Natasha Khan and John De Menil |
| "Sunday Love" | 2016 | Natasha Khan and John De Menil |
| "Joe's Dream" | 2016 | Natasha Khan and John De Menil |
