= The Bride (album) =

Studio album by Bat for Lashes
- Released: 1 July 2016
- Recorded: 2015
- Studio: Ohayo Mountain, New York
- Genre: Baroque pop; rock
- Length: 47:32
- Label: Parlophone
- Producer: Natasha Khan

Bat for Lashes chronology
The Haunted Man (2012)	The Bride (2016)	Lost Girls (2019)

Singles from The Bride
- 1. "In God's House" Released: 11 March 2016; 2. "Sunday Love" Released: 27 May 2016; 3. "Joe's Dream" Released: 7 June 2016; 4. "If I Knew"/"In Your Bed" Released: 16 December 2016

The Bride is the fourth studio album by English singer-songwriter Natasha Khan, professionally known as Bat for Lashes. It was released on 1 July 2016 by Parlophone. The album was produced by Khan, with co-production from Ben Christophers, Simone Felice, David Baron, Dan Carey, Jacknife Lee and Matt "Aqualung" Hales. The Bride was preceded by the digital promotional single "I Do", followed by the singles "In God's House", "Sunday Love", "Joe's Dream", and the double A-side release of "If I Knew" and "In Your Bed".

== Background ==
While promoting her side project Sexwitch, which she formed with Dan Carey and the indie rock band Toy, Khan stated that she was working on a new album. She stated that it was linked to a short film she had made about a woman going through a tragedy on her wedding day and that the album would be hopefully released in spring of 2016. Recording took six months at a rented house in Ohayo Mountain in late 2015. In February 2016, Khan started posting preview photos from her collaboration with photographer Neil Krug. On 19 February 2016, she released a promotional single titled "I Do" with cryptic artwork stating "Save the Date, 1st July 2016". The lead single from the album, "In God's House", debuted on Annie Mac's BBC Radio 1 show on 10 March, and was released digitally the following day.

== Concept, release and artwork ==
According to The Bride's press release, the work is a concept album that follows the story of a woman, whose fiancé dies in a car crash on the way to their wedding. The album follows her as she decides to go on the honeymoon alone and her emotions as she deals with the tragedy. Khan commented that "the trauma and the grief from the death of Joe, the groom, ... [is] ... more of a metaphor and it allows me to explore the concept of love in general, which requires a death of sorts."

The album was created with past collaborators Simone Felice, Dan Carey, Head and Ben Christophers. The release of the album was preceded by the singles "In God's House" and "Sunday Love", both with music videos directed by Khan herself and John DeMenil. To promote the album, Bat for Lashes embarked on a small tour which consisted of performing in a number of churches to match the wedding theme. Fans and attendees were asked to wear formal attire to the shows. The album's artwork was made in collaboration with photographer Neil Krug and was shot over the course of a year. The CD and vinyl feature a booklet and prints of the photos from this collaboration.

== Critical reception ==
Professional ratings
Aggregate scores
Source	Rating
Metacritic	78/100
Review scores
Source	Rating
AllMusic	3.5/5 stars
The A.V. Club	B+
The Daily Telegraph	4/5 stars
DIY	4/5 stars
The Guardian	4/5 stars
NME	4/5
Pitchfork	7.6/10
Q	4/5 stars
Rolling Stone	3.5/5 stars
Slant Magazine	3.5/5 stars

The Bride received generally positive reviews from music critics. At Metacritic, which assigns a normalised rating out of 100 to reviews from mainstream publications, the album received an average score of 78, based on 30 reviews. Neil McCormick of The Daily Telegraph hailed The Bride as "a beautiful, beguiling, disturbing and rewarding album of love, loss, grief and recovery from one of the most intriguing singer-songwriters currently active in British music, of either gender." Rachel Aroesti of The Guardian described the album as "a collection of darkly intriguing dirges, a battle for dominance between Khan's intimate, exquisitely beautiful vocal and subtly unnerving sonic dissonance at its heart." Larry Bartleet of NME viewed the album as Khan's "most ambitious yet" and remarked that she "refuses to yield crossover hits like 2009's 'Daniel' [...] opting instead for a slow style of storytelling that rewards the patient listener." George Garner of Q dubbed it Khan's "boldest album yet" and wrote, "In the moving figure of The Bride, Khan has delivered her defining statement as an artist." Nina Keen of DIY noted that "[t]here's a resistance [to] clichés on this record, and Khan gives a freshness and a sincerity to her otherwise ethereal music", calling the album "a beautiful, complex and often harrowing listening experience."

Pitchfork's Cameron Cook stated the album "may be Bat for Lashes' most ambitious project yet" and commented, "Its few shortcomings aside, The Bride is further proof that Khan, unlike almost all of her contemporaries, understands how to wade into mystical realms and emerge with big, beguiling pop." Kory Grow of Rolling Stone felt that although "the album lags when the story gets too heavy", "there are many songs on The Bride that transcend its thematic conceit and stand on their own as unique puzzle pieces in Kahn's steadfastly mystifying persona." Heather Phares of AllMusic stated that the album "begins vividly", but was unimpressed with its "slower" second half, concluding that "The Bride is beautifully crafted, but not always thrilling." Katie Rife of The A.V. Club expressed that following "Never Forgive the Angels", "the power of The Bride's narrative begins to fade in a series of piano-focused ballads that, while uniformly beautiful [...] aren't distinctive enough songwriting-wise to stand out from one another." Slant Magazine's Sal Cinquemani wrote, "That The Bride works best as a song cycle rather than a collection of pop hooks is a testament to its cohesion and intrinsic intertexuality, but what's missing here is Khan's knack for grafting avant-art-rock concepts onto mainstream forms."

=== Accolades ===
Publication	Accolade	Year	Rank
Rough Trade	Albums of the Year	2016	59

== Commercial performance ==
The Bride debuted at number nine on the UK Albums Chart with 8,242 copies sold in its first week, becoming Khan's third consecutive top-10 album.

== Track listing ==
All tracks are written by Natasha Khan, except where noted.

No.	Title	Writer(s)	Length
1.	"I Do"		2:17
2.	"Joe's Dream"		5:25
3.	"In God's House"		3:32
4.	"Honeymooning Alone"		3:30
5.	"Sunday Love"	Khan; Dan Carey	4:13
6.	"Never Forgive the Angels"		4:25
7.	"Close Encounters"		4:10
8.	"Widow's Peak"	Khan; Simone Felice	3:47
9.	"Land's End"		3:10
10.	"If I Knew"		4:17
11.	"I Will Love Again"	Khan; Felice; Lou Rogai	5:14
12.	"In Your Bed"		3:32

Digital edition bonus track
No.	Title	Length
13.	"Clouds"	5:23

== Personnel ==
Credits adapted from the liner notes of The Bride.

=== Musicians ===
- Natasha Khan – Omnichord (tracks 1, 3, 5); vocals (all tracks); drum programming (tracks 2, 3); Rhodes, electric guitar, tambourine (track 2); keys, mandolin, pocket piano (track 3); synths (tracks 3, 5, 7, 12); drums (tracks 4, 6); harp (track 4); Farfisa organ (track 5); guitar (tracks 6, 9–11); string arrangements (track 7); celesta, vibraphone (track 8); piano, bass synth (track 10); drum machine (track 11); claps (track 12)
- Ben Christophers – bowed guitar (track 1); bass (tracks 1, 4, 6); vocals, piano (track 6)
- David Baron – bass (track 1); synths (tracks 1–3, 7); Rhodes (track 2); programming (tracks 2, 3, 7); string arrangements (track 7)
- Jacknife Lee – synths, programming, sampler (track 2)
- Alex Reeves – timpani (tracks 2, 4, 8); drums, percussion (track 8)
- Simone Felice – drums (track 3)
- Rachael Yamagata – backing vocals (tracks 4, 7)
- Sandy Bell – backing vocals (tracks 4, 7)
- Lou Rogai – guitars (tracks 4, 11, 12); bass (tracks 11, 12); backing vocals (track 11)
- Dan Carey – programming, synths (track 5)
- Leo Taylor – drums (track 5)
- Dawn Landes – guitar, backing vocals (track 8)
- Kevin Salem – guitar (track 8)
- Davide Rossi – strings (tracks 9, 12); string arrangements (track 9)
- Matt Hales – drum programming, synths (track 12)

=== Technical ===
- Natasha Khan – production (all tracks)
- Simone Felice – co-production (all tracks); recording (tracks 1–4, 6–8, 10–12)
- David Baron – co-production, mixing (all tracks); recording (track 3); sound effects (track 8)
- Head – co-production, mixing (all tracks); recording (tracks 1, 4, 6, 7)
- Ben Christophers – co-production (all tracks); recording (tracks 1, 9); sound effects (track 4)
- Jacknife Lee – co-production, recording (track 2)
- Dan Carey – co-production, recording (track 5)
- Matt Hales – co-production, recording (track 12)
- Pete Hanlon – engineering (all tracks); recording (track 1)
- Tony Cousins – mastering (all tracks)
- Davide Rossi – string recording (track 9)

=== Artwork ===
- Natasha Khan – art direction, concept
- Neil Krug – photography
- Michael Whitham – commissioning
- Tamara Cincik - stylist
- Richard Welland – design

== Charts ==
Chart (2016)	Peak position
Australian Albums (ARIA)	40
Belgian Albums (Ultratop Flanders)	38
Belgian Albums (Ultratop Wallonia)	42
French Albums (SNEP)	101
Hungarian Albums (MAHASZ)	19
Irish Albums (IRMA)	18
New Zealand Albums (RMNZ)	32
Scottish Albums (OCC)	9
Swiss Albums (Schweizer Hitparade)	28
UK Albums (OCC)	9
US Top Alternative Albums (Billboard)	17
US Top Rock Albums (Billboard)	24
