= The Vampire Diaries (soundtrack) =

The Vampire Diaries (Original Television Soundtrack)

Soundtrack album by various artists
- Released: October 12, 2010
- Length: 64:05
- Label: Virgin

The Vampire Diaries (Original Television Soundtrack) is the soundtrack to the CW television series The Vampire Diaries. It was released on October 12, 2010 and features song from Jason Walker, Placebo, Bat for Lashes, Mads Langer, Plumb, the Smashing Pumpkins, amongst several others.

== Critical reception ==
A critic based at The Line of Best Fit wrote "The Vampire Diaries OTS is a well-compiled mix from established artists, making it an easy, likeable listen for fans of vampyric creatures and decent music alike." Frank Mojica of Consequence assigned a C− to the album, saying "The Vampire Diaries: Original Television Soundtrack satisfies all these expectations with a hit-or-miss collection of songs. It may not be the most thrilling compilation of the year, but it gets the job done." Charlie Doherty of Seattle Post-Intelligencer wrote "The Vampire Diaries: Original Television Soundtrack does a fine job of bringing beauty into the dark vampire world, as heard on the show itself, and including a passable balance of rock and dance-pop tracks." In a three-and-a-half star review, Kim Gillespie of The New Zealand Herald called it as "worth getting your teeth into". Katie Territt of Stereoboard wrote "The songs soundtrack the show's themes perfectly, but also stand up on their own as quality music made by fantastic artists."

== Track listing ==
The Vampire Diaries (Original Television Soundtrack) track listing
No.	Title	Artist(s)	Length
1.	"Stefan's Theme"	Michael Suby	1:16
2.	"Running Up That Hill"	Placebo	4:53
3.	"Currency of Love"	Silversun Pickups	5:29
4.	"Hammock"	Howls	2:57
5.	"Sleep Alone" (909S In Darktimes Mix)	Bat for Lashes	4:32
6.	"Bloodstream" (Vampire Diaries Remix)	Stateless	5:11
7.	"We Radiate"	Goldfrapp	3:45
8.	"Obsession"	Sky Ferreira	3:42
9.	"Head Over Heels"	Digital Daggers	4:18
10.	"Down"	Jason Walker	4:05
11.	"Beauty of the Dark"	Mads Langer	3:57
12.	"Cut"	Plumb	3:59
13.	"All You Wanted"	Sounds Under Radio; Alison Sudol	5:17
14.	"The Fellowship"	The Smashing Pumpkins	3:50
15.	"On Melancholy Hill" (Feed Me Remix)	Gorillaz	5:10
16.	"1864"	Michael Suby	1:44
Total length:			64:05

== Chart performance ==
Chart performance for The Vampire Diaries (Original Television Soundtrack)
Chart (2010–2011)	Peak position
UK Album Downloads (OCC)	70
UK Compilation Albums (OCC)	37
UK Soundtrack Albums (OCC)	3
US Billboard 200	106
US Top Soundtracks (Billboard)	6
