= Kids in the Dark =

Kids in the Dark may refer to:

- "Kids in the Dark", a 2015 song by All Time Low from their 2015 album Future Hearts
- "Kids in the Dark", a 2019 song by Bat for Lashes from her 2019 album Lost Girls
