= Join the dots =

Join the dots may refer to:

- Join the Dots (The Nextmen album), 2009
- Join the Dots (Toy album), 2013
- Join The Dots, a shortened name of Join the Dots: B-Sides & Rarities 1978–2001 (The Fiction Years), a box set of The Cure released in 2004
- "Join The Dots," a song by Roots Manuva from his 2001 album Run Come Save Me
- Connect the dots, a kind of paper puzzle
