= The Haunted Man =

The Haunted Man may refer to:

- The Haunted Man and the Ghost's Bargain, an 1848 novella by Charles Dickens
- The Haunted Man (album), a 2012 album by British musician Bat for Lashes
