= Fur and Gold =

2006 studio album by Bat for Lashes

Studio album by Bat for Lashes
- Released: 11 September 2006
- Recorded: 2006
- Studio: Jacobs Studio
- Genre: Folktronica
- Length: 46:47
- Label: Echo
- Producers: Natasha Khan; David Kosten

Bat for Lashes chronology
Fur and Gold (2006)	Two Suns (2009)

Singles from Fur and Gold
- 1. "The Wizard" Released: 8 May 2006; 2. "Trophy" Released: 30 October 2006; 3. "Prescilla" Released: 12 March 2007; 4. "What's a Girl to Do?" Released: 9 July 2007

Fur and Gold is the debut studio album by English singer Bat for Lashes, released on 11 September 2006 by The Echo Label. It was met with critical acclaim and received a nomination for the 2007 Mercury Prize. In 2007, the album was re-released through Parlophone. Fur and Gold spawned the singles "The Wizard", "Trophy", "Prescilla", and "What's a Girl to Do?". In 2008, "What's a Girl to Do?" was re-released as a 12-inch vinyl with a remix featuring Scroobius Pip and Plaid. As of April 2009, Fur and Gold had sold 27,000 copies in United States.

== Background ==
Recorded in London, Brighton and Jacobs Studio in one month, the album was co-produced by Natasha Khan. Producer David Kosten was "pleasantly shocked" that Khan was so prepared when they started working on the album because she "had pages of notes", with "each song had quotes from different films that made me think of it and different sounds and visual images and bits of poetry and drawings."

== Music ==
Journalist Garry Mulholland wrote that singer Natasha Khan and producer David Kosten "reinvent Siouxsie / [Kate] Bush/ Björk mystical sex, musical travelogue and poetic dreamstate for the contemporary singer-songwriter milieu". Magic described the song "What’s A Girl To Do?" as such: "starting with an original drumbeat of the Ronettes and embracing modernity in the form of a rudimentary drum machine, before returning to its 1960's trademarks with the help of a simple drum. Not to spoil anything, the chorus irremediably evokes the divine "Arabian Knights" of Siouxsie and the Banshees".

The album opener, "Horse and I", came to Khan in a dream whilst working as a nursery school teacher. She said, "It was very vivid, and I suppose it’s a song about traveling and journeys and initiations into new places that are a bit frightening, too. All the words and the story came from that. At the time I was dreaming a lot, and I had this particularly strong dream of the horse coming to me and taking me through the forest and then to these ghosts of children singing. And there’s a crown there in this clearing, and it’s just this obvious symbol of me starting off on a journey." The vocals for the track were recorded in the woods.

Khan commented:

At the time someone had really pissed me off – some promoter or something – and he was really sexist and really smarmy. He made me feel really ill, so it was like ‘This is my trophy, I’m protecting it, so fuck off’. Y’know, but I don't want to be singing, like, ‘Don't touch my heart… it's soooo precious to me…’ or whatever. So I’m imagining this beautiful, precious thing – the trophy – and the landscape around it."

For "Bat's Mouth", Khan said that "we all ran across a huge meadow and set up mics, like 30 mics all the way around, and we shouted backing vocals." At the end of the track, "you can hear all this whooping and jubilation and girls shouting and laughing and that’s because we were probably a bit drunk at the time."

Khan was inspired by JT LeRoy's novel Sarah to write the homonymous track "Sarah".

The album revolves around the dream world, anthropomorphized animals, wizards, lost love and souls. Khan stated that it "was very much my vivid imaginary world, which was very internal, very much based on dreams and subconscious things and imagery."

== 20th anniversary ==
On 31 October 2025, Khan announced the release of a 20th anniversary remaster of the album, which was made available for streaming on the same day. It features the original remastered album and unreleased demos from 2005-6 and live versions. The album was remastered by Frank Arkwright at Abbey Road Studios.

The physical copies on 180g heavyweight audiophile black vinyl as well as an expanded double CD pack were released on 6 February 2026.

== Critical reception ==
Professional ratings
Aggregate scores
Source	Rating
Metacritic	81/100
Review scores
Source	Rating
AllMusic	5/5 stars
The A.V. Club	B+
Entertainment Weekly	A−
The Guardian	5/5 stars
The Independent	4/5 stars
Los Angeles Times	3.5/4 stars
Pitchfork	6.5/10
PopMatters	7/10
Slant Magazine	4/5 stars
URB	3.5/5 stars

Fur and Gold received widespread acclaim from music critics. At Metacritic, which assigns a normalised rating out of 100 to reviews from mainstream publications, the album received an average score of 81, based on 15 reviews.

== Track listing ==
All tracks are written by Natasha Khan, except where noted.

No.	Title	Length
1.	"Horse and I"	3:04
2.	"Trophy"	4:00
3.	"Tahiti"	3:38
4.	"What's a Girl to Do?"	2:58
5.	"Sad Eyes"	4:16
6.	"The Wizard"	4:17
7.	"Prescilla"	3:34
8.	"Bat's Mouth"	4:25
9.	"Seal Jubilee"	4:44
10.	"Sarah"	3:56
11.	"I Saw a Light"	6:24
Total length:		46:47

US edition and iTunes Store bonus track
No.	Title	Writer(s)	Length
12.	"I'm on Fire"	Bruce Springsteen	3:31
Total length:			48:33

20th anniversary reissue (Disc 2: Demos + Live)
No.	Title	Length
1.	"Carrie" (Demo)	4:31
2.	"Healing Fire" (Demo)	4:18
3.	"Rosie" (Demo)	5:07
4.	"Dark Time" (Demo)	4:30
5.	"Howl" (Demo)	3:37
6.	"Blood Red Shoes" (Demo)	4:35
7.	"Circle Song" (Demo)	3:33
8.	"What's a Girl To Do?" (BBC Live Lounge Version)	2:57
9.	"Tahiti" (BBC Rob da Bank Session)	3:30

== Personnel ==
Credits adapted from the liner notes of Fur and Gold.

=== Musicians ===
- Natasha Khan – vocals, string arrangements (all tracks); keyboards (tracks 1, 2, 4, 6, 9, 10); piano (tracks 3, 5–9, 11); percussion (tracks 1, 2, 4, 6, 7, 10); drums (tracks 2, 4, 6); Hammond organ (track 5); autoharp (track 7); guitar, vibraphone (track 9); sounds (track 11); harmonium (track 6)
- Abi Fry – viola (tracks 1, 3, 8–11); string arrangements (all tracks)
- Caroline Weeks – autoharp (track 3); backing vocals (tracks 3, 6, 8); guitar (tracks 6–8)
- Mary Funnell – violin (track 8); string arrangements (all tracks)
- Anna McInerney – violin (track 8); string arrangements (all tracks)
- Tim Byford – drums (tracks 1, 4, 10, 11)
- Josh T. Pearson – guitar (tracks 2, 11); backing vocals (tracks 2, 9); intro vocals (track 11)
- Ben Christophers – bass, guitar (tracks 4, 6, 10)
- Sophie Sirota – violin (tracks 1, 2, 8)
- Howard Gott – violin (tracks 1, 2, 8)
- Emma Ramsdale – harp (tracks 1, 4)
- Tim Hutton – trumpet, trombone (track 10)
- Rachael T. Sell – backing vocals (track 10)
- Will Lemon – spoken word intro (track 11)
- Mikee Goodman – vocal sea sounds (track 9)
- David Kosten – keyboards (track 9); special foot taps (track 8); additional keyboards, programming (all tracks)

=== Technical ===
- David Kosten – production, recording, mixing
- Natasha Khan – production
- Tim Young – mastering

=== Artwork ===
- Bohdan Cap – cover photo
- Peter Moyse – band photo
- Natasha Khan – album artwork
- Red Design – design, layout

== Charts ==
Chart (2007)	Peak position
French Albums (SNEP)	130
Scottish Albums (Official Charts)	64
UK Albums (Official Charts)	48

== Certifications ==
Region	Certification	Certified units/sales
United Kingdom (BPI)	Gold	100,000^{^}
^{^} Shipments figures based on certification alone.

== Release history ==
Region	Date	Edition	Label	Ref.
United Kingdom	11 September 2006	Standard	The Echo Label	
France	2 July 2007	Standard	EMI	
United Kingdom	16 July 2007	Reissue	Parlophone	
Australia	27 July 2007	Standard	Spunk; She Bear	
United States	31 July 2007	Standard	Caroline; Manimal Vinyl	
Germany	2 November 2007	Standard	EMI	
