= Geowulf =

Australian dream pop duo

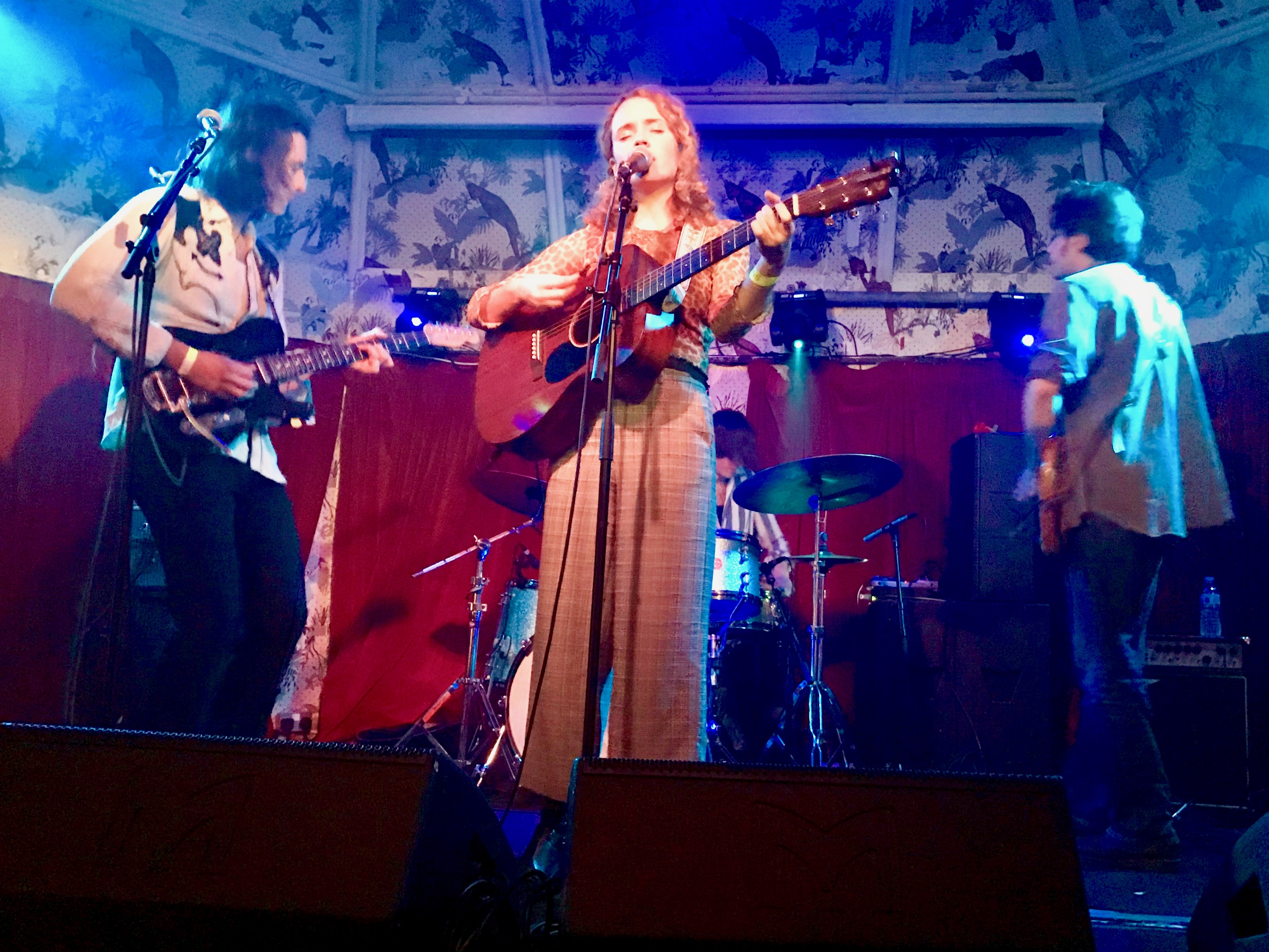
- Geowulf performing "Saltwater" at the Deaf Institute in Manchester, England, 2019

Background information
- Origin: Sunshine Coast, Queensland, Australia
- Genres: Dream pop; indie pop; lo-fi
- Years active: 2016–present
- Labels: 37 Adventures; PIAS; Nettwerk
- Members: Star Kendrick
- Past members: Toma Banjanin

Geowulf is an Australian dream pop project formed in Sunshine Coast, Queensland as a duo by Star Kendrick and Toma Banjanin in 2016. Geowulf is currently based in London, England. The band name is a portmanteau of the Old English poem Beowulf and "geo", meaning "earth".

As of 2026, Geowulf is Kendrick's solo project after Banjanin departed in late 2022.

== History ==
In 2017, Geowulf released their debut extended play (EP), Relapse, containing four songs including "Saltwater", their first single. "Saltwater" was originally released as a single in 2016, and was a part of the 37 Adventures compilation album Odd Numbers Volume 1.

Geowulf's debut studio album, Great Big Blue, was released on 16 February 2018. Their second studio album, My Resignation, was released on 25 October 2019. The singles "I See Red", "He's 31", "Lonely" and "My Resignation" were all released in advance of the album.

In September 2021, Geowulf released the single "I've Been Over It", their first release of new music in nearly two years. This would be followed by several singles over the next year: "Open Me Up", "Drown", "Lover That Waits" and "Whirlwind". All five singles formed the EP Whirlwind, released on 15 July 2022 to coincide with the single of the same name.

In December 2022, Star Kendrick announced that Toma Banjanin would be taking a step back from Geowulf, effectively turning it into Kendrick's solo project. The single "Must Be a Woman" marked the first Geowulf release without Banjanin. This was followed by the singles "Slow Dance" and "Lovestruck", all of which would appear on Kendrick's third EP Woman, released in 2023.

Geowulf's third studio album The Child was released on 17 January 2025, and was preceded by six singles. Kendrick continued releasing singles throughout 2025, which culminated in the release of the four-song EP Twinkly Depression on 24 October. The EP was preceded by the singles "Broken Hearts", "Top Down" and "Champagne", as well as the standalone single "Visions of Ourselves".

== Members ==
- Star Kendrick
- Toma Banjanin

== Discography ==
=== Studio albums ===
Title	Release details
Great Big Blue	Release date: 16 February 2018; Label: PIAS; Formats: CD, LP, streaming, digital download
My Resignation	Release date: 25 October 2019; Label: PIAS; Formats: CD, LP, streaming, digital download
The Child	Release date: 17 January 2025; Label: Nettwerk; Formats: LP, streaming, digital download

=== EPs ===
Title	Release details
Relapse	Release date: 2 June 2017; Label: 37 Adventures; Formats: Digital download
Whirlwind	Release date: 15 July 2022; Label: Self-released; Formats: Digital download
Woman	Release date: 1 September 2023; Label: Nettwerk; Formats: Digital download
Twinkly Depression	Release date: 24 October 2025; Label: Nettwerk; Formats: Digital download

=== Singles ===
List of singles, showing year released and album name
Title	Year	Album
"Saltwater"	2016	Great Big Blue
"Don't Talk About You"	2017	Great Big Blue
"Won't Look Back"	2017	Great Big Blue
"Get You"	2017	Great Big Blue
"Drink Too Much"	2017	Great Big Blue
"Hideaway"	2017	Great Big Blue
"Sunday"	2018	Great Big Blue
"Teardrops" (Womack & Womack cover)	2018	Non-album single
"I See Red"	2019	My Resignation
"He's 31"	2019	My Resignation
"Lonely"	2019	My Resignation
"My Resignation"	2019	My Resignation
"I've Been Over It"	2021	Whirlwind
"Open Me Up"	2021	Whirlwind
"Drown"	2022	Whirlwind
"Lover That Waits"	2022	Whirlwind
"Whirlwind"	2022	Whirlwind
"Must Be a Woman"	2022	Woman
"Lovestruck"	2023	Woman
"Slow Dance"	2023	Woman
"Flametree"	2023	Woman
"Dolly"	2024	The Child
"Something Good"	2024	The Child
"Nightmare"	2024	The Child
"Memory Serves Like Lightning"	2024	The Child
"Dreaming"	2024	The Child
"Stay Baby"	2024	The Child
"Visions of Ourselves"	2025	Non-album single
"Broken Hearts"	2025	Twinkly Depression
"Top Down"	2025	Twinkly Depression
"Champagne"	2025	Twinkly Depression
"Never Stop Looking at Me"	2025	Non-album single
