= Pearl's Dream =

Single by Bat for Lashes

from the album Two Suns
- Released: 22 June 2009
- Genre: Dream pop
- Length: 3:47 (radio edit); 4:45 (album version)
- Label: Parlophone
- Songwriter: Natasha Khan
- Producers: Natasha Khan, David Kosten

Bat for Lashes singles chronology
"Daniel" (2009)	"Pearl's Dream" (2009)	"Sleep Alone" (2009)

Music video
- "Pearl's Dream" (Official video) on YouTube

"Pearl's Dream" is a song by English recording artist Bat for Lashes from her second studio album Two Suns (2009). "Pearl's Dream" was announced as the second single when the song was made available for MySpace users to remix in May 2009, then the full single was released in the UK in June 2009, as a download and 7". The download single includes two live songs, the album version, a radio edit and a remix of "Sleep Alone"; the 7" comprises the radio edit and the "Sleep Alone" remix.

== Track listings ==
Download

1. "Pearl's Dream" (album version) – 4:45
2. "Pearl's Dream" (Cenzo Townshend radio edit) – 3:47
3. "Sleep Alone" (909s in DarkTimes Mix) – 4:20
4. "Siren Song" (Live at Shepherd's Bush Empire) – 4:54
5. "Good Love" (Live at Shepherd's Bush Empire) – 5:20

7"

1. "Pearl's Dream" (radio edit) – 3:47
2. "Sleep Alone" (909s in DarkTimes Mix) – 4:20

== Music video ==
Bat for Lashes noticing Pearl, with the wolf in the background in the music video, "Pearl's Dream".

The video for "Pearl's Dream" starts with Khan rising from a mist to find herself on a stage facing an empty auditorium. As Khan starts to dance, we see the planets and night sky glowing around her. A wolf appears with Khan, and seems to examine the surroundings. Khan then notices a blond woman in the audience, which we assume to be Pearl. Pearl watches Khan's show, seemingly unimpressed at first, but as it progresses she seems to become scared and makes her way slowly toward the stage, reaching to grab Khan by the neck as the wolf snarls and growls at her. The planets above shoot a laser at Pearl, effectively destroying her. She leaves behind her clothes and blond hair as if she has been disintegrated. The video then ends with stars falling from the sky onto Khan.

The video was directed by Nima Nourizadeh.

== Release history ==
Region	Date	Label	Format	Catalogue
UK	21 June 2009	Parlophone	Download	
UK	22 June 2009	Parlophone	7"	R6773

== Charts ==
Chart (2009)	Peak position
UK Singles Chart	173
