= Toy (Toy album) =

Studio album by Toy
- Released: 10 September 2012
- Recorded: 2012
- Genre: Shoegazing; indie rock; post-rock
- Length: 58:02
- Label: Heavenly
- Producer: Dan Carey; Ant Theaker

Toy chronology
Toy (2012)	Join the Dots (2013)

Professional ratings
Aggregate scores
Source	Rating
AnyDecentMusic?	7.3/10
Metacritic	77/100
Review scores
Source	Rating
AllMusic	3.5/5 stars
Alternative Press	4/5 stars
Clash	8/10
The Guardian	4/5 stars
The Irish Times	4/5 stars
Mojo	4/5 stars
NME	8/10
The Observer	3/5 stars
Q	3/5 stars
Uncut	6/10

Toy is the debut studio album by English indie rock band Toy, released on 10 September 2012 by Heavenly Recordings.

The album was recorded in early 2012 by Dan Carey at his South London studio. The cover art was designed by artist Leif Podhajsky

== Track listing ==
No.	Title	Length
1.	"Colours Running Out"	3:54
2.	"The Reasons Why"	3:54
3.	"Dead & Gone"	7:39
4.	"Lose My Way"	4:26
5.	"Drifting Deeper"	4:55
6.	"Motoring"	4:33
7.	"Heart Skips a Beat"	4:23
8.	"Strange"	4:53
9.	"Make It Mine"	3:53
10.	"Omni"	1:27
11.	"Walk Up to Me"	4:06
12.	"Kopter"	9:50

== Personnel ==
Credits adapted from the liner notes of Toy.

=== Toy ===
- Tom Dougall – vocals, guitar
- Dominic O'Dair – guitars
- Alejandra Diez – synths
- Maxim Barron – bass, vocals
- Charlie Salvidge – drums, vocals

=== Technical ===
- Dan Carey – production (tracks 1–5, 7–12); mixing (all tracks)
- Oli Bayston – engineering
- Alexis Smith – engineering
- Ant Theaker – production (track 6)

=== Artwork ===
- Steve Gullick – photography
- Sean Gallagher – artwork, design
- Leif Podhajsky – cover artwork

== Chart ==
Weekly chart performance for Toy
Chart (2012)	Peak position
Scottish Albums (OCC)	83
UK Albums (OCC)	48
