= Two Suns =

2009 studio album by Bat for Lashes

Studio album by Bat for Lashes
- Released: 6 April 2009
- Recorded: 2008–2009
- Studio: Bryn Derwen (Bethesda, Wales) (Note: Tracks 1–7 and 10); DK (London) (Note: All tracks); Natasha's house (Brighton, England) (Note: Tracks 1, 2, 4, 7 and 8); Megan's house (New York City) (Note: Tracks 1 and 9); Magic Shop (New York City) (Note: Tracks 2, 4 and 7); Stratosphere Sound (New York City) (Note: Track 5); Vacation Island (New York City) (Note: Track 8); OneForest (Mountainhome, Pennsylvania) (Note: Track 10); Metropolis (London) (Note: Scott Walker's vocals on track 11)
- Genre: Art rock
- Length: 45:08
- Label: Echo; Parlophone
- Producer: Natasha Khan; David Kosten

Bat for Lashes chronology
Fur and Gold (2006)	Two Suns (2009)	The Haunted Man (2012)

Alternative cover
- Special edition cover

Singles from Two Suns
- 1. "Daniel" Released: 1 March 2009; 2. "Pearl's Dream" Released: 22 June 2009; 3. "Sleep Alone" Released: 7 September 2009

Two Suns is the second studio album by English singer Natasha Khan, known professionally as Bat for Lashes. It was released on 6 April 2009 by The Echo Label and Parlophone. The album was produced by Khan herself and David Kosten (who also worked on her debut album Fur and Gold), and features collaborations with members of Yeasayer and Scott Walker. Two Suns was recorded in segments in California, New York City, London, Brighton and Wales.

Upon its release, Two Suns was met with positive reviews from most critics. Additionally, it was shortlisted for the Mercury Prize in 2009, Khan's second nomination after Fur and Gold in 2007. On 31 July 2009, Two Suns was certified gold by the British Phonographic Industry (BPI), for shipments of 100,000 copies in the United Kingdom. It debuted at number two on Billboard's Heatseekers Albums chart and has sold 56,000 copies in United States, according to Nielsen SoundScan. As of June 2012, the album had sold 250,000 copies worldwide.

== Concept and background ==
According to the accompanying press release, Two Suns is "a record of modern-day fables exploring dualities on a number of levels—two lovers, two planets, two sides of a personality", bringing reflection about "the philosophy of the self and duality, examining the need for both chaos and balance, for both love and pain, in addition to touching on metaphysical ideas concerning the connections between all existence." In Two Suns, Khan also presents an alter ego named Pearl, described by the press release as "a destructive, self-absorbed, blonde, femme fatale of a persona who acts as a direct foil to Khan's more mystical, desert-born spiritual self." The dress worn on the cover is a collaboration between Khan and designer Alexander McQueen.

According to Khan, "Two Suns is about human relationships and the use of illusion to try to see beautiful things during a hard time." It was inspired by her break-up with Will Lemon, who she met while recording her debut album, Fur and Gold. The album "takes you through this whole journey, all the way to the end of the relationship and the end of making the record. So it's kind of like this strange, synonymous cycle that happened. And then obviously the album's called Two Suns, so there's this kind of like "two planets" situation. Just the whole theme of planets chasing each other, you know, night and day chasing each other eternally, and being in England and New York and being separated by an ocean, and lots of different types of landscapes, different types of personalities, and internal conflict."

The recording of Two Suns began in 2008 and took five months to complete. It was written and recorded around the world, from Big Sur and the Joshua Tree desert in California to the rolling Welsh countryside and the city sprawls of New York and London.

When Khan started to work on the album, she set out to make an album that was "vocally stronger" than Fur and Gold, with "more lush electronic sounds and tribal rhythms". She believed that living in Brooklyn when bands such as TV on the Radio, MGMT and Gang Gang Dance were emerging on the music scene had an influence on the album's musical style.

Khan stated that she began working on the album with the intention of not compromising her artistic vision. She said, "I went to the recording studio and told the record company that they weren’t allowed to come. I got one email about feedback, asking me to drop certain tracks, and I said no." When she played the finished album to the record company Parlophone, she wasn't present, but she did receive some feedback. "They said, ‘Natasha, you’ve made a great album.’ But there were a few mutterings around like, ‘Natasha you’ve made a great album, but what are we going to do with it? Radio aren’t going to play it, y’know?’ They were happy for me on an artistic level, but I made their job a lot harder."

== Promotion ==
"Daniel" was released on 1 March 2009 as the album's lead single, reaching number 36 on the UK singles chart. Both "Siren Song" and the 909s in DarkTimes mix of "Sleep Alone" were featured in the first season of the American television series The Vampire Diaries, while only the latter was included on the series' soundtrack album. the instrumental version of "Siren Song" was also used in Season 15 of Top Gear, in Episode 3, as well as the tribute to Ayrton Senna. The song "Glass" was used in the trailer for the 2012 video game Assassin's Creed III: Liberation.

== Critical reception ==
Professional ratings
Aggregate scores
Source	Rating
AnyDecentMusic?	7.4/10
Metacritic	76/100
Review scores
Source	Rating
AllMusic	3.5/5 stars
The A.V. Club	B+
The Daily Telegraph	4/5 stars
The Guardian	4/5 stars
MSN Music (Consumer Guide)	C
NME	8/10
Pitchfork	8.5/10
Q	4/5 stars
Rolling Stone	3.5/5 stars
Spin	8/10

Two Suns received generally positive reviews from music critics. At Metacritic, which assigns a normalised rating out of 100 to reviews from mainstream publications, the album received an average score of 76, based on 32 reviews. Kevin Liedel of Slant Magazine called it "dark, but never needlessly so", and wrote that it "offers a rich, distinct world of subterranean lullabies, spacey timbres, and ghostly beauty." Mark Pytlik of Pitchfork called it a "significant step forward from her debut" and "home to some of the year's most thrilling music so far." Tim Chester of NME described Two Suns as "a brilliant pop album", commenting that it is "epic in scope and ambition and requires a similarly epic patience to unravel its charms". Barry Walters of Spin wrote that "this art-rock Joan of Arc gushes duality motifs that thwart narrative but overflow with moonstruck sensuality." The A.V. Club's Sean O'Neal commented that "Khan's sublime voice easily distracts from any lyrical ponderousness, and it lends even lines about 'diamonds burning through rainbows' a dreamy sort of sense." The Guardian's Dorian Lynskey called it "fantastic as well as fantastical", noting that "[w]hereas her debut relied on charisma and imagination to paper over the songwriting cracks, [Two Suns] is agleam with striking melodies". Melissa Maerz of Rolling Stone felt that "[s]omehow, the music melts away the potential for hokeyness ... Khan proves she's a powerhouse under her billowy sleeves."

AllMusic's Heather Phares complimented Khan's "considerable skills at telling a story and setting a mood", but critiqued that "the album's massive concepts and sounds require a little more time and patience to unravel to get to the songs' hearts. It's clear that Khan's talent and ambition are both huge". PopMatters' Erin Lyndal Martin felt that Khan "can do much better than some of the songs, which are weakened by synths, sophomoric lyrics, and sonic clutter." Martin continued, "While the weaker songs are definitely not throwaways, they miss the mark in more than one way." Andy Gill of The Independent found its "patina and keyboard tones" "blander" than Fur and Gold's music and said that it is difficult to "take Khan's stories seriously when she slips into blather about 'a stranger in a strange land' and 'a vast and unknowable universe'." Robert Christgau of MSN Music found her "as ill-informed about astronomy as she is about love" and the musical experimentation "unworthy of your brainlength".

Slant Magazine placed the album at number 97 on its list of the best albums of the 2000s decade.

== Track listing ==
All tracks are written by Natasha Khan, except where noted.

No.	Title	Length
1.	"Glass"	4:32
2.	"Sleep Alone"	4:04
3.	"Moon and Moon"	3:09
4.	"Daniel"	4:11
5.	"Peace of Mind"	3:29
6.	"Siren Song"	4:58
7.	"Pearl's Dream"	4:45
8.	"Good Love"	4:30
9.	"Two Planets"	4:48
10.	"Travelling Woman"	3:48
11.	"The Big Sleep"	2:54

iTunes Store bonus track
No.	Title	Length
12.	"Wilderness"	3:59

Special edition bonus tracks
No.	Title	Writer(s)	Length
12.	"Wilderness"		3:59
13.	"Sleep Alone" (909s in DarkTimes Mix)		4:32
14.	"Daniel" (Lo Fi)		4:01
15.	"A Forest"	Simon Gallup; Matthieu Hartley; Robert Smith; Lol Tolhurst	3:16
16.	"Use Somebody" (Lo Fi)	Caleb Followill; Jared Followill; Matthew Followill; Nathan Followill	2:29
17.	"Good Love" (live – Shepherd's Bush Empire, 19 April 2009)		5:20
18.	"Daniel" (live – Radiohead Tour, Nîmes, 14 June 2008)		4:22
19.	"Lonely" (live – Koko, 29 October 2007)	Tom Waits	3:56

Special edition bonus DVD
No.	Title	Length
1.	"Two + Two (The Making of Two Suns) Documentary"	49:06

Japanese edition bonus tracks
No.	Title	Writer(s)	Length
12.	"Wilderness"		3:59
13.	"Sleep Alone" (909s in DarkTimes Mix)		4:32
14.	"Pearl's Dream" (Gang Gang Dance Remix)		8:15
15.	"Daniel" (Lo Fi)		4:01
16.	"Use Somebody" (Lo Fi)	C. Followill; J. Followill; M. Followill; N. Followill	2:29
17.	"Good Love" (live – Shepherd's Bush Empire, 19 April 2009)		5:20
18.	"Daniel" (live – Radiohead Tour, Nîmes, 14 June 2008)		4:22

== Personnel ==
Credits adapted from the liner notes of Two Suns.

=== Musicians ===
- Natasha Khan – lead vocals (all tracks); backing vocals (tracks 1–8, 10); synths (tracks 1, 2, 4–9, 11); drum programming (tracks 1, 2, 4, 7, 9); guitar (tracks 2, 4, 5); piano (tracks 3, 6, 8, 10, 11); harmonium (track 3); handclaps (tracks 3, 7, 9); percussion (tracks 3, 4, 5, 8, 9); string machine (track 4); drums (tracks 4, 5); bass synth (tracks 4, 6, 8); vibraphone (tracks 6, 9); organ (tracks 8, 10)
- Ben Christophers – Marxophone, pianochord (track 1); synths (tracks 1, 4); guitar (track 5); phonofiddle (track 6)
- Caroline Weeks – backing vocals (tracks 1, 3); synths, bells (track 1); flute (tracks 1, 6); handclaps, percussion (track 3)
- Kath Mann – backing vocals, saw (track 1); violin (track 4); viola (track 6)
- Alex Thomas – drums (tracks 1, 6, 10); percussion (tracks 1, 4); timpani (track 6)
- David Kosten – drum programming (tracks 1, 2, 4, 7, 9); synths (tracks 2, 5, 7); percussion (tracks 2, 7, 9); synth drone (track 6); toms, fingers (track 9)
- Abi Fry – viola (track 1)
- Adem – sampled wine glasses (track 1)
- Ira Wolf Tuton – bass (tracks 2, 4, 7)
- Chris Keating – drum programming (tracks 2, 7)
- Devin Maxwell – timpani (track 4)
- Devon Dunaway – backing vocals (track 5)
- Robert Roseberry Jr. – backing vocals (track 5)
- Lydia Rhodes – backing vocals (track 5)
- Marcie Allen – backing vocals (track 5)
- Rachael Sell – backing vocals (track 8)
- Brian Hale – guitar (track 8)
- Louis P. Rogai Jr. – backing vocals (track 10)
- Tom Asselin – guitar (track 10)
- Scott Walker – additional vocals (track 11)

=== Technical ===
- Natasha Khan – production (all tracks); engineering (tracks 1, 2, 4, 7, 8)
- David Kosten – production, engineering (all tracks); mixing (tracks 1–10)
- David Wrench – engineering (tracks 1–7, 10)
- Mark Eastwood – mixing assistance (track 1)
- Brian Thorn – engineering assistance (tracks 2, 4, 7)
- Mike Nesci – engineering (track 5)
- Matt Boynton – engineering (track 8)
- Tim Bader – engineering assistance (track 8)
- Tom Asselin – engineering (track 10)
- Matt Lawrence – vocal recording (Scott Walker's vocals) (track 11)

=== Artwork ===
- Natasha Khan – art direction, booklet artwork, concept
- David Benjamin Sherry – cover photography
- Tony Hornecker – set design
- Andrew Murabito – graphic design
- Dan Sanders – photographic production

== Charts ==
=== Weekly charts ===
Weekly chart performance for Two Suns
Chart (2009–2010)	Peak position
Australian Albums (ARIA)	95
Belgian Albums (Ultratop Flanders)	26
Belgian Albums (Ultratop Wallonia)	74
Croatian International Albums (HDU)	16
European Albums (Billboard)	21
Finnish Albums (Suomen virallinen lista)	39
French Albums (SNEP)	56
Greek International Albums (IFPI)	29
Irish Albums (IRMA)	17
Italian Albums (FIMI)	85
Scottish Albums (OCC)	14
Swiss Albums (Schweizer Hitparade)	94
UK Albums (OCC)	5
US Billboard 200	141
US Heatseekers Albums (Billboard)	2

=== Year-end charts ===
Year-end chart performance for Two Suns
Chart (2009)	Position
UK Albums (OCC)	132

== Certifications ==
Certifications for Two Suns
Region	Certification	Certified units/sales
United Kingdom (BPI)	Gold	100,000^{^}
^{^} Shipments figures based on certification alone.

== Release history ==
Release dates and formats for Two Suns
Region	Date	Format	Edition	Label	Ref.
Australia	3 April 2009	CD; digital download	Standard	Spunk	
Germany	3 April 2009	CD; digital download	Standard	EMI	
France	6 April 2009	CD; digital download	Standard	EMI	
United Kingdom	6 April 2009	CD; LP; digital download	Standard	Echo; Parlophone	
United States	7 April 2009	CD; LP; digital download	Standard	Astralwerks	
Finland	8 April 2009	CD; digital download	Standard	EMI	
Italy	17 April 2009	CD; digital download	Standard	EMI	
Germany	4 September 2009	CD+DVD	Special	EMI	
United Kingdom	7 September 2009	CD+DVD	Special	Echo; Parlophone	
Finland	9 September 2009	CD+DVD	Special	EMI	
France	5 October 2009	CD+DVD	Special	EMI	
United States	3 November 2009	CD+DVD	Special	Astralwerks	
Japan	6 January 2010	CD; digital download	Standard	P-Vine	
