= Joe's Dream =

Single by Bat for Lashes

from the album The Bride
- Released: 7 June 2016
- Recorded: 2015
- Genre: Dream pop, rock
- Length: 5:25
- Label: Parlophone
- Songwriter: Natasha Khan
- Producer: Khan

Bat for Lashes singles chronology
"Sunday Love" (2016)	"Joe's Dream" (2016)

Music video
- "Joe's Dream (Official video)" on YouTube

"Joe's Dream" is a song by English singer and songwriter Natasha Khan, professionally known as Bat for Lashes. It was written and produced by Natasha Khan. The song was released on 7 June 2016 by Parlophone, as the third single from The Bride. A music video, directed by John de Menil and Natasha Khan, was released on 1 September 2016.

== Critical response ==
The song received very positive reviews.

== Music video ==
A music video for "Joe's Dream" was released on 1 September 2016. It shows Khan wearing a red dress and playing guitar at a wedding chapel.

== Track listing ==
- Digital download
1. "Joe's Dream" – 5:25
