= Happy in the Hollow =

Studio album by Toy
- Released: 25 January 2019
- Genre: Indie rock
- Length: 48:57
- Label: Tough Love

Toy chronology
Clear Shot (2016)	Happy in the Hollow (2019)

Professional ratings
Aggregate scores
Source	Rating
Metacritic	78/100
Review scores
Source	Rating
AllMusic	3.5/5 stars
DIY	4/5 stars
MusicOMH	3.5/5 stars
Paste	8.4/10

Happy in the Hollow is the fourth studio album by English band Toy. It was released on 25 January 2019 through Tough Love Records.

== Track listing ==
No.	Title	Length
1.	"Sequence One"	4:17
2.	"Mistake a Stranger"	4:23
3.	"Energy"	4:07
4.	"Last Warmth of the Day"	4:59
5.	"The Willo"	7:08
6.	"Jolt Awake"	4:06
7.	"Mechanism"	3:53
8.	"Strangulation Day"	3:44
9.	"You Make Me Forget Myself"	5:05
10.	"Charlie’s House"	3:11
11.	"Move Through the Dark"	4:04

== Charts ==
Chart	Peak position
UK Albums (Official Charts)	71
