= Sleep Alone (Bat for Lashes song) =

"Sleep Alone"/"Moon and Moon"

Single by Bat for Lashes

from the album Two Suns
- Released: 6 September 2009
- Genre: Art rock, dance-pop
- Length: 3:11 (radio edit); 4:04 (album version)
- Label: Parlophone
- Songwriter: Natasha Khan
- Producers: Natasha Khan, David Kosten

Bat for Lashes singles chronology
"Pearl's Dream" (2009)	"Sleep Alone"/"Moon and Moon" (2009)	"Laura" (2012)

"Sleep Alone" is the third single from Bat for Lashes' second album Two Suns, released on 6 September 2009 as a download-only double A-side single with "Moon and Moon". The song was announced to be the third single on Bat for Lashes' official website. Bat for Lashes performed "Sleep Alone" live on Late Night with Jimmy Fallon on 12 August 2009.

== Background and release ==
The song has a 1980s feel to it. Natasha Khan (aka Bat for Lashes) explained to BBC's Newsbeat: "Well, I've always been an '80s girl, and I think [on] the first record I was quite shy really and I wanted to just keep it how I'd been playing it in my bedroom. I grew up listening to The Cure and I loved early Madonna and Prince and all of that stuff, so I think what prompted me was just probably having more confidence to kind of reach out and reveal even more of myself and what I love and not be too shy about it."

== Track listing ==
Download

No.	Title	Length
1.	"Sleep Alone" (radio edit)	3:08
2.	"Moon and Moon"	3:07
3.	"Glass" (live on Sirius Satellite Radio, New York City)	3:50
4.	"Travelling Woman" (live on Sirius Satellite Radio, New York City)	3:26
5.	"Sleep Alone" (Van Rivers & The Subliminal Kid remix)	4:37
Total length:		18:08

== Music video ==
Bat for Lashes looking into the window of a shop in the music video, "Sleep Alone".

The video for "Sleep Alone" begins with Khan singing in her bedroom. In one shot, she seems to be drawing and in another shot, she is lying on her bed, facing what seems to be a paper robot. Another shot shows Khan standing outside a building which is seen to be under construction. As Khan sings, various shots of herself staring into a shop window and a television can be seen. In the next shot before the chorus, Khan is walking down a dark street whilst holding a paper bag. She is dressed in a red coat. She sees a group of people gathered on the floor, examining what seems to be little coloured light bulbs. Khan then walks past an initially dark shop, and the lights turn on as she walks by. She takes a closer look into the shop window and sees various objects, such a spinning disco ball, a turntable and she is attracted by a heart-shaped red plastic object. She hears something and quickly turns behind, and the group of people she saw previously throws the light bulbs at her. She then reaches into her paper bag and takes out the same heart-shaped red plastic object she saw in the shop. She returns to her room. The shot changes to Khan wearing a white dress and drawing on the paper what seems to be the construction of the heart-shaped red plastic object.

== Release history ==
Region	Date	Label	Format
UK	6 September 2009	Parlophone	Download
