= Join the Dots (Toy album) =

Studio album by TOY
- Released: 9 December 2013 (UK/EU); 10 December 2013 (US)
- Recorded: 2013
- Genre: Psychedelic rock, krautrock, shoegazing, indie rock
- Length: 60:43
- Label: Heavenly Recordings
- Producer: Dan Carey

TOY chronology
Toy (2012)	Join the Dots (2013)	Clear Shot (2016)

Singles from Join the Dots
- 1. "Join the Dots" Released: 20 October 2013

Join the Dots is the second studio album by British psychedelic rock band TOY, released on 9 December 2013 in the UK and through Europe, and on 17 December in the United States, through Heavenly Recordings. The band recorded the album with Dan Carey, who also produced their debut album, and it took twice as long as their first album to record and master. The first single to be released from the album was "Join the Dots", released in October, 2013, as a download and limited hand-stamped seven-inch vinyl. A limited edition of the album included the EP Join the Dubs containing five dub remixes.

== Reception ==
Professional ratings
Aggregate scores
Source	Rating
AnyDecentMusic?	6.9/10
Metacritic	72/100
Review scores
Source	Rating
AllMusic	4/5 stars
Clash	8/10
Exclaim!	5/10
The Guardian	3/5 stars
The Line of Best Fit	6/10
musicOMH	4/5 stars
NME	4/5 stars
Under the Radar	6.5/10 stars

Join the Dots received positive reviews from critics. On Metacritic, the album holds a score of 72/100 based on 17 reviews, indicating "generally favorable reviews".

== Track listing ==
1. "Conductor" - 7:08
2. "You Won't Be the Same" - 4:41
3. "As We Turn" - 4:09
4. "Join the Dots" - 7:57
5. "To a Death Unknown" - 5:02
6. "Endlessly" - 4:32
7. "It's Been So Long" - 4:03
8. "Left to Wander" - 4:08
9. "Too Far Gone to Know" - 5:07
10. "Frozen Atmosphere" - 4:05
11. "Fall Out of Love" - 9:51

=== Japanese bonus tracks ===
1. "Not On Your Own"
2. "Sequence"

== Personnel ==
- Maxim Barron – bass, vocals
- Tom Dougall – guitar, vocals
- Dominic O'Dair – guitar
- Alejandra Diez – synthesizer
- Charlie Salvidge – drums, vocals
- Dan Carey – mixing, production
- Alexis Smith - engineering
