= Sexwitch =

English rock band

- Genres: Krautrock, psychedelic folk
- Years active: 2015
- Spinoff of: Toy
- Members: Natasha Khan; Tom Dougall; Dominic O'Dair; Maxim Barron; Charlie Salvidge; Alejandra Diez; Dan Carey

Sexwitch are an English rock band comprising the songwriter Natasha Khan (Bat for Lashes) and the members of the English rock band Toy. On 25 September 2015, they released Sexwitch, comprising six cover versions of 1970s psychedelic and folk songs from Iran, Morocco, Thailand and the United States.

== Recording ==
Khan and Toy first collaborated in 2013 to cover "The Bride", a cover of "Aroos Khanom" by the Iranian artist Amir Rassaei. For Sexwitch, Khan and the producer, Dan Carey, invited Toy to record cover versions of "old weird psych records from different countries, strange folk mountain songs". They learned the songs and recorded them in a single take in one day.

== Release ==
On 24 August 2015, Sexwitch released a single, "Helelyos", online. Rolling Stone described it as a "hypnotic, Middle Eastern-infused groove". The Guardian said Sexwitch comprised "hypnotic, groove-based tracks that feature jagged post-punk guitars" and "shrieking crescendos". Sexwitch played their festival debut at Green Man in 2015.

== Sexwitch track list ==
No.	Title	Length
1.	"Ha Howa Ha Howa"	6:55
2.	"Helelyos"	4:43
3.	"Kassidat El Hakka"	7:54
4.	"Lam Plearn Kiew Bao"	3:57
5.	"Ghoroobaa Ghashangan"	4:42
6.	"War in Peace"	4:47
