= Daniel (Bat for Lashes song) =

2009 song by Bat for Lashes

Single by Bat for Lashes

from the album Two Suns
- Released: 1 March 2009
- Studio: Natasha Khan's house, Brighton; Bryn Derwen Studios, Wales; Magic Shop Studios, New York City; DK Studio, London
- Genre: Synth-pop; electropop; folktronica
- Length: 3:29 (radio edit); 4:09 (album version)
- Label: Parlophone
- Songwriter: Natasha Khan
- Producers: Natasha Khan; David Kosten

Bat for Lashes singles chronology
"What's a Girl to Do?" (2007)	"Daniel" (2009)	"Pearl's Dream" (2009)

"Daniel" is a song by English recording artist Bat for Lashes, from her second studio album, Two Suns. It is her best-selling single to date, selling over 46,000 copies worldwide. The song was announced as the lead single from Two Suns in January 2009, then released as a digital download single on 1 March 2009, and as a 7" vinyl single on 6 April 2009. The track was written by Natasha Khan and produced by David Kosten, as with all tracks on the album. Ira Wolf Tuton from Yeasayer provided the bass lines for the song and Khan did the rest of the instrumentation herself.

The single's cover features Khan with an image of the character Daniel LaRusso, from the film The Karate Kid, painted on her back. A character much like LaRusso also features at the end of the music video which goes with the song. The B-side of the 7", 'A Forest' is a cover version of the 1980 single by The Cure of the same name.

== Reception ==
"It's, like, the most frightening song on the record for me, because it's the most straightforward, naive and purposely simple song I've ever done. It's about teenage escapism and love and how simple things can be when you're a teenager in love, or how intense and beautiful it can be. I love songs like Pat Benatar's 'Love Is a Battlefield,' like when you sing them, you want to be leaning out the window of a car with the stars shining. And I felt like I wanted to encapsulate that feeling of abandon and love and sadness and melancholy, all at the same time."

— Natasha Khan's comment about the track, in an interview with MTV in April 2009

Digital Spy said that "Daniel" is "probably the most immediate thing Khan has recorded. Both synthy and mystical-sounding, and filled with poetic lyrics about "marble movie skies" and "the smell of cinders and rain," it could almost pass for a lost Stevie Nicks track from the early eighties. Khan's velvety voice, meanwhile, remains as enchanting as ever, so here's hoping a few more people get to hear it." NME said the song "relives ghostly memories of her first love and sounds like Fleetwood Mac's "Rhiannon" filtered through the weeping circuits of a broken-hearted android." Gigwise said "a poppy work of kosmik disko à la Empire of the Sun as a sexy working of electric violin and vocal overdubs are strapped to the beats and bones of a mythic love song." Pitchfork likewise gave it a highly positive reception, awarding the single 9/10, describing the vocals in the song as "alternately commanding and fragile" and describing the song as "her 'Running Up that Hill'." At the end of the year, Pitchfork also rated "Daniel" the 4th best song of the year. The video for "Daniel" was named the 11th best video of the year by Spin Magazine in their "Top 20 Best Videos of 2009" countdown.

== Music video ==
Khan being carried by the figures in the music video, "Daniel".

Directed by Johan Renck, the music video was released in March 2009. The music video starts with Khan in a room, alone, singing the song; and when the chorus sets in, black-clad "shadow" figures come from out of the dark and start to surround her. Khan appears undaunted as she continues singing. The figures touch her and pull her, and soon she is carried by them. Khan struggles to break free, but they hit her multiple times and she faints. The scene then changes to Khan driving a car, presumably escaping from the figures, looking scared and desperate. She seems unaware of the fact that the figures are on the roof of the car. While she drives, one of the figures enters the car from above to the backseat and caresses her shoulders. Khan gives a pleased expression while being caressed, possibly thinking it was Daniel, the man she is singing about in the song. When she turns around, she discovers to her shock that it is not Daniel, but the figure. She appears frightened and she turns the car left and right swiftly to shake the figure(s) off. The figures slowly disappear. As she continues driving, a boy (Daniel, dressed similarly to the character of Daniel LaRusso from the film The Karate Kid) appears in the middle of the street, and she stops the car and runs up to him and embraces him, and at the last shot she smiles into the camera, glad to find him.

At the MTV VMAs 2009, "Daniel" was nominated for best Breakthrough Video.

== Track listings ==
Download

1. "Daniel" – 4:09

7"

1. "Daniel" (Cenzo Townshend radio edit) – 3:29
2. "A Forest" – 3:09

Promo 12"

1. "Daniel" (Duke Dumont Remix) – 3:36
2. "Daniel" (Death Metal Disco Scene Remix) – 6:50
3. "Daniel" (Death Metal Disco Scene Dub) – 5:46

== Charts ==
Weekly chart performance for "Daniel"
Chart (2009)	Peak position
Belgium (Ultratop 50 Flanders)	47
Belgium (Ultratip Bubbling Under Wallonia)	22
UK Singles (OCC)	36

== Release history ==
Release history and formats for "Daniel"
Region	Date	Label	Format	Catalogue
United Kingdom	1 March 2009	Parlophone	Digital download	
United Kingdom	6 April 2009	Parlophone	7"	R6768

== Covers ==
- Paul Dempsey covered "Daniel" for Triple J's Like a Version. His version was included on Volume Seven of the compilation series.
- In 2009 Josh Reichmann did a folksier cover of the song for a Paper Bag Records covers compilation.

== Will Young version ==
"Daniel"

Single by Will Young

from the album Crying on the Bathroom Floor
- Released: 26 April 2021
- Length: 3:19
- Label: Cooking Vinyl
- Songwriter: Natasha Khan
- Producer: Richard X

Will Young singles chronology
"My Love" (2019)	"Daniel" (2021)	"Elizabeth Taylor" (2021)

British singer Will Young covered the song and released it on 26 April 2021 as the lead single from his eighth studio album Crying on the Bathroom Floor (2021). Its music video was also released the same day. "Daniel" did not enter the UK Singles Chart, but peaked at number 31 on the Official Singles Sales Chart Top 100 and number 29 on the UK Singles Downloads Chart.

=== Music video ===
A music video for "Daniel" was directed by Andrew John "W.I.Z." Whiston. It was released on 26 April 2021.

=== Track listing ===
Digital single

- "Daniel" (radio edit) – 3:19

Remix single

- "Daniel" (Sudlow remix) – 3:05

=== Charts ===
Weekly chart performance for "Daniel"
Chart (2022)	Peak position
UK Singles Downloads (OCC)	29
UK Singles Sales (OCC)	31

=== Release history ===
"Daniel" release history
Region	Date	Label	Format(s)	Ref(s)
United Kingdom	26 April 2021	Cooking Vinyl	Digital download; streaming	
