= Laura (Bat for Lashes song) =

2012 song by Bat for Lashes

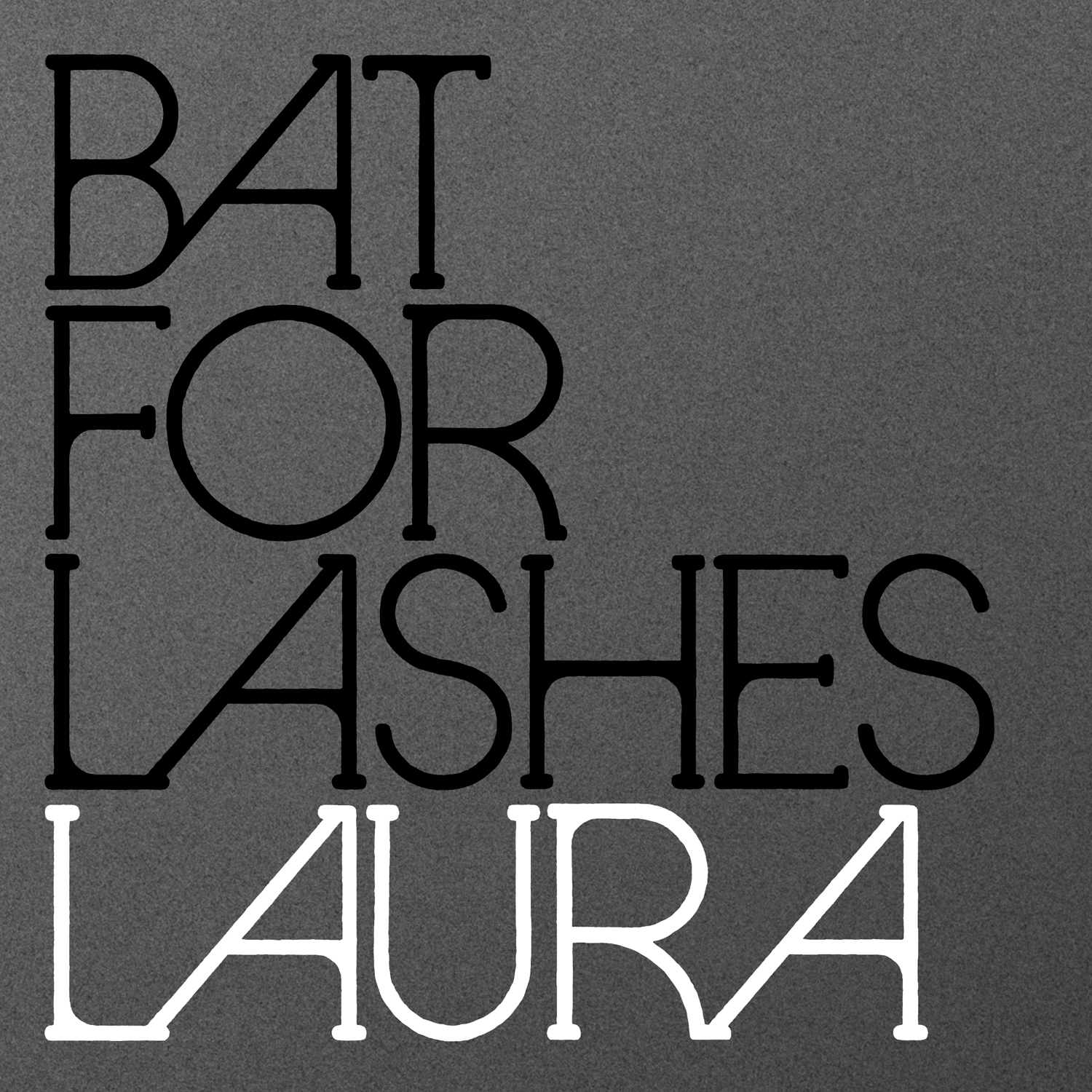

Single by Bat for Lashes

from the album The Haunted Man
- Released: 24 July 2012
- Recorded: 2010–2012
- Genre: Baroque pop
- Length: 4:27
- Label: Parlophone
- Songwriters: Natasha Khan, Justin Parker
- Producer: Natasha Khan

Bat for Lashes singles chronology
| "Sleep Alone" (2009) | "Laura" (2012) | "All Your Gold" (2012) |

"Laura" is a song by English recording artist Bat for Lashes for her third studio album The Haunted Man (2012). It was written by Natasha Khan and British songwriter Justin Parker. It received positive reactions from fans when Khan played it at a string of European festival dates. The song received its radio debut on 22 July 2012 on Zane Lowe's BBC Radio 1 show as "Hottest Record in the World" and was made available as an instant download to people who pre-ordered the album on iTunes.

== Chart performance ==
Chart performance for "Laura"
| Chart (2012) | Peak position |
|---|---|
| Australia (ARIA) | 90 |
| UK Singles (Official Charts Company) | 144 |

== Release history ==
Release history and formats for "Laura"
| Region | Date | Label | Format |
|---|---|---|---|
| United Kingdom | 23 July 2012 | Parlophone | Digital download |
