= Lost Girls (album) =

Studio album by Bat for Lashes
- Released: 6 September 2019
- Genre: Synth-pop
- Length: 38:23
- Labels: Bat for Lashes; AWAL
- Producers: Bat for Lashes; Charles Scott IV; Jennifer Decilveo; MNEK

Bat for Lashes chronology
The Bride (2016)	Lost Girls (2019)	The Dream of Delphi (2024)

Singles from Lost Girls
- 1. "Kids in the Dark" Released: 10 June 2019; 2. "Feel For You" Released: 26 July 2019; 3. "The Hunger" Released: 5 August 2019; 4. "Jasmine" Released: 19 August 2019

Lost Girls is the fifth studio album by English singer-songwriter Natasha Khan, known professionally as Bat for Lashes. It was released on 6 September 2019 through AWAL. It is Khan's follow up to 2016's The Bride. The lead single "Kids in the Dark" was released on 10 June 2019.

Khan has cited 1980s music and cinema as an inspiration for the record, citing artists such as Bananarama, Cyndi Lauper and The Blue Nile as well as film composer John Williams in an interview with The Line of Best Fit.

== Promotion ==
Khan teased a release on 10 June 2019 through early June, posting short videos to her social media accounts. One featured a snippet of music and a number for a hotline on a poster, which, when dialled, asked callers to leave a message about a lost girl named Nikki. Khan formally announced the album and release of the lead single on 10 June.

== Critical reception ==
Professional ratings
Aggregate scores
Source	Rating
Metacritic	76/100
Review scores
Source	Rating
AllMusic	4/5 stars
Clash	7/10
DIY	3.5/5 stars
Exclaim!	8/10
MusicOMH	4/5 stars
NME	4/5 stars
Paste	7/10
Pitchfork	7.2/10
Rolling Stone	3.5/5 stars

Lost Girls was met with generally favorable reviews from critics. At Metacritic, which assigns a weighted average rating out of 100 to reviews from mainstream publications, this release received an average score of 76, based on 22 reviews.

=== Accolades ===
Publication	Accolade	Rank	Ref.
Crack Magazine	Top 50 Albums of 2019	49	
Gaffa	Top 30 Albums of 2019	12	
Good Morning America	Top 50 Albums of 2019	1	
The Independent	The 50 best albums of the year - 2019	47	
MusicOMH	Top 50 Albums of 2019	44	
Rough Trade	Albums of the Year - 2019	19	
Under the Radar	Top 100 Albums of 2019	12	

== Track listing ==
Adapted from Apple Music.

No.	Title	Writer(s)	Producer(s)	Length
1.	"Kids in the Dark"	Natasha Khan; Charles Scott IV	Bat for Lashes; Scott	3:28
2.	"The Hunger"	Khan; Scott	Bat for Lashes; Scott	4:59
3.	"Feel for You"	Khan; Jennifer Decilveo	Bat for Lashes; Decilveo	3:39
4.	"Desert Man"	Khan; Jennifer Decilveo	Bat for Lashes; Decilveo; Scott	3:26
5.	"Jasmine"	Khan; Scott	Bat for Lashes; Scott	2:55
6.	"Vampires"	Khan; Scott	Bat for Lashes; Scott	3:02
7.	"So Good"	Khan; Scott	Bat for Lashes; Scott	3:33
8.	"Safe Tonight"	Khan	Bat for Lashes; Scott IV; MNEK	4:16
9.	"Peach Sky"	Khan; Decilveo	Bat for Lashes; Decilveo	4:34
10.	"Mountains"	Khan	Bat for Lashes; Scott	4:31
Total length:				38:23

== Charts ==
Chart (2019)	Peak position
Australian Digital Albums (ARIA)	39
Belgian Albums (Ultratop Flanders)	47
Belgian Albums (Ultratop Wallonia)	130
Scottish Albums (Official Charts)	11
UK Albums (Official Charts)	13
US Independent Albums	14
US Current Album Sales	41
