= Toy (English band) =

English indie rock band

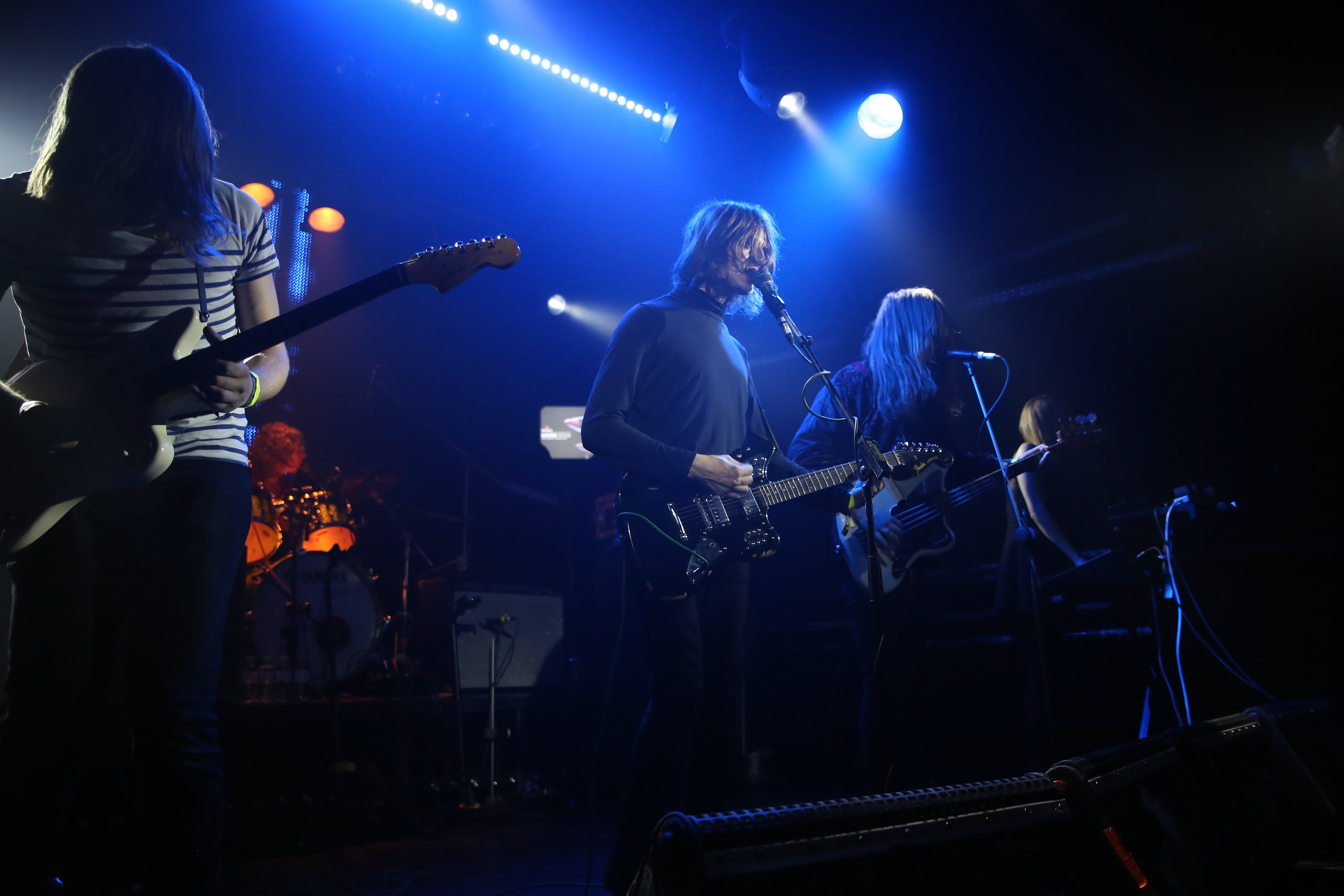
- Toy performing at Waves Vienna in 2012

Background information
- Origin: Brighton, England
- Genres: Indie rock; psychedelic rock; shoegaze
- Years active: 2010–2021
- Labels: Heavenly (2011-2018), Tough Love Records (2018-2021)
- Spinoff of: Joe Lean & The Jing Jang Jong
- Past members: Tom Dougall; Dominic O'Dair; Maxim Barron; Charlie Salvidge; Max Oscarnold; Alejandra Diez

Toy (stylised as TOY) were an English indie rock band from Brighton, East Sussex. They released five albums, an EP and a number of singles. In 2015, the band collaborated with Natasha Khan on the Sexwitch project.

== History ==
The band was formed in 2010 in Brighton by school-friends and former Joe Lean & The Jing Jang Jong band members, singer/guitarist Tom Dougall (younger brother of Rose Elinor Dougall, formerly of The Pipettes), guitarist Dominic O'Dair and bassist Maxim "Panda" Barron along with Gloucester born drummer Charlie Salvidge and Spanish keyboard player Alejandra Diez. Salvidge had previously presented "The Sixties Show" on Bristol radio station BCFM, and played with punk band Mudfite. Shortly after, the band moved to London and six months later signed to Heavenly Records.

The band's first live performance was at London venue, The Lexington, in support of The Heartbreaks in December 2010. The band played at festivals in 2011 including Field Day and supported The Horrors on their UK autumn tour. The Horrors played a big role during the band's first years, supporting and helping them, as Diez stated. The band's debut single, "Left Myself Behind", was released in 2011 by Heavenly Records, the initial pressing of 100 selling out in a day. It was reissued in January 2012. The single was described by The Guardian as "excellent...recalls some kind of late-80s/early-90s jam session between Stereolab, Felt and Pulp".

The band were picked as one of NME's "100 New Bands You Have to Hear" in January 2012, with Rhys Webb of The Horrors describing them as "the most exciting band to come out last year" and "my favourite band for 2012".

The band's debut album, Toy, was released on 10 September 2012, to critical acclaim. The album was recorded and mixed in two weeks.

The band supported the indie rock band The Vaccines on their UK Tour in May 2013, which included a date at the 20,000 capacity O2 Arena in London.

They announced the release of their second album, Join the Dots on 14 October 2013. It was released on 9 December in Europe and the UK, and the 17th in the USA.

In 2014, the band toured Europe in a nine-week trip including a lot of places outside the usual tour scheme like Ljubljana and Bratislava. At the end of April, they played their biggest show in the UK so far, the Shepherd's Bush Empire. During the summer of 2014 the band played a number of European festivals. The following year, the band continued to perform live sporadically while they continued work on their third record. At the end of August 2015 the band were part of a collaboration with Natasha Khan of Bat for Lashes and producer Dan Carey entitled Sexwitch. It consists of a six-track cover album that was recorded in day by Carey and set for release on 25 September.

Alejandra Diez announced her departure from the band via their official Facebook page on 23 September 2015, stating personal reasons. Max Oscarnold of The Proper Ornaments (who have previously supported the band on tour) has since joined the band.

In August 2016, the band announced their third album and made the song "Fast Silver" available on streaming services. It was followed by the song "I'm Still Believing" supported by a video directed by Bunny Kinney in September. The band's third album Clear Shot appeared on 28 October 2016 and was produced by David Wrench. The Guardian called the album "another fine effort from a band who are gradually building up an absorbing catalogue". The LP release included the EP "Spellbound", was followed by a tour in support in November through to December.

The band left Heavenly Records in 2018.

== Musical style ==
The band's sound has been described as a combination of psychedelic rock, krautrock, shoegaze and post-punk.

== Discography ==
=== Albums ===
- Toy (2012), UK No. 48
- Join the Dots (2013), UK No. 126
- Clear Shot (2016)
- Happy in the Hollow (2019), UK No. 71
- Songs of Consumption (2019)

=== Singles ===
- "Left Myself Behind b/w Clock Chime" (2011), Heavenly
- "Motoring b/w When I Went Back" (April 2012), Heavenly
- "Dead & Gone b/w Andrew Weatherall remix" (August 2012), Heavenly
- "Lose My Way b/w Bright White Shimmering Sun" (September 2012), Heavenly
- "Make It Mine E.P." (December 2012), Heavenly
- "Heart Skips a Beat" (March 2013), Heavenly
- "Join the Dots" (October 2013), Heavenly
- "Sequence One" (October 2018), Tough Love Records
