= The Haunted Man (album) =

Studio album by Bat for Lashes
- Released: 12 October 2012
- Recorded: 2010–2012
- Studios: DK (London) (Note: Tracks 1–6 and 8–11); Mr Dan's (London) (Note: Tracks 2, 4, 5 and 8–11); Assault & Battery 2 (London) (Note: Tracks 3, 4 and 6); Beethoven Street (London) (Note: Track 3); Wayward Sound; Abbey Road (London) (Note: Strings and horns on tracks 5, 6 and 8); The Premises (London) (Note: Track 5); Riversonic (Italy) (Note: Track 7)
- Genres: Art pop; dream pop; synth-pop
- Length: 51:28
- Label: Parlophone
- Producers: Dan Carey; Rob Ellis; Natasha Khan; David Kosten

Bat for Lashes chronology
Two Suns (2009)	The Haunted Man (2012)	The Bride (2016)

Singles from The Haunted Man
- 1. "Laura" Released: 24 July 2012; 2. "All Your Gold" Released: 19 September 2012; 3. "A Wall" Released: 18 February 2013

The Haunted Man is the third studio album by English singer and songwriter Natasha Khan, known professionally as Bat for Lashes. It was released on 12 October 2012 by Parlophone. The album was preceded by the lead single "Laura", which was released on 24 July 2012.

== Background ==
Khan stated in July 2012 that, after she returned home in March 2010 from touring in support of Two Suns (2009), she tried to rehabilitate herself to rebuild a sense of who she was without the music. In May 2010, Khan stated that although she had enough songs to put out as an album, she wanted to take more time working on new material, as she had been on tour for a long time, and found it boring to write songs about being on tour. She experienced a "profound writer's block", which led her to call Thom Yorke, lead singer of Radiohead, to ask, "What do you do when you feel like you're going to die because you can't write anything?" He advised her to draw, and subsequently Khan took life-drawing classes and a children's illustration course. Combined with intensive dance classes to boost her confidence, Khan began to feel inspiration enough to begin writing again, penning the album's opening song, "Lilies", which she said was inspired by a scene in the 1970 film Ryan's Daughter.

Khan worked on the album for two and a half years and paid for the recording sessions herself because her record label didn't see any potential singles in the first demos she showed them. She paid to go to Italy with David Kosten, Rob Ellis and a choirmaster to record the title track's choir. In August 2010, she travelled to New York to work with David Sitek, who produced a few beats that ended up on the album. He also encouraged her to continue working on it after she felt that the label was not pleased with it. She also collaborated with Beck on "Marilyn" at his Malibu house, and finished the album with Dan Carey in London.

"Laura" was one of the last songs written for the album because Khan's label pressured her into writing it, as they felt that there weren't enough potential singles on the album. They sent her to the US for her first collaboration session with Justin Parker, making it the album's (and Khan's) ever co-written song. Khan said, "I wouldn’t have done it before, but that was like a workshop in songwriting where I did actually learn a lot. It was the label’s idea – they felt I needed more ‘hits’."

The album's artwork was photographed by American photographer Ryan McGinley, and features a naked Khan carrying an equally naked man on her back. Khan told NME: "I really wanted to strip things back in honour of women like Patti Smith; just these raw, honest women. I had no make-up on, it's just me and my haunted man!"

== Singles ==
"Laura" was released as the album's lead single on 24 July 2012. The song reached number 144 on the UK Singles Chart. "All Your Gold" was released as the second single from the album on 19 September 2012, and was sent to US triple-A radio stations on 22 October. "A Wall" was released as the album's third and final single on 18 February 2013.

== Critical reception ==
Professional ratings
Aggregate scores
Source	Rating
AnyDecentMusic?	7.6/10
Metacritic	78/100
Review scores
Source	Rating
AllMusic	4/5 stars
The A.V. Club	B−
The Daily Telegraph	3/5 stars
The Guardian	4/5 stars
The Independent	3/5 stars
NME	8/10
Pitchfork	8.4/10
Q	4/5 stars
Rolling Stone	3.5/5 stars
Spin	8/10

The Haunted Man received generally positive reviews from music critics. At Metacritic, which assigns a normalised rating out of 100 to reviews from mainstream publications, the album received an average score of 78, based on 36 reviews, which indicates "generally favorable reviews". Pitchfork's Marc Hogan named The Haunted Man "one of the year's most beguiling albums", writing that it "sounds like effort magnificently realized. The rawness of feeling is achieved through equally raw ambition." Ben Hewitt of NME commented that "while The Haunted Man deals in less trinkets than its predecessor, it's not scant in splendour. Instead, for large swathes, it's like being plunged into a fairytale soundtracked by skin-prickling electro and populated by downtrodden sods hunting for breadcrumbs of comfort." Rolling Stone's Will Hermes praised the album as Khan's "sexiest, spookiest LP", stating that "the visions here seem all her own. And they're pretty awesome." Spin's Julianne Escobedo Shepherd felt that it was "strongest in its simplest moments". The Guardian critic Alexis Petridis wrote that The Haunted Man "sounds like a bold, confident album that strips away a lot of the sonic embellishments from Khan's sound", adding that "[p]erhaps it's the sound of someone who's worked out that less can sometimes be more, that not trying too hard isn't the same as not trying." Q noted a sense of clarity on the album "that comes from the sense of physical boundaries being pushed, of personal space being tested to its limits".

Heather Phares of AllMusic opined, "Focus and restraint might not sound exciting in and of themselves, but The Haunted Man is more direct than any of Bat for Lashes' previous work, and manages to keep the air of mystique around Khan that has made her one to watch and listen to since her early days." Slant Magazine's Kevin Liedel viewed that "while the album's comparatively restrained arrangements occasionally wilt in the face of Khan's fierce melodrama, The Haunted Man is still a worthy, often gorgeous entry in the Bat for Lashes canon." In a mixed review, Annie Zaleski of The A.V. Club critiqued that Khan's "moody charisma and piercing vocals ensure the album is still an enjoyable listen. All the same, it's disappointing that The Haunted Man's beauty is too often only skin deep." Despite citing the album as Khan's "strongest yet", The Observer's Kitty Empire felt that it "does not [...] deal the killer blow of originality that by now Khan should have in her power", concluding that "The Haunted Man is an assured and sonically seductive record—if only it didn't echo a little too often the sound of other women's work." Andy Gill of The Independent argued that "[t]here are moments on The Haunted Man when Natasha Khan's carefully-marshalled musical forces evoke exactly the right ambience for songs pivoting on the notion of renewal. But sometimes the recurrent mood of ecstatic affirmation of life that's evident in her singing can be short-changed by arrangements that fuss to no great purpose, dissipating their impact in brittle beats and pointless detail." Neil McCormick of The Daily Telegraph expressed that although the album "occasionally draw[s] blood", it "doesn't live up to its stripped and dangerous cover", adding, "For every song that opens up and invites you in to experience the startling wonders of [Khan's] private world, there's another that just hangs like a gauzy veil of unusual sounds and vague lyrics, not so much impenetrable as too insubstantial to be worth the effort of investigation."

=== Accolades ===
Publication	Accolade	Rank	Ref.
AllMusic	Best of 2012	44	
Beats per Minute	The Top 50 Albums of 2012	35	
Consequence of Sound	Top 50 Albums of 2012	19	
DIY	Albums of 2012	10	
Fact	The 50 Best Albums of 2012	40	
The Guardian	Best Albums of 2012	21	
musicOMH	Top 100 Albums of 2012	40	
NME	50 Best Albums of 2012	32	
Pitchfork	The Top 50 Albums of 2012	17	
Pitchfork	The 100 Best Albums of the Decade So Far (2010–2014)	92	
PopMatters	The 75 Best Albums of 2012	33	
Slant Magazine	The 25 Best Albums of 2012	4	
Spin	50 Best Albums of 2012	6	
Stereogum	Top 50 Albums of 2012	44	
Uncut	Top 75 New Albums of 2012	74	
Under the Radar	Top 100 Albums of 2012	4	
The Village Voice	Pazz & Jop	34	

== Commercial performance ==
The Haunted Man debuted at number six on the UK Albums Chart, selling 13,334 copies in its first week. The following week, it fell to number 36 with 3,991 copies sold. The album entered the Billboard 200 at number 64, becoming Khan's highest-charting album so far in the United States.

== Track listing ==
All tracks are written by Natasha Khan, except where noted.

No.	Title	Producer(s)	Length
1.	"Lilies"	Khan; David Kosten	4:45
2.	"All Your Gold"	Khan; Dan Carey; Kosten^{[a]}	4:31
3.	"Horses of the Sun"	Khan; Kosten	4:59
4.	"Oh Yeah"	Khan; Carey; Kosten^{[a]}; Rob Ellis^{[a]}	4:54
5.	"Laura" (writers: Khan, Justin Parker)	Khan; Carey; Kosten^{[a]}	4:25
6.	"Winter Fields"	Khan; Kosten	3:41
7.	"The Haunted Man"	Khan; Kosten	5:16
8.	"Marilyn"	Khan; Carey; Kosten	4:35
9.	"A Wall"	Khan; Carey; Kosten	4:00
10.	"Rest Your Head"	Khan; Carey; Kosten^{[a]}	4:03
11.	"Deep Sea Diver"	Khan; Carey; Kosten^{[a]}	6:19

iTunes Store bonus tracks
No.	Title	Length
12.	"Lumen"	2:23
13.	"Daphne"	3:24
14.	"Laura" (video)	4:30

=== Notes ===
- ^{^[a]} signifies an additional producer

== Personnel ==
Credits adapted from the liner notes of The Haunted Man.

=== Musicians ===
- Natasha Khan – vocals (all tracks); autoharp (tracks 1, 3); bass synth (tracks 1, 7, 8, 11); clarinet synth, celesta, horn synth (track 1); beat programming (tracks 1, 4, 8); glass percussion, harp (track 2); synths (tracks 2, 4, 6–11); piano (tracks 2, 7, 11); Omnichord, live cymbals, string arrangement (track 3); sampler, bass piano, bells, shaker (track 4); horn arrangement, string arrangement (track 5); drums, programming, string arrangement, woodwind arrangement (track 6); choral words (track 7); bass (track 9); string synth (tracks 9, 11); Mellotron, thumb piano, MPC programming, QY70 (track 10); harmonium (track 11)
- David Kosten – keyboards, programming (tracks 1, 3, 4, 6–11); beats (track 1); synths (tracks 3, 9); vocoder programming (track 8); vocoder (track 9); beat programming, harmonium beat (track 11)
- Dan Carey – beat programming (tracks 1, 8, 11); drum programming (tracks 2, 9–11); guitar (tracks 2, 4, 9, 10); piano, percussion (track 2); bass, programming (track 4); synths (tracks 8, 10); Omnisphere (track 9); sampler, atmospheric sounds (track 11)
- Dave Sitek – synth sound (track 1); synths (track 9)
- Finn Vine – guitar (tracks 1, 3)
- Leo Taylor – live drums (tracks 1, 9); drums (track 4)
- John Metcalfe – orchestral arrangement (track 1); sampler (tracks 1, 3); additional programming, arrangement, conducting (track 7)
- Everton Nelson – violin leader (tracks 2, 7, 8)
- Rick Koster – violin (tracks 2, 7, 8)
- Ali Dods – violin (tracks 2, 7, 8)
- Ian Humphries – violin (tracks 2, 7, 8)
- Louisa Fuller – violin (tracks 2, 7, 8)
- Jeff Moore – violin (tracks 2, 7, 8)
- Kate Robinson – violin (tracks 2, 7, 8)
- Natalia Bonner – violin (tracks 2, 7, 8)
- Bruce White – viola (tracks 2, 7, 8)
- Nick Barr – viola (tracks 2, 7, 8)
- Vicci Wardman – viola (tracks 2, 7, 8)
- Ian Burdge – cello (tracks 2, 5, 7, 8)
- Chris Worsey – cello (tracks 2, 5, 7, 8)
- Sophie Harris – cello (tracks 2, 5, 7, 8)
- Sally Herbert – arrangement (tracks 2, 7); conducting (tracks 2, 5, 7); additional arrangement (tracks 5, 7)
- Michael Spearman – drums (tracks 3, 7, 9)
- Jeremy Pritchard – bass (tracks 3, 9)
- T.J. Allen – synths (track 3)
- Adrian Utley – additional synths, guitar (track 3)
- Tim Pigott-Smith – violin (tracks 3, 6)
- Oli Langford – violin (tracks 3, 6); string arrangement (track 3); additional arrangement (track 6)
- Maximillian Baillie – viola (tracks 3, 6)
- Lucy Railton – cello (tracks 3, 6)
- Rob Ellis – marimba, drums (track 4); choral singer (track 7)
- Brendan Ashe – piano (track 4); choral singer, choral arrangement (track 7)
- Justin Parker – piano (track 5)
- Richard Watkins – French horn (tracks 5, 7, 8)
- Dan Newell – trumpet (tracks 5, 7, 8)
- Mike Kearsey – trombone (tracks 5, 7, 8)
- Oren Marshall – tuba (track 5)
- Richard Pryce – double bass (tracks 5, 7, 8)
- Steve Rossell – double bass (tracks 5, 7, 8)
- Eliza Marshall – bass flute (track 6); flute (tracks 7, 8)
- Sarah Jones – backing vocals (track 7)
- Ben Christophers – choral singer (track 7); choral sampler, piano, synths (track 8)
- Chris Vatalaro – timpani (tracks 7, 8)
- Beck Hansen – guitar, synths, beat programming, drum machine (track 8)
- Charlotte Hatherley – additional arrangement (track 8)
- Tariq Khan – synths (track 10)
- James Ford – synths, programming (track 10)

=== Technical ===
- Natasha Khan – production
- David Kosten – production (tracks 1, 3, 6–9); engineering (tracks 1, 3, 6, 7); additional production (tracks 2, 4, 5, 10, 11); additional engineering (tracks 2, 4, 5, 8–11); mixing (tracks 3, 6, 7)
- Dan Carey – mixing (tracks 1, 2, 4, 5, 8–11); mix engineering (track 1); production, engineering (tracks 2, 4, 5, 8–11)
- Alexis Smith – mix engineering (track 1); engineering (tracks 2, 4, 5, 8–11)
- Sam Okell – string recording, string engineering (tracks 2, 5, 7, 8); horn recording, horn engineering (tracks 5, 7, 8)
- Isabel Seeliger-Morley – mix engineering assistance (tracks 3, 6, 7)
- Tom Loffman – additional engineering (track 3)
- Mo Hausler – additional engineering (tracks 3, 4); engineering (tracks 6, 7)
- Drew Smith – additional engineering (track 3); engineering assistance (tracks 4, 6, 7)
- Rob Ellis – additional production (track 4); additional engineering on choral arrangement (track 7)
- Kato Ådland – additional engineering (track 4); additional engineering on choral arrangement (track 7)
- Justin Parker – vocal recording, vocal production (track 5)
- Dean Nelson – additional engineering (track 8)
- Cole Marsden – additional engineering (track 8)
- Cassidy Turbin – additional engineering (track 8)
- John Davis – mastering

=== Artwork ===
- Natasha Khan – concept, design
- Ryan McGinley – photography
- Dan Sanders – photographic commissioning
- Richard Welland – design
- Zosienka – sketches

== Charts ==
Chart performance for The Haunted Man
Chart (2012–2013)	Peak position
Australian Albums (ARIA)	21
Belgian Albums (Ultratop Flanders)	12
Belgian Albums (Ultratop Wallonia)	21
Dutch Albums (Album Top 100)	81
Finnish Albums (Suomen virallinen lista)	18
French Albums (SNEP)	31
German Albums (Offizielle Top 100)	72
Irish Albums (IRMA)	7
Italian Albums (FIMI)	74
New Zealand Albums (RMNZ)	32
Portuguese Albums (AFP)	24
Scottish Albums (Official Charts)	8
Swedish Albums (Sverigetopplistan)	53
Swiss Albums (Schweizer Hitparade)	29
UK Albums (Official Charts)	6
US Billboard 200	64
US Top Alternative Albums (Billboard)	13
US Top Rock Albums (Billboard)	21

== Certifications and sales ==
Certifications and sales for The Haunted Man
Region	Certification	Certified units/sales
France	—	5,000
United Kingdom (BPI)	Silver	60,000^{*}
United States	—	9,163
^{*} Sales figures based on certification alone.

== Release history ==
Release history for The Haunted Man
Region	Date	Label	Ref.
Australia	12 October 2012	EMI	
Germany	12 October 2012	EMI	
Ireland	12 October 2012	Parlophone	
United Kingdom	15 October 2012	Parlophone	
France	15 October 2012	EMI	
Italy	16 October 2012	EMI	
United States	23 October 2012	Capitol	
Poland	29 October 2012	EMI	
