= Ben Christophers =

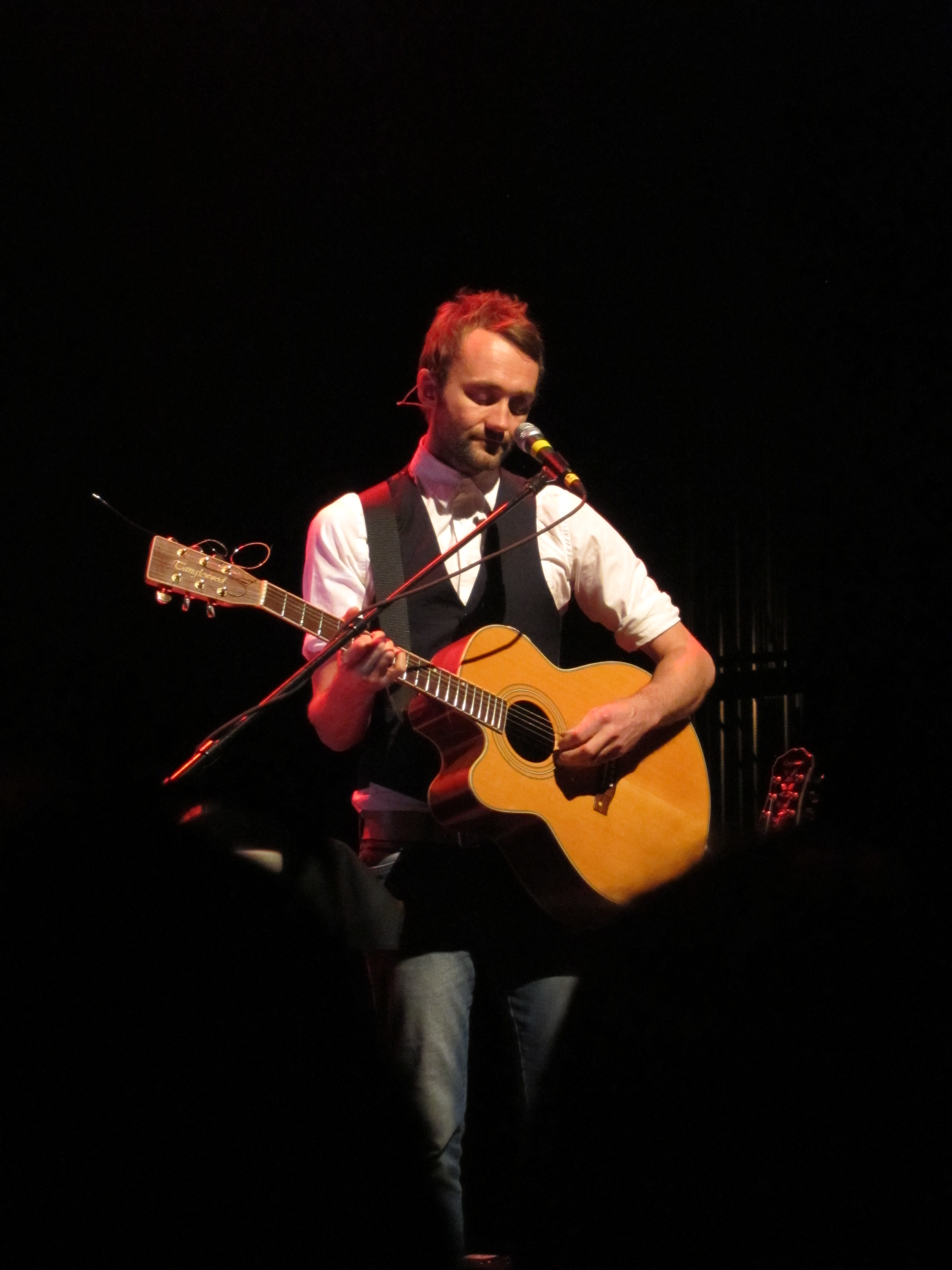
- Ben Christophers performs live at the Fillmore Miami Beach in June 2010

Background information
- Born: Benjamin John Christophers; 1969 (age 56–57)
- Origin: Wolverhampton, West Midlands, England
- Genres: Folktronica, alternative rock, ambient
- Occupations: Singer-songwriter, multi instrumentalist, record producer
- Instruments: Vocals, guitar, piano, synthesizer
- Labels: V2, Cooking Vinyl, Rocketeer

Ben Christophers (born Benjamin John; 1969 in Wolverhampton, England) is an English singer-songwriter, multi-instrumentalist, and record producer. He has released five solo albums: My Beautiful Demon (1999), Spoonface (2001), The Spaces in Between (2004), Viewfinder (2005), and Ben Christophers (2010).

Christophers was signed to V2 Records early in his career. He is known for blending atmospheric folktronica and alternative rock elements in his music, and his style has drawn comparisons to artists such as Jeff Buckley, Thom Yorke, and Mark Hollis. yet his fingerprint remains unmistakable.

He has collaborated extensively with Natasha Khan (known as Bat for Lashes), co-producing her Mercury Prize–nominated album The Bride (2016) and co-producing the track "Dream of Delphi" on her latest album of the same name.

As a producer, Christophers also Produced Nakhane’s album You Will Not Die, which was included in The New York Times list of "10 Artists to Watch in 2019". He also produced albums for Peter Alexander Jobson and Zoe Graham. Other production credits include the songs "New Brighton" by Nakhane (featuring Anohni) and "Mon Capitaine" by Baptiste W. Hamon (featuring Will Oldham).

Christophers has worked with several other artists, including Anna Calvi, Guy Garvey, Marianne Faithfull, Gia Ford, Crimer, Lala Hayden, Imogen and the Knife, Alma Forrer, Eliza Shaddad, Vök, and Cold Specks.

He has also written for and performed with french pop royalty the late French singer Françoise Hardy, contributing to her albums Tant de belles choses (2004) and Parenthèses (2006).

Christophers has toured internationally with artists such as Tori Amos, Coldplay, Radiohead, and Depeche Mode. He has appeared on television programs including Later... with Jools Holland and the Late Show with David Letterman.

== Discography ==
- My Beautiful Demon (1999)
- Spoonface (2001)
- The Spaces in Between (2004)
- Viewfinder (2005)
- Ben Christophers (2010)
