= Bat for Lashes =

English musician (born 1979)

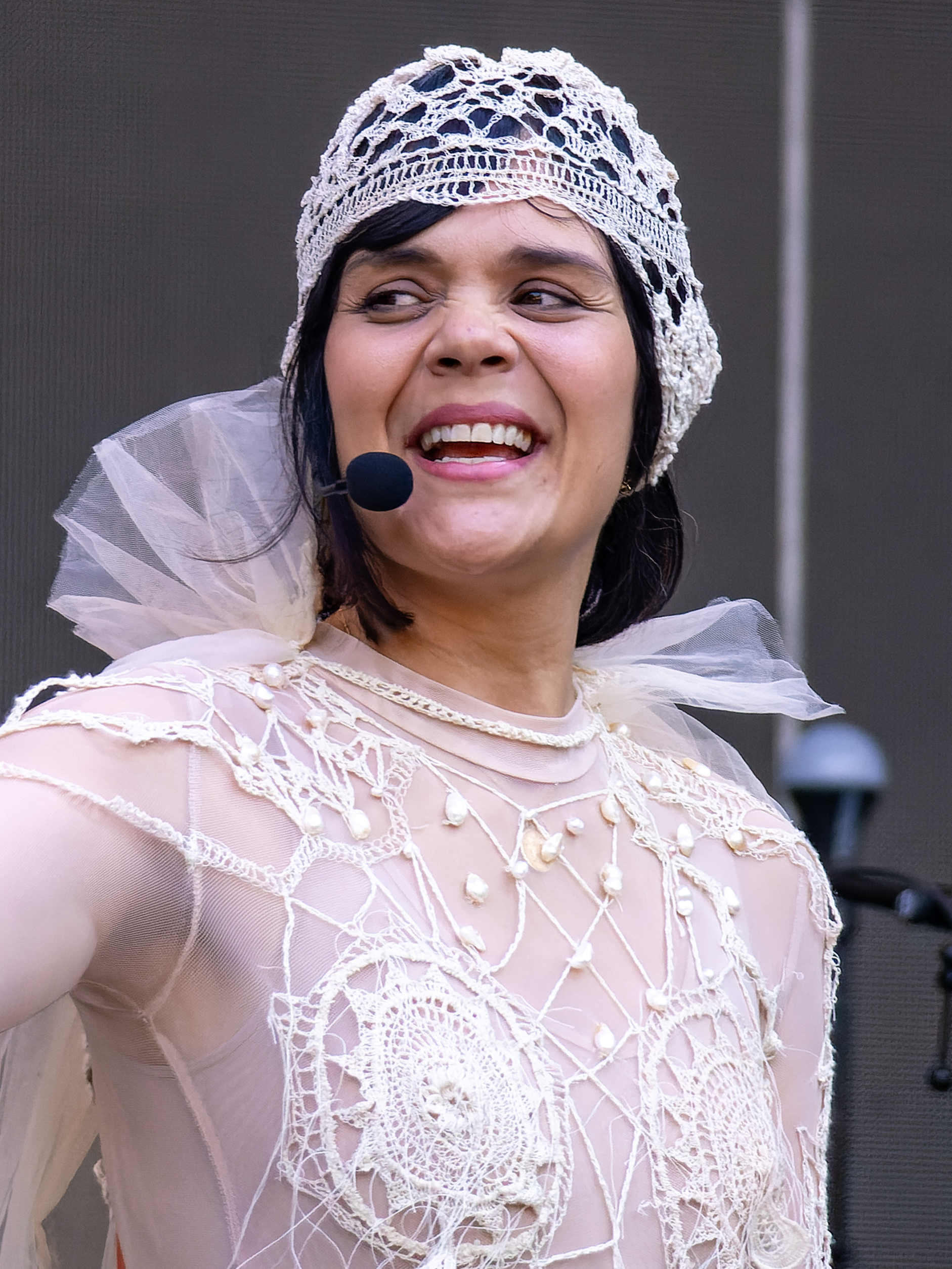
- Bat for Lashes performing in 2023

Background information
- Born: Natasha Khan; 25 October 1979 (age 47); London, England
- Genres: Indie pop; dream pop; baroque pop; art pop; folktronica; synth-pop
- Occupations: Singer; songwriter; multi-instrumentalist
- Instruments: Vocals; piano; guitar; bass; harmonium; drums; autoharp; synthesiser; vibraphone; keyboards
- Years active: 2006–present
- Labels: Echo; Parlophone; Manimal Vinyl; Caroline; Astralwerks; Capitol; Mercury KX
- Member of: Sexwitch
- Website: www.batforlashes.com

Natasha Khan (born 25 October 1979), known professionally as Bat for Lashes, is an English singer, songwriter, producer, and multi-instrumentalist. She has released six studio albums: Fur and Gold (2006), Two Suns (2009), The Haunted Man (2012), The Bride (2016), Lost Girls (2019), and The Dream of Delphi (2024). She has received three Mercury Prize nominations. Khan is also the vocalist for Sexwitch, a collaboration with the rock band Toy and producer Dan Carey.

== Early life ==
Khan was born on 25 October 1979, to an English mother and a Pakistani father, squash player Rehmat Khan. A member of the Khan family, she is the granddaughter of squash player Nasrullah Khan, the niece of squash players Jahangir Khan and Torsam Khan, and the stepdaughter of singer and actress Salma Agha.

The family moved to Rickmansworth, Hertfordshire, when Khan was five years old. She attended many of her family's squash matches, which she felt inspired her creativity: "The roar of the crowd is intense; it is ceremonial, ritualistic, I feel like the banner got passed to me but I carried it on in a creative way. It is a similar thing, the need to thrive on heightened communal experience." After her father left the family when Khan was eleven, she taught herself to play the piano, which became "a channel to express things, to get them out".

Khan was subject to racial abuse during secondary school due to her Pakistani heritage. She played truant and was suspended after swearing and throwing a chair at a teacher. She told The Daily Telegraph: "I was an outsider at school. When I came back from being suspended they had told the small group of friends that I did have there that they weren't allowed to talk to me because I was a really bad influence. Then it got quite lonely." After completing her GCSEs and A-Levels, Khan took a job in a card-packing factory where she would work while listening to songs she had made. She said: "My internal imaginary life was really fruitful at that time ... All day long just listening and dreaming, while counting the cards to be packed." With money saved from the job, she embarked on a three-month road trip through the United States and Mexico.

After returning to the UK, Khan settled in Brighton in 2000 to study music and visual arts at the University of Brighton, where she produced sound installations, animations, and performances influenced by artists including Steve Reich and Susan Hiller. After finishing her degree, Khan completed an NVQ in play work and childcare, and worked as a nursery school teacher, dedicating her spare time to developing songs, recording demos, and gigging in Brighton. She has said the name Bat for Lashes "doesn't really mean anything [...] It conjured up Halloween-y images, and it sounded metal and feminine."

== Music career ==
=== 2006–2008: Fur and Gold ===
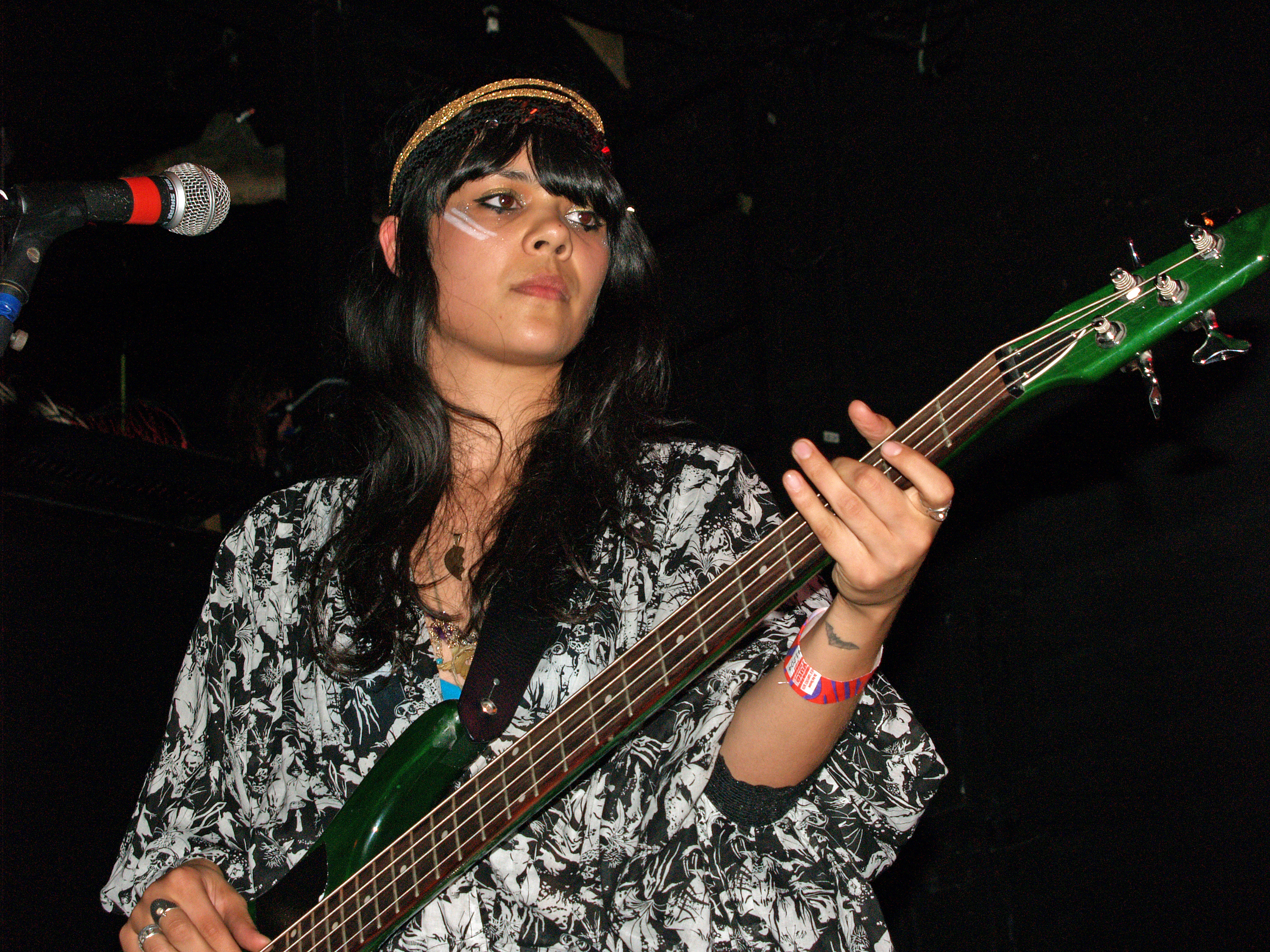
Khan playing New York City's Bowery Ballroom in 2007, promoting Fur and Gold

Khan's debut single, "The Wizard", was released digitally through Drowned in Sound records and on 7" vinyl through Khan's own imprint, She Bear Records. In 2006, she signed to Echo, a record label owned by independent publisher Chrysalis Music that acted as an incubator for artists before "upstreaming" them to major labels. Echo released her debut album, Fur and Gold, in September 2006. In 2007, Bat for Lashes and Echo signed an international licensing deal with Parlophone Records, which re-released Fur and Gold the same year. A limited vinyl version was released by Los Angeles indie label Manimal Vinyl in May 2007. Fur and Gold reached number forty-eight on the UK Albums Chart and has since been certified gold by the BPI for sales exceeding 100,000 copies. In 2007, Khan appeared at the Glastonbury Festival and toured the United States.

Fur and Gold received critical acclaim, including a five-star review from The Guardian. It was shortlisted for the 2007 Mercury Prize, losing out to Klaxons' Myths of the Near Future, despite being a favourite of British media to win the award. Also in 2007, the American Society of Composers, Authors and Publishers (ASCAP) bestowed their Vanguard Award on her and chose her to perform at their "ASCAP Presents..." showcase at South by Southwest in Austin, Texas. In 2008, Khan was nominated for British Breakthrough Act and British Female Solo Artist at the Brit Awards.

Radiohead's 2008 tour featured several shows with Bat for Lashes as their opening act. Her version of the Cure's "A Forest" appeared on a charity album called Perfect as Cats on Manimal Vinyl in late 2008.

=== 2009–2011: Two Suns ===
Khan's second album, Two Suns, was released in April 2009 and produced by Khan and David Kosten. In preparation for the album, Khan journeyed to Joshua Tree Desert in California to gain inspiration, before returning to New York and London to write and record the finished material for release.

A concept album, Two Suns focuses on Khan's desert-born alter ego Pearl, whose personality she adopted while staying in New York to gain a better understanding of the character. She said in an interview with the BBC's Newsbeat, "I really just did it as an experiment of dressing up myself with quite garish extreme feminine make-up. I wanted to photograph myself in that situation and just see what it made me feel." Khan believed that living in Brooklyn when bands such as TV on the Radio, MGMT, and Gang Gang Dance were emerging on the music scene had an influence on the album's musical style. In an interview with MTV, she said, "I experienced that whole thing coming out, in terms of beats and like going out dancing and checking out all this new music, it was really inspiring." During the album's production, she also collaborated with Brooklyn band Yeasayer for the bass and beat programming. In June 2009, Bat for Lashes first appeared on the cover of The Fader, in its 60th issue.

Two Suns debuted at number five on the UK Albums Chart, and has been certified gold by the BPI for sales of 100,000 copies. The first single from the album, "Daniel", became Khan's first hit, peaking at number thirty-six on the UK Singles Chart; it later won the Ivor Novello Award for Best Contemporary Song and was nominated for the MTV Video Music Award for Breakthrough Video of the Year. The following singles were "Pearl's Dream" and a double A-side of "Sleep Alone" and "Moon and Moon", the latter of which was featured in a high-profile advertising campaign for children's charity Barnardo's in late 2009.

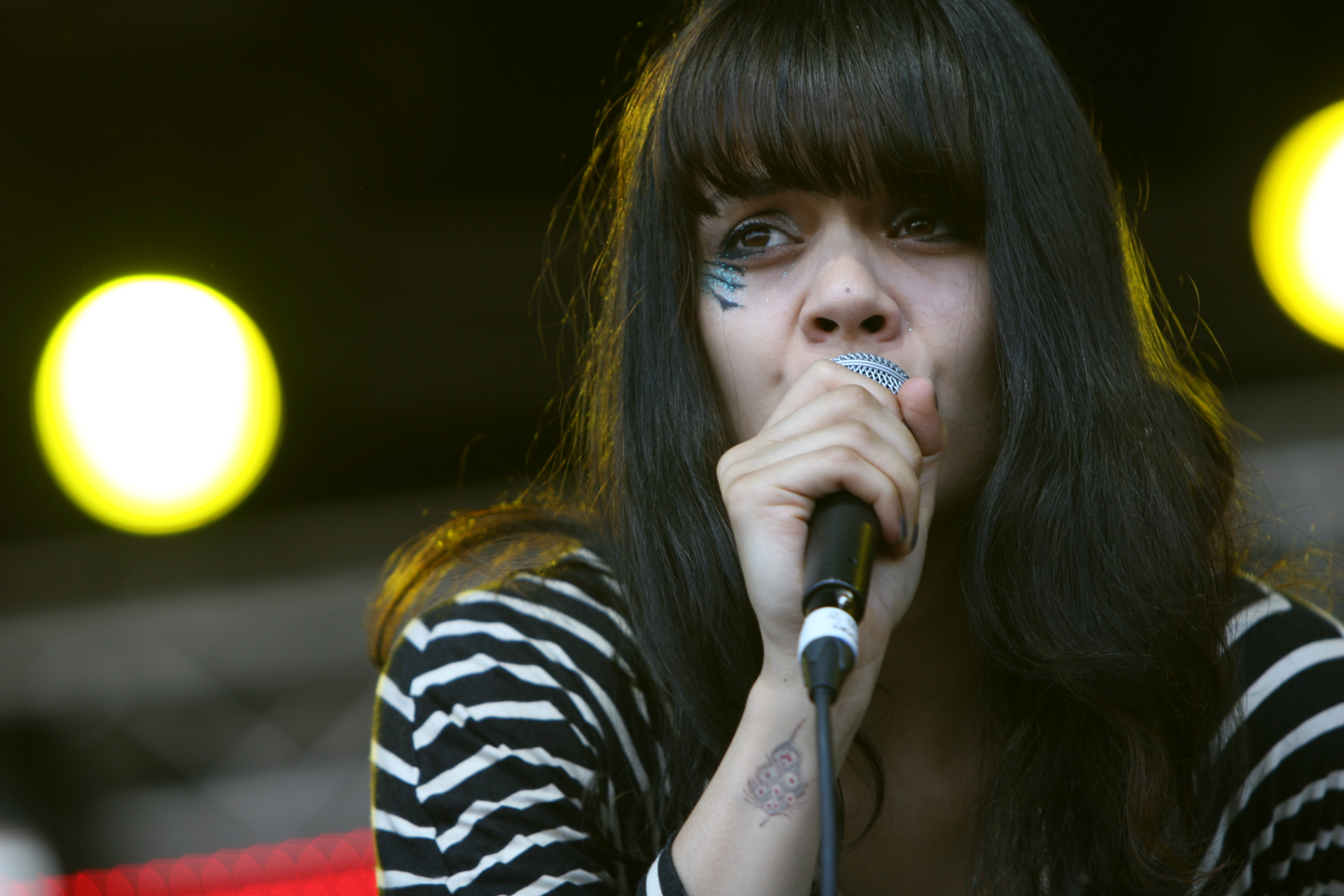
Bat for Lashes at the Primavera Sound, 2009

Critical response to the album was mostly favourable, generating a score of 77 on the review aggregator Metacritic. In their review for Two Suns, NME awarded it 8 out of 10, describing the album as "epic in scope and ambition and requires a similarly epic patience to unravel its charms." Rolling Stone also rated it favourably, stating "Khan proves she's a powerhouse under her billowy sleeves. She could be the next Kate Bush." However, some critics such as PopMatters found problems: reviewing the album, they wrote, "While the weaker songs are definitely not throwaways, they miss the mark in more than one way." Blender magazine also felt the album was average, awarding it 3 out 5 stars, saying, "The contrast between Pearl and Natasha isn't always crisply drawn". As with Fur and Gold, Khan was nominated for the Mercury Prize for Two Suns. In 2010, she won Best Alternative Act at the UK Asian Music Awards and received a second BRIT Award nomination for British Female Solo Artist.

As part of the 2009 summer festival season, Khan played at Glastonbury, Somerset House, and the iTunes Festival. In September 2009, a special edition of Two Suns was released in the United Kingdom ahead of Khan's October tour. The special edition, which included a cover version of the Kings of Leon single "Use Somebody", was released simultaneously in the United States. Later in 2009, the cover artwork for Two Suns was nominated for Best Art Vinyl.

In early 2010, Khan toured South America supporting Coldplay after a gig at The De La Warr Pavilion, including playing covers of Radiohead's "All I Need" and the Cure's "Lullaby". In 2010, she collaborated with Beck on the track "Let's Get Lost" for the Twilight Saga: Eclipse soundtrack, and contributed the song "Sleep Alone" from Two Suns to the Enough Project and Downtown Records' Raise Hope for Congo compilation. Proceeds from the compilation funded efforts to make the protection and empowerment of Congo's women a priority, as well as to inspire individuals around the world to raise their voice for peace in Congo.

For Record Store Day 2010, Bat for Lashes released an exclusive double A-side 7" single comprising a live performance of the "Trophy" single B-side "Howl", recorded at De La Warr Pavilion, and a cover of "Wild Is the Wind", originally written by Dimitri Tiomkin and Ned Washington. In 2011, Khan recorded a cover version of Depeche Mode's "Strangelove" for a Gucci advertising campaign. The song was released as a free download from Gucci's YouTube channel and various blogs. In June 2011, Khan performed two shows at the Sydney Opera House as part of the Vivid LIVE Arts Festival, her only performances of the year.

=== 2012–2014: The Haunted Man ===
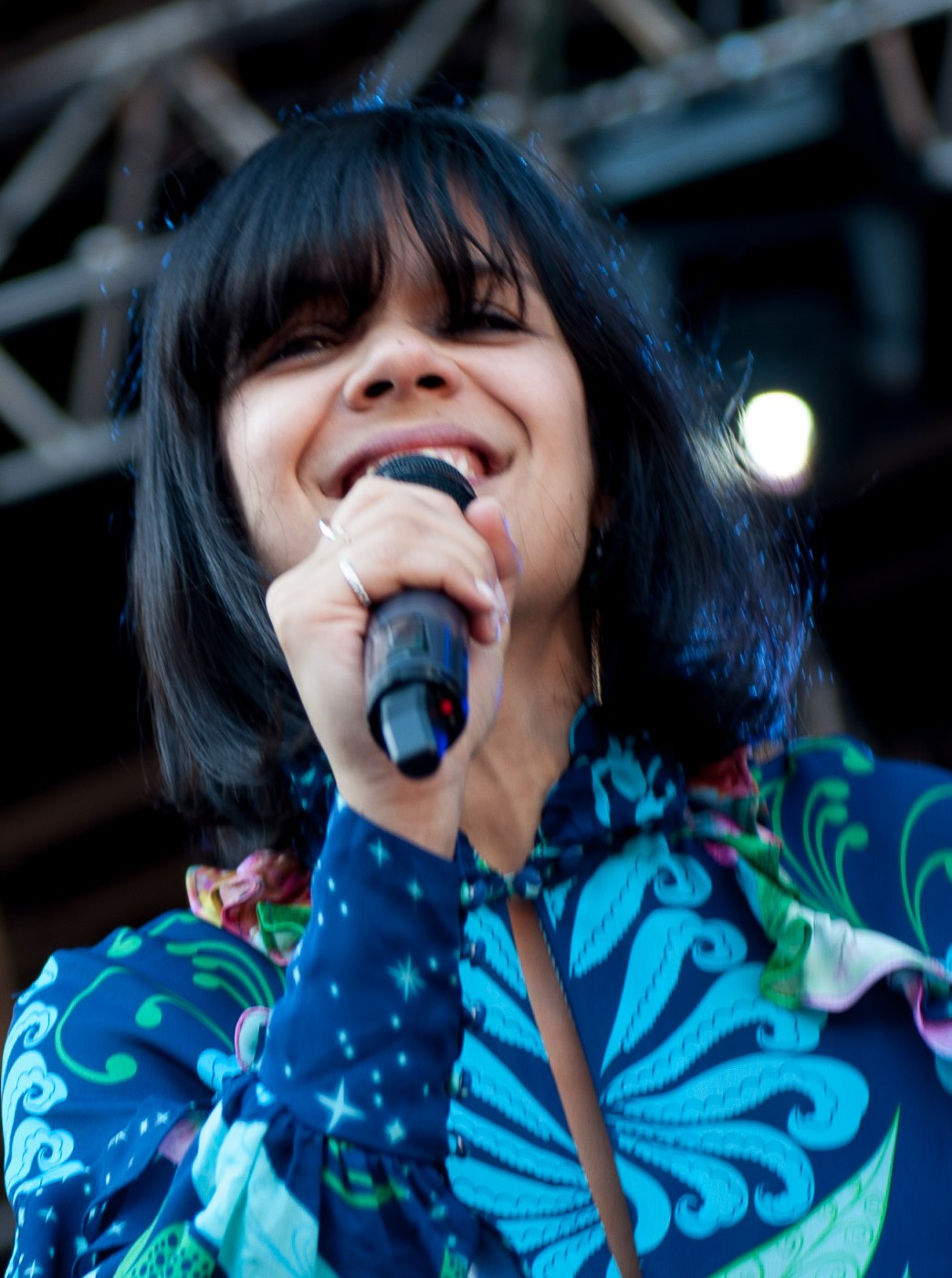
Bat for Lashes at Way out West 2013 in Gothenburg, Sweden

The third Bat for Lashes album, The Haunted Man, was released in October 2012 in the UK. The lead single, "Laura", was released in July; the second single, "All Your Gold", came out in September. The Haunted Man debuted at number six on the UK Albums Chart, Khan's second consecutive top-ten album, and has since been certified Silver by the BPI for selling 60,000 copies. Subsequent singles were "A Wall" and "Lilies". Khan attended the 2013 Brit Awards, having been nominated in the Best British Female category, and was also nominated at the Ivor Novello Awards in the category of Best Song Musically and Lyrically (for "Laura").

In 2013, Khan performed at the Coachella Valley Music and Arts Festival, supported Blur at the Irish Museum of Modern Art in Dublin, Ireland, and opened for Depeche Mode on the first half of their North American tour. In June, she released a cover of "The Bride", a pre-revolution Iranian song, with the rock band Toy. On 2 September 2013, Khan premiered the track "Garden's Heart", a collaboration with Jon Hopkins for the soundtrack to the film How I Live Now.

In 2014, Khan collaborated with Damon Albarn on a track for his 2014 solo album Everyday Robots, premiered "Skin Song" from Body of Songs—a compilation album featuring songs inspired by anatomy and medical science—and contributed a cover of "Plan the Escape" by Son Lux to the soundtrack album of the film The Hunger Games: Mockingjay – Part 1.

=== 2015: Sexwitch ===
On 15 August 2015, Khan began previewing new music on her Twitter and Instagram pages via a game of Hangman. During a surprise Green Man Festival set in Wales on 22 August, she debuted a music project with producer Dan Carey and the band Toy, called Sexwitch. Two days later, it was announced that Sexwitch's eponymous debut album would be released on 25 September 2015 by Echo and BMG, consisting of six covers of 1970s psychedelic and folk songs from different parts of the world.

=== 2016: The Bride ===
On 19 February 2016, a new song, "I Do", was released on YouTube with a picture of a wedding invitation reading "Save The Date 1st July 2016". The track was made available for purchase the same day. On 11 March, Khan released "In God's House", the lead single from her fourth studio album, The Bride, which was released on 1 July and later nominated for the 2016 Mercury Music Prize.

=== 2019: Lost Girls ===
On 10 June 2019, the album Lost Girls was announced and the song "Kids in the Dark" was released on YouTube. Lost Girls was released on 6 September 2019.

=== 2024: The Dream of Delphi ===
Khan released the title track from her sixth album, The Dream of Delphi, on 22 February 2024. The album was released on 31 May 2024, and an English tour followed in June. The album reflects on the conception and birth of Khan's daughter, Delphi, during the 2020 COVID-19 pandemic.

== Artistry ==
Khan is a contralto with an expansive range. Critics have likened her music to the work of Joni Mitchell, Nico, Siouxsie Sioux, Björk, Kate Bush, Cat Power, PJ Harvey, Annie Lennox, Tori Amos, and Fiona Apple. Her music has been described by MTV Iggy as "at once haunting and way danceable".

== Other projects ==
Khan and fashion house YMC designed a limited edition capsule collection of sportswear and accessories for the spring/summer 2014 season. The release of the collection was accompanied by a fashion film, Under the Indigo Moon, directed by and starring Khan, with a soundtrack she composed with Beck.

In 2014, Film4 commissioned Cowboy Films to produce the short film Gotcha, with Khan as writer and director. She said she intended to develop the project into a feature-length film. In 2016, she wrote and directed one segment ("I Do") of the anthology film Madly. Khan has written feature-length film scripts for The Bride (2016) and Lost Girls (2019).

== Personal life ==
Khan moved from London to Los Angeles in 2017. She and her partner, Australian actor and model Samuel Watkins, live in Highland Park. Khan gave birth to their first child, a daughter, in July 2020.

== Discography ==
- Fur and Gold (2006)
- Two Suns (2009)
- The Haunted Man (2012)
- The Bride (2016)
- Lost Girls (2019)
- The Dream of Delphi (2024)

== Awards and nominations ==
Year	Award	Category	Result
2007	Mercury Prize	Fur and Gold	Nominated
2007	ASCAP Awards	Vanguard Award	Won
2007	Antville Music Video Awards	Video of the Year ("What's a Girl to Do?")	Won
2007	Antville Music Video Awards	Best Choreography ("What's a Girl to Do?")	Nominated
2007	Antville Music Video Awards	Best Art Direction ("What's a Girl to Do?")	Nominated
2007	MTV Europe Music Awards	Best Video ("What's a Girl to Do?")	Nominated
2008	UK Music Video Awards	Best Indie/Alternative Video ("What's a Girl to Do?")	Nominated
2008	D&AD Awards	Music Video ("What's a Girl to Do?")	Wood Pencil
2008	Brit Awards	British Breakthrough Act	Nominated
2008	Brit Awards	British Female Solo Artist	Nominated
2008	PLUG Independent Music Awards	New Artist of the Year	Nominated
2008	PLUG Independent Music Awards	Female Artist of the Year	Nominated
2009	Mercury Prize	Two Suns	Nominated
2009	MTV Video Music Awards	Breakthrough Video ("Daniel")	Nominated
2009	Best Art Vinyl of 2009	Two Suns	Nominated
2009	Rober Awards Music Poll	Best Female Artist	Nominated
2009	Virgin Media Music Awards	Best Track ("Daniel")	Nominated
2010	Brit Awards	British Female Solo Artist	Nominated
2010	UK Asian Music Awards	Best Alternative Act	Won
2010	Ivor Novello Awards	Best Contemporary Song ("Daniel")	Won
2010	Music Producers Guild Awards	UK Single of the Year ("Daniel")	Nominated
2012	Antville Music Video Awards	Best Performance ("Laura")	Nominated
2013	Brit Awards	British Female Solo Artist	Nominated
2013	Virgin Media	Best Album of 2012 (The Haunted Man)	Nominated
2013	Ivor Novello Awards	Best Song Musically and Lyrically ("Laura")	Nominated
2013	YouTube Music Awards	Innovation of the Year ("Lilies")	Nominated
2016	Mercury Prize	The Bride	Nominated
2019	Ivor Novello Awards	Best Television Soundtrack (Requiem)	Won
2020	Denmark GAFFA Awards	Best Foreign Solo Act	Pending
2020	Denmark GAFFA Awards	Best Foreign Album (Lost Girls)	Pending
