= Faultline (musician) =

British record producer

- Also known as: Faultline
- Born: David Jeremy Kosten
- Origin: North London, United Kingdom
- Genres: Electronica; IDM
- Labels: Leaf; Tiny Consumer
- Website: faultline.co.uk

David Jeremy Kosten, better known by his stage name Faultline, is a British DJ and producer.

== Career ==
He has produced the largely instrumental debut Closer, Colder and the follow-up Your Love Means Everything, which featured guest vocals from Coldplay's Chris Martin, The Flaming Lips, and R.E.M's Michael Stipe.

Kosten has produced albums for other artists, notably gaining recognition with Bat for Lashes (double Mercury Music Prize nominated and Ivor Novello winning Two Suns and Fur and Gold, and 2012 album The Haunted Man), and Everything Everything (Mercury Music Prize and Ivor Novello nominated Man Alive and 2013 album Arc).

Kosten co-produced with Marina Diamandis on her third studio album Froot.

== Background ==
=== Early years ===
In his youth, Kosten burst his lung while playing clarinet for the National Youth Orchestra. A London-based art school drop-out, Kosten spent the better part of his twenties in his home studio, teaching himself recording and production techniques and exploring far-flung combinations of sound. Faultline's debut single, "Control", was built around death threats left on Kosten's answering machine. It transpired that the intimidating messages had been left by a singer with whom Kosten had refused a collaboration. Kosten appropriated the messages, applying the threats alongside wayward noise, rhythms and Steve Reich-inspired neo-classical music.

=== Closer Colder ===
On his debut album, Closer Colder, released via the Leaf Label in 1999, Kosten continued this approach to music making, using samples in place of vocals. Most notably, the album's title track used Dennis Hopper's voice from Blue Velvet. Kosten is reported to have obtained permission to use the sample directly from Hopper and David Lynch.

Closer, Colder showcased Kosten's arranging abilities, and was received positively by publications:

- The Times 25/9/99 "...an album so supremely modernist that it approaches the classical...Closer, Colder can both stir deep emotion and chill to the bone. The sweetest cello, trumpet and violin resonate against a background of abrasive electronica...emotional and sonic disjunction are rarely as eloquently expressed as this".
- DJ 10/99 "...a quite breathtaking, visionary album that promises to take listeners to places they've never been before....one of the finest experimental albums this year."
- Q 11/99 "...Closer, Colder brims with invention...An accomplished, intriguing, distinctly Lynchian debut."
- Esquire Magazine top 10 album of the year.

=== Your Love Means Everything ===
Released three years later, Your Love Means Everything was an continued Kosten's sonic experimentation.

The album, originally released on Rough Trade owner Geoff Travis's Blanco Y Negro imprint in 2002, fell prey to label politics, but re-released by EMI/Capitol in 2004; it received high praise:

- “Faultline's heady combination of electronic avant-garde classical/dance is, thematically, about complicated as it sounds but Kosten's vision translates, aurally, as a series of threadbare, hauntingly programmed compositions, each simplistic and engrossing”. – Pitchfork
- "Exquisitely moving" - Mojo
- "Devastating and compelling" - The Sunday Times
- "A must-hear record...12 songs of heart-shattering sadness" – NME

On Your Love Means Everything, the Faultline attitude to "voices" was inverted, with vocal contributions from Coldplay's Chris Martin, Jacob Golden, the Flaming Lips's Wayne Coyne and Steven Drozd, Cannibal Ox and R.E.M.'s Michael Stipe.

The Flaming Lips were just outgrowing their cult status when they collaborated on "The Colossal Gray Sunshine". With gentle, hypnotic beats that kaleidoscope into multicoloured, atmospheric sounds, the tone of "Your Love Means Everything" can be summed up with this track. With its cinematic, nightmarish feel, the song serves as the lynchpin of the album, which Rolling Stone called "a masterpiece of widescreen psychedelic soft rock."

R.E.M.'s Michael Stipe collaborated on a cover of "Greenfields", a piece of dark Americana from late-50s folk revivalists The Brothers Four. (Kosten expressed incredulity about recording this, his favourite childhood song, with the R.E.M. singer).

"We Came from Lego Blocks" is a fractured, downbeat lullaby featuring vocals from Vordul Megilah of East Coast underground hip-hop duo Cannibal Ox.

Singer songwriter Joseph Arthur collaborated on a cover of The Rolling Stones's "Wild Horses", while "Biting Tongues" featured Ras B, a ragga-styled MC from Adrian Sherwood's On U-Sound crew.

Other album tracks like "Your Love Means Everything", "Theme for Half Speed" and "I Only Know Myself" showcase Faultline's ghostly, sublime and orchestral sound.

== Discography ==
=== Albums ===
- Closer Colder (27 September 1999)
  1. "Awake" – 4:52
  2. "Tiny Consumer" – 5:27
  3. "Mute" – 8:51
  4. "Papercut" – 4:03
  5. "Control" – 3:21
  6. "Closer Colder" – 5:40
  7. "Salt" – 4:44
  8. "Partyline Honey" – 5:11
  9. (Untitled) – 6:41
- Your Love Means Everything (10 September 2002)
  1. "Your Love Means Everything" – 3:41
  2. "Where is My Boy?" (featuring Chris Martin) – 5:34
  3. "Sweet Iris" – 3:49
  4. "Bitter Kiss" (featuring Jacob Golden) – 3:23
  5. "Waiting for the Green Light" (featuring Cannibal Ox) – 4:09
  6. "The Colossal Gray Sunshine" (featuring The Flaming Lips) – 2:44
  7. "Clocks" – 4:18
  8. "Theme for Half Speed" – 3:13
  9. "Greenfields" (featuring Michael Stipe) – 3:19
  10. "Lost Broadcast" (featuring Nick McCabe) – 3:38
  11. "I Only Know Myself" – 3:52
  12. "Your Love Means Everything Part 2" (featuring Chris Martin) – 4:03
- Your Love Means Everything (re-issue on Capitol/EMI) (17 May 2004)
  1. "Your Love Means Everything" – 3:41
  2. "Where is My Boy?" (featuring Chris Martin) – 5:34
  3. "We Came from Lego Blocks" (featuring Vordul Megilah) – 2:45
  4. "Theme for Half Speed" – 3:13
  5. "Wild Horses" (featuring Joseph Arthur) – 5:13
  6. "Sweet Iris" – 3:49
  7. "Biting Tongues" (featuring Ras B) – 3:28
  8. "Clocks" – 4:18
  9. "The Colossal Gray Sunshine" (featuring The Flaming Lips) – 2:44
  10. "I Only Know Myself" – 3:52
  11. "Greenfields" (featuring Michael Stipe) – 3:19
  12. "Lost Broadcast" (featuring Nick McCabe) – 3:38
  13. "Your Love Means Everything Part 2" (featuring Chris Martin) – 4:03
  14. "Missing" (Japanese bonus track) – 3:25
  15. "Surfacenothing" (Japanese bonus track) – 5:00

=== Singles and EPs ===
- Papercut EP (1998)
  1. "Papercut" – 4:03
  2. "Partyline Honey" (Remix) – 4:45
  3. "Quarantine" – 3:26
  4. "Not Forgotten" – 7:06
- "Mute" single (1999)
  1. "Mute" – 8:52
  2. "Mute" (Third Eye Foundation Remix) – 6:33
  3. "Dislocate" – 2:37
- Faultline EP (2002)
  1. "The Colossal Gray Sunshine" (featuring The Flaming Lips) – 2:44
  2. "Missing" – 3:25
  3. "Surfacenothing" – 5:00
- "Biting Tongues" promo single (May 2004)
  1. "Biting Tongues" (featuring Ras B) – 3:32
  2. "Biting Tongues" (The Bug Mix) – 4:09
  3. "Biting Tongues" (Riton Mix) – 6:17
  4. "Biting Tongues" (Hot Chip Mix) – 7:07
- "Wild Horses"/"Biting Tongues" double A-side single (10 May 2004)
  1. "Wild Horses" (featuring Joseph Arthur) – 5:13
  2. "Biting Tongues" (featuring Ras B) – 3:32
  3. "Biting Tongues" (Riton Mix) – 6:17
  4. "Wild Horses" (enhanced video)
  5. "Biting Tongues" (enhanced video)
- "The Colossal Gray Sunshine" promo single (August 2004)
  1. "The Colossal Gray Sunshine" (featuring The Flaming Lips) (remix) – 2:47
- "Send In The Clowns" single (2017)
  1. "Send In The Clowns" featuring Lisa Hannigan on vocal for an Audi car TV commercial - 4.51
