= 20 Years: The Greatest Hits =

Greatest hits album by Will Young
- Released: 27 May 2022
- Recorded: 2002–2022
- Label: Sony Music

Will Young chronology
| Crying on the Bathroom Floor (2021) | 20 Years: The Greatest Hits (2022) | Light It Up (2024) |

Singles from 20 Years: The Greatest Hits
- 1. "Why Does It Hurt" Released: 15 April 2022

20 Years: The Greatest Hits is the third greatest hits album by English singer Will Young, released on 27 May 2022. The album commemorates two decades since Young's Pop Idol win. The album contains the majority of Young's biggest hits, but excludes several singles from his career.

== Promotion ==
On 15 April 2022, Young released the single "Why Does It Hurt", which preceded the album's release. The single debuted and peaked at number 87 on the UK Singles Downloads Chart Top 100. Young performed the track as part of the setlist for his tour to accompany the album.

== Chart performance ==
20 Years: The Greatest Hits charted at number 6 on the UK Albums Chart and stayed on the chart for one week; it debuted at number 5 on the UK Album Sales Chart. Additionally, the album charted for seven weeks on the UK Physical Albums Chart.

== Track listing ==
20 Years: The Greatest Hits – Disc one
| No. | Title | Writer(s) | Album | Length |
|---|---|---|---|---|
| 1. | "Evergreen" | Jörgen Elofsson; David Kreuger; Per Magnusson | From Now On (2002) | 4:11 |
| 2. | "Light My Fire" (Radio Edit) | Jim Morrison; Robby Krieger | From Now On | 3:35 |
| 3. | "The Long and Winding Road" (with Gareth Gates) | John Lennon; Paul McCartney | From Now On | 3:28 |
| 4. | "You and I" | Edward Johnson; Henry Johnson; Mike Peden | From Now On | 4:04 |
| 5. | "Leave Right Now" | Francis White | Friday's Child (2003) | 3:32 |
| 6. | "Your Game" | Will Young; Jacob Cruz; Blair MacKichan | Friday's Child | 4:08 |
| 7. | "Friday's Child" (Single Version) | Dina Taylor; Stephen Lee | Friday's Child | 4:09 |
| 8. | "All Time Love" | Jamie Hartman | Keep On (2005) | 3:48 |
| 9. | "Who Am I" | Lucie Silvas; White | Keep On | 4:28 |
| 10. | "Changes" | Young; White | Let It Go (2008) | 3:58 |
| 11. | "Grace" (Radio Edit) | Young; Matthew Prime | Let It Go | 3:32 |
| 12. | "Jealousy" | Young; Mima Stilwell; Jim Eliot | Echoes (2011) | 4:07 |
| 13. | "Come On" | Stilwell; Eliot | Echoes | 3:12 |
| 14. | "Losing Myself" | Young; Pascal Gabriel | Echoes | 4:00 |
| 15. | "Love Revolution" | Young; Stilwell; Eliot; Ivan Matias; Andrea Martin; Edmund Clement; Robert Borrmann | 85% Proof (2015) | 3:00 |
| 16. | "Joy" | Young; Stilwell; Eliot | 85% Proof | 3:29 |
| 17. | "All the Songs" | Young; Stilwell; Eliot | Lexicon (2019) | 3:53 |
| 18. | "Daniel" (Radio Edit) | Natasha Khan | Crying on the Bathroom Floor (2021) | 3:19 |
| 19. | "Why Does It Hurt" | Young; Stilwell; Eliot | Previously unreleased (2022) | 3:42 |
| 20. | "Breaking Free" | Young; Stilwell; Eliot | Previously unreleased | 3:31 |

Disc two
| No. | Title | Writer(s) | Length |
|---|---|---|---|
| 1. | "Leave Right Now" (live session for Zoe Ball at Radio 2) | White | 3:44 |
| 2. | "What Is Love" (live session for Zoe Ball at Radio 2) | Tony Hendrik; Junior Torello | 2:42 |
| 3. | "Hanging on the Telephone" (live for Dermot O'Leary's Saturday Sessions) | Jack Lee | 3:26 |
| 4. | "All Time Love" (live recording for BBC Radio 2) | Hartman | 3:58 |
| 5. | "Hey Ya!" (live for Jo Whitley's Live Lounge) | André Benjamin | 4:49 |
| 6. | "Take My Breath Away" (live for Dermot O'Leary's Saturday Sessions) | Tom Whitlock; Giorgio Moroder | 4:01 |
| 7. | "Love Revolution" (live for Radio 2's 500 Words at St. James' Palace) | Young; Stilwell; Eliot; Matias; Martin; Clement; Borrmann | 3:23 |
| 8. | "Your Game" (live for Jo Whitley's Live Lounge) | Young; Cruz; MacKichan | 4:06 |
| 9. | "Golden Slumbers" (live for Dermot O'Leary's Saturday Sessions) | Lennon; McCartney | 3:32 |
| 10. | "How Will I Know" (live for Radio 2's 500 Words at St. James' Palace) | Shannon Rubicam; George Merrill; Narada Michael Walden | 4:02 |
| 11. | "Running Up That Hill" (live for Dermot O'Leary's Saturday Sessions) | Kate Bush | 2:57 |
| 12. | "Your Game" (demo) | Young; Cruz; MacKichan | 3:51 |
| 13. | "Jealousy" (demo) | Young; Stilwell; Eliot | 4:04 |

== Charts ==
Weekly chart performance for 20 Years: The Greatest Hits
| Chart (2022) | Peak position |
|---|---|
| Scottish Albums (OCC) | 5 |
| UK Albums (OCC) | 6 |

== See also ==
- List of UK top-ten albums in 2022
