= Lilliu =

Lilliu is a surname. Notable people with the surname include:

- Giovanni Lilliu (1914–2012), Italian archeologist, academician, publicist, and politician
- Nyco Lilliu (born 1987), French singer, brother of Pierrick
- Pierrick Lilliu (born 1986), French singer
