= Friday's Child (album) =

Studio album by Will Young
- Released: 1 December 2003
- Genre: Pop
- Length: 48:47
- Label: 19; S; RCA; BMG
- Producer: Chris Dodd; Stephen Lipson; Blair MacKichan; Matt Prime; Pro-Jay; Toby Smith; Robin Thicke; Eg White

Will Young chronology
| From Now On (2002) | Friday's Child (2003) | Keep On (2005) |

Singles from Friday's Child
- 1. "Leave Right Now" Released: 24 November 2003; 2. "Your Game" Released: 15 March 2004; 3. "Friday's Child" Released: 5 July 2004

Friday's Child is the second studio album by English singer Will Young. It was released on 1 December 2003 and reached number one on the UK Albums Chart. The album has gone 5× Platinum in the UK, with worldwide sales of over 1.8 million. The second single taken from the album, "Your Game", won Best British Single at the 2005 Brit Awards.

== Critical reception ==
Professional ratings
Review scores
| Source | Rating |
|---|---|
| AllMusic | 4/5 stars |
| The Guardian | 3/5 stars |
| MTV Asia | 6/10 |
| Yahoo! Music UK | 7/10 |

Allmusic editor Jon O'Brien found that "Young has made the brave decision to move away from pop's most influential man Simon Cowell for follow-up Friday's Child [...] It's a much more personal affair that showcases both his songwriting talent and his undoubtedly unique soulful tones [...] While certainly far more adventurous than his debut, it still sometimes lapses into MOR territory, particularly on the Simply Red-esque "Free" and the rather aimless and ultimately quite drab acoustic ballad "Very Kind." But overall, Friday's Child will undoubtedly bury the reality pop tag once and for all. Britain's first Pop Idol has become an artist in his own right and the fact he's done it without the Cowell juggernaut behind him should make its success even sweeter." Dan Gennoe from Yahoo! Music UK concluded: "With little in the way of straight-up pop, let alone obvious singles, his choice of career path is undoubtedly a gamble. But it's one that shows admirable integrity and is, for the most part, amply repaid."

== Track listing ==
| No. | Title | Writer(s) | Producer(s) | Length |
|---|---|---|---|---|
| 1. | "Love the One You're With" | Stephen Stills | Stephen Lipson | 3:35 |
| 2. | "Your Game" | Will Young; Blair MacKichan; Tayo Onile-Ere | Lipson; MacKichan | 4:10 |
| 3. | "Stronger" | Lipson; Karen Poole | Lipson | 5:18 |
| 4. | "Leave Right Now" | Eg White | Lipson | 3:34 |
| 5. | "Love is a Matter of Distance" | Tim Christensen | Lipson | 2:58 |
| 6. | "Dance the Night Away" | Young; Toby Smith; Chris Dodd | Smith; Dodd | 4:05 |
| 7. | "Very Kind" | Young; Robin Thicke; James Gass | Thicke; Pro-Jay; Lipson^{[a]} | 5:10 |
| 8. | "Free" | Young; Matt Prime; Bill Withers; Stanley McKenny | Lipson; Prime | 4:07 |
| 9. | "Going My Way" | Young; White | White | 3:41 |
| 10. | "Out of My Mind" | Young; White | Lipson | 3:07 |
| 11. | "Friday's Child" | Steve Lee; Dina Taylor | Lipson; Lee^{[b]} | 9:02 |

Notes

- ^{^[a]} signifies an additional producer
- ^{^[b]} signifies an original producer

== Personnel ==
Performers and musicians

- Will Young – vocals
- Toby Baker – keyboards
- Anne Dudley – keyboards
- Greg Wells – keyboards
- Rick Willson – guitar
- Stephen Lipson – guitar
- John Themis – guitar
- David Rainger – guitar
- Tim Cansfield – guitar
- Eg White – guitar, instruments on "Going My Way" and "Out of My Mind"
- Blair MacKichan – guitar, backing vocals
- Neil Conti – drums
- Steve Barney – drums
- Guy Barker – trumpet
- Neil Yates – brass arrangements
- Phil Todd – flute
- Mark Feltham – harmonica
- Steve Lee – harmonica
- Tracy Ackerman – backing vocals
- Lynne Marie – backing vocals
- Karen Poole – backing vocals
- Metro Voices – gospel choir
- Toby Smith – instruments on "Dance the Night Away"
- Chris Dodd – instruments on "Dance the Night Away"

Technical

- Stephen Lipson – producer, programmer
- Blair MacKichan – producer, programmer
- Toby Smith – producer, mixer, brass arrangement
- Chris Dodd – producer
- Robin Thicke – producer
- Pro-Jay – producer, engineer
- Eg White – producer, mixer
- Dave Naughton – ProTools
- Heff Moraes – engineer, mixer
- Andy Saunders – mix engineer
- Sam Miller – additional engineering
- Steve Lee – programming
- Jenny O'Grady – choir master
- Nick Ingman – orchestral arrangement
- Anne Dudley – orchestral arrangement

== Charts ==
=== Weekly charts ===
| Chart (2003) | Peak position |
|---|---|
| Irish Albums (IRMA) | 1 |
| Scottish Albums (OCC) | 3 |
| UK Albums (OCC) | 1 |

=== Year-end charts ===
| Chart (2003) | Position |
|---|---|
| UK Albums (OCC) | 12 |
| Chart (2004) | Position |
| UK Albums (OCC) | 21 |
| Chart (2005) | Position |
| UK Albums (OCC) | 198 |

== Certifications ==
| Region | Certification | Certified units/sales |
|---|---|---|
| United Kingdom (BPI) | 5× Platinum | 1,713,929 |
