= Caroline Costa =

French singer and TV presenter

Caroline Costa Subtil
- Born: Caroline Costa Subtil; 9 May 1996 (age 30); Moissac, Occitanie, France
- Genre: Pop
- Occupations: Singer, tv presenter
- Instrument: Vocals
- Years active: 2007 – present
- Label: EMI
- Formerly of: Pop System
- Website: carolinecosta.fr

Caroline Costa Subtil (born 9 May 1996), known professionally as Caroline Costa, is a French singer and TV presenter.

== Early life ==
Born May 9, 1996 in Moissac. Caroline Costa grew up in the Tarn-et-Garonne in Castelsarrasin, with her parents Laurence and Joaquim Costa, and her sister Lucie. She is of Portuguese, Spanish, Italian and French origin.

=== In Pop System ===
Caroline Costa was born in 1996 in France, to a French mother, Laurence, and Portuguese father, Joaquim. She had great success as a youngster. In 2007, she was chosen as part of the 6-member teen group Pop System (sometimes Popsystem) for the French children's series Iapiap! broadcast on Canal J, where she was mentored by M. Pokora. Pop System enjoyed great popularity in the period 2007–2008 and released the single "Laissez-nous dire" that reached No. 12 on the French Singles Chart. The teen group was made up of the girls Caroline, Marina, Sarah, Lisa and the boys Nicolas and Joris.

=== In La France a un incroyable talent ===
In 2008, she appeared on the French television channel M6's program 100% Mag. In November 2008, she took part in the M6 reality television series La France a un incroyable talent where she reached the finale. She auditioned with Hurt from Christina Aguilera, and received a standing ovation. In the next round, she performed "My Heart Will Go On" by Céline Dion. In the finale Costa performed "I Will Always Love You" by Whitney Houston and finished runner-up for the season with the title going to Alexandre, a fire juggler.

=== Solo career ===
She started her solo music career in 2009. In 2009, she did a duet with the Spanish teen actor/pop singer Abraham Mateo for a Spanish cover of Badfinger's "Without You" (that was a huge hit when covered by Harry Nilsson in 1971, then by Mariah Carey in 1994) and had many television appearances and appeared again on 100% Mag. In September of the same year, she was part of a charity album release for the French AIDS charity AIDES, working with famous artists like Daniel Powter, Lara Fabian and Christophe Willem.

Her first solo single released in France was "Qui je suis" in December 2010. The EP included besides "Qui je suis", an instrumental version of the same song, also "Mon secret" and a cover of "Take a Bow".

In December 2011 her single "Je t'ai menti" was released in duet with Swedish upcoming artist Ulrik Munther alongside a music video that was first broadcast on NRJ Hits. The song is a French version of "Kill for Lies", a famous song by Ulrik Munther. This was a pre-release for her debut studio album J'irai, released on 5 March 2012.

=== TV presenter ===
She started presenting the French television program Kids 20 on the French children's channel Télétoon +.

=== Musical show ===
Since 2012, she has participated in the famous French musical show about Robin Hood, Robin des Bois (full title Robin des Bois: Ne renoncez jamais). She plays the role of Bedelia, the sheriff's daughter, who falls in love with Adrien, Robin's son. The cast of the musical comedy includes Matt Pokora, Stephanie Bedard, Caroline Costa, Sacha Tran, Dume, Nyco Lilliu and Marc Antoine. They performed many shows in Paris before going on to other cities in France, Belgium and Switzerland. The show has been a huge success. In 2013, the cast won an NRJ Music Award for Francophone Duo/Group of the Year.

== In popular culture ==
- On 9 July 2011, she appeared in the popular French television adventure and games show Fort Boyard on the channel France 2. At age 15, she is the youngest participant on the show.
- On 21 December 2011, she took part besides many other artists in La France a un incroyable talent le rappel (a look back on highlights of earlier participants) and sang "Ave Maria" by Beyoncé Knowles.

== Discography ==
=== Albums ===
Year	Album	Peak chart positions		Certifications	Notes
Year	Album	FR	BEL (Wa)	Certifications	Notes
2012	J'irai: Date released: 2 March 2012; Record label: EMI	62	53		Track listing: 1. "On a beau dire" 2. "Je t'ai menti (Kill for Lies)" (duo with Ulrik Munther); 3. "Allez viens" 4. "Ce lien" 5. "Ti amo" 6. "J'irai"; 7. "Toi et moi" 8. "Comment vivre sans toi" 9. "Je t'emmène" 10. "Danse"; 11. "Together"

=== EPs ===
- 2011: Qui je suis

=== Singles ===
with Pop System

Year	Single	Peak chart positions	Certifications	Album
Year	Single	FR	Certifications	Album
2007	"Laissez nous dire"	12		

Solo

Year	Single	Peak chart positions		Certifications	Album
Year	Single	FR	BEL (Wal)	Certifications	Album
2010	"Qui je suis"	15	–		Qui je suis (EP)
2011	"Je t'ai menti" (Caroline Costa & Ulrik Munther)	107	6		J'irai
2012	"On a beau dire" (Caroline Costa )	–	–		J'irai
2016	"Maintenant"	171	–		
2017	"Ailleurs"	–	–		
