= Latin Lovers (2014 album) =

Compilation album by Various artists
- Released: 23 June 2014
- Label: M6

Singles from Latin Lovers
- 1. "Vous les femmes" Released: April 2014; 2. "La camisa negra" Released: June 2014; 3. "Solamente Tù" Released: September 2014

Latin Lovers is a compilation album produced by M6 Métropole Télévision joining well-known artists. The album was released on 23 June 2014 and includes tributes to Latin music.

== Covers ==
The album includes covers of classic Latin hits from:

- Pablo Alborán (Spain)
- Francis Cabrel (France)
- Davide Esposito (Italy)
- Julio Iglesias (Spain)
- Juanes (Colombia)
- Grégory Lemarchal (France)
- Madonna (United States)
- Ricky Martin (Puerto Rico)
- Miami Sound Machine (United States)
- Eros Ramazzotti (Italy)
- Santana (United States)

== Artists ==
The songs were interpreted by:

- Pablo Alborán (Spain)
- Julio Iglesias Jr. (Spain)
- Nyco Lilliu (France)
- Debi Nova (Costa Rica)
- Nuno Resende (Portugal)
- Damien Sargue (France)

Nyco Lilliu released a music video for "La solitudine", a cover of a song by Laura Pausini, but it was not an official single for him.

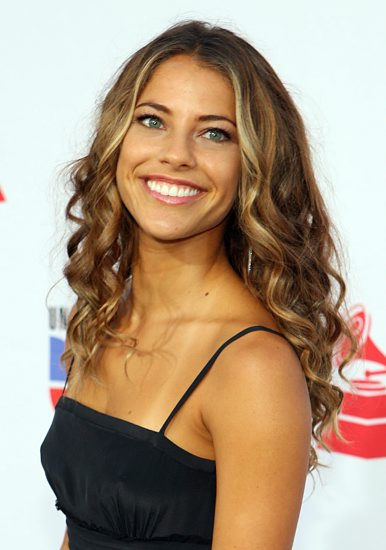
Debi Nova

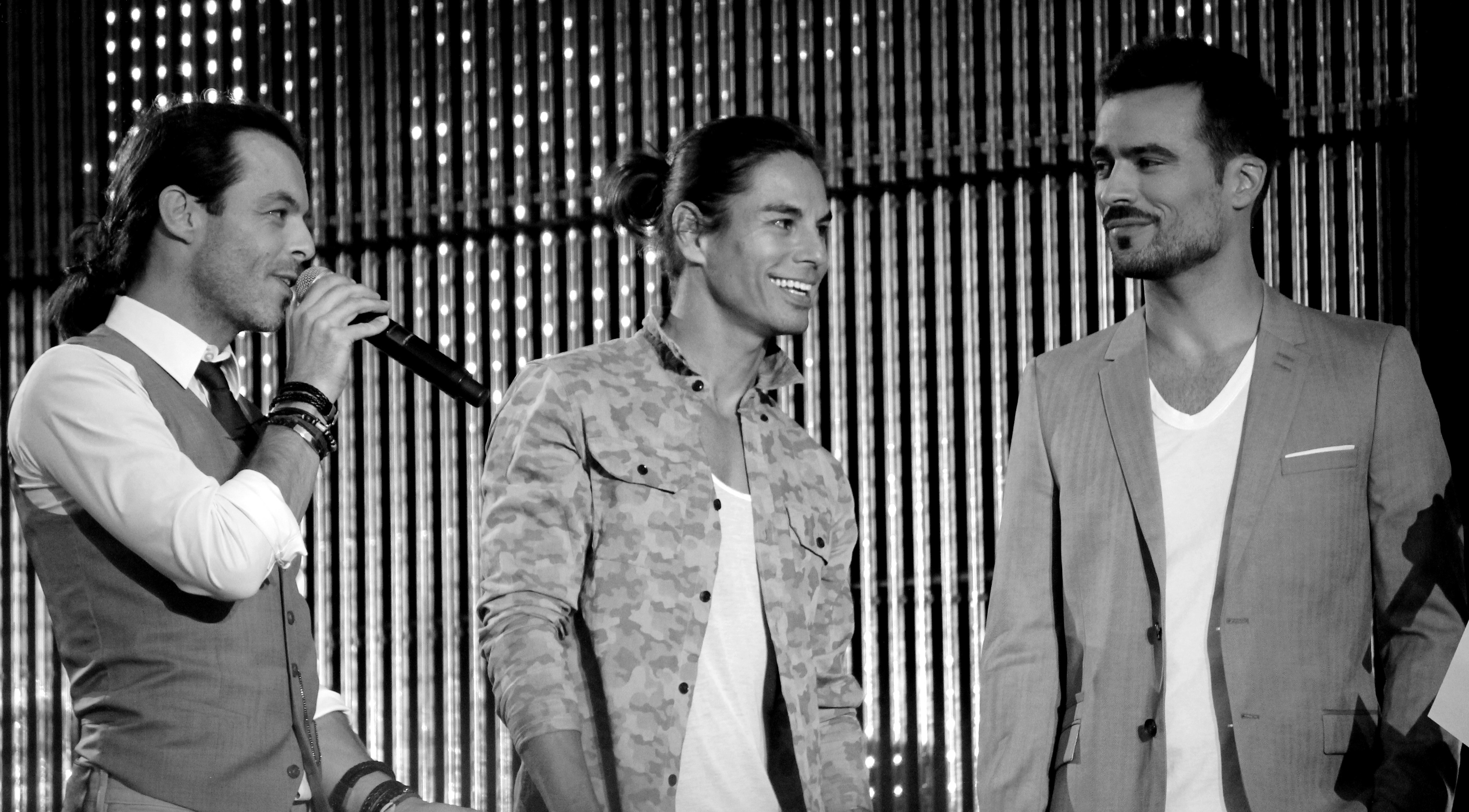
Nuno Resende, Julio Iglesias Jr., Damien Sargue

== Track listing ==
No.	Title	Singer(s)	Length
1.	"La camisa negra" (from Juanes)	Nuno Resende, Julio Iglesias Jr.
2.	"Maria Maria" (from Santana)	Nuno Resende, Julio Iglesias Jr., Damien Sargue
3.	"Solamente Tù" (from Pablo Alborán)	Damien Sargue, Pablo Alborán
4.	"Più bella cosa" (from Eros Ramazzotti)	Nuno Resende, Julio Iglesias Jr., Nyco Lilliu
5.	"Vous les femmes (Pobre diablo)" (from Julio Iglesias)	Nuno Resende, Julio Iglesias Jr., Damien Sargue
6.	"Livin' La Vida Loca" (from Ricky Martin)	Nuno Resende, Julio Iglesias Jr.
7.	"Una storia importante" (from Eros Ramazzotti)	Damien Sargue, Nyco Lilliu
8.	"La Isla Bonita" (from Madonna)	Nuno Resende, Julio Iglesias Jr.
9.	"La Solitudine" (from Laura Pausini)	Nyco Lilliu
10.	"L'Encre de tes yeux / Todo aquello que escribí" (from Francis Cabrel)	Nuno Resende, Damien Sargue
11.	"Conga" (from Miami Sound Machine)	Nuno Resende, Debi Nova
12.	"Écris l'histoire / Io so che tu" (from Grégory Lemarchal and Davide Esposito)	Nuno Resende, Damien Sargue
13.	"A Garota de Ipanema"	Nuno Resende

=== Bonus tracks ===
No.	Title	Singer(s)	Length
1.	"Historia de un amor from Carlos Eleta Almaran"	Nuno Resende, Damien Sargue
2.	"Essa moça ta diferente from Chico Buarque"	Nuno Resende

== Charts ==
=== Weekly charts ===
Chart (2014)	Peak position
Belgian Albums (Ultratop Wallonia)	13
French Albums (SNEP)	7

=== Year-end charts ===
Chart (2014)	Position
Belgian Albums (Ultratop Wallonia)	121
