= Pop System =

French teen pop band

Background information
- Origin: France
- Genres: Teen pop
- Years active: 2007-2008
- Past members: Caroline Costa; Sarah Py; Joris Zapiain; Lisa Brunet; Marina D'Amico; Nicolas Nalté

Pop System (sometimes Popsystem) was a popular teen pop band in France. The band came to prominence in 2007 with the French children's program Iapiap! broadcast on French Canal J presented by Khriss where they were mentored by French star M. Pokora. The band was made up of four girls, Caroline, Marina, Sarah, Lisa and two boys Nicolas, Joris.

They had great success with their hit single "Laissez-nous dire" reaching #12 on the French Singles Chart. The song stayed a total of 17 weeks on the chart. It also appeared in the compilation album Hit Machine Summer 2007 on Sony BMG.

== After split-up ==
The band split up in 2008. The group member Caroline Costa developed a solo career and had a hit in 2010 entitled "Qui je suis" that reached #15 on the French Singles Chart. She has released her debut album J'irai in March 2012.

== Discography ==
Year	Single	Peak chart positions	Certifications	Album
Year	Single	FR	Certifications	Album
2007	"Laissez nous dire"	12		
