= Marc Antoine (singer) =

Canadian singer

- Born: Marc Antoine Jr. 26 April 1977 (age 49); Montreal, Quebec, Canada
- Origin: Canadian singer
- Genres: Pop, R&B
- Occupations: Singer, songwriter
- Website: www.marcantoine-lesite.com

Marc Antoine (born 26 April 1977) is a Canadian singer.

== Biography ==
Born in Montreal, Quebec, Antoine was a musical talent from a young age impersonating celebrities. His parents were fans of various types of music (soul, French music, zouk, kompa etc.). As an 11-year adolescent, he was part of a family group Eden with his brothers imitating harmonized tunes in the style of Boyz II Men.

Marc Antoine studied law but concentrated on his music. After meeting renowned Montreal producer Sonny Black, he has broken as a local artist in Quebec city and in France with three albums, Comme il se doit (2008), the follow-up Notre histoire (2010) and Je ferai tout (2013). He has had a number of charting singles in France, Belgium and Quebec. "Tant besoin de toi" taken from his debut single remains his most successful hit having reached No. 4 on the SNEP French Singles Chart.

== Musical theatre ==
Marc Antoine is playing the role of Petit Jean (Little John) in the 2013 French musical Robin des Bois. He performs "Lui sait qui je suis" as solo in his role, and sings "À nous" with Nyco Lilliu (Frère Tuck) and M. Pokora (Robin des Bois

== Discography ==
=== Albums ===
| Year | Album | Charts | | Certification |
| Year | Album | BEL Wa | FR | Certification |
|---|---|---|---|---|
| 2008 | Comme il se doit | 78 | 11 | |
| 2010 | Notre histoire | – | 26 | |
| 2013 | Je ferai tout | – | | |

=== Singles ===
| Year | Single | Charts | | Certification | Album |
| Year | Single | BEL Wa | FR | Certification | Album |
|---|---|---|---|---|---|
| 2008 | "Tant besoin de toi" | 4 (Ultratip) | 4 | | Comme il se doit |
| 2008 | "Comme il se doit" | 6 (Ultratip) | 10 | | Comme il se doit |
| 2008 | "Triste novembre" | – | 43 | | Comme il se doit |
| 2012 | "Je ferai tout" | – | – | | Je ferai tout |
| 2013 | "À nous" (with M. Pokora & Nyco Lilliu) | 26 (Ultratip) | – | | Robin des Bois |

Featured in

| Year | Single | Charts | Certification | Album |
| Year | Single | FR | Certification | Album |
|---|---|---|---|---|
| 2008 | "J'suis KO"; Singuila featuring Marc Antoine) | 20 | | |

Songs

- 2006: "Triste novembre"
- 2008: "Tant besoin de toi" (music video by John Gabriel Biggs)
- 2008: "Triste novembre" (2nd version) (music video by John Gabriel Biggs)
- 2008: "Comme il se doit"
- 2008: "Plus rien à perdre"
- 2010: "Qui tu aimes"
- 2010: "Ballade a la Marc Antoine"
- 2010: "Nous"
- 2010: "Remonter le temps (tu me manques) (Marc Antoine and Sarah Riani)
- 2011: "La promesse"
- 2012: "Je ferai tout"

== Awards and nominations ==
- In 2009, Antoine won an International Achievement Award at the Francophone SOCAN Awards in Montreal.
- In 2010, nominated for "Francophone Revelation of the Year" at the NRJ Music Awards
