= Friday's Child (Will Young song) =

2004 single by Will Young

Single by Will Young

from the album Friday's Child
- B-side: "Hey Ya"
- Released: 5 July 2004
- Length: 9:02 (album version); 4:10 (single version)
- Label: 19; S; RCA; BMG
- Songwriters: Stephen Lee; Dina Taylor
- Producer: Stephen Lipson

Will Young singles chronology
"Your Game" (2004)	"Friday's Child" (2004)	"Switch It On" (2005)

"Friday's Child" is a song by British singer Will Young. It was written by Stephen Lee and Dina Taylor and produced by Stephen Lipson for Young's second studio album, Friday's Child (2003), based on original production by Lee. The song was released as the album's third single on 5 July 2004. "Friday's Child" reached number four on the UK Singles Chart (his first not to reach the top three) and number 31 on the Irish Singles Chart.

== Music video ==
A video for "Friday's Child" was directed by Dougal Wilson and inspired by Young's grandfather who swam in the Olympics. It depicts Young on his journey to ultimately becoming an Olympic Games swimmer. He is seen starting lessons with armbands and later with floats, then undertaking lifesaving lessons and doing time-trials with an instructor. At the second chorus he is seen taking part in a swimming race, which he wins. A representative for the Olympic Games is among the spectators and is seen holding a clipboard, which the camera zooms into paperwork on the clipboard bearing the question "Good enough for Olympics?" to which the 'yes' box is ticked. He later becomes the new Olympic champion when representing England at swimming in the Olympic Games. The last shots of the video depict him on the podium with a gold medal at the Olympics and later swimming the English Channel and being presented with a medal for his efforts.

== Track listings ==
UK and Irish CD1
No.	Title	Writer(s)	Producer(s)	Length
1.	"Friday's Child" (single version)	Stephen Lee; Dina Taylor	Stephen Lipson; Lee^{[a]}	4:10
2.	"Hey Ya"	Benjmain Andre	Lipson	4:27
3.	"Friday's Child" (Andy Cato 12-inch mix)	Lee; Taylor	Lipson; Lee^{[a]}; Andy Cato^{[b]}	6:01
4.	"Friday's Child" (video)			7:37

UK and Irish CD2
No.	Title	Writer(s)	Producer(s)	Length
1.	"Friday's Child" (single version)	Lee; Taylor	Lipson; Lee^{[a]}	4:10
2.	"Friday's Child" (Andy Cato 12-inch mix)	Lee; Taylor	Lipson; Lee^{[a]}; Cato^{[b]}	6:01

Digital download
No.	Title	Writer(s)	Length
1.	"Friday's Child" (live at Wembley)	Lee; Taylor	5:47

Notes

- ^{^[a]} denotes original producer(s)
- ^{^[b]} denotes remix producer(s)

== Personnel ==
- Tracy Ackerman – backing vocals
- Niall Acott – recording engineer
- Tim Cansfield – guitar
- Mark Feltham – harmonica
- Isobel Griffiths – orchestra contracting
- Nick Ingman – orchestral arrangement
- Tim Jenkins – recording assistance
- Stephen Lee – harmonica, original production, programming, writing
- Stephen Lipson – production
- Heff Moraes – engineering
- Steve Price – recording engineer
- Dina Taylor – writing
- Phil Todd – flute solo
- Steven Wolf – drum programming

== Charts ==
=== Weekly charts ===
Weekly chart performance for "Friday's Child"
Chart (2004)	Peak position
Europe (Eurochart Hot 100)	16
Ireland (IRMA)	31
Scottish Singles Sales (Official Charts)	8
UK Singles (Official Charts)	4

=== Year-end charts ===
Year-end chart performance for "Friday's Child"
Chart (2004)	Position
UK Singles (OCC)	141

== Release history ==
Release dates and formats for "Friday's Child"
Region	Date	Format(s)	Label(s)	Ref.
United Kingdom	5 July 2004	CD	19; S; RCA; BMG	
