= A Night with... =

- Genre: Entertainment
- Directed by: Declan Lowney (Beyonce)
- Presented by: Kate Thornton; Steve Jones
- Country of origin: United Kingdom
- Original language: English
- No. of episodes: 2

Production
- Production locations: The London Studios; Fountain Studios
- Running time: 60 minutes (includes adverts)

Original release
- Network: ITV
- Release: 27 August – 4 December 2011

Related
- ITV Specials; The Nation's Favourite

A Night with is a British entertainment show on ITV featuring well-known musicians. The first episode starred Will Young and was presented by Kate Thornton, airing on 27 August at 9pm. The second episode starred Beyoncé and was presented by Steve Jones, airing on 4 December at 9pm.

== Episodes ==
#	Date Aired	Presenter	Starring	Location
1	27 August 2011	Kate Thornton	Will Young	The London Studios
2	4 December 2011	Steve Jones	Beyoncé	Fountain Studios

== Reception ==
The Daily Record's David Mark said the show provided Will Young with a "unique and intimate platform" that was "hosted, rather bizarrely by Kate Thornton". David Smyth of the London Evening Standard praised Young's musical performance in the show as "live, loud and tightly drilled". He called "Your Game" "stirring" and thought "Who Am I" was "cleverly staged".
