= Un monde à changer =

2012 single by Nyco Lilliu

Single by Nyco Lilliu

from the album Robin des Bois
- Released: September 2012
- Recorded: 2012
- Genre: Pop
- Songwriters: Lionel Florence; Patrice Guirao; Matthieu Mendès

Nyco Lilliu singles chronology
"Tu ed io più lei" (2011)	"Un monde à changer" (2012)

"Un monde à changer" is a French language single by French singer and actor Nyco Lilliu, his debut charting single.

The song written and composed by Lionel Florence, Patrice Guirao and Matthieu Mendès is taken from the forthcoming French musical Robin des Bois, an adaptation of Robin Hood, that premiered on Palais des congrès de Paris on 26 September 2013 starring M. Pokora. Nyco Lilliu plays the role of Frère Tuck (in English Friar Tuck).

== Music video ==
The song is accompanied by a music video, which is a modern take bringing old and new elements from his role as Friar Tuck singing and dancing in the hoods or in contemporary Paris streets.

== Charts ==
The song has appeared in SNEP, the official French music charts first on 29 September 2012, a full year prior to the launch of the musical. It has peaked at number 114, spending (until start of December 2012) seven weeks in the charts.

The single has also charted in Ultratip French-language charts in Belgium where it reached #11 based on downloads and radio play. It also reached #27 on the main Ultratop 50 chart based on actual record sales.

Chart (2012)	Peak position
Ultratip Belgian Singles Chart (Wallonia)	11
Ultratop Belgian Singles Chart (Wallonia)	27
SNEP French Singles Chart	114
