= Light It Up (Will Young album) =

Studio album by Will Young
- Released: 9 August 2024
- Length: 35:49
- Label: BMG Rights Management; Fascination

Will Young chronology
20 Years: The Greatest Hits (2022)	Light It Up (2024)

Singles from Light It Up
- 1. "Falling Deep" Released: 18 April 2024; 2. "Midnight" Released: 7 June 2024; 3. "Light It Up" Released: 5 July 2024

Professional ratings
Review scores
Source	Rating
Clash	6/10
Euphoria	4/5 stars
Monstagigz	3.5/5 stars
Retropop	4/5 stars
The Scotsman	3/5 stars

Light It Up is the ninth studio album by British singer Will Young. It was released on 9 August 2024 through BMG Rights Management and Fascination. It is the singer's first release since 2022's Greatest Hits compilation, 20 Years: The Greatest Hits. It is also his first studio album of wholly original material since 2019's Lexicon.

== Background ==
Upon the release of "Falling Deep", the album's first single, Young announced the parent album's release, stating, "I really hope this is the go-to pop album for a dance, for a cry and for a celebration. I know I do all three with it." He also announced a tour.

== Promotion ==
On 6 August 2024, Young appeared on Rylan Clark's BBC podcast, Rylan: How to Be in the Spotlight. On 12 August 2024, Young performed a concert at The Wardrobe, Leeds. The gig was praised in a review by The Yorkshire Post. On 14 August 2024, Young appeared on the ITV1 daytime chat show Loose Women to talk about the album. On 19 August 2024, he appeared on The One Show to discuss his career and Light It Up.

== Singles ==
The album's first single, "Falling Deep", was released 18 April 2024. The official music video, directed by Samuel Douek, was released on the same day. "Falling Deep" debuted and peaked at number 62 on the UK Singles Downloads Chart.

"Midnight" was released on 7 June 2024 as the album's second official single. It reached number 96 on the UK Singles Downloads Chart.

The album's third single, "Light It Up", and an accompanying video again directed by Douek, was released on 5 July 2024.

On the day of the album's release, Young released a music video for album track "The Worst".

== Chart performance ==
In the United Kingdom, Light It Up debuted at number 1 on the Album Downloads Chart, number 2 on the Album Sales Chart and number 5 on the main Album Chart. It also debuted at number 5 on the Vinyl Albums Chart.

== Tour ==
On 18 April 2024, Young announced he would embark on a UK tour to support the album in the autumn of 2024.

== Track listing ==
Light It Up track listing
No.	Title	Writer(s)	Producer(s)	Length
1.	"Falling Deep"	Will Young; Daniel Davidsen; David Brook; Fraser Churchill; Peter Wallevik	PhD	3:08
2.	"Light It Up"	Davidsen; Peter Wallevik; Tom King	PhD	2:47
3.	"Feels Just Like a Win"	Christian Braid; Danny Burton; Jean-Pierre Sutcliffe	Jim Eliot	4:03
4.	"Midnight"	Young; Eliot; Mima	Eliot	3:23
5.	"Me Without You"	Davidsen; Wallevik; Nick Bradley; Raphaella Mazaheri-Asadi	PhD	4:31
6.	"The Worst"	Davidsen; Wallevik; Celine Svanbäck; Sam Merrifield	PhD	2:58
7.	"No Man's Land"	Davidsen; Wallevik; Molly Irvine; Olivia Sebastianelli	PhD	3:02
8.	"Talk About It"	Young; Eliot; Mima	Eliot	3:43
9.	"Everything But You"	Young; Andy Cato	Eliot	4:27
10.	"I Won't Let You Down"	Jim Diamond; Tony Hymas	Cato; Theo Coecup	3:44
Total length:				35:49

== Charts ==
Chart performance for Light It Up
Chart (2024)	Peak position
Scottish Albums (OCC)	3
UK Albums (OCC)	5
UK Independent Albums (OCC)	2
