= Have Fun, Go Mad =

1995 single by Blair MacKichan

Single by Blair
- Released: 21 August 1995
- Recorded: 1995
- Genre: Jazz-funk

Blair singles chronology
"Have Fun, Go Mad" (1995)	"Life?" (1996)

"Have Fun, Go Mad"

Single by Tweenies

from the album CBeebies - The Official Album and Everybody Dance
- Released: 2 September 2002
- Genre: Children's; novelty
- Length: 3:23
- Label: BBC Music
- Producer: Anon

Tweenies singles chronology
""Bananas"" (2001)	"Have Fun, Go Mad" (2002)

"Have Fun, Go Mad" is a single from English musician and songwriter Blair, released in 1995. It reached number 37 in the UK Singles Chart, number 81 on The Australian ARIA Charts and number 41 on the New Zealand Charts in 1998.

Chart commentator James Masterton described the Blair song as "a lively jazz-funk track in a similar vein to many Jamiroquai offerings, sounds brilliant on the radio in hot weather and yet looks as if it will miss out on being a major hit."

== Film usage ==
It was included on the soundtracks of the films The Daytrippers, Dunston Checks In (1996), Bean: The Ultimate Disaster Movie (1997), and Sliding Doors (1998).

== Covers ==
The song was covered by the Tweenies and featured on the album, My CBeebies Album. It reached number 20 on the UK Singles Chart in September 2002.
