= Leave Right Now =

2003 single by Will Young

Single by Will Young

from the album Friday's Child
- B-side: "Cry"; "Ticket to Love" (live)
- Released: 24 November 2003
- Length: 3:31
- Label: RCA; BMG; 19; S
- Songwriter: Eg White
- Producer: Stephen Lipson

Will Young singles chronology
"Don't Let Me Down" / "You and I" (2002)	"Leave Right Now" (2003)	"Your Game" (2004)

Alternative covers
- Australian artwork

"Leave Right Now" is a song by British singer Will Young. It was written by Eg White and produced by Stephen Lipson for Young's second studio album, Friday's Child (2003). A song about unrequited love, it was released as the album's first single, becoming another number-one hit on the Irish and the UK Singles Chart.

White was awarded the Ivor Novello Award for Best Song Musically and Lyrically for "Leave Right Now" in 2004. The song was later also included on the international version of Young's third album, Keep On (2005). It also served as the exit song for the ninth season of American Idol. Young performed it on the penultimate episode to accompany a video montage recapping the season on 25 May 2010.

== Critical reception ==
Stylus Magazine, who were mostly mixed to negative for Young's previous number ones, rated "Leave Right Now" with 9/10, saying "Better. Much, much better. By this time Will was comfortable as a popstar, prepared to add a little WTF to his videos (here he has a fight with the viewer in an art gallery), and had his style down pat: jacket and jeans rocked to a level not seen since Lovejoy and Tinker were bossing things in the late 80s. He had songs to match as well: 'Leave Right Now' is just one of the most English songs ever, which is understandable: what could be more English than a privately educated homosexual? The guy's a moderate genius—Dido with testicles and a heart." In 2007, Freaky Trigger ranked the song at number 54 in their list of the "Top 100 Songs of All Time," with critic Pete Baran calling it "one of the ballsiest songs of the noughties." In 2020, The Guardian ranked "Leave Right Now" at number 74 in its list of "The 100 greatest UK No 1 singles".

== Commercial performance ==
The single went to number one in the UK Singles Chart and stayed there for two weeks, selling 117,702 copies in its first week. As of December 2018, the single had sold 638,000 copies, (728,000 including streaming equivalent sales). The song has sold 50,000 copies in the United States according to Billboard, with 32,000 of those occurring the week he performed on American Idol.

== Music video ==
A music video for "Leave Right Now" was directed by Kevin Godley. The clip, which has no transitions and features actress Kelly Wenham as one of the party guests, features Young at a private view where a fight starts and he gets caught up in it.

The video is set in first person perspective, showing the viewer in a conversation with the guests, the guests' heads turning when they notice Young, and other guests speaking to the viewer when Young refuses to leave the view to ask if they are okay.

== Track listings ==
UK CD single
No.	Title	Writer(s)	Producer(s)	Length
1.	"Leave Right Now"	Eg White	Stephen Lipson	3:33
2.	"Cry"	Young; Julian Gallagher; Richard Stannard	Gallagher; Stannard	4:20
3.	"Leave Right Now" (acoustic)	White	Lipson	4:12
4.	"Leave Right Now" (video)			3:36

European CD single
No.	Title	Writer(s)	Producer(s)	Length
1.	"Leave Right Now"	White	Lipson	3:33
2.	"Ticket to Love" (live at Exeter Festival 2003)	Cathy Dennis; Young		5:23

Australian CD single
No.	Title	Writer(s)	Producer(s)	Length
1.	"Leave Right Now"	White	Lipson	3:33
2.	"Ticket to Love" (live at Exeter Festival 2003)	Dennis; Young		5:23
3.	"Cry"	Young; Julian Gallagher; Richard Stannard	Gallagher; Stannard	4:20
4.	"Leave Right Now" (acoustic)	White	Lipson	4:12
5.	"Leave Right Now" (video)			3:36

== Personnel ==
- Tracey Ackerman – backing vocals
- Steve Barney – drums
- Anne Dudley – orchestra arranger
- Stephen Lipson – producer, programming
- Heff Moraes – mixing engineer
- John Themis – guitar
- Greg Wells – keyboards
- Eg White – Pro Tools
- Will Young – guitar, vocals

== Charts ==
=== Weekly charts ===
Weekly chart performance for "Leave Right Now"
Chart (2003–2010)	Peak position
Australia (ARIA)	63
Belgium (Ultratip Bubbling Under Flanders)	14
Canada (Nielsen SoundScan)	69
Europe (Eurochart Hot 100)	3
Ireland (IRMA)	1
Italy (FIMI)	27
Netherlands (Single Top 100)	36
New Zealand (Recorded Music NZ)	29
Norway (VG-lista)	17
Scotland Singles (OCC)	1
Sweden (Sverigetopplistan)	6
UK Singles (OCC)	1
US Billboard Hot 100	81
US Adult Contemporary (Billboard)	19
US Heatseekers Songs (Billboard)	5

=== Year-end charts ===
2003 year-end chart performance for "Leave Right Now"
Chart (2003)	Position
Ireland (IRMA)	14
UK Singles (OCC)	5

2004 year-end chart performance for "Leave Right Now"
Chart (2004)	Position
Sweden (Hitlistan)	71
UK Singles (OCC)	72

=== Decade-end charts ===
Decade-end chart performance for "Leave Right Now"
Chart (2000–2009)	Position
UK Singles (OCC)	67

== Certifications ==
Certifications for "Leave Right Now"
Region	Certification	Certified units/sales
United Kingdom (BPI)	Platinum	622,000

== Release history ==
Release history for "Leave Right Now"
Region	Date	Format	Label(s)	Ref.
United Kingdom	24 November 2003	CD	RCA; BMG; 19; S	
Australia	8 March 2004	CD	RCA; BMG; 19; S	

== Cover versions ==
- In 2005, "Leave Right Now" was parodied by Mario Rosenstock for the radio show Gift Grub, whose identically titled version poked fun at Roy Keane's controversial departure from Manchester United and his falling-out with Alex Ferguson. Rosenstock's version also reached number one on the Irish Singles Chart.
- In 2005, "Leave Right Now" was covered in French by Pierrick Lilliu as "La même erreur" on his 2005 debut album, Besoin d'espace.
- In 2005, actor Peter Gallagher recorded a version for his album 7 Days in Memphis.
- In 2013, Australian artist Anthony Callea recorded a version for his album, Thirty.
- In 2018, English musical theatre actor Lee Mead recorded a version for his album 10 Year Anniversary.
