= Tant besoin de toi =

Single by Marc Antoine

from the album Comme il se doit
- Released: March 14, 2008
- Recorded: 2018
- Length: 3:38
- Label: Hostile
- Songwriter(s): Marc Antoine
- Producer(s): Marc Antoine; Sonny Black

Marc Antoine singles chronology
"Triste novembre" (2006)	"Tant besoin de toi" (2008)	"Comme il se doit" (2008)

Music video
- Tant besoin de toi on YouTube

"Tant besoin de toi" is a song by French singer Marc Antoine, released on March 14, 2008, as him debut, Comme il se doit album.

== Charts ==
Chart (2008)	Peak position
Belgium (Ultratip Bubbling Under Wallonia)	4
France (SNEP)	4
