= Dumè =

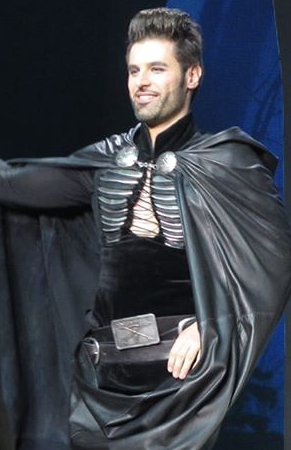
- Dumè in Robin des Bois (2014)

Background information
- Born: November 24, 1981 (age 44); Marseille, France
- Origin: France
- Genres: Chanson, French pop
- Label: My Major Company

Dominique Mattei (born in 1981 in Marseille, France) better known by the stage name Dumè is a French singer, composer and actor.

== Biography ==
As an adolescent, he studied composing, singing and playing guitar at the Marseilles conservatory.

He opened for concerts by Pascal Obispo and signed as a composer for Atletico music. He wrote songs for Johnny Hallyday, Faudel, Natasha Saint-Pier, Louisy Joseph amongst others and partnered with Lionel Florence writing for others. In November 2009, Dominique Mattei announced that he was taking the name Dumè and was preparing his first album through financing from My Major Company.

In 2012, Dumè was also featured in Génération Goldman tribute project to Jean-Jaques Goldman singing Il suffira d'un signe alongside Merwan Rim, Amaury Vassili and Baptiste Giabiconi. In 2013, he is taking part in the French musical adaptation of Robin hood titled Robin des Bois playing the role of Vaisey, the Sheriff of Nottingham. He also performs in the play Notting Hill Nottingham as a solo and Devenir quelqu'un with M. Pokora (in the role of Robin Hood).

His first album solo is edited in 2014 : La moitié du chemin.

== Discography ==
Singles

- 2010 : Je ne sais rien faire
- 2012 : La moitié du chemin, duet with Judith
- 2014 : Maman m'avait dit

Album

- 2014 : La moitié du chemin

Appearances

- 2012 : Il suffira d'un signe (Merwan Rim, Amaury Vassili, Baptiste Giabiconi and Dumè in Génération Goldman)

== Musical Theatre ==
- 2013 : Robin des Bois, Vaisey, the Sheriff of Nottingham
  - Notting Hill Nottingham (Dumè in Robin des Bois)
  - Devenir quelqu'un (Dumè & M. Pokora in Robin des Bois)
  - Y renoncer un jour (Dumè in "Robin des Bois")
