= Crying on the Bathroom Floor =

Studio album by Will Young
- Released: 6 August 2021
- Length: 45:28
- Label: Cooking Vinyl
- Producer: Richard X

Will Young chronology
Lexicon (2019)	Crying on the Bathroom Floor (2021)	20 Years: The Greatest Hits (2022)

Singles from Crying on the Bathroom Floor
- 1. "Daniel" Released: 26 April 2021; 2. "Elizabeth Taylor" Released: 28 May 2021; 3. "Crying on the Bathroom Floor" Released: 8 July 2021

Crying on the Bathroom Floor is the eighth studio album by British singer Will Young. It was released on 6 August 2021 through Cooking Vinyl. An album of cover versions of songs by female artists, it includes the singles "Daniel" (originally recorded by Bat for Lashes), "Elizabeth Taylor" (originally by Clare Maguire) and the title track "Crying on the Bathroom Floor" (originally by MUNA).

== Background ==
Following his previous album, Lexicon, released in 2019, Young wanted to highlight female artists he admired, saying, "After 18 years of recording and performing a lot of original material, I loved the idea of creating an album that celebrates some of the modern female artists I so admire in pop. In today’s times it's so much easier and accepted to occupy other genders, ideas and explore new avenues. I wanted to understand what it might be like to sing their lyrics; a song about a boy called Daniel; crying on the bathroom floor, feeling like Elizabeth Taylor. This is not a covers album as such, well certainly not in the standard way. I wanted to bring songs from female artists who I admire into a new arena. I wanted to work with Richard X again and create a true pop record."

== Singles ==
The album's lead single, "Daniel" was released on 26 April 2021. The single peaked at number 29 on the UK Singles Downloads Chart. An official music video was released on the same day.

"Elizabeth Taylor" was released as the second single on 28 May 2021.

The album's third and final single was the title track, "Crying on the Bathroom Floor" and was released on 8 July 2021. It peaked at number 29 on the UK Singles Downloads Chart. "Crying on the Bathroom Floor"'s official music video was released on the same day.

== Critical reception ==
Professional ratings
Review scores
Source	Rating
Evening Standard	3/5 stars
The Independent	3/5 stars
musicOMH	4/5 stars

David Smyth from Evening Standard found that "leftfield pop artists such as Muna, Lykke Li and Sky Ferreira deserve the wider attention they may get from Young making their music more Radio 2 friendly. In most cases, with the help of regular production collaborator Richard X, he's made electronic originals sound a bit more organic, with lots of piano, a bit of guitar and his high, sad, soulful voice [...] If this album serves to direct his mainstream fanbase towards the superior originals, it will have done a worthwhile job. Roisin O'Connor remarked that "the fact he is able to celebrate his sexuality now means these songs transcend the bog-standard cover version and become something far more moving [...] It's testament to Young’s emotional maturity, along with his pop savvy, that this does stand as an album in its own right."

== Track listing ==
All tracks produced by Richard X.

Crying on the Bathroom Floor track listing
No.	Title	Writer(s)	Original artist	Length
1.	"Daniel"	Natasha Khan	Bat for Lashes	4:37
2.	"Crying on the Bathroom Floor"	Muna	Muna	4:20
3.	"Till There's Nothing Left"	Camaron Ochs; Jeff Bhasker; Tyler Johnson; Hillary Lindsey	Cam	3:44
4.	"Indestructible"	Robyn Carlsson; Klas Åhlund	Robyn	3:44
5.	"Strong"	Hannah Reid; Dot Major; Daniel Rothman	London Grammar	5:03
6.	"I Follow Rivers"	Lykke Li; Björn Yttling; Rick Nowels	Lykke Li	4:39
7.	"Everything Is Embarrassing"	Sky Ferreira; Ariel Rechtshaid; Devonté Hynes	Sky Ferreira	3:52
8.	"Losing You"	Solange Knowles; Hynes	Solange	2:55
9.	"Missing"	Tracey Thorn; Ben Watt	Everything but the Girl	4:16
10.	"Elizabeth Taylor"	Clare Maguire; Lincoln Barrett	Clare Maguire	4:16
Total length:				45:28

== Charts ==
Chart performance for Crying on the Bathroom Floor
Chart (2021)	Peak position
UK Albums (Official Charts)	3
UK Independent Albums (Official Charts)	1

== Release history ==
Crying on the Bathroom Floor release history
Region	Date	Format(s)	Label	Ref.
Various	6 August 2021	CD; digital download; streaming	Cooking Vinyl	
