= Robin des Bois =

- Ne renoncez jamais
- Music: Various
- Lyrics: Various
- Basis: Robin Hood
- Productions: Eleonore De Galard; Gilbert Coullier; Roberto Ciurleo; Laurent Benhamou; EMI Group

Robin des Bois (full title Robin des Bois: Ne renoncez jamais) is a French musical with mise en scène by Michel Laprise and text and music by Patrice Guirao and Lionel Florence. It premiered on 26 September 2013 at Palais des congrès de Paris and played until 5 January 2014 with French singer M. Pokora in the role of Robin Hood.

== Synopsis ==
In this amended version of Robin Hood, Marianne (in English Maid Marian) decided to end her relationship with Robin Hood. Fifteen years later, they both are leaders of their own groups, in two separated parts of the Sherwood forest. Marianne lives with Adrien, the boy she had with Robin, but Robin doesn't know about him. Adrien, now 15, falls in love with the daughter of Shérif de Nottingham (in English Sheriff of Nottingham, the avowed enemy of Robin) and she comes to lives with him in the forest. After another attack from the sheriff's army, Marianne requests Robin's help to save her group and their houses. When the sheriff realises that Adrien is Robin's son, he decides to imprison the young boy, despite the feelings his daughter has towards him. Robin is captured too, but is freed by his friends. He then launches a rescue operation with the help of his followers and notably Petit Jean (Little John) and Frère Tuck (Friar Tuck) played by Nyco Lilliu. They win the final battle, but Little John is killed. They mourn him before King Richard Lionheart comes back to England and knights Robin.

== Personnel ==
Presentation

- Gilbert Coullier
- Roberto Ciurleo
- RDB-P

Mise en scène

- Michel Laprise

Production

- Gilbert Coullier Productions

Composition

- David Hallyday
- Fred Château
- Mathieu Mendès
- Corneille
- Shaka Ponk
- Coyle Girelli
- Stanislas
- John Mamann

Costumes

- Stéphane Rolland

Cast

(Roles as in French production)

- M. Pokora as Robin des Bois (Robin Hood)
- Stéphanie Bédard as Marianne
- Nyco Lilliu as Frère Tuck (Friar Tuck)
- Caroline Costa as Bédélia
- Marc Antoine as Petit Jean (Little John)
- Dumè as Vaisey, le shérif de Nottingham (Sheriff of Nottingham)
- Sacha Tran as Adrien

== Soundtrack ==
Robin des Bois - Ne Renoncez Jamais

Soundtrack album by Various Artists
- Released: 22 March 2013
- Genre: Soundtrack
- Label: Capitol Records / EMI

Robin des Bois soundtrack (longer title Robin des Bois - Ne Renoncez Jamais) for the musical Robin des Bois was released on Capitol Records / EMI on 22 March 2013 and entered the SNEP official French Albums Chart in its first week of release.

The album is being released in two versions. The standard edition and the digipack limited edition.

=== Track list ===
1. M. Pokora – "Le jour qui se rêve" (3:45)
2. Dumè & M. Pokora – "Devenir quelqu'un" (3:40)
3. Stéphanie Bédard & M. Pokora – "Tes blessures" (4:43)
4. Nyco Lilliu, Marc Antoine & M. Pokora – "À nous" (3:59)
5. Caroline Costa – "J'ai dit oui" (3:59)
6. Nyco Lilliu – "Un monde à changer" (3:25)
7. M. Pokora – "Si l'amour existe" (3:50)
8. Stéphanie Bédard – "La flèche ou la cible" (3:45)
9. Sacha Tran – "Quinze ans à peine" (3:50)
10. Marc Antoine – "Lui sait qui je suis" (3:58)
11. Caroline Costa & Sacha Tran – "Laissez-nous vivre" (3:33)
12. Dumè – "Notting Hill Nottingham" (3:11)
13. Caroline Costa & Sacha Tran – "Terre" (4:03)

=== Charts ===
==== Weekly charts ====
Chart (2013)	Peak position
Belgian Albums (Ultratop Wallonia)	4
French Albums (SNEP)	3
Swiss Albums (Schweizer Hitparade)	33

==== Year-end charts ====
Chart (2013)	Position
Belgian Albums (Ultratop Wallonia)	27
French Albums (SNEP)	9

Chart (2014)	Position
Belgian Albums (Ultratop Wallonia)	38
French Albums (SNEP)	76

=== Singles ===
- In September 2012, an initial single was launched titled "Un monde à changer" by Nyco Lilliu accompanied by a music video.
- In February 2013, a second single from the show was released titled "Le jour qui se rêve".

Year	Single	Peak positions		
Year	Single	BEL Wa	FRA	SUI
2012	"Un monde à changer" (Nyco Lilliu)	27	114	–
2012	"Le jour qui se rêve" (M. Pokora)	47	22	–
2013	"À nous" (M. Pokora, Nyco Lilliu & Marc Antoine)	–	169	–
2013	"J'attendais" (M. Pokora)	–	131	–
