= Will Young =

British singer and actor (born 1979)

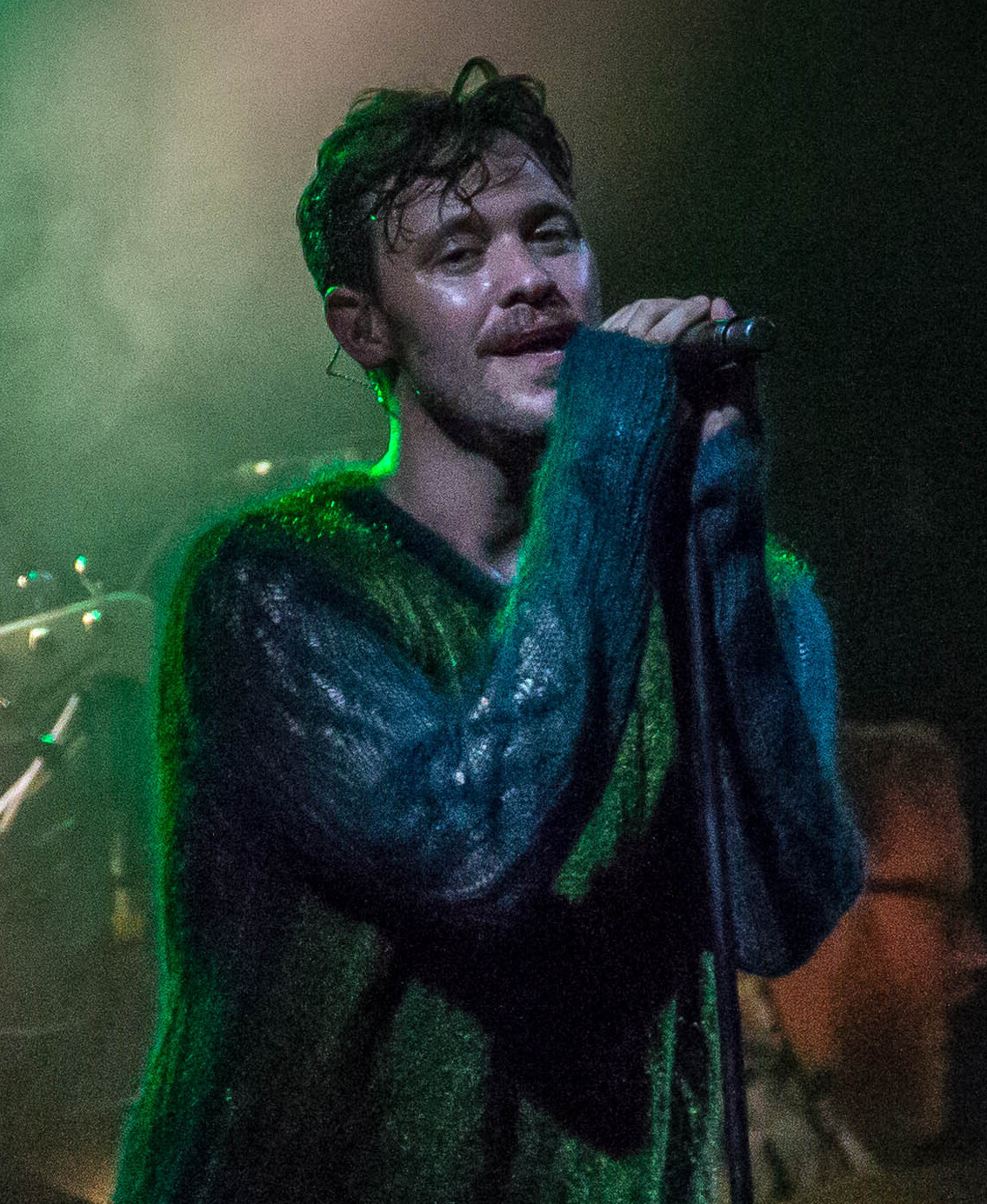
- Young performing at Glastonbury in 2016
- Born: William Robert Young; 20 January 1979 (age 47); Wokingham, Berkshire, England
- Education: University of Exeter
- Occupations: Singer; songwriter; actor
- Years active: 2001–present
- Musical career
- Genres: Pop; electro
- Instrument: Vocals
- Labels: 19; Jive; Island; Cooking Vinyl
- Website: willyoung.co.uk

William Robert Young (born 20 January 1979) is an English singer, songwriter and actor. He came to prominence after winning the 2002 inaugural series of the ITV talent contest Pop Idol, making him the first winner of the worldwide Idol franchise. His double A-sided debut single "Anything Is Possible" / "Evergreen" was released two weeks after the show's finale and became the fastest-selling debut single in the UK. Young also came in fifth place in World Idol performing the single "Light My Fire" written by the band the Doors.

In his late teenage years, Young began studying politics at the University of Exeter before moving to London, where he studied musical theatre at the Arts Educational Schools in Chiswick. Young put his studies on hold in late 2001 to become a contestant on Pop Idol. After winning the competition the following year, he released his debut album From Now On (2002) which went straight to number one. Friday's Child (2003) followed and enjoyed greater success, eventually going platinum five times in the UK and spawning three top five singles on the UK singles chart. His following albums Keep On (2005), Let It Go (2008) and Echoes (2011) also went multi-platinum and 85% Proof (2015) became his fourth UK number-one album on the UK Albums Chart. His albums Lexicon (2019), Crying on the Bathroom Floor (2021) and Light It Up (2024) reached number 2, 3 and 5, in the UK Album Charts, respectively.

Young's albums have spawned many songs that have achieved top ten positions in the UK, four of which went to the number one spot. Young has also undertaken numerous concert tours, and has accumulated multiple honours, including two Brit Awards from 12 nominations, and the estimated worldwide sale of over eight million albums, as of 2009.

Alongside his music career, Young has acted in film, on stage and in television. For his performance in the 2013 London revival of the musical Cabaret, he was nominated for the Laurence Olivier Award for Best Actor in a Leading Role in a Musical. He has also participated in philanthropy and released books Anything is Possible (2002), On Camera, Off Duty (2004), his autobiography Funny Peculiar (2012), To be a Gay Man (2020), and The A–Z of Wellbeing (2022). In January 2022, he appeared in the third series of The Masked Singer as "Lionfish" and in May issued the compilation album 20 Years: The Greatest Hits.

== Early life and education ==
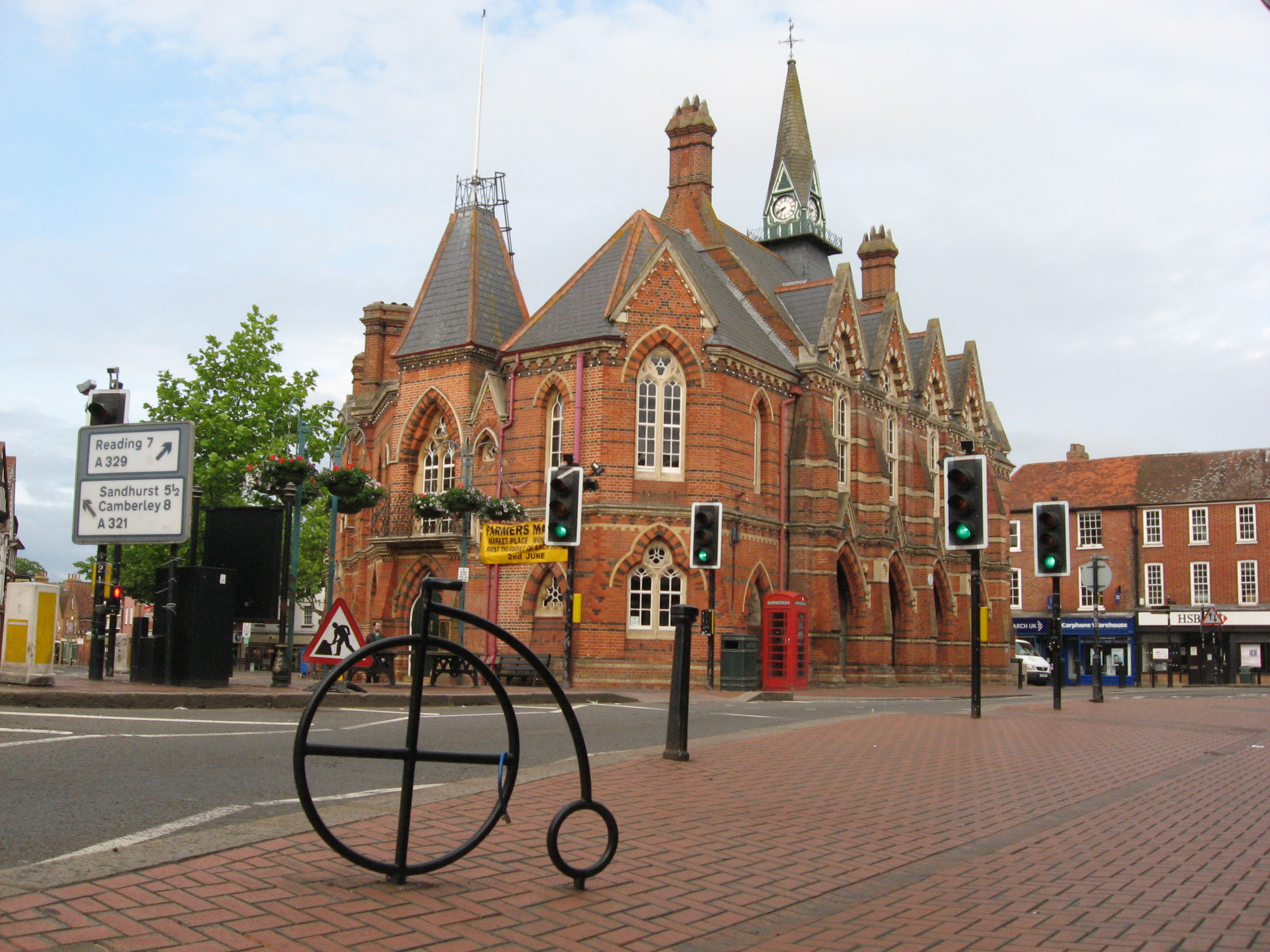
Young was born in the English market town of Wokingham

Young was born on 20 January 1979 in Wokingham, Berkshire, and is the second-oldest child of Robin Young, a company director of an engineering firm, and Annabel Young (née Griffith), a plant nursery gardener. Born six weeks premature, he was ten minutes older than his twin brother, Rupert who died in July 2020. He also has an older sister Emma.

Young's grandfather, Digby Aretas Young (1916 - 1966), was a flight lieutenant in the Royal Air Force, and features in Thomas D. Calnan's memoir. His great-great-great-grandfather was Sir Henry Young, fifth Governor of South Australia, later first Governor of Tasmania. His great-great-great-great-grandfather was Colonel Sir Aretas William Young, who, in 1795 at seventeen years old, joined the British Army and served in Ireland and Egypt before fighting in the Peninsular War. Aretas was later stationed in Trinidad and eventually took charge of the Trinidadian government, before moving to Demerara where he was appointed Protector of Slaves. Aretas became the sixth Governor of Prince Edward Island in 1831, and three years later was knighted by King William IV. The 1st Baron Despenser is Young's 18-times great-grandfather. Edward I was his 20-times great-grandfather. Edward was the great-grandson of William the Conqueror.

Young was brought up in Hungerford, West Berkshire, and was initially educated at Kingsbury Hill School in Marlborough, Wiltshire, before attending Horris Hill Preparatory School, Newbury, between the ages of eight and thirteen. His first appearance on stage was at the age of four when he played a fir tree in a school production and had one line to speak. At Horris Hill, Young was head chorister in the school choir, and at the age of nine he learned how to play the piano. Young recalls that at Horris Hill, pupils were taught that they were more privileged than pupils from state schools, and that one day he wrote a letter stating, "I must pass common entrance to take me to public school, otherwise I'll be going to state school and everyone will be very disappointed." At thirteen, Young and his brother were enrolled as boarders at the public school Wellington College in Crowthorne, Berkshire. Young appeared in several school productions and often gave speeches in assembly, despite later admitting that he never felt completely comfortable being the centre of attention.

It was during this period that he became interested in sports and for a time he dreamed of competing in the Olympic Games in the 400-metre sprint, which he could run in under fifty seconds – the Olympic average is forty-three seconds. He became captain of the school's basketball and athletics teams, and also represented the school in the triple jump, long jump, football and rugby. The only sport he says he felt uncomfortable playing was cricket.

Young left school with ten GCSEs, but achieved disappointing A-Level results and had to enrol in d'Overbroeck's College, Oxford, to re-sit his exams. He took a part-time job as a waiter at the Grand Café in Oxford, and became interested in environmental issues and local campaigning, joining a group called the Eco Society. He passed his A-Levels the second time, earning As in Politics and Ancient History, and a B in English. In 1998 Young began studying politics at the University of Exeter, choosing the subject because, "I thought I should know more about what was going on in my country." He also took women's studies at university and considers himself a feminist. His interest in performing arts continued, and he joined a theatre group called Footlights where he eventually landed the lead role of Curly in their production of Oklahoma! "I really enjoyed it and doing that gave me a lot of confidence", he later said of the show. He also took a work experience position at Sony Records to gain insight into the music industry. Other work included runway and photographic modelling, gardening, tearing labels off T-shirts in a clothing factory, and being a waiter. He graduated in 2001 with a 2:2 bachelor's degree. After leaving university, Young knew that he wanted to be a professional singer, but wanted training and experience. In September 2001 he became a student at the Arts Educational Schools, in Chiswick, London.

== Career ==
=== 1999–2001: Early auditions ===
In 1999 during his second year at university, Young watched an episode of This Morning and learned that the show was holding a competition to find members for a new boy band. He mailed the producers an audition tape and received a letter back from the show telling him he had been selected as one of seventy-five competitors, and that he had to appear in London for an off-camera audition. The 75 auditionees were whittled down to 9 finalists including Young, who were then invited to perform on the show. On 29 May 1999, Young appeared on the programme and performed a short rendition of the Jackson 5 song, "I'll Be There", in front of a panel of judges that included Simon Cowell, an artists and repertoire executive at BMG, and Kate Thornton, a former editor of Smash Hits, turned television presenter. One week later, Young was selected into the boy band alongside three other competitors. They were Lee Ryan who later joined the boy band Blue, Declan Bennett who joined the boy band Point Break, signed to Danielle Barnett, the current lead singer of Urban Cookie Collective and Music Manager who contacted him directly following the This Morning audition, and Andy Scott-Lee who went on to compete in the second series of Pop Idol. Cowell said of the group, "We've tried to find people with star quality and these guys can sing and dance", but the band failed to find any success and it soon dis-banded. Young's next audition was at the Guildhall in London to be a jazz singer, but he accidentally arrived on the wrong date.

=== 2001–2002: Pop Idol ===
Simon Cowell, a judge and one of the executive producers of Pop Idol, was highly critical of Young's audition

On 20 June 2001, one of Young's university classmates showed him an advertisement in the News of the World for auditionees of Pop Idol, a planned nationwide televised talent show to find a solo pop artist in a similar way that Popstars had created the pop band Hear'Say the previous year. The winner was guaranteed a £1 million recording contract with BMG and representation by 19 Management. He printed out an application form from the website, filled it out and posted it on 28 June. On 7 August 2001, he received a reply which told him he had been accepted for an audition at ExCeL London on 5 September 2001. On the day of the audition, Young performed Aretha Franklin's "Until You Come Back to Me (That's What I'm Gonna Do)" in front of an assistant producer, and was deemed good enough to be given a second audition two days later. For his second audition, Young sang "Blame It on the Boogie" by the Jacksons in front of a show producer and won a place to the third round to perform before the show's judges: Simon Cowell; Nicki Chapman, a Popstars judge who also worked as a publicist at 19 Entertainment, the company that was producing Pop Idol; Pete Waterman, a music producer who had written or produced twenty-one singles that had charted at Number One in the UK Singles Chart, 200 Top Tens, and sold over 500 million records for the artists such as Kylie Minogue, Rick Astley, Bananarama, Steps and Westlife; and Neil "Dr Fox" Fox, a disc jockey who presented the drivetime show on Capital FM and the nationally syndicated Pepsi Chart. He was the final contestant the judges saw, and after a day of watching mostly poor performances they were not in the best spirits. Again, Young performed "Blame It on the Boogie", but the judges thought his overall performance was merely average. Chapman told him that his dance moves had let him down, but his vocal was good. Fox described him as cheesy, Waterman was unimpressed by his stage presence and image – Young was wearing baggy and faded jeans, scuffed shoes and his grandfather's jumper which was stained with egg yolk – but conceded that his voice was "nice". Despite their uncertainty, however, they advanced him through to the next round. The following week, auditions were held at the Criterion Theatre, and Young sang "All or Nothing" by O-Town, the Drifters' "Up on the Roof" and "Fast Love" by George Michael. Still not completely convinced by his performances, he was made to wait in the "Maybe" room until the judges decided to send him through to the Final 50.

The first episode of Pop Idol was broadcast on 6 October 2001 on ITV, and Young's audition aired on the third show on 20 October 2001. The next round of the competition was split into five heats that aired every Saturday between 3 November 2001 and 8 December 2001. Each show featured ten of the fifty competitors singing one song in the Pop Idol studios in front of the judges and an audience, but unlike previous rounds, the viewing public decided who would advance to the next round by interactive televoting voting using their telephones, the Red Button on digital television remote controls, and the Pop Idol website. The two singers with the highest number of votes in each heat advanced to the final rounds of the competition. Young competed in Heat 4, broadcast on 24 November, and sang a jazz/lounge interpretation of "Light My Fire" by the Doors. Judges Chapman, Fox and Waterman were all enthusiastic about his performance, but Cowell was unimpressed and called it "distinctly average", adding, "I just thought it was totally normal. In the context of the show I honestly didn't think it was good enough." The other judges and contestants all expressed shock at his comments, and Young responded, telling Cowell that while he was entitled to his opinion, it was wrong.

Young: "I love disagreeing with Simon because I do it every week, but all of us [the contestants] have been dying to say things to you.—"
Cowell: "Well I just spoke how I felt, so you do the same."
Young: [Interrupting Cowell] "Sorry, can I finish? Thank you. It's nice that you've given opinions in this show. In previous shows you haven't, you've just projected insults and it's been terrible to watch... It is your opinion, but I don't agree with it. I don't think it was average. I don't think you could ever call that average, but it is your opinion and I respect that, so thank you very much."

— Exchange between Will Young and Simon Cowell, after Cowell criticised Young's performance of "Light My Fire". "Open Auditions 5". Pop Idol. ITV. 20 October 2001. No. 5, series 1.

This incident has often been cited as the moment when Young's pop career truly began, standing out to viewers and endeared himself to them. It appeared that the voting audience agreed with Young and disagreed with Cowell, because he was voted through to the next round, in first place, with 41.5% of the overall vote. During Young's next appearance on the show on 15 December 2001, Cowell stated that he had previously made a "huge mistake", and that Young had conducted himself with a dignity that had humbled him. Young later stated that his proudest moment of the entire competition was this incident.

Young easily progressed through each subsequent round by performing jazz, lounge and soul versions of songs such as "Wives and Lovers", "Ain't No Sunshine" and "Beyond the Sea". In the first four weeks of the Live Finals, he received the highest percentage of votes. In weeks five, six and seven, he received the second highest percentage of votes, losing out on first place to Gareth Gates each time. In the Semi-final, competing against Gates and Darius Danesh, Young again received the most votes (39.8%). Gates received 39.3% of the votes and won the other place in the Grand Final, while Danesh received 20.9% of the votes and was eliminated from the competition.

Throughout the following week, Young and Gates embarked on separate whistle-stop tours of the United Kingdom in large tour buses adorned with their faces, in an attempt to canvass for votes. In election-style campaigns, they made numerous radio and television appearances, were interviewed in magazines, national and local newspapers, and met and performed for their fans. Celebrities such as Noel Gallagher, Robbie Williams, Posh and Becks, Kylie Minogue, Myleene Klass, Michelle Collins, S Club 7 and Jenny Frost announced their support for Young, while Gates was backed by Duncan James, Natasha Hamilton, Richard and Judy, Westlife, Faye Tozer, Denise Van Outen, Ben Adams, Neil Tennant, Andrew Lloyd Webber, Claire Richards, Boy George, Ricky Gervais and Francis Rossi. The media pitted Young and Gates against each other, publishing false news articles claiming that the two contestants were bitter rivals and their parents were bickering and fighting backstage, stories which both camps denied. Although for a brief moment earlier in the series Young was favoured to win, bookmakers gave Gates better odds on the eve of the Grand Final, pointing to his angelic voice, good looks and displays of emotion that appealed to a younger audience, compared with Young's soulful crooning and maturity appealing to housewives and intellectuals. Gates was given various odds of 1/5, 2/9 and 2/7, while Young's odds were quoted at 100/30, 11/4, 3/1 and 5/2 at different times in the week.

On 9 February 2002, 13.34 million viewers watched Young and Gates battle each other in the Grand Final for the title of "Pop Idol". Both acts sang "Anything Is Possible" and "Evergreen", which were to be released as a double A-side single by the winner. Young also sang "Light My Fire" a second time as his favourite performance from the series. Over the two-and-a-half hours that the voting lines were open, 8.7 million votes were registered, setting a new world record. However, some voters complained that their votes had not been registered and that ITV, British Telecom and Telescope (the company responsible for operating the phone system) had not prepared well enough for the volume of calls because the system crashed at one point during the evening. It was also alleged that the phonelines had been fixed and they were involved in vote rigging. Nevertheless, Young was announced the winner of the competition after receiving 4.6 million (53.1%) votes, just 500,000 more than Gates. Young's shock at hearing the news was obvious to viewers as his jaw dropped and he clasped his hands to his face. "When he [Ant McPartlin] said what the votes were, I thought, 'I am second, and I have lost by that much. Oh well, that's not bad'," Young recalled. "When I heard I'd won ... I felt like I'd been hit. I stepped backwards. I could not believe it." In 2011, Young described Pop Idol as "a huge starting point and ... the best ever experience for me, ever."

==== Pop Idol performances and results ====
Week	Theme	Song performed	Original artist	Result	Percentage of public votes
Audition	Idol's Choice	"Blame It on the Boogie"	The Jacksons	Advanced	N/A
London Rounds	Day 1, first performance	"All or Nothing"	O-Town	Advanced	N/A
London Rounds	Day 1, second performance	"Up on the Roof"	The Drifters	Advanced	N/A
London Rounds	Day 2	"Fastlove"	George Michael	Advanced	N/A
Top 50	Semi-finals	"Light My Fire"	The Doors/José Feliciano	Safe (1st)	41.5%
Top 10	Pop idols	"Until You Come Back to Me"	Aretha Franklin	Safe (1st)	27.3%
Top 9	Christmas songs	"Winter Wonderland"	Richard Himber and his Hotel Carelton Orchestra	Safe (1st)	22.6%
Top 8	Burt Bacharach music	"Wives and Lovers"	Jack Jones	Safe (1st)	21.3%
Top 7	Music from the movies	"Ain't No Sunshine"	Bill Withers	Safe (1st)	29.8%
Top 6	Songs of ABBA	"The Name of the Game"	ABBA	Safe (2nd)	25.2%
Top 5	Big band night	"We Are in Love"	Harry Connick, Jr.	Safe (2nd)	24%
Top 4	Performers' choice	"Night Fever" "There Must Be an Angel (Playing with My Heart)"	Bee Gees; Eurythmics	Safe (2nd)	27.9%
Top 3	Judges' choice	"Beyond the Sea" "I Get the Sweetest Feeling"	Bobby Darin; Jackie Wilson	Safe (1st)	39.8%
Top 2	Idol single (A-side); Idol's favourite Idol single (AA side)	"Anything is Possible" "Light My Fire" "Evergreen"	Will Young; The Doors/José Feliciano; Westlife	Winner	53.1%

=== 2002–2003: From Now On ===
Young's first single was a double A-side featuring Westlife's song "Evergreen" and "Anything Is Possible", a new song written for the winner of the show by Chris Braide and Cathy Dennis. In March 2002, this became the fastest-selling debut in UK chart history, selling 403,027 copies on its day of release (1,108,659 copies in its first week). It went on to sell over 1.7 million copies, and on the official list of the all-time best-selling singles in the UK issued later that year, it was ranked eleventh. In 2008, Official Charts Company released the Top 40 Biggest Selling Singles of the 21st century (so far) in which Young's version of Evergreen topped the chart. On 31 December 2009, Radio 1 confirmed that "Anything Is Possible"/"Evergreen" was the biggest selling single of the 2000s decade in the United Kingdom. This was again confirmed on 7 May 2012 when Radio 1 played a countdown of the top-selling 150 songs of the millennium so far. "Anything Is Possible" won an Ivor Novello Award for Bestselling Song of 2002.

In October 2002, Young released his debut album, From Now On, which included "Evergreen", nominated in the Best British Single category at the Brit Awards 2003, and "Anything Is Possible". It produced three singles: "Light My Fire", "The Long and Winding Road" (a duet with Gareth Gates, released as a double A-side with Gates's song "Suspicious Minds") and "Don't Let Me Down"/"You and I" (released in aid of Children in Need). He won his first BRIT Award in February 2003 as Best British Breakthrough Act. Young sang "Try Again", a song featured in Disney's 101 Dalmatians II: Patch's London Adventure, the 2003 direct-to-video sequel to Walt Disney's 1961 feature One Hundred and One Dalmatians.

=== 2003–2007: Friday's Child and Keep On ===
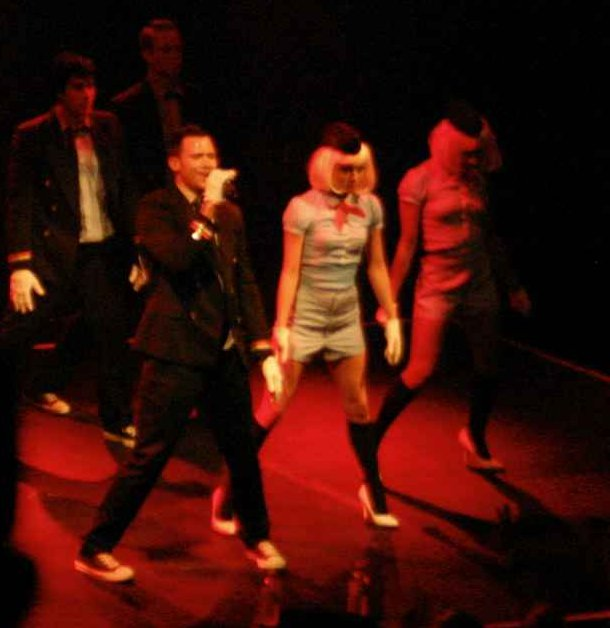
Young performing at G-A-Y, 2006

Young's second album, Friday's Child, was released in December 2003. It features the singles "Leave Right Now", nominated in the Best British single category of the past 25 years at the Brit Awards 2005 and winner of the Ivor Novello Award for Best Song Musically and Lyrically in 2004, "Your Game" (which won Young his second Brit Award in 2005 for Best British Single of the Year) and "Friday's Child" In November 2005, Young released his third album, Keep On, which included the single "All Time Love", nominated in the Best British Single category at the Brit Awards 2007. Other singles from the album were "Switch It On" and "Who Am I".

In May 2006, he sang at the Prince's Trust 30th Birthday, which took place at the Tower of London. From 12 September until 2 October 2006, Young toured the UK with his Keep On Live Tour, which included the songs taken from his album Keep On and a selection of past songs. The official merchandise range for the tour, highlighted by the press, included a "tip and strip" pen which, when turned over, reveals Young in his underpants. In October 2006, Young sang at Nitin Sawhney's concert in the BBC Electric Proms series of concerts. He followed this by performing in South Africa for Nelson Mandela's Unite of the Stars charity concerts.

In July 2007, he appeared at the Concert for Diana at the new Wembley Stadium. Young was the headline act at the Proms in the Park, which took place in Hyde Park in September 2007 as part of the Last Night of the Proms. In September 2007, Young performed at Ronnie Scott's Jazz Club with the Vanguard Big Band. Young took part in the Little Noise Sessions, a series of intimate, acoustic gigs for the learning disability charity, Mencap. He performed in November 2007 with special guests at Islington's Union Chapel.

=== 2008–2010: Let It Go and The Hits ===
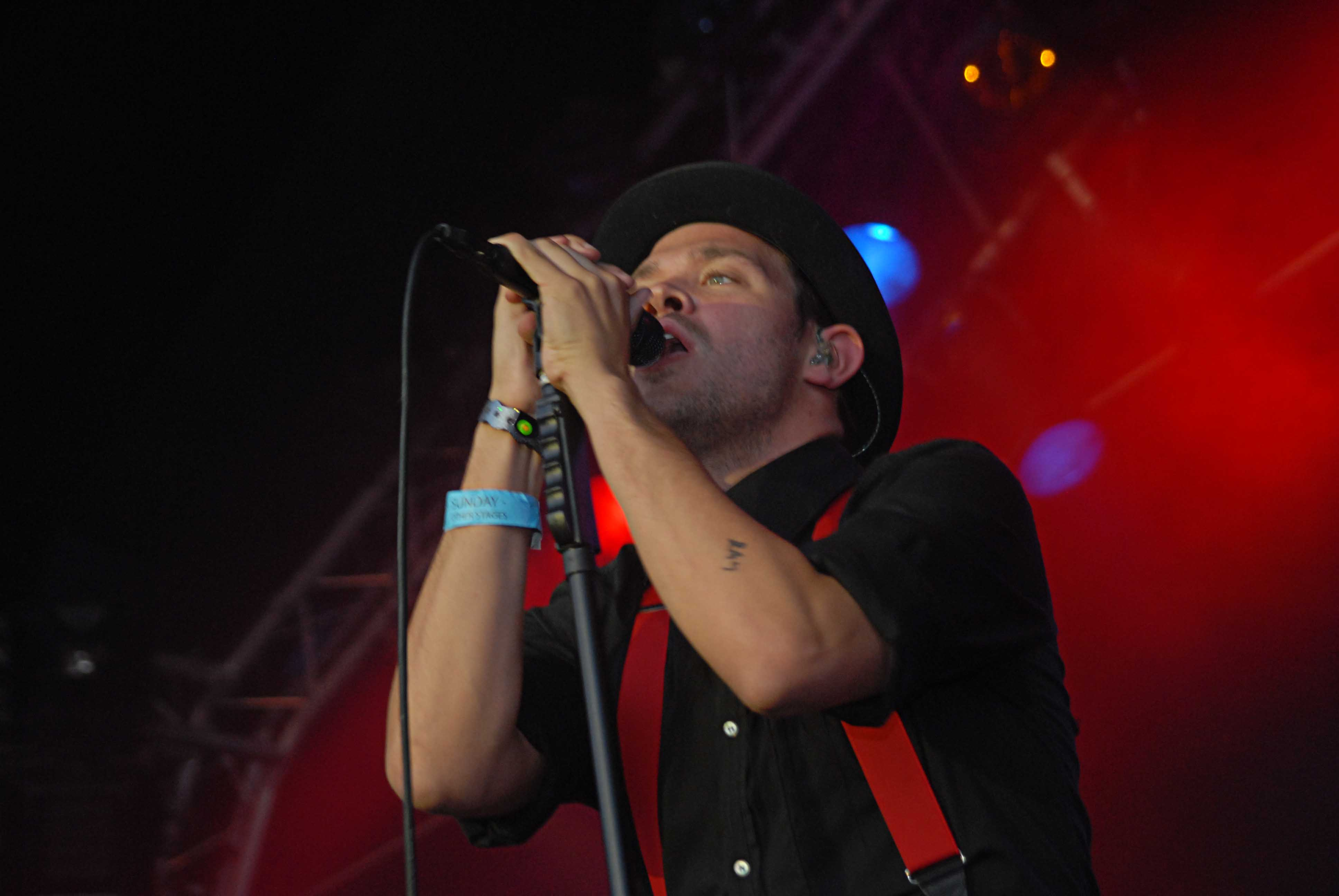
Young performing at Guilfest in 2009

On 29 September 2008, Young's fourth album, Let It Go, was released. It peaked at No.2 on the UK Albums Chart, having been preceded by the single "Changes", which was released on 15 September and peaked at No.10 in the UK Singles Chart. His next single "Grace" was released on 1 December 2008, and peaked at No.33 on the UK Singles Chart. The third single taken from the album, "Let It Go", was released on 2 March 2009 in the UK, and peaked at No.58 on the UK Singles Chart. The fourth and final single, "Tell Me the Worst", was released in the UK only, on 5 July 2009. It served as a club promo, and featured some Fred Falke remixes.

In April 2008, Young again appeared at Ronnie Scott's Jazz Club with the Vanguard Big Band. Young is to perform at various festivals during mid-2008, including Glastonbury, T in the Park in Scotland and Bestival on the Isle of Wight.

On 24 August 2008, Young appeared at the Olympic Party which took place in the Mall, London. He performed his latest single "Changes" and "I Can See Clearly Now", which was originally sung by Johnny Nash. On an interview with Digital Spy, Young revealed that he was working on a dance-pop album, which might be released in late 2009. He also confirmed that he was working with British duo Groove Armada, Superbass, who remixed his UK Top 10 single "Changes", and Gregg Alexander, who has previously worked with British pop singers Sophie Ellis-Bextor and Geri Halliwell. He also confirmed that he is working on an album covering songs by Noël Coward, which is as yet in its very early stages and he "doesn't know if it will end up". Young performed in a sell-out theatre tour, commencing on 16 November 2008 and continuing until 13 December 2008 with two dates at the Roundhouse in Camden, London.

Young was the featured singer on The X Factor on ITV1 on Saturday 1 November 2008. He also mentored the remaining series 5 contestants. On 31 December 2008, Young was featured as a guest on Elton John's Live New Year show at the O2 Arena in London along with that year's X Factor winner Alexandra Burke. He joined John on the song "Daniel". Young was one of the performers on the Live at Blackpool programme on BBC Radio 2 on Saturday 5 September 2009.

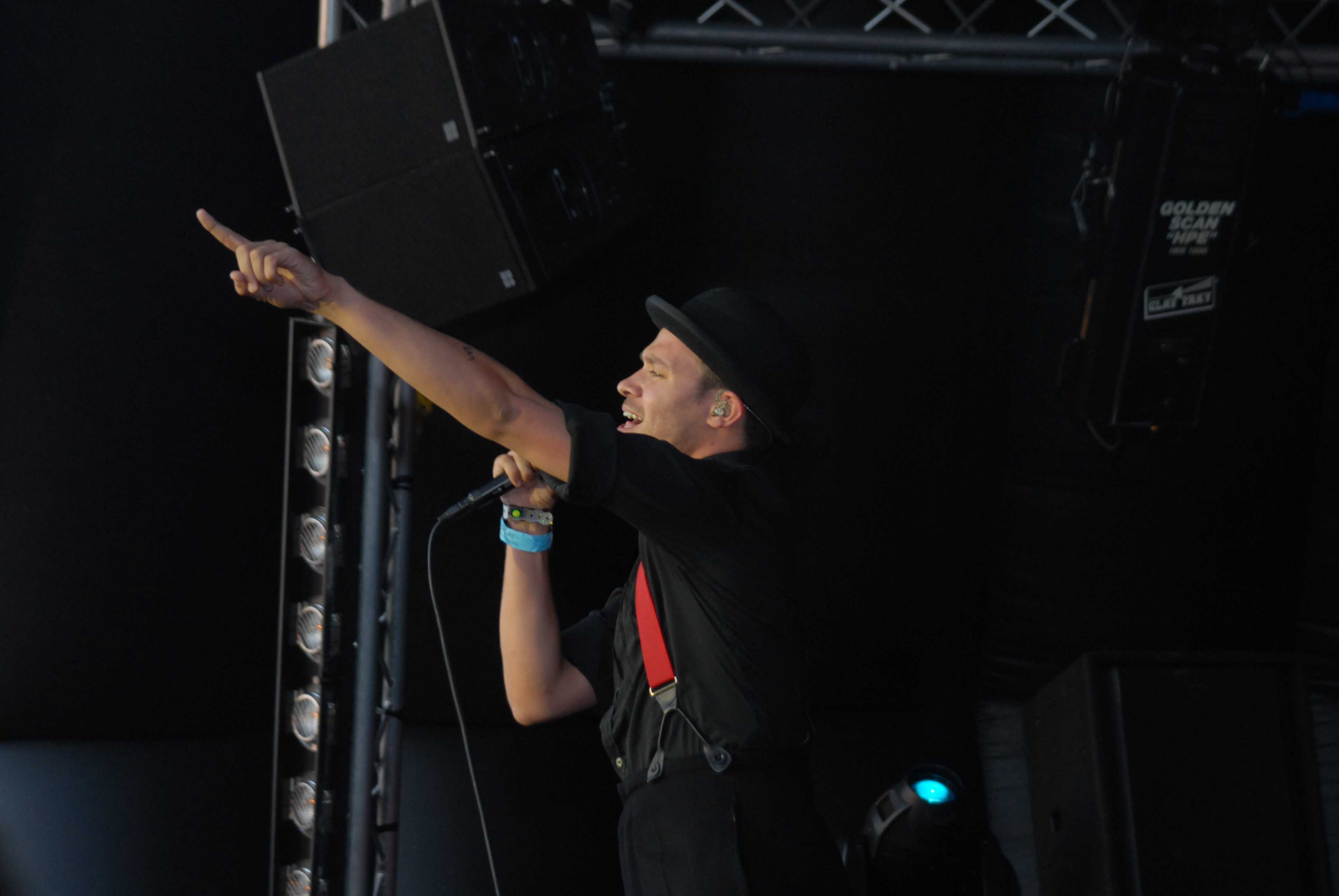
Young performing at Guilfest in 2009

Young's greatest hits collection, The Hits, was released on 16 November 2009. It included two brand new songs, one of them the single "Hopes & Fears". The album was a success on the charts, being certified Platinum by the British Phonographic Industry. In 2010, Young collaborated with Groove Armada on their album Black Light, singing vocals on the track "History". As part of his 2010 outdoor summer tour, it was announced that he would be a special guest and play on the Queen's Sandringham Estate, Sandringham in Norfolk. Pop singer Sophie Ellis-Bextor was his supporting act for his 2010 The Hits Tour.

His 2003 song "Leave Right Now" was featured on American Idol season 9 as the "departing song". He also performed live on the programme on 25 May 2010. Young gave his first US concert on 26 May at West Hollywood's Ultra Suede nightclub. He was also featured on the cover of the US magazine Instinct.

Young was told by someone at the record company to re-record his hit single "Leave Right Now" because he sounded too gay on the track. He didn't realize this but he was made to re-record the song until the record executives were satisfied with it.

=== 2011–2016: Echoes, record label change and 85% Proof ===
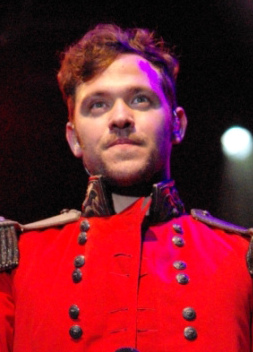
Young performing at Castle Concerts at Rochester Castle Gardens, 2011

In early 2011, Young tweeted teaser clips of tracks from his new album, Echoes, which was subsequently released on 22 August 2011 and entered the UK Albums Chart at number one on 29 August 2011 making it Young's first number one album since Friday's Child in 2003. The first single "Jealousy" premiered on BBC Radio 2, between 9.00am-12noon, Monday 11 July 2011. The single was released on 21 August 2011, preceding the album by 1 day with the single peaking at No.5. A Night with...Will Young was aired two days before the release of Echoes on ITV1 presented by Kate Thornton charting all of Young's greatest hits plus performing a few new tracks from the album. Young appeared on the third episode of The Jonathan Ross Show performing "Hearts on Fire" from Echoes to further promote the album. Young undertook a 23 date Echoes Tour in the UK including 2 nights at London's Shepherd's Bush Empire in Autumn 2011. The second single from Echoes was "Come On" released in November 2011, with the accompanying video featuring Young performing at a dog show. It was confirmed that Young would appear as one of the four judges on the first series of the singing competition series The Voice UK although on 12 December 2011 it was reported that Young had been replaced by Danny O'Donoghue at the last minute. He performed a special Christmas concert at the London Palladium in December as the final night of his 2011 performances. The following day it was announced that he would be undertaking summer shows as part of the Forestry Commission's summer concert programme, also at Cornbury Festival. 2012 singles releases were "Losing Myself" and "I Just Want a Lover" with accompanying videos.

On 8 November 2012, it was announced Young had left his record company after being with them since winning Pop Idol over ten years ago and signed with Island Records.

On Good Morning Britain, Young announced that he was recording his sixth studio album. On 25 March 2015, he announced on his Instagram account that the title of the new album will be 85% Proof. It was released on 25 May.

The final single from 85% Proof was "What the World Needs Now", written by Burt Bacharach, which he released towards the end of 2015 as part of WWF's campaign to raise awareness for declining wildlife populations across the globe.

=== 2019–2021: Lexicon and Crying on the Bathroom Floor ===
Young's album Lexicon was released on 21 June. Young also released the lead single "All the Songs" from the album the same day and announced he would be embarking on a tour in October 2019 in support of the album. Young had stated in an interview he had no intentions of releasing any more records as he was focusing on acting and his podcast series, however after going into the studio with friend and producer Richard X, the lead single was recorded and the album naturally followed.

On 26 March 2021 Young announced the release of his eighth studio album Crying on the Bathroom Floor, which was released on 6 August 2021. Following the release, Young said: "I loved the idea of creating an album that celebrates some of the modern female artists I so admire in pop. In today's times it's so much easier and accepted to occupy other genders, ideas and explore new avenues. I wanted to understand what it might be like to sing their lyrics. A song about a boy called Daniel; crying on the bathroom floor, feeling like Elizabeth Taylor. I wanted to bring songs from female artists who I admire into a new arena. I wanted to work with Richard X again and create a true pop record." "Daniel", the lead single taken from the album, was released on 26 April 2021, with the official video released on the same day. The second song to be lifted from the album was "Elizabeth Taylor", a cover of a Clare Maguire track which was released on 28 May. The title track (a cover of the 2017 Muna single) was released on 8 July 2021.

=== 2021–present: 20th anniversary and Light It Up ===
On 25 October 2021, Young announced the compilation 20 Years: The Greatest Hits for release on 27 May 2022, marking 20 years since he won Pop Idol. The album included his greatest hits alongside two new tracks, "Why Does It Hurt" and "Breaking Free". Young also announced the 20 Year Tour in support of the album in October 2022.

In January 2022 Young competed in the third series of The Masked Singer as "Lionfish". He was unmasked in the third episode.

From 22 February 2023 to 11 March 2023, Young starred in the play Song from Far Away, which was staged at HOME in Manchester. Mark Fisher, reviewing the play for The Guardian, praised Young's performance, writing that he "act[ed] with melodic grace". In June 2023 Young performed, again on the Avalon Stage, at the Glastonbury Festival. Young confirmed in an interview with Sky News that he had begun work on his next studio album and that it would be released in 2024.

In February 2024, Young posted a series of videos on Instagram, showing him working on a music video shoot. On 18 April 2024, Young released the single "Falling Deep", alongside an accompanying music video. A second single, "Midnight", was released on 7 June 2024. The singles' parent album, Light It Up, was released 9 August 2024; it debuted at number 5 on the UK Albums Chart. To accompany the album, Young toured the UK in September and October 2024.

== Other ventures ==
=== Acting career ===
Young added acting to his repertoire when he accepted a role in the BBC film Mrs Henderson Presents, starring Judi Dench and Bob Hoskins, in which he played Bertie. The film was released in the UK in November 2005 to positive reviews. Young was an executive producer for Ralph Fiennes' production of Shakespeare's Coriolanus filmed in Serbia, and his documentary on the making of the film features on its DVD release. He was to have a small role in the film as a reporter on the conflict as well as being executive producer, but it was decided that his appearance was a "distraction" and it did not make the final cut of the film.

Young trod the boards in the Royal Exchange Theatre's production of The Vortex by Noël Coward. This production ran from January to March 2007 and Young played the leading role of Nicky Lancaster. Critics, including Nicholas de Jongh, were positive. In 2012, Young appeared in the musical Cabaret in London, after a short nationwide tour. This marked his West End debut. He was awarded the What's on Stage Award for London Newcomer of the Year. He was also nominated for the 2013 Laurence Olivier Award for Best Actor in a Musical, but lost out to Michael Ball for Sweeney Todd: The Demon Barber of Fleet Street at the 2013 Laurence Olivier Awards.

Young also appeared in the 2010 Marple drama "The Mirror Crack'd from Side to Side" and guest starred in a 2010 episode of Skins. In 2011, he starred in a new drama series on Sky Living called Bedlam, about supernatural happenings taking place at a disused asylum being converted into loft-style apartments. The £3 million six-part series began airing on 7 February 2011. It was distributed by BBC Worldwide. Young was a guest on Top Gear during season 12 episode 2 and set the fastest wet lap around the track in the Chevrolet Lacetti. On 31 October 2011, Young was also the guest host of Never Mind the Buzzcocks.

In November 2004, Young presented a documentary entitled Runaways as part of the Children in Need campaign, highlighting the problems facing distressed teens who run away from home, and the plight they were in being picked up off the streets and railway stations by pimps who offered them work and drugs. The children did not know where to go for immediate help unless they were picked up by the police and sent to a refuge centre. During June 2007 a series of documentaries entitled Saving Planet Earth was shown on BBC Television. Young filmed an episode about saving the gorillas of West Africa during his visit to Africa earlier in the year.

In March 2009, ITV1 arts programme, The South Bank Show presented an hour long fly on the wall documentary about Young that they had been filming over the course of the year as he returned to promote the Let It Go album. It showed him in Iceland filming the video for the "Let It Go" single, backstage before his performance on The X Factor and on his UK theatre tour from November 2008 among other segments. In August 2011, ITV based an hour-long programme on Young, entitled A Night with.... Will Young. This was to promote the release of his most recent album Echoes.

In October 2007, Young narrated an audio version of the Roald Dahl novel Danny, the Champion of the World.

Young was made a "Companion" of the Liverpool Institute for Performing Arts in 2009.

In January 2023, Young returned to the theatre with the one-man show Song from Far Away, by Olivier Award winner Simon Stephens and Mark Eitzel, at the HOME Theatre in Manchester.

=== Other activities and charitable acts ===
On 27 October 2008, Young spoke on Celebrity at the Oxford Union, where he showed an interest in forming a band named 'Will Young and the Credit Crunchers'. He was invited to appear on Question Time after he said he was a fan of the programme. He participated in the edition from Dunstable, Bedfordshire, in February 2009 and March 2012.

Young supports the charity Women's Aid, about which he wrote, "I am proud to put my name beside this cause, and hope that I might be able to help more people affected by the terrors of domestic violence, as well as help to create a wider awareness within our society."

Young also supports Mencap, about which he wrote, "I'm very much in this for the long term, and I'd like to help continue to break down peoples' misconceptions and prejudices". He also supports The Children's Society Safe and Sound Campaign, and Positive Action Southwest (PASW), for which he performed at his first solo concert, in July 2003, at Killerton House, Exeter.

Young is the ambassador for Mood Foundation, a charity which aims to build a database of private therapists and alternative therapies to treat various types of depressive conditions. It was set up by Young's twin brother Rupert Young.

Young is an ambassador for Catch22, a UK young people's charity. In April 2011 Young ran the London Marathon for Catch22, competing again for the charity in 2012.

In August 2025, Young was announced as the first charity ambassador for Hope Rescue, a South Wales–based organisation supporting stray, abandoned, and vulnerable dogs. His appointment was described by Hope Rescue as a significant milestone for the charity, citing his long-standing commitment to rescue dogs and broader animal welfare campaigning.

On 18 April 2012, Young confirmed he would be releasing his first autobiography. The book was published by Sphere on 11 October 2012 entitled Funny Peculiar.

In August 2016, Young was announced as a contestant participating in the fourteenth series of Strictly Come Dancing. After having competed, with professional dancer Karen Clifton, over the first three weeks of the show, on 11 October he announced that he was quitting the show for "personal reasons".

Young is a longtime supporter of wildlife charities, including the World Wildlife Fund (WWF). He released "What the World Needs Now" in late 2015, from the album 85% Proof, to raise awareness and funds for declining wildlife populations around the world, saying, "It's shocking to think that in my lifetime global wildlife populations have declined by over 50% and our forests and oceans remain at risk." The music video, produced by WWF, was aired on UK television in late 2015.

Young confirmed on 1 September 2020 during BBC2's Newsnight interview that his book To Be a Gay Man would be published by Virgin Books on 3 September 2020. In it, he writes of the Chris Moyles "rampage of homophobia" in 2009, live on BBC Radio 1, which left Young "aghast" and unable to speak out against it at the time.

In November 2021, Young handcuffed himself to a gate, joining a protest at Camp Beagle.

Following the death of his twin, Rupert, Young presented a Channel 4 documentary, titled Will Young: Losing My Twin Rupert. The documentary, airing on 10 May 2022, was rated 4/5 stars by The Guardian. Young was praised by critics for being open and honest about Rupert's addiction and suicide.

== Personal life ==
In March 2002, after winning Pop Idol, Young publicly came out as gay, pre-empting a tabloid newspaper from outing him. He also stated that he had never hidden it and was comfortable with his sexual orientation. As of 2017, Young was in a relationship.

Young's main home is a house in Dalston, East London. He also owns a 17th-century cottage in the middle of Bodmin Moor, Cornwall, where he is a keen gardener. He also owns a Georgian townhouse worth around £1 million in Calne, Wiltshire.

On 30 July 2020, it was confirmed that Young's twin brother, Rupert, had died, aged 41. A spokesperson for the family said, "Will's relationship with Rupert had been tough over the years at times, and they had both spoken about the mental health problems which had made it challenging... there were hopes he had turned a corner and they are a very loving family — and utterly devastated by his passing."

In 2020, Young adopted two dogs which had faced euthanasia in America.

In April 2021, Young spoke about his experiences at his prep school, Horris Hill Preparatory School in Newbury, saying he had had PTSD. He said, "I've been thinking a lot about prep school, and wondering if any of those institutions will be brought to justice for the things that I saw happen... kids thrown against radiators. Other things I can't talk about." Young also remembered drunk teachers "rolling around dormitories", and one "you wouldn't go for a ride with... Teachers looking at our penises in the shower, in the bath... There was such a sense of injustice from things that I experienced and witnessed... I think I escaped — not that it didn't damage me."

In an August 2024 interview with Attitude magazine, Young expressed his desire to start a family, specifying fostering children. He shared, "I think I'd be very good at being emotionally available and emotionally validating. That's the key for kids or young people."

== Discography ==
- From Now On (2002)
- Friday's Child (2003)
- Keep On (2005)
- Let It Go (2008)
- Echoes (2011)
- 85% Proof (2015)
- Lexicon (2019)
- Crying on the Bathroom Floor (2021)
- Light It Up (2024)

== Tours ==
Headlining

- Will Young Live (2004)
- Keep On Live (2006)
- Let It Go Tour (2008)
- The Hits Tour (2009–2010)
- Echoes Tour (2011–2012)
- Love Revolution Tour (2015)
- An Evening with Will Young (2019)
- An Intimate Evening with Will Young (2021)
- 20 Years Tour (2022)
- Light It Up Tour (2024)
- The Evergreen 25th Anniversary Tour (2027)

Co-headlining

- Pop Idol Tour (2002) (with Jessica Garlick, Korben, Zoe Birkett, Gareth Gates, Hayley Evetts, Laura Doherty, Aaron Bayley, Darius Danesh and Rosie Ribbons)
- Will & Gareth Live (2002) (with Gareth Gates)

== Filmography ==
Film and television credits
Year	Title	Role	Notes
2005	Mrs Henderson Presents	Bertie	
2008	Top Gear	Himself	Appeared as the Star in a Reasonably Priced Car
2010	Skins	T Love	Episode: "Freddie"
2010	Marple	Casey Croft	Episode: "The Mirror Crack'd from Side to Side"
2011	Bedlam	Ryan McAllister	6 episodes
2011	A Night with... Will Young	Himself	Television special
2012	Code Words	Real Mr. Smith	Short film
2013	Highland Park	Seamus	
2016	Strictly Come Dancing	Himself	Series 14 contestant
2019–2021	Gardeners' World	Himself	2 episodes
2019	Cbeebies Bedtime Stories	Himself	Television Special
2022	The Masked Singer	Lionfish	Series 3 contestant
2022	Will Young: Losing My Twin Rupert	Himself	Television special
2024	McDonald & Dodds	Greg	Episode: "Jinxy Sings The Blues"

== Awards and nominations ==
=== BT Digital Music Awards ===
Launched in 2002, the BT Digital Music Awards were held annually in the United Kingdom.

Year	Nominee / work	Award	Result	Ref.
2003	Himself	Artist of the Year	Won	
2004	Himself	Artist of the Year	Won	
2004	"Friday's Child"	Best Music Video	Nominated	

=== Brit Awards ===
The Brit Awards are the British Phonographic Industry's (BPI) annual pop music awards.

Year	Nominee / work	Award	Result	Ref.
2003	"Anything is Possible"	British Single of the Year	Nominated	
2003	Himself	British Breakthrough Act	Won	
2003	Himself	Best Pop Act	Nominated	
2004	Himself	British Male Solo Artist	Nominated	
2005	Himself	British Male Solo Artist	Nominated	
2005	"Leave Right Now"	British Song of 25 Years	Nominated	
2005	"Your Game"	British Single of the Year	Won	
2006	Himself	British Male Solo Artist	Nominated	
2007	"All Time Love"	British Single of the Year	Nominated	
2009	Himself	British Male Solo Artist	Nominated	

=== British LGBT Awards ===
Year	Nominee / work	Award	Result	Ref.
2022	Himself	Music Artist	Nominated	

=== Gay Music Chart Awards ===
Year	Nominee / work	Award	Result	Ref.
2015	"Brave Man"	Best Transgender Music Video	Won	
2015	"Brave Man"	Best Song/Music Video with a Message	Won	
2015	"Brave Man"	Best Song	Nominated	
2015	"Brave Man"	Best British Music Video	Nominated	

=== Camerimage ===
Camerimage is a Polish film festival dedicated to the celebration of cinematography.

Year	Nominee / work	Award	Result	Ref.
2008	"Changes"	Best Cinematography	Nominated	

=== D&AD Awards ===
Design and Art Direction (D&AD) is a British educational charity which exists to promote excellence in design and advertising.

Year	Nominee / work	Award	Result	Ref.
2009	"Changes"	Best Music Video	Wood Pencil	
2009	"Changes"	Best Cinematography	Yellow Pencil	

=== Popjustice £20 Music Prize ===
The Popjustice £20 Music Prize is an annual prize awarded by a panel of judges organised by music website Popjustice to the singer(s) of the best British pop single of the past year. To qualify, a single must be by (a) British artist(s) and have been released within the 12 months before the award nominations in July.

Year	Nominee / work	Award	Result	Ref.
2004	"Leave Right Now"	Best British Pop Single	Nominated	
2006	"Who Am I"	Best British Pop Single	Nominated	
2012	"Jealousy"	Best British Pop Single	Won	

=== Silver Clef Awards ===
Year	Nominee / work	Award	Result	Ref.
2004	Himself	Artist of the Year	Won	

=== Smash Hits Poll Winners Party ===
The Smash Hits Poll Winners Party was an awards ceremony held annually by British magazine Smash Hits, and broadcast on BBC One.

Year	Nominee / work	Award	Result	Ref.
2002	Himself	Best Newcomer	Nominated	
2002	Himself	Best Live Act	Nominated	
2002	Himself	Most Fanciable Male	Nominated	
2002	Himself	Best Male Solo	Nominated	
2002	"Evergreen"	Best Single	Nominated	
2002	From Now On	Best Album	Nominated	
2004	Friday's Child	Best Album	Nominated	

=== The Record of the Year ===
The Record of the Year was an award voted by the UK public. The award began in 1998, and was televised on ITV before being dropped in 2006 after disagreements over the phone voting element. Since then it has been an online poll, administered through the Record of the Year website. In 2013, it was axed, signaling the end of the award.

Year	Nominee / work	Award	Result	Ref.
2002	"Evergreen"	The Record of the Year	Nominated	
2004	"Leave Right Now"	The Record of the Year	Nominated	

=== Top of the Pops Awards ===
The Top of the Pops Awards were awarded annually by television programme Top of the Pops.

Year	Nominee / work	Award	Result	Ref.
2002	Himself	Top Fan Site	Nominated	
2002	Himself	Best Pop Act	Nominated	
2002	Himself	Best Newcomer	Won	
2002	"Evergreen"	Best Single	Won	
2003	Himself	Singer of the Year	Nominated	
2003	Himself	Best Newcomer	Nominated	
2003	Himself	Best Official Site	Nominated	
2003	Himself	Best Fan Site	Won	
2003	"Leave Right Now"	Song of the Year	Nominated	
2003	"Leave Right Now"	Video of the Year	Nominated	

=== UK Festival Awards ===
Year	Nominee / work	Award	Result	Ref.
2008	Himself	Festival Pop Act	Nominated	

=== UK Music Video Awards ===
The UK Music Video Awards is an annual award ceremony founded in 2008 to recognise creativity, technical excellence and innovation in music videos and moving images for music.

Year	Nominee / work	Award	Result	Ref.
2008	"Changes"	UK Music Video Awards – People's Choice Award	Nominated	
2009	"Changes"	Best Pop Video	Won	
2009	"Let It Go"	Best Pop Video	Nominated	
2009	"Let It Go"	Best Cinematography in a Video	Nominated	
2012	"Losing Myself"	Best Choreography in a Video	Won	
2012	"Losing Myself"	Best Pop Video – UK	Nominated	
2012	"Losing Myself"	Best Telecine in a Video	Nominated	

=== Virgin Media Music Awards ===
Year	Nominee / work	Award	Result	Ref.
2005	Himself	Best Solo Artist	Nominated	
2005	Himself	Hunk of the Year	Nominated	
2005	Keep On	Best Album	Nominated	
2011	Himself	Hottest Male	Nominated	
2011	Himself	Best Act of Reality TV Fame	Nominated	

=== Laurence Olivier Awards ===
The Laurence Olivier Award is presented annually by the Society of London Theatre (SLT) to recognize excellence in professional theater. Named after the renowned British actor Laurence Olivier, the awards are a UK equivalent of Broadway's Tony Awards.

Year	Nominee / work	Award	Result	Ref.
2013	Cabaret	Laurence Olivier Award for Best Actor in a Musical	Nominated	

== See also ==
- List of British actors
