= Your Game =

2004 single by Will Young

Single by Will Young

from the album Friday's Child
- B-side: "Take Control"; "Down"
- Released: 15 March 2004
- Length: 4:10 (album version); 3:34 (radio edit)
- Label: 19; S; RCA; BMG
- Songwriters: Will Young; Taio Cruz; Bair MacKichan
- Producers: Stephen Lipson; Blair MacKichan

Will Young singles chronology
"Leave Right Now" (2003)	"Your Game" (2004)	"Friday's Child" (2004)

Alternative cover
- UK CD 2

"Your Game" is a song by British singer Will Young. It was written by Young, Taio Cruz and Blair MacKichan for his second studio album, Friday's Child (2003), while production was helmed by Stephen Lipson and MacKichan. The song was released as the album's second single on 15 March 2004, reaching number three on the UK Singles Chart. "Your Game" won the Brit Award for Song of the Year in 2005.

== Music video ==
A music video for "Your Game" was directed by Michael Gracey and Pete Commins. After their collaboration, they were invited to direct Will's live tour at Wembley in 2004.

== Track listings ==
UK CD1

1. "Your Game" (Will Young, Blair MacKichan, Tayo Onile-Ere)
2. "Your Game" (acoustic gospel version)

UK CD2

1. "Your Game"
2. "Take Control" (Young, R. Stannard, J. Gallagher, S. Hale)
3. "Down" (Young, S. Morales, R. Shaw, D. Siegel, D. Warner)
4. "Your Game" (video)

== Personnel ==
- Neil Conti – drums
- Taio Cruz – writing
- Stephen Lipson – production, programming
- Bair MacKichan – drums, guitar, programming, writing
- Heff Moraes – mixing engineer
- Dave Naughton – Pro Tools
- Will Young – vocals, writing

== Charts ==
=== Weekly charts ===
Weekly chart performance for "Your Game"
Chart (2004)	Peak position
Australia (ARIA)	81
Belgium (Ultratip Bubbling Under Flanders)	16
Europe (Eurochart Hot 100)	13
Ireland (IRMA)	10
Scottish Singles Sales (Official Charts)	3
UK Singles (Official Charts)	3

=== Year-end charts ===
Year-end chart performance for "Your Game"
Chart (2004)	Position
UK Singles (OCC)	64

== Release history ==
Release dates and formats for "Your Game"
Region	Date	Format(s)	Label(s)	Ref.
United Kingdom	15 March 2004	CD	19; S; RCA; BMG	
