= Nyco Lilliu =

French singer

- Born: Nicolas Lilliu; 24 August 1987 (age 39); Carspach, near Mulhouse, France
- Genres: Pop
- Occupations: Singer, songwriter, musician
- Instruments: Vocals, guitar
- Years active: 2006 – present
- Labels: Universal Music France; Warner Music France

Nicolas "Nyco" Lilliu (born 1987) is a French singer of mixed French-Italian origin. His father is from Terralba, Sardinia and his mother from Brittany. He is the younger brother of French rock singer Pierrick Lilliu.

== Biography ==
Lilliu was born in Carspach, near Mulhouse, Alsace. He started very early in music, learning to play the guitar at age 11, and was very much affected by Italian music. At 15, the family left Alsace to live in Brittany where his mother originated from. In 2006, at age 19, he left to Paris to pursue an artistic career.

His first studio release was "Comme un frère", a duo recorded with his brother Pierrick Lilliu and appearing in Pierrick's album Besoin d'espace. He was credited as Nicolas Lilliu on the album.

Lilliu's first solo recordings were with Mercury where he released an Italian album of songs including "Dimmi Perche". The solo album also contained "La Luna", Nyco's own composition.

He was signed to Universal Music and later to Warner Music where he is preparing his main commercial album due in 2013. The single from the upcoming album with Warner was the Italian-language song "Tu ed io più lei".

In 2013, he took part in Robin des Bois, a major musical in France, where he plays the role of Friar Tuck. His track "Un monde à changer", an official single of the French musical, released in September 2012, a full year prior to the official launch of the musical has charted on SNEP, the French Singles Chart and in Ultratip French Belgian Charts. The musical Robin des Bois is a modern adaptation of Robin Hood, where the lead role is played by French singer M. Pokora. The show premiered on 26 September 2013 in Palais des congrès de Paris.

In 2014, he took part in a compilation album Latin Lovers with three tracks: solo interpretation of "La solitudine" originally from Laura Pausini, a duo with Damien Sargue interpreting "Una storia importante" from Eros Ramazzotti and as a trio with Nuno Resende and Julio Iglesias Jr. singing "Più bella cosa" also from Ramazzotti.

== Musical ==
- 2013 : Robin des Bois as Frère Tuck (Friar Tuck in English)

== Discography ==
=== Singles ===
Year	Single	Peak positions		Album
Year	Single	FR	BEL (Wa)	Album
2008	"Dimmi perche"	–	–	
2010	"Il ricordo che ho di noi"	–	–	TBA
2011	"Tu ed io più lei"	–	–	TBA
2012	"Un monde à changer"	114	27	Robin des Bois
2013	"À nous" (with M. Pokora & Marc Antoine)	169	–	Robin des Bois

Other releases

- 2013: "Gloria" (with Vincent Niclo)
- 2014: "La solitudine" (from Latin Lovers (compilation cover album)

Collaborations

- 2005 : Comme un frère (in Pierrick Lilliu album Besoin d'espace)
- 2014 : Latin Lovers
  - Including: "La solitudine" (solo) / "Più bella cosa" (with Nuno Resende and Julio Iglesias Jr)
