= Carspach =

Commune in Grand Est, France

- Commune
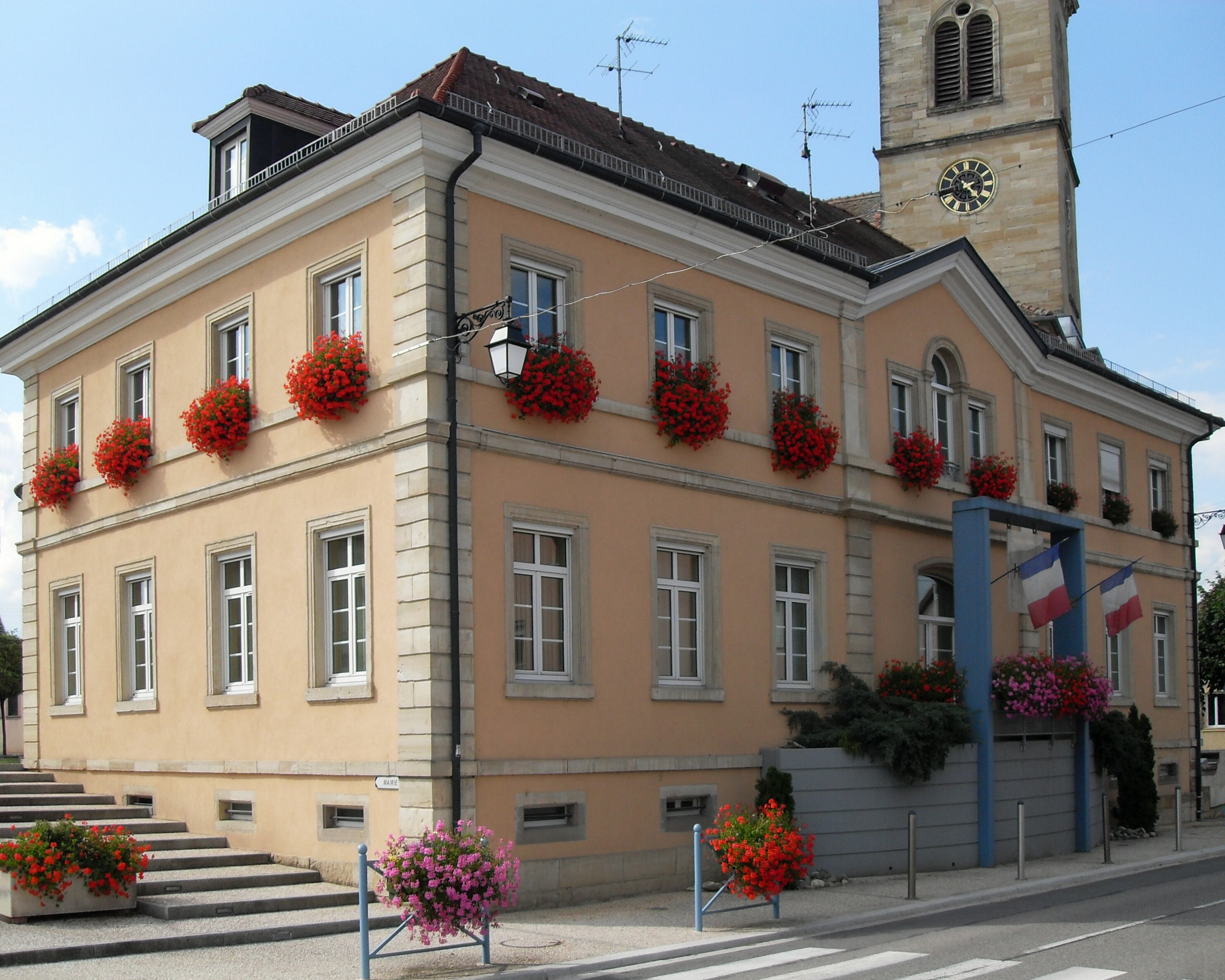
- The town hall in Carspach

- Coat of arms
- Location of Carspach
- Location within France Location within Grand Est
- Coordinates: 47°36′58″N 7°12′46″E
- Country: France
- Region: Grand Est
- Department: Haut-Rhin
- Arrondissement: Altkirch
- Canton: Altkirch

Government
  - Mayor (2020–2026): Rémi Spillmann
- Area^{1}: 17.17 km^{2} (6.63 sq mi)
- Elevation: 300 m (980 ft)
- Highest elevation: 397 m (1,302 ft)
- Lowest elevation: 283 m (928 ft)
- Population (2023): 2,091
  - Density: 121.8/km^{2} (315.4/sq mi)
- Time zone: UTC+01:00 (CET)
  - Summer (DST): UTC+02:00 (CEST)
- INSEE/Postal code: 68062 /68130
- ^{1} French Land Register data, which excludes lakes, ponds, glaciers > 1 km^{2} (0.386 sq mi or 247 acres) and river estuaries.

Carspach (French pronunciation: [kaʁspak]; German: Karspach) is a commune in the Haut-Rhin department in Alsace in north-eastern France.

== Population ==
Historical population
Year	Pop.	±% p.a.
1968	1,558	—
1975	1,500	−0.54%
1982	1,448	−0.50%
1990	1,399	−0.43%
1999	1,620	+1.64%
2007	1,816	+1.44%
2012	2,045	+2.40%
2017	2,044	−0.01%
2023	2,091	+0.38%
Source: INSEE

== Etymology ==
Carspach has historically been attested as Charoltespach in 877 and Karolspach in 1266. The toponym Carspach is of Germanic origin, deriving from the anthroponym Charoald. The Germanic hydronym *-bak(i) entered the French language via High German, and took on two forms: the Germanic form -bach and Romantic -bais.

== See also ==
- Communes of the Haut-Rhin department
