= Blair MacKichan =

British musician and songwriter

Blair MacKichan is a British musician and songwriter.

He started his musical career playing drums, then later progressed to the piano. As a musician he fronts a band named Blair and Friends.

MacKichan writes a lot of his own material. He won a Brit Award for the 2004 song "Your Game" after it became a hit for Will Young. He also wrote for Lily Allen.

Blair's 1995 single "Have Fun, Go Mad" reached number 37 in the UK Singles Chart, number 81 on The Australian ARIA Charts and number 41 on the New Zealand Charts in 1998. It was included on the soundtracks of the films The Daytrippers, Dunston Checks In (1996), Bean: The Ultimate Disaster Movie (1997), and Sliding Doors (1998).
