= Pierrick Lilliu =

- Born: 13 July 1986 (age 40)
- Origin: Mulhouse, Alsace, France
- Genres: Pop rock
- Occupation: Singer-songwriter
- Years active: 2005–present
- Labels: RCA; Sony-BMG
- Website: www.pierricklilliu.com

Pierrick Lilliu (born 13 July 1986) is a French rock singer from Brittany, born in Mulhouse, Alsace. He finished in second place on season 3 of Nouvelle Star in 2005.

After the show, he recorded his first single, "À cœur ouvert", which he first sang on stage on 19 May and was officially released on 30 May 2005. His album Besoin d'espace (Need of space) went on sale on 17 October 2005.

Lilliu is the eldest of three children in the Lilliu family, and his younger brother, Nyco Lilliu, is also a singer.

== Discography ==
=== Albums ===
Year	Album	Peak positions		Track listing
Year	Album	FRA	SUI	Track listing
2005	Besoin d'Espace: Release date: 17 October 2005; Record label: Sony BMG	35	84	1. "Besoin d'espace" (3:09); 2. "Héroïne" (3:51); 3. "À coeur ouvert" (3:32); 4. "Des Larmes (3:28); 5. "S'arrêter là" (3:33); 6. "La même erreur (3:43); 7. "Ecoute-moi" (4:30); 8. "Bretagne Dédicace" (4:44); 9. "Comme un frère" (feat. Nicolas Lilliu) – (3:09); 10. "Je savais" (3:38); 11. "Là-haut" (4:36)

=== Singles ===
Year	Album	Peak positions			Notes
Year	Album	BEL (Wa)	FRA	SUI	Notes
2005	"À cœur ouvert": Release date: 30 May 2005; Record label: Sony BMG	24	6	30	Besoin d'espace
2005	"Besoin d'espace": Release date: 17 October 2005; Record label: Sony BMG	–	–	–	Besoin d'espace

== Filmography ==
- 2006 : Le héros de la famille by Thierry Klifa.
