= Steve Lee (songwriter) =

British singer-songwriter

Steve Lee is an Ivor Novello nominated English songwriter and musician. He has written for artists worldwide and had numerous international hits.

In the mid-1980s, as a lead vocalist, he worked on an original project with Anne Dudley (Art of Noise) but failed to secure a record deal. In 1985, as a sax player, he toured with the band B-Movie. He then fronted the band Krew, comprising mainly Nik Kershaw's band, and released the single "Paper Heroes" on WEA Records in April 1986. The band was short-lived, however, and from there he toured with The Duel as a sax player, supporting 5 Star on their British tour of 1987.

In 1988, Lee signed to IRS Records with Gary Miller as Big Smile and released one single, "Crocodile Tears", after which they split. Lee returned to session work, including providing backing vocals on Diane Tell's French album Degriffe-Moi. He toured with Then Jerico in 1989 and with Joan Armatrading in 1990, playing saxophone, guitar, percussion and providing backing vocals on her world tour.

In 1991, in partnership with Simon Ellis, he wrote and produced the single "People of the World" by Sorell Johnson, chosen as Gary Davis' Radio 1 Record of The Week, and "Crying in the Rain" for Randy Crawford with Judy Cheeks. During this period, Lee worked as a session musician, playing saxophone and providing backing vocals for Kym Mazelle, Jaki Graham, Jason Donovan, Nick Berry and the DJ Sasha. Lee produced and co-wrote the single "D'Jilawendie" for Portuguese singer Teresa Maiuko, for whom he was also bassist and musical director on her Portuguese tour of 1993. That same year, he co-wrote the Jason Donovan track "Shout About".

In August 1993, he signed to PWL Records as FKW, releasing an Italian House version of "Never Gonna Give You Up" and "Seize The Day", reaching number 1 in the dance charts. In February 1994, "Jingo" peaked at number 15. Two further singles followed: "This Is The Way" and "Laura Palmer's Theme". Using live Brazilian percussion, Lee was voted Club PA act of the Year by Disco International. In 1995, he replaced Tony Jackson as lead singer with Rage, releasing one single, "My Crying's Done".

In 1997, Lee formed the studio band Franklyn with Steve Torch, later recruiting Sarah Brown of the London Community Gospel Choir on vocals. Fusing drum and bass and trip-hop, the band signed with Jammin' Records the following year and released the album What's My Name? in 1999, produced by Lee.

From 2000, Lee began a hugely successful period writing for other artists including Britney Spears, Christina Milian, Will Young, Girls Aloud, Emma Bunton, Randy Crawford, S-Club 7 and Backstreet Boys' Nick Carter. His song "Love Will Set You Free" released by Starchaser on Ministry of Sound also featured Lee's lead vocals and went to be no1 in the Dance Charts. During this period, he also provided backing vocals for several major artists including Lionel Richie, Enrique Iglesias and Lil Wayne.

His song "Friday's Child", released as a single by Will Young in 2004, reached No4 in the national charts and was nominated for an Ivor Novello award. In 2006 Lee was invited on the Ivor Novello judges' panel for Best Contemporary Song.
