= Will Young discography =

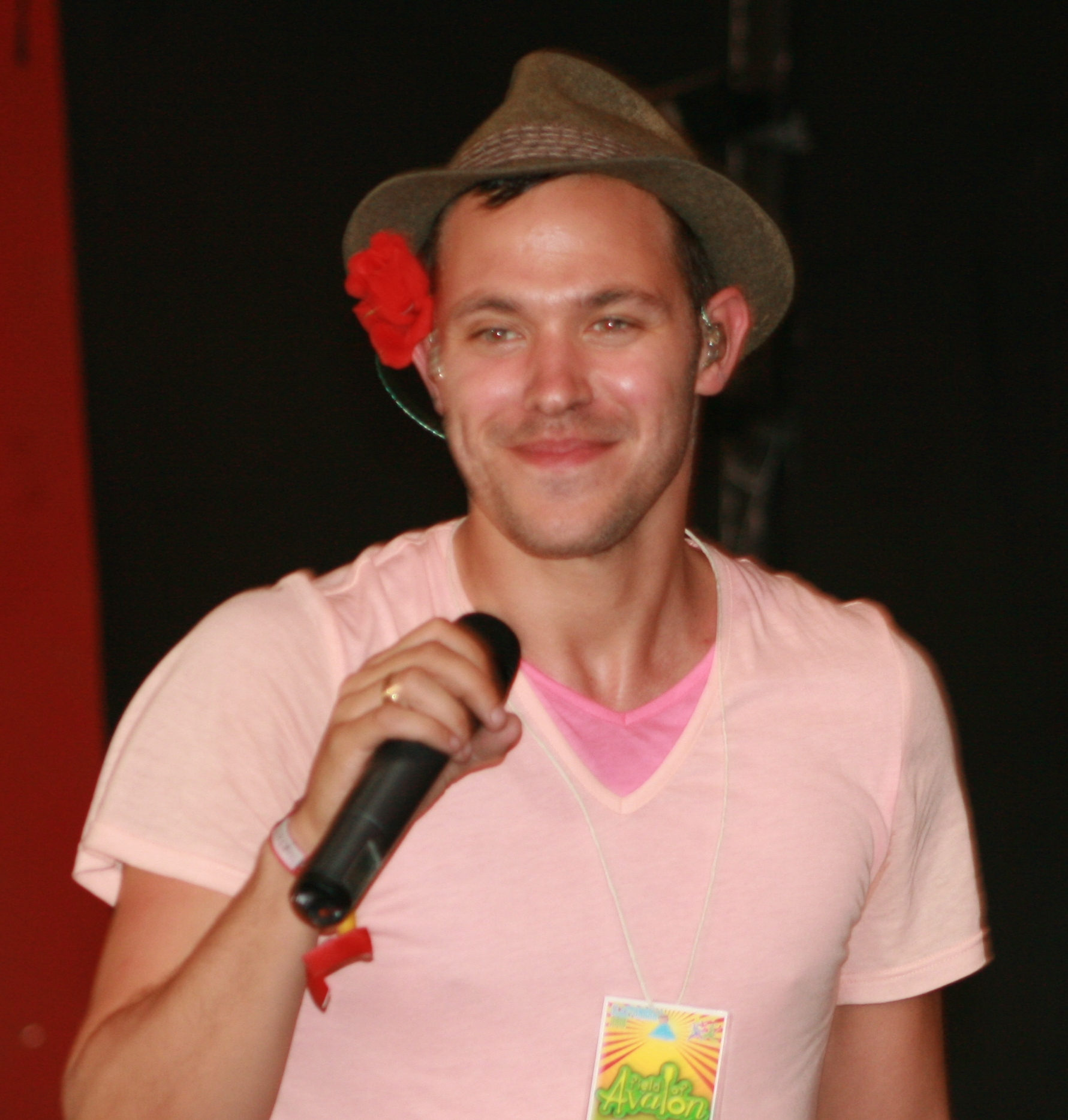
- Will Young during an interview at Glastonbury, 2008
- Studio albums: 9
- Extended plays: 2
- Compilation albums: 4
- Singles: 36
- Video albums: 2
- Music videos: 29

The discography of Will Young, an English singer who rose to fame when he won the first series of Pop Idol in 2001, includes nine studio albums, four compilation albums, two extended plays (EPs), thirty-six singles, and twenty-eight music videos. Young's debut single was a double A-side, "Evergreen" and "Anything Is Possible", released in 2002. This became the fastest-selling debut single in UK chart history going straight to number one and going on to sell over 1.8 million copies. In the Top 40 Biggest Selling Singles of the 21st Century (so far) published by the Official Charts Company, "Evergreen" topped the list. In October 2002 Young released his debut album, From Now On, which included "Evergreen" and "Anything Is Possible", "Light My Fire", "The Long and Winding Road" (a duet with Gareth Gates, released as a double A-side with Gates's song "Suspicious Minds") and "Don't Let Me Down"/"You and I" (released in aid of Children in Need).

Young's second album Friday's Child was released in December 2003. It features the singles "Leave Right Now", "Your Game" and "Friday's Child". In November 2005 Young released his third album, Keep On, which included the singles "All Time Love", "Switch It On" and "Who Am I". In September 2008 Young's fourth album, Let It Go was released and it peaked at number two. Singles released were "Changes", "Grace", "Let It Go" and "Tell Me the Worst".

Young released his first greatest hits collection, The Hits, in November 2009, a compilation of his greatest singles between 2002 and 2009, including two brand new compositions. His fifth studio album, Echoes, released 22 August 2011 became his first number-one album since 2003, producing four singles. His sixth studio album, 85% Proof, was released on 25 May 2015 on Island Records, which he signed to in 2012. After a four-year break, Lexicon was released on 21 June 2019. Young's latest, his eighth studio album Crying on the Bathroom Floor was released on 6 August 2021.

Young's ninth studio album, "Light It Up", was released on 9 August 2024; it was preceded by the singles "Falling Deep" and "Midnight".

All of Young's studio albums have debuted in the top 5 of the UK Albums Chart, four of which peaked at number one.

== Albums ==
=== Studio albums ===
List of albums, with selected chart positions, sales, and certifications
Title	Album details	Peak chart positions					Certifications
Title	Album details	UK	GER	IRE	NLD	SWI	Certifications
From Now On	Released: 7 October 2002; Labels: 19 Recordings, RCA, BMG; Formats: CD	1	62	11	23	—	BPI: 2× Platinum
Friday's Child	Released: 1 December 2003; Labels: 19 Recordings, RCA, BMG; Formats: CD	1	—	9	48	—	BPI: 5× Platinum
Keep On	Released: 21 November 2005; Labels: 19 Recordings, RCA, Sony BMG; Formats: CD, digital download	2	—	33	85	—	BPI: 3× Platinum; IRMA: Gold
Let It Go	Released: 29 September 2008; Labels: 19 Recordings, RCA, Sony BMG; Formats: CD, digital download	2	—	12	—	—	BPI: Platinum
Echoes	Released: 22 August 2011; Labels: 19 Recordings, RCA, Sony Music; Formats: CD, digital download	1	—	12	—	—	BPI: Platinum
85% Proof	Released: 25 May 2015; Label: Island; Formats: CD, digital download	1	—	38	—	—	BPI: Gold
Lexicon	Released: 21 June 2019; Label: Cooking Vinyl; Formats: CD, digital download, vinyl, cassette	2	—	73	—	84	
Crying on the Bathroom Floor	Released: 6 August 2021; Label: Cooking Vinyl; Formats: CD, digital download, vinyl, cassette	3	—	—	—	—	
Light It Up	Released: 9 August 2024; Label: BMG; Formats: CD, digital download	5	—	—	—	—	
"—" denotes album that did not chart or was not released

=== Compilation albums ===
Title	Album details	Peak chart positions			Certifications
Title	Album details	UK	SCO	US Heat.	Certifications
The Hits	Released: 16 November 2009; Labels: 19 Recordings, RCA, Sony Music; Formats: CD, digital download	7	—	—N/a	BPI: 2× Platinum; IRMA: Gold
Leave Right Now	Released: 8 May 2010; Labels: 19, Jive, Sony Music; Formats: CD, digital download	—N/a	—N/a	13	
The Essential	Released: 11 November 2013; Label: RCA; Formats: CD, digital download	15	—	—N/a	BPI: Gold
20 Years: The Greatest Hits	Released: 27 May 2022; Label: Sony Music; Formats: 2×CD, digital download, vinyl	6	5	—	

=== Video albums ===
- Will Young Live (7 April 2003)
- Live in London (21 March 2005)

== Extended plays ==
Title	EP details
Summer Covers	Released: 26 August 2016; Label: Will Young; Formats: CD, vinyl, digital download
Crying on the Bathroom Floor: Remix EP	Released: 4 November 2021; Label: Cooking Vinyl; Formats: Digital download, streaming

== Singles ==
Single	Year	Peak chart positions										Certifications (sales thresholds)	Album
Single	Year	UK	UK Dig.	BEL	GER	IRE	ITA	NL	NZ	SWE	US	Certifications (sales thresholds)	Album
"Anything Is Possible" / "Evergreen"	2002	1	65	—	—	2	—	—	—	—	—	BPI: 3× Platinum	From Now On
"Light My Fire"	2002	1	—	60	44	5	4	21	—	—	—	BPI: Gold	From Now On
"The Long and Winding Road" (with Gareth Gates)	2002	1	—	—	—	4	—	—	—	—	—	BPI: Gold	From Now On
"Don't Let Me Down"	2002	2	—	—	—	27	—	—	—	—	—	BPI: Silver	From Now On
"You and I"	2002	2	—	—	—	27	28	3	—	—	—	BPI: Silver	From Now On
"Leave Right Now"	2003	1	—	64	—	1	27	36	29	6	81	BPI: Platinum	Friday's Child
"Your Game"	2004	3	—	66	—	10	—	—	—	—	—		Friday's Child
"Friday's Child"	2004	4	—	—	—	31	—	—	—	—	—		Friday's Child
"Switch It On"	2005	5	9	—	—	23	—	—	—	—	—		Keep On
"All Time Love"	2006	3	5	—	69	12	—	—	—	—	—	BPI: Silver	Keep On
"Who Am I"	2006	11	17	—	—	21	—	—	—	—	—	BPI: Silver	Keep On
"Changes"	2008	10	9	—	—	28	—	—	—	—	—		Let It Go
"Grace"	2008	33	34	—	—	—	—	—	—	—	—		Let It Go
"Let It Go"	2009	58	—	—	—	—	—	—	—	—	—		Let It Go
"Hopes & Fears"	2009	62	65	—	—	—	—	—	—	—	—		The Hits
"Jealousy"	2011	5	5	68	—	23	—	—	—	—	—	BPI: Gold	Echoes
"Come On"	2011	83	83	—	—	—	—	—	—	—	—		Echoes
"Losing Myself"	2012	72	88	—	—	—	—	—	—	—	—		Echoes
"I Just Want a Lover"	2012	—	—	—	—	—	—	—	—	—	—		Echoes
"Love Revolution"	2015	103	60	73	—	—	—	—	—	—	—		85% Proof
"Thank You"	2015	—	87	—	—	—	—	—	—	—	—		85% Proof
"Joy"	2015	—	—	—	—	—	—	—	—	—	—		85% Proof
"What the World Needs Now"	2015	—	53	—	—	—	—	—	—	—	—		85% Proof
"All the Songs"	2019	—	24	—	—	—	—	—	—	—	—		Lexicon
"My Love"	2019	—	91	—	—	—	—	—	—	—	—		Lexicon
"Daniel"	2021	—	29	—	—	—	—	—	—	—	—		Crying on the Bathroom Floor
"Elizabeth Taylor"	2021	—	—	—	—	—	—	—	—	—	—		Crying on the Bathroom Floor
"Crying on the Bathroom Floor"	2021	—	29	—	—	—	—	—	—	—	—		Crying on the Bathroom Floor
"Why Does It Hurt"	2022	—	87	—	—	—	—	—	—	—	—		20 Years: The Greatest Hits
"Falling Deep"	2024	—	62	—	—	—	—	—	—	—	—		Light It Up
"Midnight"	2024	—	96	—	—	—	—	—	—	—	—		Light It Up
"Light It Up"	2024	—	—	—	—	—	—	—	—	—	—		Light It Up

=== Promotional singles ===
Single	Year
"Tell Me the Worst" (Club promo)	2009
"The Way I See"	2011
"Amy"	2016
"Christmas Time"	2019
"Strong"	2021
"Breaking Free"	2022
"The Worst"	2024

== Other appearances ==
Song	Year	Other performer(s)	Film / Album
"Beyond the Sea"	2002	—N/a	Pop Idol: The Big Band Album
"I Won't Dance"	2002	—N/a	Pop Idol: The Big Band Album
"Your Love Is King"	2004	—N/a	Bridget Jones: The Edge of Reason
"Letting in the Sunshine"	2005	—N/a	Mrs. Henderson Presents
"Goody Goody"	2005	Camille O'Sullivan	Mrs. Henderson Presents
"The Blitz: Bombing" / "The Grecian Frieze" / "Defiance"	2005	—N/a	Mrs. Henderson Presents
"All the Things You Are"	2005	—N/a	Mrs. Henderson Presents
"The Sails of the Windmill"	2005	Camille O'Sullivan	Mrs. Henderson Presents
"Girl in the Little Green Hat"	2005	—N/a	Mrs. Henderson Presents
"Hey Ya!"	2006	—N/a	Radio 1's Live Lounge
"History"	2010	Groove Armada	Black Light
"Running Up that Hill"	2011	—N/a	Dermot O'Leary Presents The Saturday Sessions 2011
"Hanging on the Telephone"	2013	—N/a	Dermot O'Leary Presents The Saturday Sessions 2013
"I Only Want to Be with You"	2019	Emma Bunton	My Happy Place
