= The Essential (Will Young album) =

Greatest hits album by Will Young
- Released: 14 October 2013
- Recorded: 2002–2011
- Genre: Pop; synthpop; dance-pop
- Label: 19 Recordings; RCA; Sony Music

Will Young chronology
Echoes (2011)	The Essential (2013)	85% Proof (2015)

The Essential is a compilation album by English recording artist Will Young. Completing his contract with his record company, it was released by 19 Recordings in association with RCA Records and Sony Music on 14 October 2013, marking Young's final release with the label.

== Track listing ==
No.	Title	Writer(s)	Producer(s)	Length
1.	"Jealousy" (from Echoes)	Will Young; Jim Eliot; Mima Stilwell	Richard X; Eliot; Pete Hofmann	4:07
2.	"Leave Right Now" (from Friday's Child)	Eg White	Stephen Lipson	3:34
3.	"Evergreen" (from From Now On)	Jörgen Elofsson; Per Magnusson; David Kreuger	Magnusson; Kreuger	4:12
4.	"Light My Fire" (from From Now On)	Jim Morrison; Ray Manzarek; John Densmore; Robby Krieger	Absolute	3:28
5.	"Your Game" (from Friday's Child)	Young; Blair MacKichan; Taio Cruz	Lipson; MacKichan	4:10
6.	"Don't Let Me Down" (Single release only)	Young; Richard Stannard; Julian Gallagher; D. Morgan; Simon Hale	Stannard; Gallagher	4:46
7.	"You and I" (from From Now On)	Mike Peden; Ed Johnson; Henry Johnson	Peden	4:04
8.	"Friday's Child" (from Friday's Child)	Steve Lee; Dina Taylor	Lipson	8:59
9.	"Come On" (from Echoes)	Stilwell; Eliot	Richard X; Eliot; Hofmann	3:11
10.	"Switch It On" (from Keep On)	Young; Lipson; Ronnie Peterson; Karen Poole; Steven Wolf	Lipson	3:48
11.	"All Time Love" (from Keep On)	Jamie Hartman		3:56
12.	"Who Am I" (from Keep On)	White; Lucie Silvas		4:28
13.	"Changes" (from Let It Go)	Young; White		4:00
14.	"Grace" (from Let It Go)	Young; Matt Prime	Stannard; Ash Howes	4:37
15.	"Anything Is Possible" (from From Now On)	Chris Braide; Cathy Dennis	Dennis; Oskar Paul	3:41
16.	"Let It Go" (from Let It Go)	White; Jeremy Gregory; Poole	White	3:41
17.	"Hopes & Fears" (from The Hits)	Yolanda Quartey; Stew Jackson	Robot Club	3:46
18.	"The Long and Winding Road" (with Gareth Gates (from From Now On)	Lennon–McCartney	Lipson; Steve Mac	3:32

== Charts ==
Chart (2013)	Peak position
UK Albums (OCC)	15

== Certifications ==
Region	Certification	Certified units/sales
United Kingdom (BPI)	Gold	100,000^{‡}
^{‡} Sales+streaming figures based on certification alone.
