= Leave Right Now (album) =

Compilation album by Will Young
- Released: 25 May 2010
- Recorded: 2003–2008
- Length: 37:17
- Labels: Jive; 19
- Producers: Ash Howes; Stephen Lipson; Blair MacKichan; Richard "Biff" Stannard; Eg White

Will Young chronology
The Hits (2009)	Leave Right Now (2010)	Echoes (2011)

Leave Right Now is a compilation album by British singer-songwriter Will Young. It was released by Jive Records and 19 Entertainment exclusively in Canada and the United States where it served as debut. The album contains eight tracks from three of his first four studio albums, Friday's Child (2002), Keep On (2003) and Let It Go (2005). Leave Right Now reached number 13 on the US Heatseekers chart.

== Critical reception ==
Professional ratings
Review scores
Source	Rating
AllMusic	3/5 stars

AllMusic editor Stephen Thomas Erlewine remarked that "Young specializes in super-slick soft rock and super-stiff white funk. An excellent vocal artist that is always pitch perfect. A national treasure and undersung British vocal artist.

== Track listing ==
Leave Right Now track listing
No.	Title	Writer(s)	Producer(s)	Length
1.	"Leave Right Now" (from Friday's Child)	Eg White	Stephen Lipson	3:30
2.	"Your Game" (from Friday's Child)	Will Young; Blair MacKichan; Tayo Onile-Ere	Lipson; Blair MacKichan	4:08
3.	"Friday's Child" (from Friday's Child)	Steve Lee; Dina Taylor	Lipson	8:58
4.	"Switch It On" (from Keep On)	Young; Lipson; Ronnie Peterson; Karen Poole; Steven Wolf	Lipson	3:46
5.	"All Time Love" (from Keep On)	Jamie Hartman	Lipson	3:55
6.	"Who Am I" (from Keep On)	White; Lucie Silvas	Lipson	4:25
7.	"Changes" (from Let It Go)	Young; White	White	3:57
8.	"Grace" (from Let It Go)	Young; Matt Prime	Richard "Biff" Stannard; Ash Howes	4:35
Total length:				37:17

== Charts ==
Chart performance for Leave Right Now
Chart (2010)	Peak position
US Billboard Heatseekers	13

== Release history ==
Leave Right Now release history
Region	Date	Format	Label
United States	25 May 2010	CD; digital download	Jive
