= The Hits (Will Young album) =

Greatest hits album by Will Young
- Released: 16 November 2009
- Recorded: 2002–2009
- Label: 19; RCA; Sony
- Producer: Absolute; Ash Howes; David Kreuger; Stephen Lipson; Blair MacKichan; Per Magnusson; Mike Peden; Richard Stannard; Eg White; Robot Club

Will Young chronology
Let It Go (2008)	The Hits (2009)	Leave Right Now (2010)

Singles from The Hits
- 1. "Hopes & Fears" Released: 8 November 2009

Professional ratings
Review scores
Source	Rating
AllMusic	4/5 stars

The Hits is a greatest hits compilation album by British singer-songwriter Will Young. It was released on 16 November 2009. It contains twelve songs from Young's first four studio albums, From Now On (2002), Friday's Child (2003), Keep On (2005) and Let It Go (2008), plus two bonus tracks. The first is new single "Hopes & Fears", and the second is a ballad called "If It Hadn't Been for Love".

The album is noted for omitting certain single releases: "Anything Is Possible", which was a number-one hit as a double A-side with "Evergreen", the number-one duet with Gareth Gates, "The Long and Winding Road" and the single "Don't Let Me Down". Four tracks were written or co-written by Will Young.

== Track listing ==
The Hits
No.	Title	Writer(s)	Original album	Length
1.	"Evergreen"	Jörgen Elofsson; Per Magnusson; David Kreuger	From Now On (2002)	4:12
2.	"Light My Fire"	Jim Morrison; Ray Manzarek; John Densmore; Robby Krieger	From Now On	3:28
3.	"You and I"	Mike Peden; Ed Johnson; Henry Johnson	From Now On	4:04
4.	"Leave Right Now"	Eg White	Friday's Child (2003)	3:34
5.	"Your Game"	Will Young; Blair MacKichan; Tayo Onile-Ere	Friday's Child	4:10
6.	"Friday's Child"	Steve Lee; D. Taylor	Friday's Child	8:59
7.	"Switch It On"	W. Young; Stephen Lipson; Ronnie Peterson; Karen Poole; Steven Wolf	Keep On (2005)	3:47
8.	"All Time Love"	Jamie Hartman	Keep On	3:56
9.	"Who Am I"	E. White; Lucie Silvas	Keep On	4:28
10.	"Changes"	W. Young; E. White	Let It Go (2008)	4:00
11.	"Grace"	W. Young; Matt Prime	Let It Go	4:37
12.	"Let It Go"	E. White; Jeremy Gregory; K. Poole	Let It Go	3:41
13.	"Hopes & Fears"	Yolanda Quartey; Stew Jackson	Original	3:46
14.	"If It Hadn't Been for Love"	Caroline Lost; Jez Ashurst	Original	3:36

Notes

- The album was released as a deluxe edition, which included a DVD of the music videos for the songs featured on the album.

== Charts ==
=== Weekly charts ===
Weekly chart performance for The Hits
Chart (2009)	Peak position
Irish Albums (IRMA)	19
UK Albums (OCC)	7

=== Year-end charts ===
2009 year-end chart performance for The Hits
Chart (2009)	Position
UK Albums (OCC)	26

2010 year-end chart performance for The Hits
Chart (2010)	Position
UK Albums (OCC)	165

== Certifications ==
Certifications for The Hits
Region	Certification	Certified units/sales
Ireland (IRMA)	Gold	7,500^{^}
United Kingdom (BPI)	2× Platinum	600,000^{^}
^{^} Shipments figures based on certification alone.

== Release history ==
The Hits release history
Region	Date	Edition(s)	Format(s)	Label	Ref.
United Kingdom	16 November 2009	Standard	CD; digital download	19; RCA; Sony	
United Kingdom	16 November 2009	Deluxe	CD; digital download; DVD	19; RCA; Sony	
