= Echoes Tour =

2011–12 concert tour by Will Young

- Tour by Will Young
- Cover of tour programme
- Associated album: Echoes
- Start date: 27 October 2011
- End date: 28 July 2012
- Legs: 2
- No. of shows: 38 in Europe

Will Young concert chronology
- The Hits Tour (2009-10); Echoes Tour (2011-12); Love Revolution Tour (2015)

The Echoes Tour (also known as Echoes Live) is the fifth headlining tour by English recording artist, Will Young. The tour supported his fifth studio album, Echoes. Beginning October 2011, the tour played 24 shows in the United Kingdom and Ireland. Additional shows were added in 2012, with Young performing at various outdoors events.

== Background ==
The tour was announced on 4 July 2011 via newsletter from Young's team. During an interview on Loose Women, the singer stated he chose to play intimate venues on the tour as opposed to his normal arena shows. The tour commenced on 27 October 2011 at the Oasis Leisure Centre in Swindon, Wales. While on tour, a YouTube channel, Echoestourdiaries was created by bandmember Adam Wakeman. The channel features seven behind the scenes videos of the tour, shot with an iPhone. The first round of dates concluded on 26 November 2011 at St David's Hall in Cardiff, Wales. On 12 December 2011, Young gave an exclusive performance at the famed London Palladium. The show was to celebrate the success of the album with his fans. Following the performance, additional dates were added for the summer of 2012. Dubbed the Echoes Forestry Tour, Young played six concerts for the Forestry Commission's annual music event. Commenting on the extension, Young stated: "The forest gigs have a great reputation for their atmosphere so I'm really looking forward to performing my songs in such unique settings". Additional festival shows and inmate gigs were added for June and July 2012. The staging for the 2012 shows featured a backdrop of various clothing items.

== Opening acts ==
- Jodie Marie (select shows)
- Lawson (select shows—2011)
- Nerina Pallot (select shows—2012)

== Setlist ==
2011
1. "Come On"
2. "I Just Want a Lover"
3. "Hearts on Fire"
4. "Changes"
5. "Your Game"
6. "Light My Fire"
7. "Safe from Harm"
8. "Outsider"
9. "Silent Valentine"
10. "Losing Myself"
11. "Personal Thunder"
12. "Who Am I"
13. "You and I"
14. "Switch It On"
15. "Leave Right Now"

Encore

16. "Running Up That Hill"
17. "Evergreen"
18. "Jealousy"
2012
1. "Runaway"
2. "Come On"
3. "Changes"
4. "Hearts on Fire"
5. "Losing Myself"
6. "Who Am I"
7. "You and I"
8. "AMY"
9. "Running Up That Hill"
10. "All Time Love"
11. "Light My Fire"
12. "Your Game"
13. "Grace"
14. "Switch It On"
15. "Leave Right Now"

Encore

16. "Silent Valentine"
17. "Jealousy"
18. "You Don't Know"

== Tour dates ==
Date	City	Country	Venue
Europe
27 October 2011	Swindon	England	Oasis Leisure Centre
28 October 2011	Bournemouth	England	Windsor Hall
30 October 2011	Belfast	Northern Ireland	Waterfront Hall
31 October 2011	Dublin	Ireland	Olympia Theatre
2 November 2011	Nottingham	England	Nottingham Royal Concert Hall
3 November 2011	Oxford	England	New Theatre Oxford
4 November 2011	Ipswich	England	Regent Theatre
6 November 2011	Liverpool	England	Liverpool Empire Theatre
7 November 2011	Blackpool	England	Opera House Theatre
8 November 2011	Sheffield	England	Sheffield City Hall
10 November 2011	Aberdeen	Scotland	Music Hall
11 November 2011	Glasgow	Scotland	O_{2} Academy Glasgow
12 November 2011	Newcastle	England	Newcastle City Hall
14 November 2011	Manchester	England	O_{2} Apollo Manchester
15 November 2011	Llandudno	Wales	Venue Cymru Arena
17 November 2011	Brighton	England	Brighton Centre
18 November 2011	Cambridge	England	Cambridge Corn Exchange
20 November 2011	Birmingham	England	O_{2}Academy Birmingham
21 November 2011	London	England	O_{2} Shepherd's Bush Empire
22 November 2011	London	England	O_{2} Shepherd's Bush Empire
24 November 2011	Westcliff-on-Sea	England	Cliffs Pavilion
25 November 2011	Plymouth	England	Plymouth Pavilions
26 November 2011	Cardiff	Wales	St David's Hall
12 December 2011	London	England	London Palladium
15 June 2012^{[A]}	Edwinstowe	England	Sherwood Forest
16 June 2012^{[A]}	Brandon	England	Thetford Forest
19 June 2012^{[B]}	Manchester	England	Band on the Wall
22 June 2012^{[A]}	Tetbury	England	Westonbirt Arboretum
23 June 2012^{[A]}	Flimwell	England	Bedgebury National Pinetum
29 June 2012^{[A]}	Pickering	England	Dalby Forest
30 June 2012^{[A]}	Rugeley	England	Cannock Chase
1 July 2012^{[C]}	Great Tew	England	Great Tew Estate
6 July 2012^{[A]}	Frodsham	England	Delamere Forest
7 July 2012^{[D]}	London	England	Royal Botanic Gardens
12 July 2012^{[E]}	Epsom	England	Epsom Downs Racecourse
21 July 2012^{[F]}	Liverpool	England	Liverpool Echo Arena
22 July 2012^{[G]}	Manchester	England	Manchester Arena
28 July 2012^{[H]}	London	England	Hyde Park

Festivals and other miscellaneous performances

^{A} These concerts were a part of the "Forestry Commission Live Music"
^{B} This concert was a part of "Love, Live, Music"
^{C} This concert was a part of the "Cornbury Music Festival"
^{D} This concert was a part of "Kew the Music"
^{E} This concert was a part of "Epsom Live!"
^{F} This concert was a part of "Radio City Live"
^{G} This concert was a part of "Key 103 Live"
^{H} This concert was a part of "BT London Live"

=== Box office score data ===
Venue	City	Tickets sold / Available	Gross revenue
Waterfront Hall	Belfast	1,894 / 1,894 (100%)	$106,549
Olympia Theatre	Dublin	1,165 / 1,165 (100%)	$71,410

== Critical reception ==
The tour received positive reviews from music critics in England and Wales. Daniel Bonnington (Nottingham Post) wrote of the Nottingham show, "While some talent show winners, including Steve Brookstein, Shayne Ward and Leon Jackson have disappeared, this shy lad turned pop prince showed why he's still here, 10 years on". For the concert at the O_{2} Apollo Manchester, Liam Buckley (Virgin RedRoom) stated, "Attending the gig at the O_{2} Apollo in Manchester brought me to realise his purely unique sound, one that can be easily enjoyed by anybody. I was quite impressed by his ability to remain calm and composed during his performance and despite the increasing sound of the instruments surrounding him, he never feels the need to scream and shout".

Mark Drew (Express & Star) viewed the Birmingham concert at the O_{2} Academy Birmingham. He writes, "This Pop Idol is all about the voice, which was good a decade ago and is just incredible now. There were plenty of upbeat moments as Young performed tracks from his more dancy album Echoes, especially the finale single 'Jealousy'". In London, James Lachno (The Daily Telegraph) gave the show at the O_{2} Shepherd's Bush Empire four out of five stars. He says, "Dressed head to toe in black, Young seemed relaxed and confident in the new sound, while his controlled, pitch-perfect quiver eased comfortably into third gear. It was sedate but impressive, prioritising rhythm and mood, and felt well suited to the intimate stage at the O_{2} Empire. On his final song, the recent single 'Jealousy', Young came closest to marrying an explosive vocal with his designs on pop experimentation. While for now he is a very fine pop performer, one suspects it is this heady union that may yet bear the sweetest fruit".

For the final 2011 show in Cardiff, The Western Mail stated, "enduring success from the manufactured world of musical celebs|Fortunately the songs from Echoes are good; especially 'I Just Want a Lover' and 'Hearts on Fire' although I would have preferred a few more of the back catalogue of hits—he could probably have done all the chart songs plus plenty from the new album".

The good reviews continued for the forestry shows in 2012. For the concert at the Sherwood Forest, Megan Pengelly (Retford Trader and Guardian) writes, "Young gave a relentlessly energetic performance, transforming even the slowest of ballads into moments which filled the forest with atmosphere. Young was a capable host, interacting with fans and leaving the stage to perform closer to the crowd. If concert-goers left unsatisfied, it was only at the fact Young did not perform all of his numerous feel good hits". At the Bedgebury National Pinetum, Lynn Cox (Kent Online) stated, There is absolutely nothing negative to say about the gig, the beautiful venue, which was superbly managed and organised, is perfect for a performer like Will.The atmosphere was electric—the trickery and lighting on stage was fantastic—the whole gig and evening was just magical".

At Dalby Forest, The Scarborough News reported, "The highlights are plentiful, with an energetic "Switch It On", a soothing "All Time Love", a show-stopping Leave Right Now and the two nods to his Pop Idol days, "Light My Fire" and "Evergreen", showcasing his musical evolution. Many more reality TV 'stars' are sure to come and go over the next decade but the smart money would be on Young outlasting them all".
