= Love Revolution Tour =

2015 concert tour by Will Young

- Tour by Will Young
- Promotional poster for tour
- Associated album: 85% Proof
- Start date: 29 October 2015
- End date: 29 November 2015
- Legs: 1
- No. of shows: 23 in Europe

Will Young concert chronology
- Echoes Tour (2011-12); Love Revolution Tour (2015)

The Love Revolution Tour is the sixth headlining tour by English recording artist, Will Young. The tour supports his sixth studio album, 85% Proof. Beginning in October 2015, the singer will primarily perform within theatres throughout United Kingdom and Ireland.

== Background ==
The tour was announced in June 2015, a week after the album's release. It is Young's first tour in three years. After his 2011 tour, Young went on to star in a traveling production of the famed musical, Cabaret. Additionally, he released his autobiography, Funny Peculiar. He wrote political blogs for The Huffington Post and became mentor for up and coming musicians.

== Opening act ==
- Lemar

== Setlist ==
This setlist was obtained from the 11 November 2015 concert, at the Newcastle City Hall in Newcastle, England. It does not represent all concerts during the tour.

1. "Brave Man"
2. "U Think I’m Sexy"
3. "Runaway"
4. "Light My Fire"
5. "Thank You"
6. "Grace"
7. "Switch It On"
8. "You and I"
9. "Gold"
10. "Like a River"
11. "Changes"
12. "Your Game"
13. "Who Am I"
14. "Jealousy"

Encore

15. "Love Revolution"
16. "Joy"
17. "Leave Right Now"

== Tour dates ==
Date	City	Country	Venue
Europe
29 October 2015	York	England	Barbican Centre
30 October 2015	Liverpool	England	Liverpool Empire Theatre
1 November 2015	Plymouth	England	Plymouth Pavilions
2 November 2015	Brighton	England	Brighton Centre
4 November 2015	Birmingham	England	Symphony Hall
5 November 2015	Cambridge	England	Cambridge Corn Exchange
6 November 2015	Westcliff-on-Sea	England	Cliffs Pavilion
8 November 2015	Dublin	Ireland	Olympia Theatre
9 November 2015	Belfast	Northern Ireland	Waterfront Hall
11 November 2015	Newcastle	England	Newcastle City Hall
13 November 2015	Glasgow	Scotland	Clyde Auditorium
14 November 2015	Blackpool	England	Opera House Theatre
16 November 2015	Birmingham	England	Symphony Hall
17 November 2015	Ipswich	England	Regent Theatre
18 November 2015	Cardiff	Wales	St David's Hall
20 November 2015	Bristol	England	Colston Hall
21 November 2015	Llandudno	Wales	Venue Cymru Arena
22 November 2015	Manchester	England	O_{2} Apollo
24 November 2015	Oxford	England	New Theatre
25 November 2015	Swindon	England	Oasis Leisure Centre
26 November 2015	Nottingham	England	Nottingham Royal Concert Hall
28 November 2015	Bournemouth	England	Windsor Hall
29 November 2015	London	England	Eventim Apollo

=== Box office score data ===
Venue	City	Tickets sold / available	Gross revenue
Clyde Auditorium	Glasgow	2,480 / 2,620 (95%)	$138,590
Eventim Apollo	London	3,214 / 3,291 (98%)	$207,214
