= Andrea Martin (musician) =

American R&B songwriter and singer (1972–2021)

- Born: Andrea Monica Martin; April 14, 1972; New York City, U.S.
- Died: September 27, 2021 (aged 49) New York City, U.S.
- Genres: R&B; soul; adult contemporary; electronic dance music
- Occupations: Songwriter; singer
- Years active: 1989–2021
- Labels: Rondor Music (songwriter); Arista (singer)

Andrea Monica Martin (April 14, 1972 – September 27, 2021) was an American R&B songwriter and singer.

== Early life and education ==
Born in New York City, Martin was one of six children of Reginald Martin Sr. and Mavis Martin, grew up in East New York, Brooklyn, and graduated in 1990 from the Fiorello H. LaGuardia High School of Music & Art and Performing Arts, where she studied voice. Inspired by Michael Jackson, she wanted to be a singer-songwriter from childhood.

== Career ==
Martin was writing songs and appearing at Amateur Night at the Apollo before she graduated; she sang in the lobbies of office buildings to try to catch the attention of music publishers located there. In the early 1990s she was signed as a songwriter by Rondor Music.

Starting in 1995 with "Before You Walk Out of My Life", a hit song for Monica, she became known for writing hit songs, usually with partners, in particular Ivan Matias, a high school classmate with whom she wrote 1997's You're the One, a number one hit for SWV. Other artists who charted with songs they co-wrote included En Vogue ("Don't Let Go (Love)"), Toni Braxton ("I Love Me Some Him"), Angie Stone ("Wish I Didn't Miss You"), and Melanie Fiona ("Give It To Me Right"). Her UK hit songs included Leona Lewis's "Better in Time", Another Level's "Be Alone No More", and No. 1s "Breathe" (Blu Cantrell, featuring Sean Paul) and "Loneliness" (Tomcraft), both in the early 2000s. She also wrote non-charting singles for artists including Paloma Faith ("Trouble with My Baby"), Nelly ("Fly Away"), RBD ("Wanna Play") and Jennifer Hudson ("I Still Love You").

She was less known as a singer, performing primarily as a backup singer and later as a featured artist. In the 1990s she was signed as an artist by Arista Records. She released her only album, The Best of Me, in 1998. It was not a success, but the single "Let Me Return the Favor" reached No. 82 on the Billboard Hot 100, and her single "Share the Love" was remixed for clubs and reached No. 4 on the Billboard Dance Charts in June 1999. Also in 1999, she appeared in concert on BET's Girls Night Out, headlining with then-Arista labelmates Deborah Cox, Faith Evans, Monica, and Shanice.

== Personal life and death ==
Martin had two children. She died in a hospital in New York City on September 27, 2021, at age 49.

== Discography ==
=== Studio albums ===
Title	Album details
The Best of Me	Released: October 10, 1998; Label: Arista; Format: CD, cassette

=== Singles ===
==== As lead artist ====
Title	Year	Peak chart positions				Album
Title	Year	US	US R&B	US Dance	BEL (FL)	Album
"Let Me Return the Favor"	1998	82	32	—	—	The Best of Me
"Share the Love"	1999	—	—	4	—	The Best of Me
"Middle of the Night" (with Hani)	2006	—	—	—	—	Non-album singles
"I Still Love You" (with Switch)	2011	—	—	—	55	Non-album singles
"Someone Loves You Honey"	2016	—	—	—	—	Non-album singles
"We Are One" (with CJ Fly)	2016	—	—	—	—	Non-album singles
"Without You" (with TCTS and Boston Bun)	2021	—	—	—	—	Non-album singles

==== As featured artist ====
Title	Year	Peak chart positions					Album
Title	Year	US	US R&B	US Dance	GER	NZ	Album
"Set It Off" (Organized Noise featuring Andrea Martin & Queen Latifah)	1996	105	51	43	11	65	Set It Off soundtrack
"Money Talks" (Lil Kim featuring Andrea Martin)	1997	—	— (Note: "Money Talk" did not enter the US Hot R&B/Hip-Hop Songs, but peaked at number 40 on the US R&B/Hip-Hop Airplay.)	—	—	—	Money Talks soundtrack
"The More I Love You" (M.F.F. featuring Andrea Martin)	2002	—	—	12	—	—	Non-album singles
"So What" (Antigen featuring Andrea Martin)	2006	—	—	—	—	—	Non-album singles
"Story of My Life" (Disconfect featuring Andrea Martin)	2006	—	—	— (Note: "Story of My Life" did not enter the US Dance Club Songs, but peaked at number 21 on the US Dance/Mix Show Airplay.)	—	—	Non-album singles
"Higher Ground" (Hani featuring Andrea Martin)	2008	—	—	—	—	—	Non-album singles
"No More" (Hani featuring Andrea Martin)	2008	—	—	—	—	—	Non-album singles
"This Ain't Love" (Après featuring Andrea Martin)	2015	—	—	—	—	—	Non-album singles
"Sleep" (Michael Woods featuring Andrea Martin)	2015	—	—	—	—	—	Non-album singles
"Always" (Toddla T featuring Andrea Martin & Silkki Wonda)	2016	—	—	—	—	—	Foreign Light
"Magnet" (Toddla T featuring Andrea Martin)	2017	—	—	—	—	—	Foreign Light
"Right Now" (Rudo Brody featuring Andrea Martin & Dot Demo)	2017	—	—	—	—	—	Non-album singles
"Live Forever" (Nicolaas featuring Andrea Martin)	2018	—	—	—	—	—	Non-album singles
"Only for a Man like You" (Antigen featuring Andrea Martin)	2018	—	—	—	—	—	Non-album singles
"All I Want" (Secondcity x Paul Woolford featuring Andrea Martin)	2020	—	—	—	—	—	Non-album singles
"All My Life" (L'Tric featuring Andrea Martin & Sean Declase)	2021	—	—	—	—	—	Non-album singles
"Shut Up and Kiss Me" (Sankhab featuring Andrea Martin)	2021	—	—	—	—	—	Non-album singles
"Palm Reader (Remix)" (Frisco Cosme featuring Andrea Martin)	2021	—	—	—	—	—	Non-album singles

=== Album appearances ===
Title	Year	Other artist(s)	Album
"Set It Off"	1996	Organized Noise, Queen Latifah	Set It Off soundtrack
"Money Talks"	1997	Lil Kim	Money Talks soundtrack
"No Man Should Be Loenly"	2009	—N/a	Reggae Got Soul
"Catch Ya"	2010	Dennis	Blonde
"Drama Queens"	2011	Stress	Renaissance II
"What's the Point?"	2011	Stress	Renaissance II
"Take My Life"	2013	Pusha T	Wrath of Caine
"Nothing to Lose"	2014	Freemasons	Shakedown
"W.T.L"	2015	Redlight	X Colour
"Never See the Light"	2015	Flux Pavilion	Tesla
"Last Night I Dreamed"	2015	Pudgee	Unreleased 92–98
"We Are Not Broken"	2015	Men in My Head, I.O.U.	Fallen Ash
"Crying in My Sleep"	2015	Shift K3Y	Off the Record
"Me Pt2"	2016	Dot Demo	Outer Body Experience
"Always"	2017	Toddla T, Silkki Wonda	Foreign Light
"Beast"	2017	Toddla T, Stefflon Don	Foreign Light
"Blackjack21"	2017	Toddla T	Foreign Light
"Faithful Skit"	2017	Toddla T	Foreign Light
"Foreign Light"	2017	Toddla T, Coco	Foreign Light
"Magnet"	2017	Toddla T	Foreign Light
"Ungrateful"	2017	Toddla T	Foreign Light
"Won't Admit It's Love"	2017	Toddla T, CASisDEAD	Foreign Light
"The Getaway"	2019	Bas de Beer	Having Another Bailey
"Ain't No Use in Crying"	2020	—N/a	The Anti Valentine Album
"I've Got a Love 4 You"	2020	—N/a	The Anti Valentine Album
"The Good Man"	2020	—N/a	The Anti Valentine Album

== In the charts as a writer ==
Year	Song	Artist	Chart position			
Year	Song	Artist	R&B	Hot 100	Club	UK
1995	"Before You Walk out of My Life"	Monica	1	7	-	22
1995	"All I Can Do"	Tina Moore	48	-	-	-
1995	"Anything"	J. Quest	94	-	-	-
1995	"Hooked on You"	Silk	12	54	-	-
1995	"It's All About You"	Adina Howard	58	-	-	-
1996	"You're the One"	SWV	1	5	-	13
1996	"Only Love"	The Braxtons	52	-	-	-
1996	"I Got Somebody Else"	Changing Faces	49	-	-	-
1996	"Set It Off"	Organized Noize featuring Queen Latifah	51	105	-	-
1997	"Can't Let Go"	Laurneá	20	55	-	-
1997	"I Love Me Some Him"	Toni Braxton	9	19	-	-
1997	"Don't Let Go (Love)"	En Vogue	1	2	-	5
1997	"It's All About You" (a.k.a. "It's All About U")	SWV	32	61	-	36
1998	"Be Alone No More"	Another Level	-	-	-	6
1998	"Let Me Return The Favor"	Andrea Martin	82	32	-	-
1998	"Stay"	Room Service	63	-	-	-
1999	"Still in My Heart"	Tracie Spencer	36	88	39	-
2002	"Wish I Didn't Miss You"	Angie Stone	31	79	1	30
2003	"Breathe"	Blu Cantrell feat. Sean Paul	83	70	17	1
2003	"Loneliness" (a remake of "Share the Love")	Tomcraft	-	-	-	1
2005	"Make Things Right" (interpolating "Before You Walk out of My Life")	Lemon Jelly	-	-	-	33
2006	"I Wasn't Kidding"	Angie Stone	-	-	17	-
2008	"Better in Time"	Leona Lewis	-	11	-	2
2009	"Give It to Me Right"	Melanie Fiona	57	-	-	41
2009	"It Kills Me"	Melanie Fiona	1	49	-	-
2009	"Face Drop"	Sean Kingston	-	61	-	66
2010	"Tell Me You Love Me"	Leela James	71	-	-	-
2013	"Lose to Win"	Fantasia	39	102	-	-
2013	"Think About It"	Naughty Boy ft. Wiz Khalifa & Ella Eyre	-	-	-	78
2015	"Love Revolution" (interpolating "Share the Love")	Will Young	-	-	-	103
2017	"More Than Friends" (interpolating "Don't Let Go (Love)")	James Hype featuring Kelli-Leigh	-	-	-	8

UK chart data from polyhex.com
