= 85% Proof =

2015 studio album by Will Young

Studio album by Will Young
- Released: 25 May 2015
- Length: 36:02
- Label: Island
- Producer: Jim Eliot; Richard Stannard

Will Young chronology
| The Essential (2013) | 85% Proof (2015) | Lexicon (2019) |

Singles from 85% Proof
- 1. "Love Revolution" Released: 27 March 2015; 2. "Thank You" Released: 24 July 2015; 3. "Joy" Released: 20 August 2015; 4. "What the World Needs Now Is Love" Released: 27 November 2015

85% Proof is the sixth studio album by English recording artist Will Young. It was released by Island Records on 25 May 2015, in the United Kingdom. It is Young's first album since signing a new recording contract with Island Records in 2012, and his first studio album since Echoes in 2011. Inspired by experiences in the time between 2011 and 2014, 85% Proof is about challenges in Young's life: accepting himself, forgetting sadness, and living happily. The themes of the songs vary; while some are light, others are dark. The album is produced by Jim Eliot, who has worked with Young on his previous album, and Mimi Stilwell of Kish Mauve band, whom Young always works with. The writing process for the album lasted only 10 days, and the first songs were approved by the chief executive of the record company.

85% Proof debuted at number one on the UK Albums Chart with total sales of 21,321 copies in its first week, becoming Young's fourth number-one studio album. In Scotland, the album debuted at number two on the Scottish Albums Chart. Upon its release, 85% Proof received mostly positive reviews from music critics.

Four singles were released from the album. The first one single, "Love Revolution", premiered on British national radio on 27 March 2015. "Thank You" was released as the second single on 24 July 2015. The third, "Joy", was issued on 20 August 2015, and the final single, a cover of Jackie DeShannon's "What the World Needs Now Is Love", came out on 27 November 2015.

Young embarked on a 22-date tour called Love Revolution on 29 October 2015 to support the album. 85% Proof was re-released on 20 November 2015.

== Background ==
In 2011, Young released Echoes, which was a commercial success and became his third number-one album on the UK Albums Chart. Since then, he spent time on stages in the West End, received an Olivier Award nomination for his role in Cabaret, and taught music in his old school in Birmingham. He also wrote for the Huffington Post, and took part in activities in support of LGBT rights. During this time, he studied somatics, "which is about bodily energy", as he told The Guardian in an interview: "Human psychology and behaviour is fascinating, because the more I learn about myself the more I learn about other people. You understand things when you understand them. It makes me a better person, adult, boyfriend, son, everything".

From the beginning of his career to Echoes, Young had recorded five albums under a recording contract with Sony. While taking part in the film Cabaret in London in 2012, he met the CEO of Universal Music David Joseph, and Darcus Beese of Island Records, and left Sony, signing a new record deal with Island Records. "It was time for a change, nothing more. I’d seen out the whole deal – the whole six album deal with Sony – which I'm really proud of", he told Rob Copsey of the Official Charts Company, "I’ve also changed management from 19 which is a big deal after 15 years, and thankfully they’re just brilliant. It was time for a shake-up."

== Composition ==
In an interview with The Guardian, Young said that he got the idea for the record after recording his previous album Echoes (2011), and stated that "It was about mindfulness", since he had to do a lot of work on his own, and had learnt ways to understand the human body. The new music would not be influenced by the music on the charts, as he told the Daily and Sunday Express. Young stated that the album's title refers to the alcoholic strength of moonshine, which is difficult to determine: "I thought it was interesting that with listening to music, I don't know how good something is [until I try it], so it's like a fermentation process. It has to be tasted to be able to tell." Also, he noticed that he didn't have a clear idea about the album like the previous one, Echoes, "I don't overthink it. I just do what's happening that day." Hence, many different songs came out and Young just picked the ones he loved for the record.

According to Young, 85% Proof "is largely upbeat" and focused on making audiences happy with songs like "Brave Men", "Love Revolution", and "Joy". "This album is all about shrugging off unhappiness and accepting what I am", he said. The song "Like a River" is about the battle with his inner demons. Memories of the days being bullied at prep school inspired him to write the song. When talking to The Independent on the radio, Young highlighted its beauty: " 'You need to go, I need to let you go'. It was really empowering."

== Recording ==
In an interview with UTV, Young stated that the recording process is still a thrill for him, mentioning that "It’s the most exciting thing," and "That’s kind of why I take breaks from it, because if I was doing it the whole time, it wouldn’t mean so much." Also, he unveiled that he had completed the writing for the album in only 10 days without any samples, with Kish Mauve and his band, whom he did the last record with and who are "good friends"; the first three songs were immediately approved by the president of Island Records, Darcus Beese, after being sent to him.

== Promotion and release ==
On Good Morning Britain, Young announced that he was recording his sixth studio album. On 25 March 2015, he revealed the title and artwork on his Instagram page, having set up the account on the same day. The track listing was revealed on 30 March 2015.

The album's release was preceded by the single "Love Revolution", which had its UK radio premiere on 27 March 2015. The track, "Like a River", was released as a buzz single and made available before the album's release, along with an accompanying video. The video was released on 20 April 2015, through Young's official YouTube channel. Young also tweeted on his Twitter account about the video's concept. On 16 June 2015, a video for "Thank You" and the remix by French DJ and producer Fred Falke were released on YouTube and SoundCloud. The music video was filmed at Porchester Baths in London and directed by Nick Barleet. The single was released on 24 July 2015. Young later released two additional tracks as singles, "Joy" (August 2015) and the album's final single What the World Needs Now is Love (November 2015). A promotional music video for "Brave Man" was released to Young's Vevo account on 19 October 2015, but was not a single.

On 2 June 2015, it was announced that Young was embarking on his first tour in four years in order to promote 85% Proof. The tour was titled Love Revolution Tour.

== Critical reception ==
Professional ratings
Review scores
| Source | Rating |
|---|---|
| AllMusic | 3/5 stars |
| Clash | 7/10 stars |
| Digital Spy | 4/5 stars |
| The Guardian | 3/5 stars |
| Evening Standard | 2/5 stars |
| musicOMH | 3/5 stars |

Clash's Gareth James called 85% Proof one "of the most deliciously instinctive and relentlessly endearing pop music you'll hear this year" and concluded: "No matter where this particular career began, only the most churlish muso might fail to acknowledge the quality of this compact album. Will Young is in fine form and, on this evidence, about 70% great." musicOMH editor Michael Hubbard found that "what 85% Proof is, above all, is comfortable, with all the pros and cons that entails. While it'd have been nice to hear some different musical explorations underpinning that soaraway voice [...]85% Proof will delight fans that these days include royals, celebrities and not a few music snobs who'd otherwise have thought themselves rather above such inoffensive, polished pop fare."

Caroline Sullivan from The Guardian gave the album three stars out of five and described 85% Proof as an "album of ups and downs, [that] secures Young's position as an artist who's good to have around." She found that Young's "strength as a vocalist is the thread stitching together an album that is otherwise pleasantly all over the shop" and cited closing track "I Don't Need a Lover" as "This one is a piano ballad dominated by a vocal performance of silvery regret and loss. It's a reminder of how good Young can be (and how much he has influenced Sam Smith)." Stephen Thomas Erlewine from AllMusic noted that "Young isn't shy about operating in a post-Sam Smith world, happy to indulge in a bit of high-thread-count soul so melodramatic it feels operatic. Because he has vocal chops, this doesn't feel like either a stretch or thievery, and while it'd be nice if the slower songs were as sticky as the speedier tunes, this nevertheless maintains a classy, well-manicured mood throughout."

Lewis Corner felt that the "album comes across slightly scattershot by its conclusion, but Will's undeniably distinctive tone guides it through. His delivery is markedly more understated than what we've heard from him before, but its texture and inflection is all the more compelling for it. Sonically, 85% Proof may be a drunkenly drifting blend of genres, but it's Will's sober honesty and solid standing as pop songwriter that means it won't give you a hangover." Telegraph critic Helen Brown found that "Young is beautifully vulnerable on power ballads, but this record could have made more use of the original Pop Idol winner's talent." Richard Godwin from Evening Standard found that Young "sounds moderately pugnacious [...], piping and keening through a series of minor key disco numbers that speak of non-specific personal triumphs and bravery against odds. It's completely professional and as efficient as ever [...] Oddly for someone who won a singing contest, it's the voice that fails to convince – a scanty, amphibious thing that never bellows beyond the auto-tuned pitch of the former mentor he now rails against. I'm sure he's a lovely guy and everything, but this is terribly dull."

== Commercial performance ==
The album peaked at number 1 on the UK Albums Chart after selling 21,321 copies in its first week, marking Young's fourth studio album to top the UK charts. On the Scottish Albums Chart, the album made its entry at number 2. As of 28 June 2019, the album has sold 96,356 copies.

== Track listing ==
85% Proof track listing
| No. | Title | Writer(s) | Producer(s) | Length |
|---|---|---|---|---|
| 1. | "Brave Man" | William Robert Young; Jim Eliot; Mima Stilwell | Eliot | 4:03 |
| 2. | "Promise Me" | Young; Eliot; Stilwell | Eliot | 3:35 |
| 3. | "Love Revolution" | Young; Eliot; Stilwell; Ivan Matias; Robert Borrmann; Andrea Martin; Edmund Clement | Eliot | 2:58 |
| 4. | "U Think I'm Sexy" | Young; Eliot; Stilwell | Eliot | 3:29 |
| 5. | "Gold" | Young; Eliot; Stilwell | Eliot | 3:50 |
| 6. | "Like a River" | Young; Eliot; Stilwell | Eliot | 3:39 |
| 7. | "Joy" | Young; Eliot; Stilwell | Eliot | 3:28 |
| 8. | "Blue" | Eliot; Stephen Wrabel; Dan McDougall | Eliot | 3:34 |
| 9. | "Thank You" | Young; Eliot | Eliot | 3:39 |
| 10. | "I Don't Need a Lover" | Nick Jarl; Richey McCourt | Eliot | 3:47 |

85% Proof – Deluxe version (bonus tracks)
| No. | Title | Writer(s) | Producer(s) | Length |
|---|---|---|---|---|
| 11. | "Dare" | Young; Richard Stannard; Ash Howes | Stannard | 3:51 |
| 12. | "Where Are You Tonight" | Young; Eliot; Stilwell | Eliot | 3:24 |
| 13. | "You Keep on Loving Me" | Young; Eliot; Stilwell | Eliot | 3:50 |
| 14. | "Always on My Mind" | Wayne Carson; Johnny Christopher; Mark James | Eliot | 2:06 |

85% Proof – Re-release version (bonus tracks)
| No. | Title | Writer(s) | Producer(s) | Length |
|---|---|---|---|---|
| 15. | "What the World Needs Now Is Love" | Hal David; Burt Bacharach | Eliot | 3:09 |

Sample credits

- "Love Revolution" incorporates elements of "Loneliness" written by Ivan Matias, Robert Borrmann, Andrea Martin, and Edmund Clement.

== Charts ==
=== Weekly charts ===
Weekly chart performance for 85% Proof
| Chart (2015) | Peak position |
|---|---|
| Irish Albums (IRMA) | 38 |
| Scottish Albums (OCC) | 2 |
| UK Albums (OCC) | 1 |

=== Year-end charts ===
Year-end chart performance for 85% Proof
| Chart (2015) | Position |
|---|---|
| UK Albums (OCC) | 75 |

== Certifications ==
Certifications for 85% Proof
| Region | Certification | Certified units/sales |
|---|---|---|
| United Kingdom (BPI) | Gold | 100,000^{‡} |
^{‡} Sales+streaming figures based on certification alone.

== Release history ==
85% Proof release history
| Region | Date | Format(s) | Label | Ref(s) |
|---|---|---|---|---|
| Ireland | 22 May 2015 | CD; digital download | Island | |
| United Kingdom | 25 May 2015 | CD; digital download | Island | |
