= Love Revolution (Will Young song) =

2015 song by Will Young

Single by Will Young

from the album 85% Proof
- Released: 27 March 2015
- Length: 2:58 (radio edit)
- Label: Island
- Songwriters: Will Young; Jim Eliot; Mima Stilwell; Ivan Matias; Andrea Martin
- Producer: Jim Eliot

Will Young singles chronology
"I Just Want a Lover" (2012)	"Love Revolution" (2015)	"Like a River" (2015)

"Love Revolution" is a song by British singer Will Young. It was written by Young and Kish Mauve members Mima Stilwell and Jim Elliott for his sixth studio album 85% Proof (2015), while production was helmed by the latter. The song features lyrics and melody from the song "Share the Love," written by Ivan Matias and Andrea Martin, which was originally released on Martin's Arista Records debut album The Best of Me in 1998 and later re-worked into the track "Loneliness" by German DJ Tomcraft. Due to the inclusion of the sample, Matias and Martin are also credited as songwriters. Released by Island Records as the album's first single on 30 March 2015, it reached number 103 on the UK Singles Chart.

== Background ==
"Love Revolution" was written by Young and Kish Mauve members Mima Stilwell and Jim Elliott, while production was helmed by the latter. The song features lyrics and melody from the song "Loneliness" by German DJ Tomcraft which in turn samples from the song "Share the Love," originally and written by Ivan Matias and Andrea Martin for Martin's Arista Records debut album The Best of Me (1998). Commenting on the sample, Young said: "I didn't set out to do any samples, it's all about the music, if something comes up that works in the song, then it works in the song [...] It's a great track, it came about because Jim Eliot, who does the music from Kish Mauve, came back and said "look I've flipped the track completely and we can do this" – and I said "that's awesome"."

== Critical reception ==
Idolator editor Robbie Daw felt that the song "pulls its influences from Motown, Northern Soul and legendary funk band Sly And The Family Stone, and allows for Will to completely cut loose, vocally. Like Adele, Mark Ronson and Sam Smith, we can now chalk Will Young up as another British artist currently steering clear of radio’s pure pop sound." Caroline Sullivan from The Guardian described the song as "get-happy R&B clappiness." Mark Goggin from The Gay UK found that "Love Revolution" "throws us a funkier sound that we haven't seen from [Young] in a while, slightly nodding back to the soulful elements of his 2005 album Keep On [...] Much less Euro dance though, I'm afraid, but much more summer soul that will get you dancing around your garden in no time at all."

== Music video ==
A video for "Love Revolution" was directed by Chino Moya and premiered on Young's Vevo channel on 30 March 2015. The clip depicts Young as a "grinning, evangelical" salesman trying to shift his faceless Love Revolution products to his "brain-dead followers."

== Credits and personnel ==
- Jim Eliot – producer, writer
- Stuart Hawkes – mastering engineer
- Andrea Martin – writer (sample)
- Ivan Matias – writer (sample)
- Mark Rankin – mixing engineer
- Mima Stilwell – writer
- Will Young – vocals, writer

== Charts ==
Chart performance for "Love Revolution"
Chart (2015)	Peak position
Belgium (Ultratip Bubbling Under Flanders)	31
Belgium (Ultratip Bubbling Under Wallonia)	23
UK Singles (OCC)	103

== Release history ==
Release history for "Love Revolution"
Region	Date	Label	Format	Ref(s)
Various	27 March 2015	Island	Digital download; streaming	
