= Senator Elliott =

Senator Elliott or Eliot may refer to:

- Chris Elliott (politician), Alabama State Senate
- Dick Elliott (politician) (1935–2014), South Carolina State Senate
- Douglas Hemphill Elliott (1921–1960), Pennsylvania State Senate
- H. A. Elliott (1890–1939), Arizona State Senate
- James T. Elliott (1823–1875), Arkansas State Senate
- Jehu Elliott (1813–1876), Indiana State Senate
- Jim Elliott (born 1942), Montana State Senate
- John Elliott (Georgia politician) (1773–1827), U.S. Senator from Georgia from 1819 to 1825
- Joyce Elliott (born 1951), Arkansas State Senate
- Robert Elliott (Victorian politician) (1884–1950), Senate of Australia
- Samuel Atkins Eliot (politician) (1798–1862), Massachusetts State Senate
- Thomas D. Eliot (1808–1870), Massachusetts State Senate
