= Hopes and Fears (disambiguation) =

Hopes and Fears is a 2004 album by Keane.

Hopes and Fears may also refer to:

- Hopes and Fears Tour, a tour by Keane in support of the above album
- Hopes and Fears (Art Bears album), 1978
- "Hopes & Fears", a 2009 song by Will Young

== See also ==
- "Hope and Fear", an episode of the television series Star Trek: Voyager
