= My Love (Will Young song) =

- Remix single cover

Single by Will Young

from the album Lexicon
- Released: 24 May 2019
- Length: 3:38
- Label: Cooking Vinyl
- Songwriter(s): Jim Elliott; Mima Stilwell; Will Young
- Producer(s): Richard X

Will Young singles chronology
"All the Songs" (2019)	"My Love" (2019)	"Forever" (2020)

"My Love" is a song by British singer Will Young. It was written by Young and Kish Mauve members Mima Stilwell and Jim Elliott for his seventh studio album Lexicon (2019), while production was helmed by Richard X. The second single to precede Lexicon, it was released by Cooking Vinyl on 24 May 2019 and reached number 45 on the UK Singles Downloads Chart. A remix single, featuring additional production by underground tech house duo The Last Indigo and James "F9" Wiltshire, was issued on 7 June 2019.

== Background ==
"All the Songs" was written by Young along with frequent collaborators, Kish Mauve members Mima Stilwell and Jim Elliott. Production on the track was helmed by Richard X with whom Young had previously worked on his fifth studio Echoes (2011). Speaking about the song, Young told Attitude: "When we were writing, I kept thinking of the chequered floors of a disco. That’s what was in my head. And it’s slightly Jamiroquai, I think."

== Critical reception ==
Gay Times described "My Love" as "a dancefloor-ready heartbreak banger." In her review of parent album Lexicon, musicOMH critic Helen Clarke called "My Love" a "brassy pop song, and this is where [Young] thrives."

== Chart performance ==
"My Love" debuted at number 91 on the UK Singles Downloads Chart in the week of 6 June 2019. It eventually peaked at number 45 in the week ending 4 July 2019.

== Music video ==
Young reteamed with photographer and director Rankin, director of the music video for his previous single "All the Songs" (2019), to film a video "My Love." Released on 12 June 2019, it was shot on Worthing Pier in Worthing, West Sussex, England in May 2019. Young described the visuals as a "Northern Soul-inspired thing that I’ve wanted to do for ages. Rankin’s just fantastic to collaborate with."

== Track listing ==
All tracks written by Jim Elliott, Mima Stilwell, and Will Young.

Digital single
No.	Title	Producer(s)	Length
1.	"My Love"	Richard X	3:38
2.	"All the Songs"	Richard X	3:52

Remix single
No.	Title	Producer(s)	Length
1.	"My Love" (The Last Indigo remix)	Richard X; The Last Indigo^{[a]}	4:17
2.	"My Love" (F9 remix – radio edit)	Richard X; James "F9" Wiltshire^{[a]}	3:29
3.	"My Love" (F9 remix – club edit)	Richard X; F9^{[a]}	7:45
4.	"My Love" (AJ Romeno remix – radio edit)	Richard X; AJ Romeno^{[a]}	3:44

Notes

- ^{^[a]} signifies an additional producer

== Credits and personnel ==
- Jim Eliot – writer
- Pete Hofmann – mixing
- Alex Maedows – bass guitar
- Mima Stilwell – writer
- Richard X – mixing, producer
- Will Young – vocals, writer

== Charts ==
Chart performance for "My Love"
Chart (2019)	Peak position
UK Singles Downloads (OCC)	45

== Release history ==
Release history for "My Love"
Region	Date	Label	Format	Ref(s)
Various	24 May 2019	Cooking Vinyl	Digital single	
Various	7 June 2019	Cooking Vinyl	Remix single	
