= All the Songs =

Single by Will Young

from the album Lexicon
- Released: 22 March 2019
- Length: 3:52
- Label: Cooking Vinyl
- Songwriter(s): Jim Elliott; Mima Stilwell; Will Young
- Producer(s): Richard X

Will Young singles chronology
"What the World Needs Now Is Love" (2015)	"All the Songs" (2019)	"My Love" (2019)

"All the Songs" is a song by British singer Will Young. It was written by Young and Kish Mauve members Mima Stilwell and Jim Elliott for his seventh studio album Lexicon (2019), while production was helmed by Richard X. Released by Cooking Vinyl as the album's lead single on 22 March 2019, it reached number 24 on the UK Singles Downloads Chart.

== Background ==
"All the Songs" was written by Young along with frequent collaborators, Kish Mauve members Mima Stilwell and Jim Elliott. Production on the track was helmed by Richard X with whom Young had previously worked on his fifth studio Echoes (2011). One ouf of only a few songs Young wrote for Lexicon, he compared "All the Songs" with his 2011 single "Jealousy," calling it one "of the best songs. I have ever written. In my life."

== Critical reception ==
Attitude editor Will Stroude called the song "fantastic" and described it as "a melancholy slice of electo-pop heartbreak that recalls the understated brilliance of 2011's "Jealousy." The Times called "All the Song" a "classic Young — melodic and melancholic." In her review of parent album Lexicon, musicOMH critic Helen Clarke noted that the songs "starts with urgently delivered words almost spoken over a faltering piano before lunging into a bouncing, Robyn-esque banger. The lyrics bely a feel good, dance-floor friendly track [...] It's a bold start that lays out what Young wanted to do with this record; archive his struggles and announce his return to music with renewed enthusiasm."

== Chart performance ==
"All the Songs" became Young's second consecutive lead single to miss the top 100 of the UK Singles Chart. It however debuted and peaked at number 24 on the UK Singles Downloads Chart in the week ending 4 April 2019.

== Music video ==
A video for "All the Songs" was directed by Rankin and released on 22 March 2019. In the visuals, Young takes on an array of stripper personas, including a sailor, a biker, a cowboy and a businessman.

== Credits and personnel ==
- Jim Eliot – writer
- Pete Hofmann – mixing
- Alex Maedows – bass guitar
- Jamie McCredie – guitar
- Mima Stilwell – writer
- Richard X – mixing, producer
- Will Young – vocals, writer

== Charts ==
Chart performance for "All the Songs"
Chart (2019)	Peak position
UK Singles Downloads (OCC)	24

== Release history ==
Release history for "All the Songs"
Region	Date	Label	Format	Ref(s)
Various	22 March 2019	Cooking Vinyl	Digital download; streaming	
