= Loneliness (song) =

2002 single by Tomcraft

Single by Tomcraft
- Released: 12 September 2002
- Recorded: August 2002
- Studio: Elektroraum (Berlin, Germany)
- Genre: Techno; trance
- Length: 2:44
- Label: Kosmo
- Songwriters: Andrea Martin; Ivan Matias; Edmund Clement; Eniac
- Producers: Eniac; Tomcraft

Tomcraft singles chronology
"Bang Bang" (2002)	"Loneliness" (2002)	"Brainwashed (Call You)" (2003)

"Loneliness" is a song by German disc jockey Tomcraft. It was written by Ivan Matias, Andrea Martin, Edmund Clement and Eniac, while production was helmed by Eniac and Tomcraft. The song is based on an excerpt of Martin's 1999 single "Share the Love". "Loneliness" was released as a single in September 2002 in Germany and in April 2003 in the United Kingdom. The single peaked at number 10 on the German Singles Chart and topped the UK Singles Chart. British singer-songwriter Will Young sampled the song for his 2015 single "Love Revolution".

== Track listings ==
German maxi-CD single

1. "Loneliness" (radio cut) – 3:47
2. "Loneliness" (video cut) – 3:53
3. "Loneliness" (klub cut) – 7:50
4. "Schwabing 7. Phase (Where Are You Now)" – 4:25

German 12-inch single

A. "Loneliness" (Klub mix) – 7:50
B. "Loneliness" (MUC remix) – 5:51

UK CD single

1. "Loneliness" (radio edit)
2. "Loneliness" (Benny Benassi remix)
3. "Loneliness" (MUC remix)
4. "Loneliness" (CD ROM video)

UK cassette single

1. "Loneliness" (radio edit)
2. "Loneliness" (Cheekyness remix)

== Credits and personnel ==
Credits are adapted from the German maxi-CD single liner notes.

Studio

- Recorded in August 2002 at Elektroraum (Berlin, Germany)

Personnel

- Andrea Martin – writing
- Ivan Matias – writing
- Edmund Clement – writing
- Eniac – writing, production
- Tomcraft – production
- Robin Felder – vocal production
- Factor Product Designagentur – artwork

== Charts ==
=== Weekly charts ===
Chart (2002–2003)	Peak position
Australia (ARIA)	54
Australian Club Chart (ARIA)	3
Australian Dance (ARIA)	4
Austria (Ö3 Austria Top 40)	43
Belgium (Ultratop 50 Flanders)	23
Belgium Dance (Ultratop Flanders)	2
Europe (Eurochart Hot 100)	4
Finland (Suomen virallinen lista)	13
France (SNEP)	73
Germany (GfK)	10
Greece (IFPI)	13
Hungary (Dance Top 40)	13
Ireland (IRMA)	9
Ireland Dance (IRMA)	1
Netherlands (Dutch Top 40)	20
Netherlands (Single Top 100)	25
Romania (Romanian Top 100)	58
Scottish Singles Sales (Official Charts)	1
UK Singles (Official Charts)	1
UK Dance (Official Charts)	1

=== Year-end charts ===
Chart (2003)	Position
Australian Club Chart (ARIA)	22
Germany (Media Control GfK)	90
Ireland (IRMA)	64
UK Singles (OCC)	46

== Certifications ==
Region	Certification	Certified units/sales
United Kingdom (BPI) Sales since 2005	Gold	400,000^{‡}
^{‡} Sales+streaming figures based on certification alone.

== Release history ==
Region	Date	Format(s)	Label(s)	Ref.
Germany	12 September 2002	12-inch vinyl	Kosmo	
Germany	2 December 2002	CD	Kosmo	
United Kingdom	28 April 2003	12-inch vinyl; CD; cassette	Kosmo; Data; Ministry of Sound	
Australia	7 July 2003	CD	Superphunk	
