= Lexicon (Will Young album) =

Studio album by Will Young
- Released: 21 June 2019
- Length: 45:28
- Label: Cooking Vinyl
- Producer: Richard X; Eg White; Jimmy Hogarth; Liam Howe; Boy Matthews; Sermstyle

Will Young chronology
85% Proof (2015)	Lexicon (2019)	Crying on the Bathroom Floor (2021)

Singles from Lexicon
- 1. "All the Songs" Released: 22 March 2019; 2. "My Love" Released: 24 May 2019; 3. "Forever" Released: 24 January 2020

Lexicon is the seventh studio album by British singer Will Young. It was released on 21 June 2019 through Cooking Vinyl. The album's lead single "All the Songs" was released on 22 March 2019 and, with it, announced a supporting 21-date UK tour lasting throughout October.

== Background ==
The album has been said to reunite the team who executive produced his 2011 studio album Echoes. Furthermore, the album reunites him with Richard X, who produced his 2011 single "Jealousy", and Eg White, who co-wrote his 2003 single "Leave Right Now". Additionally, it is said to feature a track written by BRIT-award-winning singer-songwriter Tom Walker.

== Critical reception ==
Professional ratings
Review scores
Source	Rating
Albumism	5/5 stars
Evening Standard	3/5 stars
musicOMH	3.5/5 stars

The album received generally positive reviews from music critics. Commenting on Young's decision to release Lexicon with Cooking Vinyl, Elizabeth Aubrey wrote in the review for Evening Standard: "The freedom it has brought certainly suits him. Lexicon has darker, electronic underpinning than anything he’s done before [...] The project sees Young collaborating with other songwriters for the first time since his third album. He has boldly overhauled his sound and stayed true to his pop roots." musicOMH editor Helen Clarke described Lexicon as "a record for wallowing in after a break-up. It’s melodramatic [...] but it mostly feels a bit filler-y. Luckily for him, in the days of streaming and downloads, those opening tracks will be plenty to re-stoke the public’s love of Will Young, and hopefully provide a grounding for his next record. Electro Will is in there somewhere – as 2011's "Jealousy" proved – and we can't wait to hear from him again." Quentin Harrison, writing for Albumism, felt that "loosely defined as a sort of glossary for exceptional language or knowledge, it was wise for Will Young to elect “lexicon” as a designation for an album that manages to look back while moving forward with mature, compellingly rendered pop pieces."

== Track listing ==
Lexicon track listing
No.	Title	Writer(s)	Producer(s)	Length
1.	"All the Songs"	William Young; Jim Eliot; Mima Stilwell	Richard X	3:52
2.	"My Love"	Young; Eliot; Stilwell	Richard X	3:38
3.	"Scars"	Young; Liza Owen; James Earp	Richard X	3:30
4.	"Get Me Dancing"	Claire Anderson; Francis White; Jimmy Hogarth	Richard X; Eg White; Hogarth	3:43
5.	"Ground Running"	Felicia Adams; Aidan Martin; Sky Adams; Daniel Shah	Richard X	3:21
6.	"Dreaming Big"	Miranda Kilbey-Jansson; Elektra Kilbey-Jansson; Hannah Robinson; Liam Howe	Richard X; Howe	4:15
7.	"I Bet You Call"	Gavin Jones; White; Johan Gustafsson	Richard X; White	2:53
8.	"Forever"	Young; Eliot; Stilwell	Richard X	5:22
9.	"Freedom"	James Norton; Richard Philips	Richard X; Boy Matthews	3:32
10.	"Faithless Love"	Thomas Walker; Dan McDougall	Richard X	3:41
11.	"Say Anything"	Matthew Marston	Richard X	3:53
12.	"The Way We Were"	James Lavigne; Shah; Jamie Sanderson	Richard X; Sermstyle	3:48
Total length:				45:28

== Charts ==
Chart performance for Lexicon
Chart (2019)	Peak position
Australian Digital Albums (ARIA)	24
Irish Albums (IRMA)	73
Scottish Albums (OCC)	4
Swiss Albums (Schweizer Hitparade)	84
UK Albums (OCC)	2
UK Independent Albums (OCC)	1

== Release history ==
Lexicon release history
Region	Date	Format(s)	Label	Ref.
Various	6 August 2021	CD; digital download; streaming	Cooking Vinyl	
