= Mrs. Henderson Presents (soundtrack) =

Soundtrack album by Various Artists
- Released: 21 November 2005
- Genre: Soundtrack
- Length: 46:02
- Label: Sony BMG

Mrs. Henderson Presents is the original soundtrack album of the 2005 film Mrs Henderson Presents starring Judi Dench, Bob Hoskins and Will Young. The original score was composed by George Fenton. The album garnered a nomination for the BAFTA Award for Best Film Music.

== Reception ==
James Christopher Monger of AllMusic gave the album three and a half stars out of five. He said Fenton's score provided the film with "equal parts sentimentality and whimsy" and thought the jazz and pop from the 1930s revue had been "impeccably rendered" by Fenton and the rest of the company. Andrew Granade from Soundtrack.net found it hard to categorise the score, believing it amounted to a concept album that was more of "a recorded musical than a traditional movie score." Granade noted the album "perfectly encapsulates" the film and praised the songs written by Fenton, including "Babies of the Blitz". Granade concluded that the score was too in tune with the period, so that it "almost washes into the background" and Fenton had failed to put own stamp on the production.

Fenton's score garnered a nomination for BAFTA Award for Best Film Music in 2006.

== Track listing ==
1. Overture 2:59
2. Bored with Widowhood 1:32
3. "Letting in the Sunshine" – Will Young 2:16
4. Revuedeville 0:49
5. Persuading Tommy 1:59
6. "Sweet Inspiration" – Camille O'Sullivan 2:37
7. Vivian Van Damme 1:20
8. "Goody Goody" – Camille O'Sullivan and Will Young 4:44
9. After the Ball (Chas K. Harris) 1:25
10. Shilling for the Hour 1:57
11. Joyride 2:09
12. "The Fall of France: La Mareseillaise" – Thomas Allen 2:04
13. The Blitz: Bombing/The Grecian Frieze/Defiance 2:22
14. "Babies of the Blitz" – The O'Brien Sisters 3:02
15. "Blue Nightfall" – Camille O'Sullivan 1:26
16. The Girl in the Fan 1:09
17. "All the Things You Are" – Will Young 3:17
18. Elegy 2:33
19. "The Sails of the Windmill" – Camille O'Sullivan and Will Young 3:36
20. "Girl in the Little Green Hat" – Will Young 2:46
