= I.O.U. (hip-hop group) =

American hip hop group

- Also known as: Inside Our Universe
- Origin: New Brunswick, New Jersey, U.S.
- Genres: Hip hop
- Years active: 2009–present
- Label: Independent
- Members: Andrew Buckner; Isaiah McNeill
- Website: insideouruniverse.com

I.O.U., an acronym for Inside Our Universe, is an American hip hop duo from New Brunswick, New Jersey. I.O.U. initially started as two college friends from Rutgers who remixed Wiz Khalifa hit song Black and Yellow to the tune of Black and Scarlett, Rutgers' official colors. The song was a hit on YouTube and the duo started working full-time on music. Since then they've opened for the likes of Far East Movement and Rick Ross.

== History ==
Andrew Buckner and Isaiah McNeill founded the band in 2008 and upon graduating started working full-time on their music. The group was formerly known as Deuce1's and has since been renamed to I.O.U.

== Musical style and influences ==
The duo rose to preeminence under the stage name Deuce 1's during their freshman year of college when they released ‘Rutgers State of Mind’, their take on Jay-Z and Alicia Keys’ ‘Empire State of Mind.’ The song became a Rutgers anthem, and the following year Andrew and Isaiah linked up to record ‘Black and Scarlet,’ their take on Wiz Khalifa's ‘Black and Yellow’ which landed them the unofficial title of ‘Rutgers’ Official Rap Group’ by the student government.

A few months later, the duo changed their name to I.O.U., a name they felt was more meaningful, and produced and recorded their self-released album ‘Breaking Our Mind Barriers’ or ‘B.O.M.Bs.’ released in summer of 2011 on their website.

Since B.O.M.Bs., Andrew and Isaiah have opened for Far East Movement in Long Island, NY late September 2011, have performed at Six Flags' Frightfest in Jackson, NJ in early October 2011 and have released their second mixtape Love, Great.Humans in November 2011. They have also performed at the Under Armour 3rd Rail Jam Festival in Sunday River, ME late December 2011.

== Discography ==
Year	Album details
2011	Lo<3, Great.Humans...: Released: November 2011; Formats: CD, MD
2010	B.O.M.Bs.: Released: July 2011; Formats: CD, MD
