= Oasis Leisure Centre =

Leisure facility in Swindon, England

- Swindon Oasis
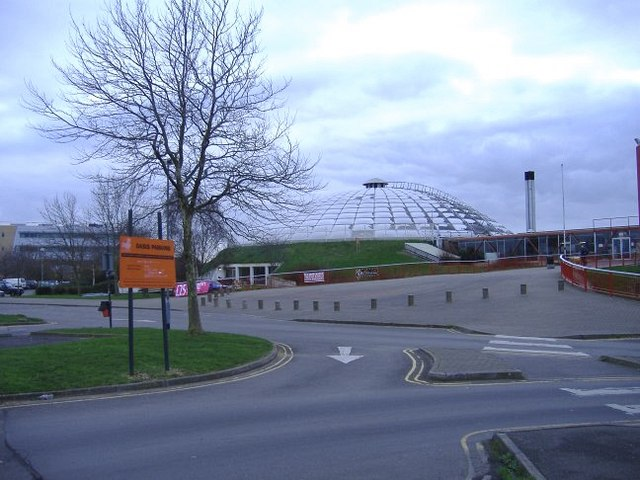
- Interactive map of Oasis Leisure Centre
- Location: Swindon, Wiltshire, England
- Coordinates: 51.567°N 1.791°W
- Owner: Seven Capital
- Capacity: Concerts (standing): 3,000; Concerts (seated): 1,620

Listed Building – Grade II
- Official name: The Oasis Leisure Centre
- Designated: 2 December 2021
- Reference no.: 1476563

Construction
- Built: 1974–1975
- Opened: 1 January 1976
- Closed: 18 November 2020
- Cost: £3 million

The Oasis Leisure Centre (commonly called Swindon Oasis) was an entertainment and sports complex just outside the town centre of Swindon, Wiltshire, England, with facilities including a lagoon swimming pool, gym, bar, and concert hall. It was in operation from 1976 to 2020.

== History ==
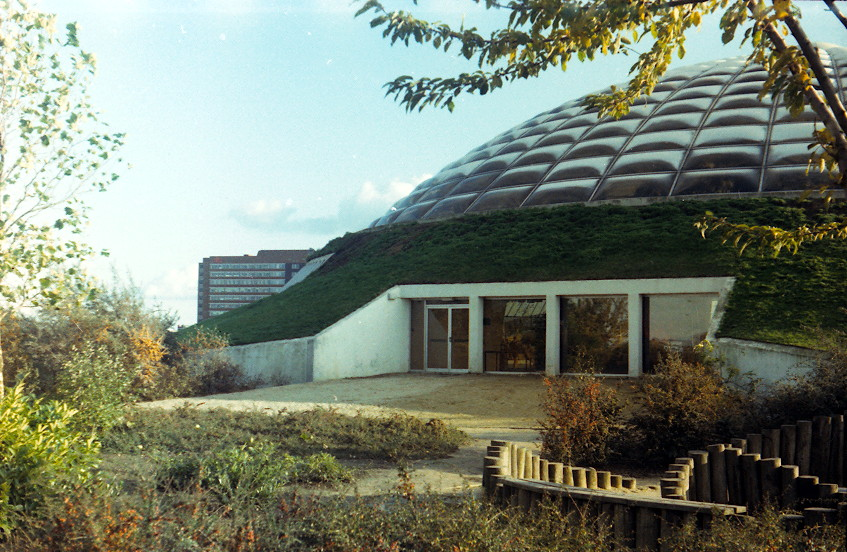
Swimming pool windows in 1984

The building was designed by Peter Sargent of Gillinson, Barnett and Partners for Thamesdown Borough Council, on part of the site of the former railway works. It was constructed in 1974–5 at a cost of around £3 million and opened on 1 January 1976. Its 45-metre (148 ft) diameter glazed dome, rising from a grass berm, is described by Historic England as "a sophisticated and architecturally striking structure which provides a dramatic setting for the pool within". The leisure pool was designed to appeal to families, irregular in shape, overlooked by balconies and decorated with artificial rocks and planting troughs. There were waterslides and a wave machine.

Alterations in 1987 added three enclosed waterslides, at the time the longest in the country, which were accessed from a tower outside the dome. In that year the Oasis was Wiltshire's most popular tourist attraction.

The concert hall became a major venue for touring acts and held approximately 3,000 people standing, or 1,620 seated. In the 1990s, the rock band Oasis took their name from the leisure centre after lead singer Liam Gallagher suggested it, having seen it listed as a venue on an Inspiral Carpets tour poster in the childhood bedroom he shared with his brother Noel. 20 years later, in 2011, Liam performed there for the first time with his new band Beady Eye. In October 2009, singer Morrissey was taken to hospital after collapsing during his opening song while performing at the Oasis.

The site is owned by Swindon Borough Council, which replaced Thamesdown in 1997.

== Closure and planned reopening ==
It was announced on 18 November 2020 that the leisure centre would be permanently closed, as a result of the COVID-19 pandemic.

In May 2021 the Twentieth Century Society placed the site on its 'Top 10 Buildings at Risk of Demolition' list.

In December 2021, part of the building was given Grade II listed status. The domed swimming pool and the earthen bank were included in the listing, while the sports hall, waterslides, launch tower and splash pool, the linking entrance block and the service structures attached to the south side were not. Historic England stated that the leisure pool, the fourth of its type to be built in England, was the earliest one surviving.

In April 2023, Swindon Borough Council and the leaseholder, Seven Capital, said that they hoped the venue would reopen in January 2026, a date chosen to coincide with its 50th anniversary of the grand opening.

Local group Save Oasis Swindon have worked with the Twentieth Century Society on a campaign to get listed status for the building, describing the centre as "iconic". In February 2024, the group held a protest to save the venue's sports hall, which had not been included in the Grade II listed status.

In May 2024, it was reported that Seven Capital were expected to submit a planning application in the third quarter of that year.

On 1 January 2026, campaigners put on a firework display to mark the 50th anniversary of the opening of the leisure centre.
