= Let It Go (Will Young album) =

Studio album by Will Young
- Released: 27 September 2008
- Length: 51:30
- Label: 19; RCA; Sony BMG
- Producer: Chris Braide; Ash Howes; Stephen Lipson; Mike Spencer; Richard "Biff" Stannard; Eg White

Will Young chronology
Keep On (2005)	Let It Go (2008)	The Hits (2009)

Singles from Let It Go
- 1. "Changes" Released: 15 September 2008; 2. "Grace" Released: 22 December 2008; 3. "Let It Go" Released: 2 March 2009

Let It Go is the fourth studio album by English singer Will Young. It was released on 27 September 2008. It is Will Young's first album in 3 years, since the release of Keep On in late 2005. The album has now sold over 400,000 copies certified platinum.

The first single released from the album was "Changes", which was released on 15 September 2008 in the UK, and peaked at number 10 on the UK Singles Chart. The second single lifted was "Grace", and despite heavy airplay on music stations and TV music channels, the single only managed to peak at number 33, Young's lowest peak position for a single at the time. "Let It Go" was the third single lifted from the album, released on 2 March 2009 only in the UK, and failed to impact the UK Top 40, peaking at number 58, surpassing "Grace" as his lowest-charting single ever. The fourth and final single released was "Tell Me The Worst", and it served as a club promotional single.

== Critical reception ==
Professional ratings
Review scores
Source	Rating
Allmusic	2.5/5 stars
The Observer	4/5 stars

'Let It Go was received extremely well by Observer Music Monthly, garnering four stars, wherein comparisons were drawn between Let It Go and George Michael's album Older. Allmusic editor Matthew Chisling found that "on his fourth release in the mainstream market, Will Young once again sticks to what he does best: produce material satisfying to the adult contemporary listener. Once again, he has done so while balancing soft-spoken ballads with effervescent fresh dance tunes pleasing to a general audience. As Young matures with every disc he releases, so does his music, as seen on Let It Go [...] Young's unique tone is there, but the true hits are hidden and the support is so irritatingly boring that Let It Go fails to sparkle like Young's prior albums have."

== Track listing ==
Standard version
No.	Title	Writer(s)	Producer(s)	Length
1.	"Changes"	Will Young; Francis White	Eg White	4:00
2.	"Grace"	Young; Matt Prime	Richard Stannard; Ash Howes; Prime^{[a]}	4:37
3.	"Won't Look Down"	Young; Patrick Byrne; Karen Poole	Mike Spencer	3:47
4.	"Tell Me the Worst"	Ricky Ross; White	Stephen Lipson	3:35
5.	"I Won't Give Up"	Young; White	White; Freemasons	4:01
6.	"Disconnected"	Young; Byrne; Aret Komlosy; Poole	Byrne	3:59
7.	"If Love Equals Nothing"	Young; Chris Braide; Poole	Braide	3:49
8.	"Love"	Young; Lipson; Poole	Lipson	6:32
9.	"Simple Philosophy"	Young; Byrne; Poole	Spencer	4:13
10.	"Let It Go"	Jeremy Gregory; Poole; White	White	3:39
11.	"Are You Happy"	Young; Byrne; Poole	Spencer	2:50
12.	"You Don't Know"	Young; Samuel Dixon; Sia Furler	Dixon	3:15
13.	"Free My Mind"	Young; Dan Brown; Stew Jackson	Robot Club	3:20

iTunes Store bonus track
No.	Title	Length
14.	"This Is Who I Am"	3:55

- ^{^[a]} signifies a vocal producer

== Charts ==
=== Weekly charts ===
Chart (2008)	Peak position
Irish Albums (OCC)	12
UK Albums (OCC)	2

=== Year-end charts ===
Chart (2008)	Position
UK Albums (OCC)	30

== Certifications ==
Region	Certification	Certified units/sales
United Kingdom (BPI)	Platinum	300,000^{^}
^{^} Shipments figures based on certification alone.
