= Keep On =

Studio album by Will Young
- Released: 21 November 2005
- Genre: Pop
- Length: 53:07
- Label: 19; Sony BMG
- Producer: Dan Carey; Johnny Douglas; Stephen Lipson (also exec.); Blair MacKichan; Pro J; Nitin Sawhney; Robin Thicke; Eg White

Will Young chronology
Friday's Child (2003)	Keep On (2005)	Let It Go (2008)

Singles from Keep On
- 1. "Switch It On" Released: 14 November 2005; 2. "All Time Love" Released: 16 January 2006; 3. "Who Am I" Released: 24 April 2006

Keep On is the third studio album by the English singer Will Young. It was released on 21 November 2005, debuting at number 2 on the albums chart in the United Kingdom, as the album sold 107,318 copies in its first week. However, its biggest sales were 132,109, in its fifth week when the album placed at number 13. This is also his first album not to go number 1. It is, however, his second best-selling album, with sales of 1,010,000.

== Critical reception ==
Professional ratings
Review scores
Source	Rating
AllMusic	3.5/5 stars
The Guardian	2/5 stars
Yahoo! Music UK	8/10

Allmusic editor Sharon Mawer found that "there was a mixture of styles on Keep On, from the salsa, holiday-inspired "Happiness" to the Justin Timberlake pastiche of "Ain't Such a Bad Place to Be," on which even the Indian-style intro worked well, to the ballads "Save Yourself," "Who Am I," and the final song, "Home," a haunting atmospheric track co-written by Nitin Sawhney. Keep On ran out of steam near the end with three tracks, all again co-written by Young but nothing more than album fillers, none of them having much of a melody [...] Altogether an excellent pop album from an artist who was maturing very nicely as the years went by."

== Track listing ==
Standard version
No.	Title	Writer(s)	Producer(s)	Length
1.	"Keep On"	Will Young; Stephen Lipson; Heff Moraes; Francis White	Lipson	4:44
2.	"Switch It On"	Young; Lipson; Ronnie Peterson; Karen Poole; Steven Wolf	Lipson	3:47
3.	"All Time Love"	Jamie Hartman	Lipson	3:54
4.	"Ain't Such a Bad Place to Be"	Blair MacKichan; Poole	Lipson; MacKichan	3:21
5.	"Think It Over"	Young; Johnny Douglas; Poole	Lipson; Douglas	4:38
6.	"Who Am I"	White; Lucie Silvas	Lipson	4:27
7.	"Happiness"	Shawn Lee	Lipson	5:16
8.	"Save Yourself"	White	Lipson; White^{[a]}	3:21
9.	"Madness"	Young; James Gass; Sean Hurley; Robin Thicke	Lipson; Thicke; Pro J	4:27
10.	"All I Want"	Young; Dan Carey	Lipson; Carey	3:53
11.	"Think About It"	Young; Lipson; White	Lipson	4:50
12.	"Home"	Young; Poole; Nitin Sawhney	Lipson; Sawhney	6:22

DualDisc version — DVD
No.	Title	Length
1.	"Entire album in Enhanced Stereo"
2.	"Exclusive documentary featuring special performances of "All Time Love" and "Happiness""
3.	"Featuring the sketches of: "The French Assassin", "Bollywood Elvis", "Bowler Hat" and "Zeppelin Pump""
4.	"Making of the video "Switch It On""
5.	"Interview with Will"
6.	"Switch It On" (video)

International version
No.	Title	Writer(s)	Producer(s)	Length
1.	"Keep On"	Young; Lipson; Moraes; White	Lipson	4:44
2.	"Leave Right Now"	White	Lipson	3:34
3.	"Your Game"	Young; MacKichan; Cruz	Lipson, MacKichan	4:10
4.	"All Time Love"	Hartman	Lipson	3:54
5.	"Switch It On"	Young; Lipson; Peterson; Poole; Wolf	Lipson	3:47
6.	"Ain't Such a Bad Place to Be"	MacKichan; Poole	Lipson; MacKichan	3:21
7.	"Think It Over"	Young; Douglas; Poole	Lipson; Douglas	4:38
8.	"Who Am I"	White; Silvas	Lipson	4:27
9.	"Happiness"	Lee	Lipson	5:16
10.	"Save Yourself"	White	Lipson; White^{[a]}	3:21
11.	"Madness"	Young; Gass; Hurley; Thicke	Lipson; Thicke; Pro J	4:27
12.	"All I Want"	Young; Carey	Lipson; Carey	3:53
13.	"Home"	Young; Poole; Sawhney	Lipson; Sawhney	6:22

- ^{^[a]} signifies an additional producer

== Charts ==
=== Weekly charts ===
Chart (2005)	Peak position
Dutch Albums (Album Top 100)	85
Irish Albums (IRMA)	33
Scottish Albums (OCC)	5
UK Albums (OCC)	2

=== Year-end charts ===
Chart (2005)	Position
UK Albums (OCC)	34
Chart (2006)	Position
UK Albums (OCC)	38

== Certifications ==
Region	Certification	Certified units/sales
Ireland (IRMA)	Gold	7,500^{^}
United Kingdom (BPI)	3× Platinum	1,006,154
^{^} Shipments figures based on certification alone.
