= Hopes & Fears =

Single by Will Young

from the album The Hits
- Released: 6 November 2009
- Length: 3:19 (radio edit); 3:46 (album version)
- Label: 19; RCA; Sony
- Songwriter(s): Dan Moore; Dave Brayley; Stewart Jackson; Yolanda Quartey
- Producer(s): Robot Club

Will Young singles chronology
| "Let It Go" (2009) | "Hopes & Fears" (2009) | "Jealousy" (2011) |

"Hopes & Fears" a song by British singer Will Young. It was written by Dan Moore, Dave Brayley, Stewart Jackson, and Yolanda Quartey and recorded for his first greatest hits album, The Hits (2009). Released as the album's first and only single, it debuted and peaked at number 62 on the UK Singles Chart.

== Background ==
"Hopes & Fears" was written by Dan Moore, and Dave Brayley along Stewart Jackson, and Yolanda Quartey, two members of the Bristolian band Phantom Limb, who supported Young at his 25 July 2009 concert at Audley End, Essex, and on his 2009 tour. It features production from Robot Club who managed to get legendary 1970s session drummer Skip Wiseman out of retirement for this track. When asked in an interview with entertainment website Digital Spy what the song is about, Young said: "Ooh, I don't know really [...] pregnancy haha! The song was written by a friend of mine, Stuart, who I worked with on the last record too. I liked it and needed something for the Greatest Hits, but the stuff I've been working on for my next album is much more dance-pop and didn't really fit in."

== Music video ==
A music video for "Hopes & Fears" was shot in London's Millennium College during the second week of September 2009, and was directed by Chris Sweeney. In the video, Young appears as a pregnant man, which was the idea of Sweeney. In an interview with The Evening Standard Sweeney commented: "The song was about transformation, and I knew that a pregnant Will would be a good way to cause a stir."

== Track listing ==
Digital EP
| No. | Title | Writer(s) | Producer(s) | Length |
|---|---|---|---|---|
| 1. | "Hopes & Fears" | Dan Moore; Dave Brayley; Yolanda Quartey; Stew Jackson | Robot Club | 3:19 |
| 2. | "Love Is a Matter of Distance" (live) | Tim Christensen | | 3:00 |
| 3. | "Very Kind" (live) | Will Young; Robin Thicke; James Gass | | 5:30 |

== Charts ==
Chart performance for "Hopes & Fears"
| Chart (2009) | Peak position |
|---|---|
| UK Singles (OCC) | 62 |

== Release history ==
Release history for "Hopes & Fears"
| Region | Date | Label | Format | Ref(s) |
|---|---|---|---|---|
| United Kingdom | 6 November 2009 | 19; RCA; Sony BMG | CD single; digital download | |
