= Tomcraft =

German DJ and producer (1975–2024)

DJ Tomcraft
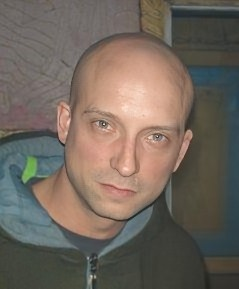
- Tomcraft in 2005

Background information
- Born: Thomas Brückner; 12 June 1975; Regensburg, Bavaria, West Germany
- Died: 15 July 2024 (aged 49)
- Genres: House; techno; trance
- Occupations: Musician; DJ
- Years active: 1994–2024
- Label: Great Stuff
- Spouse: Bine Brückner (m. 2000)
- Website: www.tomcraft.de

Thomas Brückner (12 June 1975 – 15 July 2024), known by his stage name Tomcraft, was a German DJ and producer. He specialized in progressive house and progressive trance music and is better known for having created the tracks "Loneliness", "Prosac", "The Circle", "The Mission", "25:17" "Silence" and "Overdose" working alongside Eniac.

== Life and career ==
Tomcraft began working as a DJ in Munich in 1994, shifting between techno and the emerging progressive trance style. He played his first major DJ gigs in 1995 at the Munich technoparade Union Move. In the same year, Tomcraft was one of the first artists to sign to the local label Kosmo Records, where he released his first track "This Is No House" and on which he was to release numerous EPs and albums in the years to come.

Tomcraft met fellow German producer Eniac in 1996 when they were both working at the Neutronic record store in Munich and the two started producing music together. The same year yielded the track "Prosac". Tomcraft and Eniac worked together as a studio team until 2004.

From the end of the 1990s to 2003 Tomcraft was resident DJ at Munich's techno club KW – Das Heizkraftwerk.

On 22 September 2000, Tomcraft married his wife, Bine Brückner, and the couple had three children. Their only son Max (born 2003) and two daughters Amelie (born 2004), and Sophie (born 2008).

In 2001, Tomcraft released his debut album "All I Got", which reached the German charts. In 2002, Tomcraft released "Loneliness", a progressive vocal track that topped the chart in the United Kingdom in May 2003. His DJ career was greatly boosted by this success, and Tomcraft released several club tracks, including Prozac and Overdose, with regular singles releases as well as four albums released across six years. He also worked regularly with English DJ/producer Tim Healey (formerly known as 'Coburn'). Over the years he also collaborated with artists such as Jimmy Pop (Bloodhound Gang's singer), the German Xavier Naidoo, America's Tommie Sunshine, and local rapper Sido. He set about building his reputation in the underground scene with the launch of Great Stuff and subsequent signings of such a talents as Lützenkirchen, Coburn, Oliver Koletzki, The Egg, and Ramon Tapia.

His other musical highlights over the years included playing to 1.3 million people at Berlin’s Love Parade in 2003, Japan’s Fuji Rock Festival, festivals in Brazil, and clubs in Singapore, Tokyo, Los Angeles, São Paulo, Rio, Cape Town, San Francisco, and several European cities.

In 2005 Tomcraft launched Craft Music, a record label and outlet for his own productions which focused on techno, electro, and house. The label housed releases from artists such as Spektre and Jimmy Pop.

His sound morphed over the years from trance into electro house and now since 2007 into a balance of those influences with a progressive house backbone, returning to the melodic sound that he came from originally.

Tomcraft released four albums, All I Got (2001), MUC (2003), HyperSexyConscious (2006), and For the Queen (2007), all on Kosmo Records.

His 2007 album, For the Queen, was a collaboration with Tobias David Lützenkirchen from their Great Stuff label, and while similar in style with previous Tomcraft releases, it is distinctive in a more narrative way, with less of the dance floor dimension of his previous works; he called it a "feature album" and it is rich with collaborations and two covers.

Tomcraft died on 15 July 2024, at the age of 49.

== Discography ==
=== Albums ===
- All I Got (2001) No. 97 Germany
- MUC (2003) No. 41 Germany
- HyperSexyConscious (2006)
- For the Queen (2007)

=== Compilation albums ===
- Tomcraft – The Mix (2003 remix album of other artists, with two exceptions, where other artists have remixed his tracks)

=== Singles ===
- "This Is No House" (1995)
- "Rollercoaster" (1995)
- "Viva" (1996)
- "Unicum" (1996)
- "Prosac" (1996)
- "The Circle" (1997) No. 52 Germany
- "Mind" (1997)
- "Gothic" (1998)
- "The Mission" (1998) No. 43 Germany
- "Powerplant" (1998)
- "Flashback" (1998)
- "The Lord" (1998)
- "Punk Da Funk" (1999)
- "Ezekiel 25.17" (1999)
- "Versus" (vs. Sunbeam) (2000) No. 50 Germany
- "Silence" (2000) No. 39 Germany
- "Prosac" (re-release) (2001) No. 50 Germany
- "All I Got" (2001)
- "Overdose" (2001) No. 38 Germany
- "Bang Bang" (2002)
- "Loneliness" (2002) No. 1 UK (2003 release), No. 10 Germany
- "Brainwashed (Call You)" (2003) No. 43 UK
- "Into the Light" (2003) No. 65 Germany
- "Great Stuff" (2003)
- "Another World" (by "Sonique On Tomcraft") (2004) No. 57 Germany
- "Dirty Sanchez" (2005)
- "Sureshot" (2005)
- "Quelle Heure Est Il" (2005)
- "Da Disco" (2006)
- "Sureshot 2006" (featuring Sido and Tai Jason) (2006) No. 34 Germany
- "Katowice" (2006)
- "Broadsword Calling Danny Boy" (featuring Jimmy Pop) (2006)
- "People Like Them" (featuring Xavier Naidoo) (2007)
- "Naked on Clouds" (2009)
- "Disco Erection Pt.1" (2009)
- "Disco Erection Pt.2" (2009)
- "Room 414 (Can't Get Away)" (2010)
- "A Place Called Soul" (2010)
- "Written High" (2011)
- "I Need Love" (2011)
- "Tell Mummy" (2011)
- "Taco" (2012)
- "Zounds of Arca" (2012)
- "Rock 'n' Roller" (2012)
- "The Noyz" (featuring Sam Obernik) (2012)
- "Supersonic" (featuring Sister Bliss) (2012)
- "Like a Roller" (2013)
- "U Got 2 Know" (2013)
- "Happiness" (with Ilira and Moguai) (2020)
- "Loneliness" (with Hardwell and DJs from Mars (2023)
