= Ivan Matias =

- Born: Ivan Matias; Brooklyn, New York, U.S.
- Genres: Pop, R&B, dance-pop, hip-hop
- Occupations: Singer, songwriter, record producer
- Years active: 1990–present
- Label: Warner/Chappell Music
- Website: www.facebook.com/IvanMatiasMusic

Ivan Matias is an American singer, songwriter, producer, arranger, hip-hop ghostwriter, and entrepreneur. He is primarily known for writing and producing hit songs for artists like En Vogue ("Don't Let Go (Love)"), Angie Stone ("Wish I Didn't Miss You"), SWV ("You're The One"), and Blu Cantrell ("Breathe").

Matias has also had four major label recording deals with Atlantic Records, London Records, Arista Records, and Elektra Entertainment. Only his Arista artist album was released and produced a No. 1 Dance Single "I've Had Enough". Matias has been featured on several soundtracks including Dr. Dolittle ("Do Little Things"), Set It Off ("Set It Off"), The Mod Squad ("Messin' Around") and Sprung ("Since You've Gone Away").

== Early career ==
Matias began his career as a backing singer and dancer for artists including Mariah Carey and Busta Rhymes. He went on to write and produce songs recorded by other acts including Lauryn Hill, Jay-Z, Pink, Dr. Dre, Curtis Mayfield, Janet Jackson, Nelly, Lil' Kim, Timbaland, Swizz Beatz, Outkast, Queen Latifah, Toni Braxton, En Vogue, SWV, Angie Stone, Blu Cantrell, Sean Paul, Az Yet, Traci Spencer, Fatboy Slim, Chico Debarge, Ray J, Changing Faces, Tomcraft, Xscape, the Braxtons, City High, Another Level, Jody Watley, Eric Sermon and Bette Midler.

His songs have been featured on television networks worldwide, including MTV, BET, VH1, NBC, FOX, ABC, CBS, BBC, and ITV. Matias' songs have also been performed on international television franchises including American Idol, The X Factor, Dancing with the Stars, The Voice, Emmy Awards, R&B Divas, and So You Think You Can Dance, as well as other commercial placements.

In December 2013, Matias' song "Don't Let Go (Love)" rose to No. 3 on the iTunes chart after Little Mix performed on The X Factor UK. Australian singer Greg Gould's version of the track topped the charts globally in 2017, alongside a popular music video. Matias put Gould in touch with En Vogue's Maxine Jones and the two re-recorded Gould's arrangement of the song as a duet and then embarked on a tour together in late 2017.
