= Switch It On =

2005 single by Will Young

Single by Will Young

from the album Keep On
- B-side: "I Love You More Than You'll Ever Know"
- Released: 14 November 2005
- Genre: Avant-pop
- Length: 3:47
- Label: 19; Sony BMG
- Songwriters: Will Young; Stephen Lipson; Ronnie Peterson; Karen Poole; Steven Wolf
- Producer: Stephen Lipson

Will Young singles chronology
"Friday's Child" (2004)	"Switch It On" (2005)	"All Time Love" (2006)

"Switch It On" is a song by English singer Will Young. It was written by Young, Stephen Lipson, Ronnie Peterson, Karen Poole and Steven Wolf, and produced by Lipson for third studio album, Keep On (2005). The song was released as the album's first single on 14 November 2005, a week before the album. The single reached number five in the UK Singles Chart.

== Music video ==
The video for "Switch It On" was directed by Vaughan Arnell and filmed at Thunder City in Cape Town, South Africa. It is based on the 1986 American action drama Top Gun. The video opens with the titles "Will Young in Hot Gun", and features Young in the Tom Cruise fighter pilot role, playing beach volleyball and serenading a woman in a bar. In a 2005 interview with The Guardian, Young commented: "The video was the director Vaughan Arnell's idea – I'd had something different, a performance video, in mind. But he convinced me it was such a universal idea that covered so many areas – blokes love it, women like it. It's not in-your-face homoerotic. Homoeroticism should be subtle. It's not about dancing in leather pants. Mixed with humour, homoeroticism is fantastic."

== Track listings ==
UK CD1
No.	Title	Writer(s)	Producer(s)	Length
1.	"Switch It On"	Will Young; Stephen Lipson; Ronnie Peterson; Karen Poole; Steven Wolf	Stephen Lipson	4:46
2.	"Switch It On" (Freeform Reform)	Young; Lipson; Peterson; Poole; Wolf	Lipson; Freeform Five^{[a]}	6:01

UK CD2
No.	Title	Writer(s)	Producer(s)	Length
1.	"Switch It On"	Will Young; Stephen Lipson; Ronnie Peterson; Karen Poole; Steven Wolf	Lipson	4:46
2.	"I Love You More Than You'll Ever Know"	Al Kooper	Lipson	5:16
3.	"Switch It On" (Freeform Reform)	Young; Lipson; Peterson; Poole; Wolf	Lipson; Freeform Five^{[a]}	6:01
4.	"Exclusive Picture Gallery and Will Young Screensaver"

Notes

- ^{^[a]} denotes remix producer
- "Switch It On" is based on the composition "Ho Diddley" as performed by Chitlin Circuitry.

== Charts ==
=== Weekly charts ===
Weekly chart performance for "Switch It On"
Chart (2005)	Peak position
Europe (Eurochart Hot 100)	18
Ireland (IRMA)	23
Scottish Singles Sales (Official Charts)	4
UK Singles (Official Charts)	5

=== Year-end charts ===
Year-end chart performance for "Switch It On"
Chart (2005)	Position
UK Singles (OCC)	131

== Release history ==
Release dates and formats for "Switch It On"
Region	Date	Format	Label	Ref(s)
United Kingdom	14 November 2005	CD	19; Sony BMG	
