= All Time Love =

2006 single by Will Young

Single by Will Young

from the album Keep On
- B-side: "My Needs"; "Easy"
- Released: 16 January 2006
- Length: 3:54
- Label: 19; Sony BMG
- Songwriter: Jamie Hartman
- Producer: Stephen Lipson

Will Young singles chronology
"Switch It On" (2005)	"All Time Love" (2006)	"Who Am I" (2006)

Alternative covers
- UK iTunes digital download (similar to UK CD2)

Alternative cover
- UK iTunes digital download

"All Time Love" is a song performed by English singer Will Young. It was written by Jamie Hartman and produced by Stephen Lipson. The song was released as the second single from Young's third album, Keep On (2005), as his ninth single overall. "All Time Love" debuted and peaked number three on the UK Singles Chart, becoming Young's ninth and last consecutive top-five hit as well as his penultimate top-five hit.

== Awards ==
The song was voted Song of the Year in the heat readers poll 2006. It was also shortlisted for the British Single award at the 2007 BRIT Awards, where it reached the final round of voting.

== Music video ==
"All Time Love", directed by W.I.Z, shot in Havana, was also made into a mini movie which served as a music video. A second video for the song appears on CD2 of the single release, as well as the DualDisc version of Keep On. In this video, Young portrays a skywriter who has written the words "All Time Love" in the sky and then parachuted from his aircraft, which is seen crashing in the distance at the end of the video.

== Track listings ==
UK CD1 and European CD single
No.	Title	Writer(s)	Producer(s)	Length
1.	"All Time Love"	Jamie Hartman	Stephen Lipson	4:01
2.	"My Needs"	Will Young; Paul Godfrey; Ross Godfrey	Morcheeba	3:56

UK CD2
No.	Title	Writer(s)	Producer(s)	Length
1.	"All Time Love"	Hartman	Lipson	4:01
2.	"My Needs"	Young; P. Godfrey; R. Godfrey	Morcheeba	3:56
3.	"Easy"	Young; P. Godfrey; R. Godfrey	Morcheeba	4:14
4.	"All Time Love" (special bonus performance)	Hartman		3:23

European maxi-CD single
No.	Title	Writer(s)	Producer(s)	Length
1.	"All Time Love"	Hartman	Lipson	4:01
2.	"My Needs"	Young; P. Godfrey; R. Godfrey	Morcheeba	3:56
3.	"Easy"	Young; P. Godfrey; R. Godfrey	Morcheeba	4:14
4.	"All Time Love" (live)	Hartman		4:18
5.	"All Time Love" (international video)	Hartman		3:53

== Personnel ==
- Tracy Ackerman – backing vocals
- Anne Dudley – conducting, strings arrangement
- Jamie Hartman – piano, writing
- Stephen Lipson – bass guitar, production
- Heff Moraes – engineering
- Mike Ross-Trevor – engineering
- Will Young – vocals

== Charts ==
=== Weekly charts ===
Weekly chart performance for "All Time Love"
Chart (2006)	Peak position
Europe (Eurochart Hot 100)	11
Germany (GfK)	69
Ireland (IRMA)	12
Scottish Singles Sales (Official Charts)	5
UK Singles (Official Charts)	3

=== Year-end charts ===
Year-end chart performance for "All Time Love"
Chart (2006)	Position
UK Singles (OCC)	58

== Certifications ==
Certifications for "All Time Love"
Region	Certification	Certified units/sales
United Kingdom (BPI)	Silver	200,000^{‡}
^{‡} Sales+streaming figures based on certification alone.

== Release history ==
Release history for "All Time Love"
Region	Date	Format	Label	Ref.
United Kingdom	16 January 2006	CD	19; Sony BMG	
