= Let It Go (Will Young song) =

Single by Will Young

from the album Let It Go
- Released: 2 March 2009
- Length: 3:38
- Label: 19; RCA; Sony BMG
- Songwriter(s): Jeremy Gregory; Karen Poole; Eg White
- Producer(s): Eg White

Will Young singles chronology
"Grace" (2008)	"Let It Go" (2009)	"Hopes & Fears" (2009)

"Let It Go" is a song performed by British singer Will Young. It was written by Eg White, Jeremy Gregory and Karen Poole and recorded for Young's fourth studio album Let It Go (2008). The song was released as the album's third single on 2 March 2009. It was Young's lowest-selling single at the time and his first to miss the Top 40 on the UK Singles Chart.

== Music video ==
A music video for "Let It Go," directed by W.I.Z., premiered on video sharing website YouTube on 11 February 2009. It features Young dressed up in a superhero costume, being arrested by two police officers. It continues with Young wandering in town alone and dancing with a mannequin he stole from a shop as if emphasizing that he indeed has no friend.

== Track listing ==
UK CD single
No.	Title	Writer(s)	Producer(s)	Length
1.	"Let It Go"	Jeremy Gregory; Karen Poole; Eg White	White	3:18
2.	"You Don't Know" (live from Cadogan Hall)	Will Young; Samuel Dixon; Sia Furler		3:31
3.	"Help Me" (live from Cadogan Hall)	Joni Mitchell		3:50

== Credits and personnel ==
- David Angell – violin
- John Catchings – cello
- David Davidson – arranger, violin
- Richard Edgeler – mixing assistance
- Jeremy Gregory – writer
- Love Sponge Strings – strings
- Karen Poole – writer
- Bobby Shin – recording engineer
- Jeremy Wheatley – mixing engineer
- Eg White – instruments, producer, writer
- Kristin Wilkinson – viola
- Will Young – vocals

== Charts ==
Chart performance for "Let It Go"
Chart (2009)	Peak position
UK Singles (OCC)	58

== Release history ==
Release history for "Let It Go"
Region	Date	Label	Format	Ref(s)
United Kingdom	2 March 2009	19; RCA; Sony BMG	CD single; digital download	
