= Jim Elliott =

American politician

Member of the Montana Senate from the 7th district
- In office January 3, 2001 – January 5, 2009

Chair of the Montana Democratic Party
- Preceded by: Jim Larson

Personal details
- Born: December 26, 1942 (age 83) Pottstown, Pennsylvania
- Party: Democratic
- Education: San Francisco State University
- Occupation: rancher, Green Mountain Conservation District Supervisor

Jim Elliott (born 1942) is the former chairman of the Montana Democratic Party and a former member of the Montana Senate, representing District 7 from 2001 to 2009. He was also a member of the Montana House of Representatives from 1989 through 1997, representing District 72.

In the Senate Jim served as Chairman of three senate committees, Taxation, Water Policy, and the Committee on Committees, which assigned senators to committees. Jim's worked with both Democrats and Republicans and gave him the ability to be a voice for Lincoln, Mineral, Missoula, and Sanders Counties and for the people of the State of Montana.

Honored twice by the Montana Library Association for his fight against governmental agencies' spying on law-abiding citizens (2001 Legislator Award, 2006 Pat Williams Intellectual Freedom Award), Jim is also a Fellow of the Eleanor Roosevelt Global Leadership Institute and the Arthur Fleming Leadership Institute.

Elliott lives in Trout Creek, Montana, He has a daughter living in Los Angeles and a dog named Xena.
