= Who Am I (Will Young song) =

2006 single by Will Young

Single by Will Young

from the album Keep On
- Released: 24 April 2006
- Length: 4:27 (album version); 3:37 (radio edit)
- Label: 19; RCA; Sony BMG
- Songwriters: Eg White; Lucie Silvas
- Producer: Stephen Lipson

Will Young singles chronology
"All Time Love" (2006)	"Who Am I" (2006)	"Changes" (2008)

"Who Am I" is a song by English singer Will Young. It was co-written by Eg White and Lucie Silvas and produced by Stephen Lipson for his third album, Keep On (2005). The track was released as a single on 24 April 2006. Songwriter Silvas based the lyrics on her then-boyfriend. She had wanted to write a song from a male perspective as opposed to her usual female perspective. "Who Am I" was shortlisted for the Popjustice £20 Music Prize in 2006.

== Chart performance ==
"Who Am I" entered the UK Official Download Chart on 12 April 2006 due to individual album tracks being available to download. It entered the UK Singles Chart on 23 April at number 47 based on download sales alone. Following the song's physical release, it peaked at number 11, becoming Young's first single to fail to reach the top five (and top ten) in the UK.

== Music video ==
The video for "Who Am I" was directed by Dougal Wilson. It features a montage of clips from Blue Peter from past decades, with Young superimposed over the presenters. Young confirmed in an interview with Top of the Pops that he received an honorary Blue Peter badge for the video.

Then presenter of Blue Peter Konnie Huq makes a cameo as a paratrooper who supervises Young on a slide from Tower Bridge whilst then pet Mabel appears throughout the video. One blooper occurs 35 seconds into the video when Young presents a homemade replica of Tracy Island. The model of FAB 1 shown is based on the 2004 live action incarnation even though the video is set in the 1970s.

The video was nominated for "Best Pop Video" and "Best Visual Effects in a Video" in the 2007 Music Vision Awards.

== Track listing ==
CD single
No.	Title	Producer(s)	Length
1.	"Who Am I"	Stephen Lipson	4:27
2.	"Who Am I" (The Chord remix)	Lipson; The Chords^{[a]}	4:57

Notes

- ^{^[a]} denotes remix producer

== Charts ==
Weekly chart performance for "Who Am I"
Chart (2006)	Peak position
Ireland (IRMA)	21
Scottish Singles Sales (Official Charts)	10
UK Singles (Official Charts)	11

== Certifications ==
Certifications for "Who Am I"
Region	Certification	Certified units/sales
United Kingdom (BPI)	Silver	200,000^{‡}
^{‡} Sales+streaming figures based on certification alone.

== Release history ==
Release dates and formats for "Who Am I"
Region	Date	Format	Label(s)	Ref(s)
United Kingdom	24 April 2006	CD	19; RCA; Sony BMG	
