= Steven Wolf =

American drummer

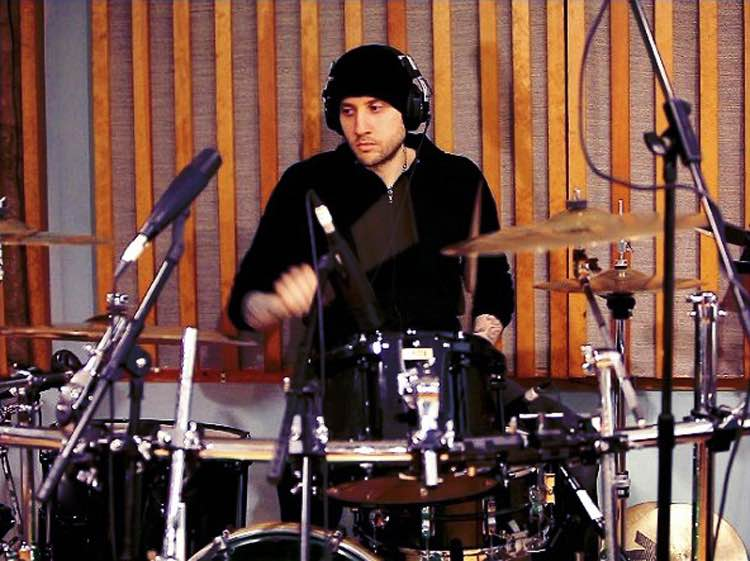
- Born: Philadelphia, Pennsylvania, U.S.
- Occupations: Drummer, drum programmer, music producer, songwriter, remixer
- Years active: 1989-Present
- Website: www.wolfedelic.com

Steven Wolf (aka Wolf) is an American drummer, programmer, songwriter and music producer. His discography includes numerous gold, platinum, and Grammy winning records. He has worked with a range of artists including Alicia Keys, Katy Perry, Beyoncé, Chaka Khan, Annie Lennox, Miley Cyrus, Pink, Aretha Franklin, Avril Lavigne, Britney Spears, Celine Dion, Bee Gees, David Bowie, and Grover Washington, Jr. Notable songs include Katy Perry's "I Kissed a Girl," Avril Lavigne's "Girlfriend", Miley Cyrus's "Wrecking Ball".

Modern Drummer magazine calls Wolf a "modern-day hit-making machine".

Wolf attended Berklee College of Music.

Wolf was featured on the cover of DrumHead Magazine in 2018.
