= Changes (Will Young song) =

Single by Will Young

from the album Let It Go
- Released: 19 September 2008
- Length: 4:00
- Label: 19; RCA; Sony BMG
- Songwriters: Will Young; Eg White
- Producer: Eg White

Will Young singles chronology
"Who Am I" (2006)	"Changes" (2008)	"Grace" (2008)

"Changes" is a song by British singer Will Young. It was written by Young and producer Eg White for his fourth studio album, Let It Go (2008). The song was released as the album's lead single on 19 September 2008, as a digital download, with the physical release a week later.

== Chart performance ==
"Changes" was premiered on 28 July 2008 on BBC Radio 2 by presenter Ken Bruce. For the week commencing 16 August 2008, it was added into rotation on BBC Radio 2. The song was immediately placed on the A-list, denoting heavy rotation. "Changes" also debuted on the first Today's 4Music Top 10 chart at number one on 18 August 2008. On 21 September 2008, it entered the UK Singles Chart at number 10. The week of 28 September 2008, the song fell to number 13, becoming his lowest-charting lead single from an album.

== Music video ==
A music video for "Changes," directed by Martin de Thurah, was shot on the 1 August 2008 on location near Tonbridge. According to his website, Young says "It has probably been the hardest video I’ve ever had to shoot. I ran up and down country lanes, was struck by lightning, set on fire and partially drowned. It’s amazing what you’ll do for music!" He continues, saying he had to drink foul smelling soup, dance in a hay-filled barn in front of a wind machine and also had to lay on rocks, soaked in freezing cold water. It premièred on Channel V on 16 August 2008.

In the beginning, Young seems to be in a deserted petrol station, filling up a petrol canister. He then looks around to find some more people sitting in their cars or sitting outside of it. Also in a shot, a cow is walking along the petrol station. The next shot features Young being in and around his house. He is having a drink, listening to music, and also sitting on the bed, looking out of the window. The next shot upstairs in his house shows him standing what appears to be naked in front of mirrors, singing along with the song. He then gets dressed again and slowly things in the room start to catch fire, including him.

In the next scene Young is throwing things into a big fire. He actually burns his motorbike and personal belongings like a book or photos. After that scene, Will is shown dancing and jumping around in a barn, with hay flying all across the room. The music suddenly stops for a second and a voice appears, asking him what he is doing in that barn. He then gets kicked out and the next shot features Will running along a lonely dark street. He looks at the sky which is filling with clouds. Little sparks suddenly appear on Young's shoulders and as he runs along the street he gets struck by a lightning.

He lays motionless on the street for some seconds. It also starts to rain very heavily. The last shot shows him opening his eyes and lifting his head.

== Track listings ==
Digital single
No.	Title	Writer(s)	Producer(s)	Length
1.	"Changes" (radio edit)	Will Young; Eg White	White	3:15
2.	"Let It Go"	Jeremy Gregory; Karen Poole; White	White	3:39

Remix single
No.	Title	Writer(s)	Producer(s)	Length
1.	"Changes" (Chris Lake remix)	Young; White	White; Chris Lake^{[a]}	7:08
2.	"Changes" (Superbass vocal mix)	Young; White	White; Superbass^{[a]}	6:42

Notes

- ^{^[a]} signifies additional producer(s)

== Credits and personnel ==
- Richard Edgeler – mixing assistance
- The London Studio Orchestra – strings
- Jeremy Wheatley – mixing engineer
- Eg White – writer
- Will Young – vocals, writer

== Charts ==
Chart performance for "Changes"
Chart (2008)	Peak position
Ireland (IRMA)	28
UK Singles (Official Charts)	10

=== Year-end charts ===
Chart (2008)	Position
UK Singles (OCC)	148

== Release history ==
Release history for "Changes"
Region	Date	Label	Edition	Format	Ref(s)
Various	19 September 2008	19; RCA; Sony BMG	Digital single	Digital download	
Various	22 September 2008	19; RCA; Sony BMG	Remix single	Digital download	
