= Grace (Will Young song) =

Single by Will Young

from the album Let It Go
- Released: 30 November 2008
- Length: 4:37
- Label: 19; RCA; Sony BMG
- Songwriters: Will Young; Matt Prime
- Producers: Richard "Biff" Stannard; Ash Howes

Will Young singles chronology
"Changes" (2008)	"Grace" (2008)	"Let It Go" (2009)

"Grace" is a song recorded by British singer Will Young. It was written by Young and Matt Prime for his fourth studio album, Let It Go (2008), while production was helmed by Richard "Biff" Stannard and Ash Howes. The song served as the album's second single and was released on 30 November 2008. Young performed the song on The X Factor on 1 November 2008, and subsequently on Children in Need 2008. The song can be heard accompanying NatWest adverts and was also featured during the Top Gear: Bolivia Special.

== Chart performance ==
"Grace" debuted at number 35 on the UK Singles Chart. It eventually rose up to number 33 in its fifth week of release.

== Music video ==
A music video, directed by Kinga Burza, premiered on 1 December 2008. Shot at Addington Manor Equestrian Centre, it depicts Young winning an equestrian competition.

== Track listings ==
UK CD single
No.	Title	Writer(s)	Producer(s)	Length
1.	"Grace"	Young; Prime	Stannard; Howes; Prime^{[a]}	3:31
2.	"Gonna Get It This Time"	Young; Stannard; Howes; Matt Rowe	Stannard; Howes	4:01

Digital EP
No.	Title	Writer(s)	Producer(s)	Length
1.	"Grace"	Young; Prime	Stannard; Howes; Prime^{[a]}	4:35
2.	"Grace" (Live)	Young; Prime	Stannard; Howes; Prime^{[a]}	5:56
3.	"Grace" (Fred Falke remix)	Young; Prime	Stannard; Howes; Prime^{[a]}; Fred Falke^{[b]}	8:19
4.	"Grace" (Tom Neville's Falling From Grace remix)	Young; Prime	Stannard; Howes; Prime^{[a]}; Tom Neville^{[b]}	7:13

Notes

- ^{^[a]} signifies a vocal producer
- ^{^[b]} signifies an additional producer

== Credits and personnel ==
Performers

- Chris Ballin – backing vocalist
- Beverlei Brown – backing vocalist
- Geoff Dugmore – drums
- Charmain Elliott – backing vocalist
- Claudia Fontaine – backing vocalist
- Hazel Fernandez – backing vocalist
- John Gibbons – backing vocalist
- Simon Hale – conductor
- Louisa Fuller – lead strings
- Millennia Strings – strings
- Phil Todd – saxophone, flute
- Fayyaz Virji – trombone

Technical

- Niall Acott – recording engineer
- David Treahearn – engineer
- Richard Edgeler – mixing engineer
- Ash Howes – producer
- Jez Murphy – producer
- Matt Prime – vocal producer, writer
- Richard "Biff" Stannard – producer
- Will Young – writer

== Charts ==
Chart performance for "Grace"
Chart (2008)	Peak position
UK Singles (Official Charts)	33

== Release history ==
Release history for "Grace"
Region	Date	Label	Format	Ref(s)
Various	30 November 2008	19; RCA; Sony BMG	CD single; digital download	
