= Stephen Lipson =

English record producer, guitarist and songwriter

- Origin: England
- Occupations: Record producer; audio engineer; mixer; guitarist; songwriter
- Instruments: Guitar, bass guitar

Stephen J. Lipson (born 16 March 1954) is an English record producer, audio engineer, guitarist and songwriter. As a record producer he has worked with many musical artists, including Annie Lennox, Propaganda, Act, Frankie Goes to Hollywood, Simple Minds, Will Young, Geri Halliwell, Jeff Beck, Billie Eilish and Hans Zimmer. He has also engineered, played guitar on, and contributed to much of the programming of many of the records he has produced.

== Record collaborations ==
- American Idol
- The Animals
- Annie Lennox
- Backstreet Boys
- Billie Eilish
- Blake
- Boyzone
- Brian Kennedy
- Bridget Jones's Diary
- Bridget Jones: The Edge of Reason
- Cher
- Children in Need 2014
- Clay Aiken
- Daniel Bedingfield
- David Cook
- David Jordan
- Diesel Park West
- Donald Glover
- Emma Bunton
- Foy Vance
- Frankie Goes to Hollywood
- Gary Barlow
- Geri Halliwell
- Gerry Rafferty
- Godley & Creme
- Grace Jones
- Hans Zimmer
- Hardwicke Circus
- Tomoyasu Hotei
- Hothouse Flowers
- Idina Menzel
- Jamie Cullum
- Jars of Clay
- Jeff Beck
- Johnny Marr
- Joss Stone
- Jordin Sparks
- Juanes
- Kelly Clarkson
- Lemar
- Lindisfarne
- Lionel Richie
- Marc Almond
- Meja
- Michael W. Smith
- Mike Oldfield
- Nasty Rox Inc.
- Natalie Imbruglia
- Nik Kershaw
- Notting Hill
- Paul Brady
- Paul McCartney
- Pet Shop Boys
- Poesy
- Pop Idol
- Prefab Sprout
- Producers
- Propaganda
- Red Sky July
- Robbie Williams
- Rolling Stones
- Ronan Keating
- Ronan Parke
- Ruth Lorenzo
- S Club 7
- Simple Minds
- Sophie B. Hawkins
- Sniff 'n' the Tears
- Sting
- Ultravox
- Vivian Stanshall
- Whitney Houston
- Will Young
- xPropaganda
- Zucchero

== Film collaborations ==
- The Dark Knight Rises
- Rush
- Superman - Man of Steel
- The Amazing Spider-Man 2
- The Last Face
- The Lego Batman Movie
- The Little Prince
- Risen
- Inferno
- In the Heart of the Sea
- Home
- Freeheld
- King Arthur: Legend of the Sword
- The Commuter
- Mission: Impossible – Fallout
- The Girl in the Spider's Web
- The Lion King
- The Boss Baby: Family Business
- Rumble
- Top Gun: Maverick
- His House
- No Time to Die
- Mission: Impossible – Dead Reckoning Part One
- Widows
- Dune: Part Two

== Awards and nominations ==
Year	Award	Credit
2022	Hans Zimmer, Lorne Balfe, Top Gun Maverick - won CAS Outstanding Achievement in Sound Mixing	Score Mixer
2022	Hans Zimmer, No Time to Die – nominated for CAS Outstanding Achievement in Sound Mixing	Score Mixer
2022	Hans Zimmer, Top Gun Maverick – nominated for Grammys Best Compilation Soundtrack	Mixer
2021	Billie Eilish, No Time to Die – won Oscar Best Original Song	Producer
2021	Billie Eilish, No Time to Die – won Golden Globes Best Song Motion Picture	Producer
2021	Billie Eilish, No Time to Die – won Grammys Best Song Written For Visual Media	Producer
2017	Lorne Balfe, The Lego Batman Movie – nominated for CAS Outstanding Achievement in Sound Mixing	Score Mixer
2013	Hans Zimmer, The Dark Knight Rises – nominated for Grammys Best Soundtrack Album	Producer
2011	Jeff Beck, Hammerhead – won Grammy for Best Rock Instrumental Performance	Producer
2011	Jeff Beck, Nessun Dorma – won Grammy for Best Pop Instrumental Performance	Producer
2011	Jeff Beck, Emotion & Commotion – nominated for Grammys Best Rock Album	Producer
2011	Jeff Beck, I Put A Spell on You – nominated for Grammys Best Rock Performance by a Duo or Group with Vocals	Producer
2011	Stephen Lipson – nominated for Grammys Best Engineered Album (Emotion & Commotion)	Producer and Engineer
2011	Stephen Lipson – nominated for Brits Producer of the Year	Producer
2011	Juanes, Yerbatero, won Premio lo Nuestro Song of the Year	Producer
2007	Will Young, All Time Love – nominated for Brits Best British Single	Producer
2005	Will Young, Your Game – won Brit for Best British Single	Producer
2004	Annie Lennox, Bare – nominated for Grammys Best Pop Album	Producer
1998	Jars of Clay, Much Afraid – won Dove Award for Group of the Year	Producer
1998	Jars of Clay, Much Afraid – won Grammy for Best Pop/Contemporary Gospel Album	Producer
2004	Will Young, Leave Right Now – nominated for Brits Best British Single	Producer
2002	S Club 7, Don't Stop Movin' – won Brit for Best British Single	Producer
2002	S Club 7, Don't Stop Movin' – won ITV Record of the Year	Producer
1996	Annie Lennox, No More I Love You's – won Grammy for Best Female Pop Performance	Producer
1996	Annie Lennox, Medusa – nominated for Best Pop Vocal Album	Producer
1993	Annie Lennox, Diva – nominated for Grammys Album of the Year	Producer
1993	Annie Lennox, Diva – nominated for Grammys Best Pop Vocal Performance	Producer
1993	Annie Lennox, Diva – won Grammy for Best Music Video – Long Form Music Video	Producer
1993	Annie Lennox, Diva – won Brit for Best British Album	Producer
1992	Stephen Lipson – won Music Week Producer of the Year	Producer
1990	Paul McCartney, Flowers in the Dirt – nominated for Grammys Best Engineered Album	Producer and Engineer
