= Let Me Down (disambiguation) =

"Let Me Down" is a 2018 song by Jorja Smith.

Let Me Down may also refer to:

- "Let Me Down", a 2002 song by No Use for a Name from Hard Rock Bottom
- "Let Me Down", a 2003 song by Limp Bizkit from Results May Vary
- "Let Me Down", a 2006 song by Polytechnic released as a double A-side with "Won't You Come Around?"
- "Let Me Down", a 2007 song by Moka Only from Vermilion
- "Let Me Down", a 2011 song by Kelly Clarkson from Stronger
- "Let Me Down", a 2022 song by BoyWithUke from Serotonin Dreams
- "Let Me Down", a 2023 song by the Lottery Winners from Anxiety Replacement Therapy

== See also ==
- Let Me Down Easy (disambiguation)
- Don't Let Me Down (disambiguation)
- "Lose Control (Let Me Down)", by Keri Hilson featuring Nelly
