= Don't Bring Me Down (disambiguation) =

"Don't Bring Me Down" is a 1979 song by the Electric Light Orchestra.

Don't Bring Me Down may also refer to:

- "Don't Bring Me Down" (The Animals song), 1966
- "Don't Bring Me Down" (Pretty Things song), 1964
- "Don't Bring Me Down" (Sia song), 2003
- "Don't Bring Me Down", a song by Brock Downey, 2004
- "Don't Bring Me Down", a song by Feeder, a B-side from "Day In Day Out", 1999
- "Don't Bring Me Down", a song by Riot from Fire Down Under, 1981
- "Hey! (Don't Bring Me Down)", a song by TVXQ from Mirotic, 2008

== See also ==
- Don't Let Me Down (disambiguation)
