= From Now On (Will Young album) =

Studio album by Will Young
- Released: 7 October 2002
- Length: 52:29
- Labels: 19; S; RCA; BMG
- Producers: Absolute; Cathy Dennis; Jörgen Elofsson; Julian Gallagher; David Kreuger; Stephen Lipson; Per Magnusson; Oskar Paul; Mike Peden; Richard Stannard; Fabien Waltmann

Will Young chronology
From Now On (2002)	Friday's Child (2003)

Singles from From Now On
- 1. "Anything Is Possible"/"Evergreen" Released: 25 February 2002; 2. "Light My Fire" Released: 27 May 2002; 3. "The Long and Winding Road" Released: 23 September 2002; 4. "You and I" Released: 18 November 2002

From Now On is the debut studio album by English recording artist Will Young. It was released by S Records on 7 October 2002, eight months after he won the first series of Pop Idol. The singer worked with a variety of writers and producers on the album, including Absolute, Cathy Dennis, Julian Gallagher, Stephen Lipson, Mike Peden, and Richard Stannard as well as Swedish musicians such as Jörgen Elofsson, David Kreuger, and Per Magnusson. Young co-wrote five songs on From Now On which also features a cover version of The Beatles' song "The Long and Winding Road", a duet with fellow Pop Idol finalist Gareth Gates.

The album debuted at number one on the UK Albums Chart, while peaking at number 11 eleven in Ireland and reaching the top thirty in Ireland and the Netherlands. It became the 18th biggest-selling of 2002 in the United Kingdom and has gone on to sell over 880,000 copies. From Now On spawned four singles, including double A-single "Anything Is Possible"/"Evergreen", United Kingdom's highest-selling single of the decade. Follow-up singles "Light My Fire" and "The Long and Winding Road" also fared well, both becoming chart toppers on the UK Singles Chart, while "You and I", released as a double A-side with the non-album track "Don't Let Me Down", peaked at number two. In 2003, the album won Young a BRIT Award for Best Breakthrough Artist, while "Evergreen" received a nomination in the Song of the Year category and "Anything Is Possible" was awarded the Ivor Novello Award for Bestselling Song of 2002.

== Promotion ==
From Now On was preceded by its double A-lead single, consisting of a cover version of Irish boy band Westlife's 2001 song "Evergreen" and "Anything Is Possible", a new song written for the winner of Pop Idol by Chris Braide and Cathy Dennis. In March 2002, this became the fastest-selling debut in UK chart history, selling 403,027 copies on its day of release (1,108,659 copies in its first week). It went on to sell over 1.7 million copies, and on the official list of the all-time best-selling singles in the UK issued later that year, it was ranked eleventh. In 2008, Official Charts Company released the Top 40 Biggest Selling Singles of the 21st century (so far) in which Young's version of "Evergreen" topped the chart. On 31 December 2009, BBC Radio 1 confirmed that "Anything Is Possible"/"Evergreen" was the biggest selling single of the 2000s decade in the United Kingdom. This was again confirmed on 7 May 2012 when Radio 1 played a countdown of the top-selling 150 songs of the millennium so far.

"Light My Fire", a cover version of American rock band The Doors 1967 hit single, recorded in the style of Puerto Rican singer José Feliciano's version (1968), was released as the album's second single, having previously been performed as a piano version in the final 50 of Pop Idol, and again, with a backing track, in the final 10. The song went straight to the number one spot in the UK Singles Chart, selling 177,000 copies in its first week of release, and stayed at number one for two weeks. Also serving as Young's international debut, it became a top ten hit in Ireland, and, Italy. A cover version of The Beatles's "The Long and Winding Road" (1970), a duet with fellow Pop Idol contestant Gareth Gates, was released as a double A-side (with Gates's song "Suspicious Minds" from his album What My Heart Wants to Say) and became Young's third consecutive number-one hit in the United Kingdom. The album's final single, another double A-side, consisting of "You and I" and the non-album track "Don't Let Me Down", was released in aid of Children in Need, and reached the top five in the Netherlands and the United Kingdom.

== Critical reception ==
Professional ratings
Review scores
Source	Rating
AllMusic	3/5 stars
The Guardian	1/5 stars
MTV Asia	5/10
Pop Rescue	4/5 stars
RTÉ	2/5 stars
Yahoo! Music UK	4/10

Julie Broadfoot from BBC Music wrote that Young "got on with making an impressive, timeless, debut album [...] A quality cast have been picked. However, this album is not paint-by-numbers pop; the legendary Burt Bacharach has got involved, acting as the perfect accompaniment to Will's vocal talent." Broadfoot singled "Lovestruck" out for praise, calling From Now On an "impressive, timeless, debut album" and "a fab album that won't disappoint anyone." Michael Osborn of musicOMH noted "This debut offering seems to have struck a balance between making the best of Will Young's particular talents – and the musical niche where he excels. It should go some way towards silencing critics [...]", although he felt Young appeared nit "entirely comfortable with [...] sweet, candied pop." Allmusic editor Jon O'Brien found that "Young proved himself to be one of the most gifted and unique vocalists a U.K. talent show has seen" but called From Now On "an inconsistent effort." He disliked the singles, but added that the album has "a well-produced and well-crafted collection of mature pop songs that suggests Young will have no problem breaking free from his Pop Idol tag in the future."

RTÉ critic David Byrne found that "what this album needs is less humming and strumming, and more of the intensity evident in "Fine Line" and "Side By Side". The music is well-produced, but it just doesn't seem to fit Will. It would be great to see him rock-out Avril Lavigne-style, up-tempo à la Kylie or even salsa like Ricky Martin, but that might be expecting a bit much. A little loosening-up perhaps? Will is far too young for sipping cocktails with Burt [Bacharach]." Alexis Petridis, writing for The Guardian, felt that "Young does not exist as an artist in his own right [...] You wouldn't wish him sleepless nights. He really does seem like a nice enough bloke. But after hearing From Now On, you wish this wretched business would stop, and stop soon." In a retrospective review, Pop Rescue gave the album four stars of five rating, commenting they were "somewhat surprised by how good this album is. As predicted, it throws in some pent-up S Club pop that must have been originally intended for judges' favourite Gareth Gates' anticipated win, but the sum of the greatness of the other songs out-weighs this". The writer praising Young's vocals throughout the album and numbers such as "Light My Fire", "Lovestruck", "Fine Line" and "What's in a Goodbye", among others.

== Commercial performance ==
From Now On debuted at number one on the UK Albums Chart in the week ending 19 October 2002, having sold 187,350 copies in its first week of sales. The Official Charts Company ranked it 18th on its 2002 year-end chart. The album was certified platinum by the British Phonographic Industry (BPI) on 18 October 2002, and reached double platinum status on 15 November 2002. By 2015, From Now On had sold just over 880,000 copies.

== Track listing ==
From Now On track listing
No.	Title	Writer(s)	Producer(s)	Length
1.	"Evergreen"	Jörgen Elofsson; Per Magnusson; David Kreuger	Magnusson; Kreuger; Elofsson^{[a]}	4:13
2.	"Anything Is Possible"	Cathy Dennis; Chris Braide	Dennis; Oskar Paul	3:41
3.	"Light My Fire"	Jim Morrison; Ray Manzarek; John Densmore; Robby Krieger	Absolute	3:28
4.	"Lover Won't You Stay"	Dennis; Guy Chambers	Mike Peden; Dennis	4:06
5.	"Lovestruck"	Dennis; Will Young	Dennis; Fabien Waltmann	4:42
6.	"The Long and Winding Road" (with Gareth Gates)	John Lennon; Paul McCartney	Stephen Lipson	3:30
7.	"You and I"	Peden; Ed Johnson; Henry Johnson	Peden	4:06
8.	"Side by Side"	Richard Stannard; Julian Gallagher; Dave Morgan; Young; Simon Hale	Stannard; Gallagher	4:17
9.	"What's in Goodbye"	Dennis; Burt Bacharach	Dennis; Waltmann	3:06
10.	"Cruel to be Kind"	Dennis; Young	Peden; Dennis	4:55
11.	"Over You"	Stannard; Gallagher; Morgan; Young; Hale	Stannard; Gallagher	4:22
12.	"From Now On"	Stannard; Gallagher; Morgan; Young	Stannard; Gallagher	3:42
13.	"Fine Line"	Peden; E. Johnson; H. Johnson	Peden	4:21
Total length:				52:29

Notes

- ^{^[a]} signifies a co-producer

== Personnel ==
- Will Young – vocals
- Per Magnusson – keyboards
- Pete Murray – keyboards
- Peter Gordeno – keyboards, piano, Fender Rhodes
- Simon Hale – keyboards
- Esbörn Öhrwall – guitar
- Fridrik 'Frizzy' Karlsson – guitar
- Milton McDonald – guitar
- Fabien Waltmann – guitar, bass guitar
- Graham Kearns – guitar
- Anthony Drennan – guitar
- Dave Morgan – guitar
- Steve Lewinson – bass guitar
- Paul Turner – bass guitar
- Jack Daley – bass guitar
- Tomas Lindburg – bass guitar
- Jeremy Stacey – drums
- Richard 'Biff' Stannard – drums, backing vocals
- Julian Gallagher – drums
- Karlos Edwards – percussion
- Thomas Dyani – percussion
- Karen Street – accordion
- The London Session Orchestra – strings
- Stockholm Session Orchestra - strings
- Absolute – instruments on "Light My Fire"
- Anders von Hofsten – backing vocals
- Jeanette Olsson – backing vocals
- United Colours of Sound – backing vocals
- Lance Ellington – backing vocals
- Silvia Mason-James – backing vocals
- Cathy Dennis – backing vocals
- Tee Green – backing vocals
- Ed Johnson – backing vocals
- Lucie Silvas – backing vocals
- Sharon Murphy – backing vocals
- London Community Gospel Choir – gospel choir
- Per Magnusson – producer, arrangement
- David Kreuger – producer, arrangement, programming
- Cathy Dennis – producer, programmer
- Oskar Paul – producer, programmer
- Absolute – producer
- Mike Peden – producer
- Fabian Waltmann – producer, arrangement, additional drum programming, engineer
- Stephen Lipson – producer
- Richard 'Biff' Stannard – producer
- Julian Gallagher – producer, programmer
- Jörgen Elofsson – co-producer
- Bernard Löhr – mixer
- Adrian Bushby – mixer
- Steve Fitzmaurice – mixer
- Brad Gilderman – mixer
- Phillipe Rose – assistant mixer
- Jimmy Robertson – assistant mixer
- Peter Lewis – engineer
- Adam Brown – engineer
- Matt Ross – engineer
- Jeremy Stacey – engineer
- Heff Moraes – engineer, mixer
- Geoff Foster – engineer
- Tim Roe – assistant engineer
- Fredrik Anderson – orchestra engineer
- Ulf and Henrik Janson – orchestra arrangement and conduction
- Nick Ingram – string arranger, conductor
- Gavyn Wright – orchestra leader
- Isobel Griffiths Ltd – orchestra contractor
- Martin Hayles – recording engineer
- Charlie Russell – programmer
- Alvin Sweeney – recorder, mixer, programmer
- Paul J. Brady – assistant recorder, assistant mixer

== Charts ==
=== Weekly charts ===
Weekly chart performance for From Now On
Chart (2002)	Peak position
Dutch Albums (Album Top 100)	23
German Albums (Offizielle Top 100)	62
Irish Albums (IRMA)	11
Italian Albums (FIMI)	22
UK Albums (Official Charts)	1

=== Year-end charts ===
Year-end chart performance for From Now On
Chart (2002)	Position
UK Albums (OCC)	18

== Certifications ==
Certifications for From Now On
Region	Certification	Certified units/sales
United Kingdom (BPI)	2× Platinum	880,000

== Release history ==
From Now On release history
Region	Date	Format(s)	Label	Ref(s)
United Kingdom	7 October 2002	CD; digital download	19; S; RCA; BMG	
