= Streets Become Hallways =

EP by The Hot Lies
- Released: 2004
- Recorded: June–July 2004
- Studio: Soundhouse Studios, Adelaide
- Genre: Pop punk, Alternative rock, Punk rock
- Length: 17:44
- Label: Resist Records
- Producer: Dan Jones

The Hot Lies chronology
Streets Become Hallways (2004)	Heart Attacks and Callous Acts (2005)

Streets Become Hallways is the debut EP of the Australian band The Hot Lies. It spent 30 weeks on the AIR Indie Charts and has since sold out all its copies.

== Track listing ==
No.	Title	Length
1.	"Against the Wall"	2:58
2.	"Suspended Smiles"	3:49
3.	"One For the Memories"	3:24
4.	"Bullets and Blacklines"	4:15
5.	"A Breath and It's Gone..."	3:16

== Personnel ==
- Peter Wood – vocals
- Benjamin Pix – guitar, backing vocals
- Josh Delsar – guitar
- Leaton Rose – bass, backing vocals
- Jared Brown – drums
- Marcus Hennig – guitar
- Dan Jones – producer, additional engineering
- Anj – engineer, mixing
- Darren Thompson – additional engineering
- Ian Miller – additional editing
- John Ruberto – mastering
