= Light My Fire =

1967 single by the Doors

- Italian single cover

Single by the Doors

from the album The Doors
- B-side: "The Crystal Ship"
- Released: April 24, 1967
- Recorded: September 19–20 & 23, 1966
- Genre: Psychedelic rock; acid rock; jazz fusion
- Length: 7:06 (album version); 2:52 (single version)
- Label: Elektra
- Songwriters: Jim Morrison; Robby Krieger; John Densmore; Ray Manzarek
- Producer: Paul A. Rothchild

The Doors singles chronology
"Break On Through (To the Other Side)" (1967)	"Light My Fire" (1967)	"People Are Strange" (1967)

Audio sample
- file; help

"Light My Fire" is a song by the American rock band the Doors. Although it was principally written by the band's guitarist, Robby Krieger, songwriting was credited to the entire band. Recognized as one of the earliest examples of psychedelic rock, it was recorded in 1966 and released in January 1967 on their eponymous debut album. Due to its erotic lyrics and innovative structure, the track is widely regarded as an anthem of the 1960s psychedelia and counterculture movements.

Issued as an edited single on April 24, 1967, the song spent three weeks at number one on the Billboard Hot 100 chart; it re-entered the Billboard Hot 100 in 1968 following the success of José Feliciano's cover version (which charted at number three), peaking at number 87. The song also spent one week on the Cash Box Top 100, nearly a year after its recording. At the 11th Annual Grammy Awards in 1969, the cover by Feliciano won the Grammy Award for Best Contemporary Male Pop Vocal Performance. Feliciano also won the Grammy Award for Best New Artist.

== Background ==
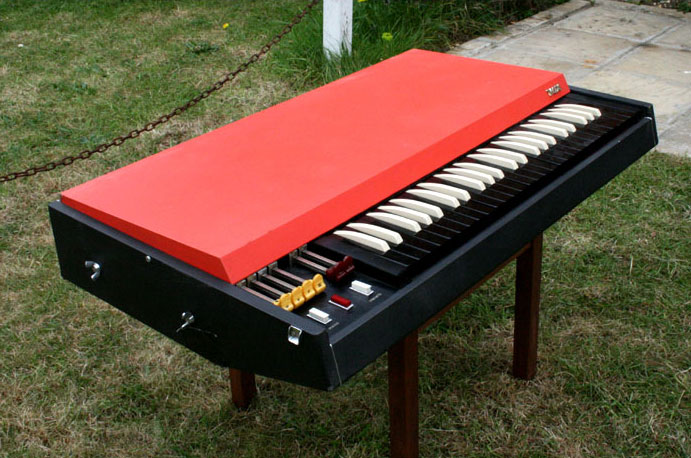
The Vox Continental organ was played by Ray Manzarek for the song's recording

Jim had been writing all the songs and then one day we realized we didn't have enough tunes, so he said, "Hey, why don't you guys try and write songs?" I wrote "Light My Fire" that night and brought it to the next rehearsal ... It's always kind of bugged me that so many people don't know I was the composer.

— Robby Krieger, discussing the song's writing process during an interview with Guitar World.

"Light My Fire" originated in early 1966 as a composition by Robby Krieger, who said that he was inspired by the melody of "Hey Joe" and the lyrics of the Rolling Stones' "Play with Fire". On taking his initial composition to the band, John Densmore suggested that it should have more of a Latin rhythm, Jim Morrison wrote the second verse and part of the chorus ("Try to set the night on fire"), while Ray Manzarek added the Bach-influenced introductory organ motif; Densmore also suggested that it should open with a single snare drum hit.

The band started playing the song in performances in April 1966, and extended it with a jazzy improvisation. When the Doors performed the song at live concerts, Manzarek played the song's bass line with his left hand on a Fender Rhodes Piano Bass, while performing the main keyboard lines on a Vox Continental using his right hand. When they came to record the song later in the year, producer Paul A. Rothchild brought in session musician Larry Knechtel to overdub a Fender Precision Bass guitar to double the keyboard bass line. Rothchild also suggested that the recording repeat the introductory motif at the end of the track.

The track was recorded in the course of three sessions, September 19, 20, and 23, 1966 at Sunset Sound Recorders. The final recording was spliced between two different recordings.

Although the album version was just over seven minutes long, it was widely requested for radio play, notably by Los Angeles DJ Dave Diamond, and Elektra Records owner Jac Holzman asked that a shorter version be released as a single. Rothchild edited a single version, cut down to under three minutes with nearly all the instrumental break removed for airplay on AM radio.

=== The Ed Sullivan Show ===
The band appeared on various TV shows, such as American Bandstand, miming to a playback of the single. "Light My Fire" was also performed live by the Doors on The Ed Sullivan Show broadcast on September 17, 1967. The Doors were asked by producer Bob Precht, Ed Sullivan's son-in-law, to change the line "girl, we couldn't get much higher", as the sponsors were uncomfortable with the possible reference to drugs. However, the meaning of the line was confirmed to be literal, as in "high in the sky". The band agreed to do so, and did a rehearsal using the amended lyrics, "girl, we couldn't get much better". However, during the live performance, lead singer Jim Morrison sang the original, unaltered lyrics. Sullivan did not shake Morrison's hand as he left the stage. The band had been negotiating a multi-episode deal with the producers; however, after violating the agreement not to perform the offending line, they were informed they would never perform on the show again. Morrison's response was "Hey man. We just did the Sullivan show." This performance was portrayed in Oliver Stone's 1991 biopic film, but with Morrison singing "higher" more emphatically and without his subsequent retort to Sullivan and the show's producer.

=== Buick TV commercial ===
Drummer John Densmore recalled that Buick offered $75,000 in October 1968 to adapt the song for use in a Buick TV commercial ("Come on, Buick, light my fire"). Morrison, however, was still in London after a European tour had just ended on September 20, and could not be contacted by the other band members, who agreed to the deal in his absence. As the band had agreed in 1965 to both equal splits and everyone having veto power in decisions, Morrison consequently called Buick and threatened to personally smash a Buick with a sledgehammer on television, should the commercial be aired.

== Musical structure ==
"Light My Fire" has been described as a psychedelic rock, acid rock, and jazz fusion song. It is notated in the key of A minor and is set in common time. Ray Manzarek's keyboard playing descends from G to D major, then goes to F and B♭ major; continuing onto the pitches of E♭ and A♭ major, before returning to the initial key of A major. This alternation was based on Johann Bach's "Two and Three Part Inventions", but author Philip Clark has suggested that it may have been inspired by Dave Brubeck's compositions. The extended solo arrangement is performed throughout the keys of A minor and B minor, the same chord progression used by John Coltrane on his cover version of "My Favorite Things". According to Manzarek, the instrumental sections were an homage to John Coltrane whom the band admired. Parts of the solos are polyrhythmic. Some observers noticed baroque pop influences in the song.

=== Speed discrepancy ===
The 40th Anniversary mix of the debut album presents a stereo version of "Light My Fire" in speed-corrected form for the first time. The speed discrepancy (being about 3.5% slow) was brought to Bruce Botnick's attention by Brigham Young University professor Michael Hicks, who noted that all video and audio live performances of the Doors performing the song, the sheet music, and statements of band members show the song in a key almost a half step higher (key of A) than the stereo LP release (key of A♭/G♯). Until the 2006 remasters, only the original 45 RPM singles ("Light My Fire" and "Break On Through") were produced at the correct speed.

== Release, legacy and critical reception ==
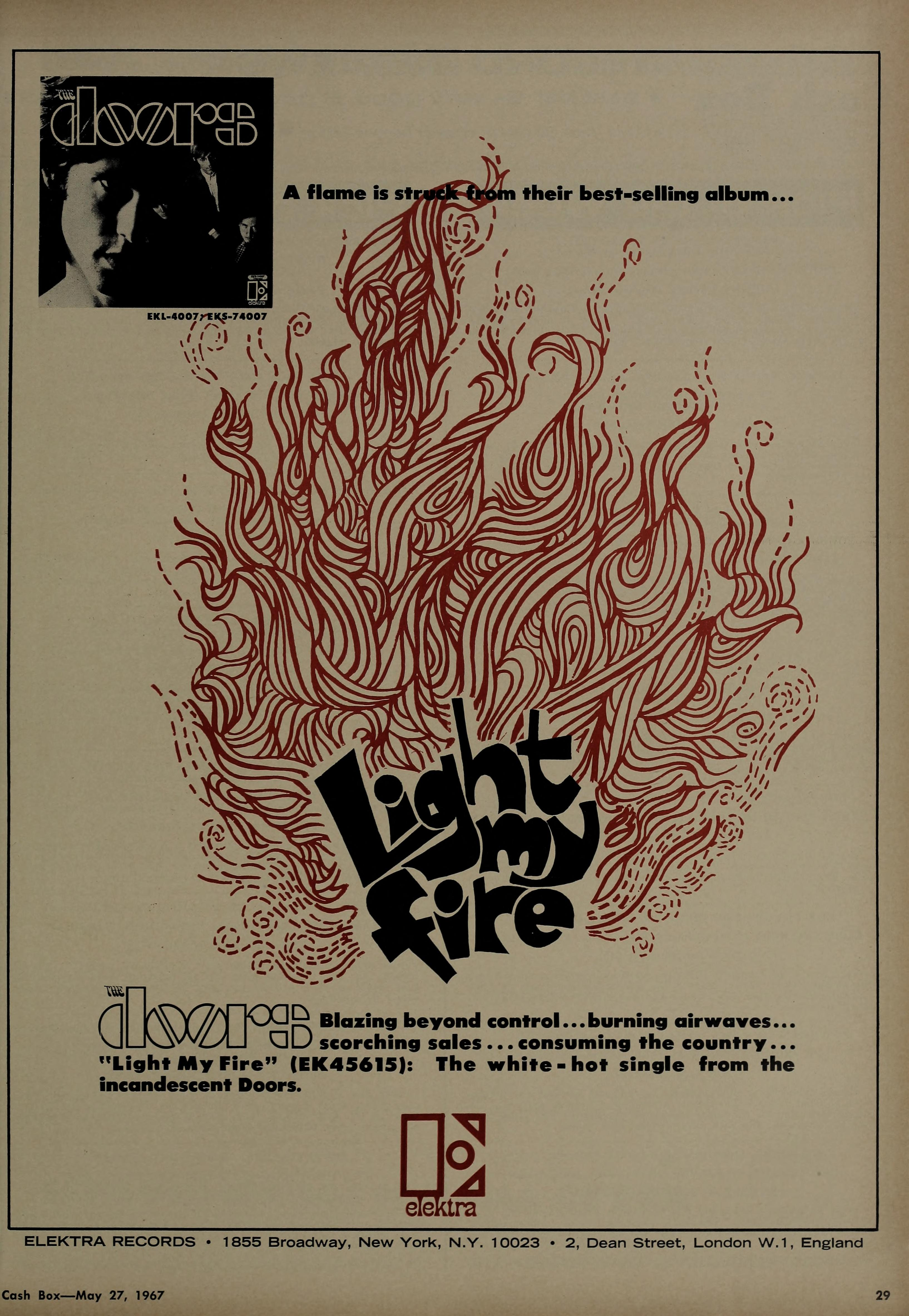
Cash Box advertisement, May 27, 1967

The Doors was released on January 4, 1967, through Elektra Records. "Light My Fire" is the sixth song on the standard track list. The song was released as a single on April 24, 1967. A live version was released in 1983 on their live album Alive, She Cried, the first of several live albums released in subsequent decades to include the song. "Light My Fire" achieved modest success in the United States, where it peaked at number 1 on both the Billboard Hot 100 chart, and the Cash Box Top 100 chart respectively. The single originally reached number 49 in the United Kingdom in 1967, but experienced belated success in that country in 1991, when a reissue peaked at number 7. This reissue was more successful in Ireland, peaking atop the IRMA chart for two weeks in June. The reissue occurred due to revived interest in the band following Oliver Stone's film biopic The Doors.

The single was certified gold by the Recording Industry Association of America in September 1967 for exceeding one million units shipped. As of December 1971, it was the band's best-selling single with over 927,000 copies sold. It was also certified Platinum by the RIAA in November 2018 for reaching 2,000,000 digital units. Subsequently it was certified 2x Platinum by the RIAA in November 2024 for reaching 4,000,000 digital units. Cash Box called the single a "potent, pounding foot-stomper with unlimited potential."

"Light My Fire" has been widely considered as the Doors' signature song, and a quintessential work of psychedelic rock. The song is widely regarded as an anthem of the 1960s psychedelia and counterculture movements, due to its erotic lyrics and innovative structure. In 2004 and 2010, the song was ranked at number 35 on Rolling Stone's 500 Greatest Songs of All Time, then it was re-ranked at number 310 on the 2021 list. It was included in RIAA's Songs of the Century list, at number 52. In 2014 NME ranked the song 199th in its 500 Greatest Songs of All Time list. Feliciano's cover won the 1969 Grammy Award for Best Male Pop Vocal Performance, the same year he also won the Grammy for Best New Artist. In 1998, the track was inducted into the Grammy Hall of Fame under the category Rock (single). Artists such as Brian Wilson, Jean-Jacques Burnel, and Feliciano himself, among others, are admirers of the song.

== Personnel ==
Credits are adapted from the liner notes of The Doors.

The Doors

- John Densmore – drums
- Robby Krieger – guitars
- Ray Manzarek – Vox Continental organ, Rhodes piano bass
- Jim Morrison – vocals

Additional musician

- Larry Knechtel – bass guitar

== Charts ==
=== Weekly charts ===
Chart (1967)	Peak position
Australia (Go-Set National Top 40)	16
Canada Top Singles (RPM)	2
Netherlands (Single Top 100)	27
New Zealand (Listener)	7
South Africa (Springbok)	13
UK Singles (Official Charts)	49
US Billboard Hot 100	1
US Cash Box Top 100	1

Chart (1991)	Peak position
Finland (Suomen virallinen lista)	12
Ireland (IRMA)	1
Luxembourg (Radio Luxembourg)	12
UK Singles (OCC)	7
UK Airplay (Music Week)	14

=== Year-end charts ===
Chart (1967)	Rank
Canada Top Singles (RPM)	4
US Billboard Hot 100	6
US Cash Box Top 100	2

== Certifications ==
Region	Certification	Certified units/sales
Italy (FIMI)	Gold	25,000^{‡}
New Zealand (RMNZ)	Platinum	30,000^{‡}
United Kingdom (BPI)	Silver	200,000^{‡}
United States (RIAA)	2× Platinum	4,000,000^{^}
^{‡} Sales+streaming figures based on certification alone.

== José Feliciano version ==
"Light My Fire"
- Side A of the reissue

Single by José Feliciano

from the album Feliciano!
- B-side: "California Dreamin'"
- Released: July 1968
- Recorded: January 6, 1968
- Studio: RCA's Music Center of the World, Hollywood, California
- Genre: Folk rock, latin jazz, latin pop
- Length: 3:33
- Label: RCA Victor
- Songwriter: The Doors
- Producer: Rick Jarrard

José Feliciano singles chronology
"La Copa Rota" (1968)	"Light My Fire" (1968)	"Hi-Heel Sneakers" / "Hitchcock Railway" (1968)

Official audio
- "Light My Fire" (Digitally Mastered - April 1992) on YouTube

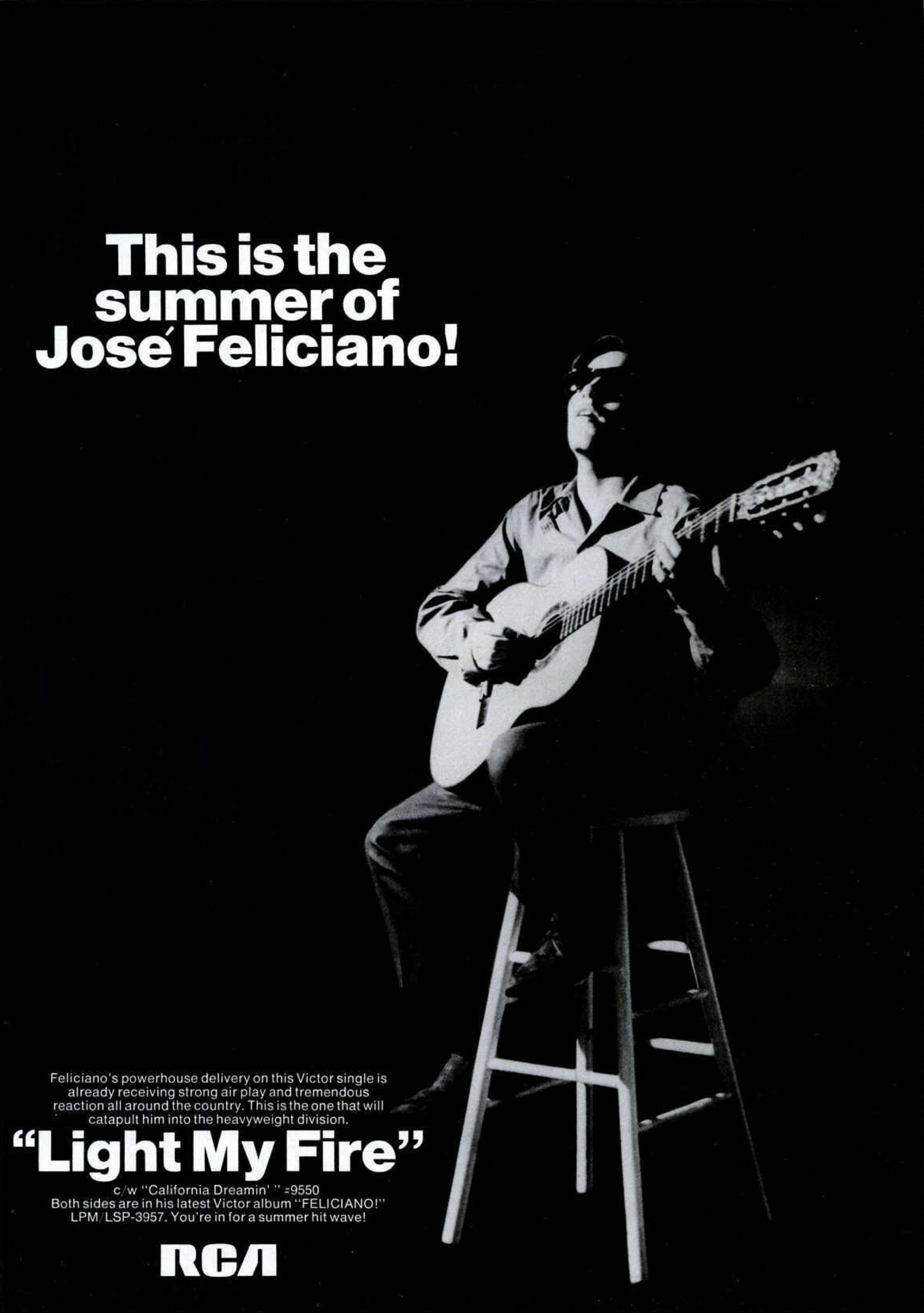
Billboard advertisement for Feliciano's version, July 13, 1968

The Puerto Rican vocalist and guitarist José Feliciano enjoyed significant international success when he released his version of "Light My Fire" in 1968 as a single on the RCA Victor label. Only a year after the original had been a number-one hit, his cover spent twelve weeks on the US Billboard Hot 100, debuting at number 62 the week of July 27, 1968, and peaking at number 3 the weeks of August 31, September 7 and 14, 1968. His version became the bigger hit in Australia and also in Canada, where it reached number one.

Feliciano's remake blended Latin influences, including a mixture of classic Spanish guitar, and soul, with American pop. It contains "proto-Latin rock" stylings, and a slower tempo than the Doors original version. In a 1969 interview, Feliciano said that he liked the song when he first heard it, but felt that he should wait a year before releasing the song. He also said that "California Dreamin'" was the original A-side of the single.

The single helped to spur the worldwide success of its album, Feliciano!, which was nominated for multiple Grammy Awards in 1969. Feliciano's arrangement of "Light My Fire" has influenced several subsequent versions, including that by Will Young. Songwriter Robby Krieger said in an interview about the cover: "It's really a great feeling to have written a classic. I think I owe a big debt to Jose Feliciano because he is actually the one, when he did it, everybody started doing it. He did a whole different arrangement on it."

Feliciano revisited the song, performing a duet with Minnie Riperton on her 1979 album Minnie.

=== Charts ===
==== Weekly charts ====
Chart (1968)	Peak position
Australia (Go-Set)	15
Brazil	2
Canada RPM Top Singles	1
Ireland (IRMA)	14
Netherlands (Dutch Top 40)	24
Mexico	3
New Zealand (Listener)	16
Norway	7
UK Singles (Official Charts)	6
US Billboard Hot 100	3
US Hot Rhythm & Blues Singles (Billboard)	29
US Cash Box Top 100	3

==== Year-end charts ====
Chart (1968)	Rank
Canada	27
US Billboard Hot 100	52
US Cash Box	37

== Amii Stewart version ==
"Light My Fire"

Single by Amii Stewart

from the album Knock on Wood
- B-side: "Bring It on Back to Me"
- Released: 1979
- Genre: Disco
- Length: 8:22
- Label: Atlantic; Ariola America; Hansa
- Songwriters: Barry Leng; Simon May; The Doors
- Producer: Barry Leng

Amii Stewart singles chronology
"Knock on Wood" (1979)	"Light My Fire" (1979)	"Jealousy" (1979)

In 1979, Amii Stewart released a disco version of "Light My Fire", together with a medley titled "137 Disco Heaven". It was a big hit in the UK, where it reached No. 5, and a mild hit in West Germany, peaking at No. 26. In the US, the song peaked at No. 69 on the Billboard Hot 100 and No. 36 on the Billboard Hot Soul Singles chart.

It reached the top 10 in the UK a second time in 1985, in remixed form together with "Knock on Wood/Ash 48". This release peaked at No. 7.

=== Charts ===
==== Weekly charts ====
Chart (1979)	Peak position
Australia (Kent Music Report)	14
Belgium (Ultratop 50 Flanders)	30
Canada Top Singles (RPM)	58
Finland (Suomen virallinen lista)	27
Ireland (IRMA)	20
New Zealand (Recorded Music NZ)	30
Sweden (Sverigetopplistan)	12
UK Singles (OCC)	5
US Billboard Hot 100	69
US Hot Soul (Billboard)	36
West Germany (Official German Charts)	26

==== Year-end charts ====
Chart (1979)	Position
Australia (Kent Music Report)	91

== Will Young version ==
"Light My Fire"

Single by Will Young

from the album From Now On
- B-side: "Ain't No Sunshine"; "Beyond the Sea"
- Released: May 27, 2002
- Recorded: 2002
- Label: 19; S; RCA; BMG
- Songwriters: Jim Morrison; Ray Manzarek; John Densmore; Robby Krieger
- Producer: Absolute

Will Young singles chronology
"Anything Is Possible" / "Evergreen" (2002)	"Light My Fire" (2002)	"The Long and Winding Road" (2002)

British singer and Pop Idol series 1 winner Will Young covered "Light My Fire" in 2002. He originally performed a piano version of the song in the final 50 of Pop Idol, and again, with a backing track, in the final 10. A studio version, recorded in the style of Puerto Rican musician José Feliciano's version, was later released as his second single. The song went straight to the number one spot in the UK Singles Chart, selling 177,000 copies in its first week of release, while staying at number one for two weeks. Young also performed the song on World Idol, where he came in fifth place.

=== Credits and personnel ===
Credits are lifted from the From Now On album booklet.

Studios

- Produced at Olympic Studios (London, England)
- Mastered at Metropolis (London, England)

Personnel

- Jim Morrison – writing
- Ray Manzarek – writing
- John Densmore – writing
- Robby Krieger – writing
- Milton McDonald – guitars
- Karlos Edwards – percussion
- Nick Ingman – string arrangement, conducting
- Gavyn Wright – orchestra leader
- Isobel Griffiths Ltd. – orchestra contracting
- Absolute – all other instruments, production
- Steve Fitzmaurice – mixing
- Philippe Rose – mixing assistance
- Tony Cousins – mastering

=== Charts ===
==== Weekly charts ====
Weekly chart performance for "Light My Fire"
Chart (2002–2003)	Peak position
Belgium (Ultratip Bubbling Under Flanders)	10
Belgium (Ultratip Bubbling Under Wallonia)	13
Europe (Eurochart Hot 100)	8
Germany (GfK)	44
Ireland (IRMA)	5
Italy (FIMI)	4
Netherlands (Dutch Top 40)	35
Netherlands (Single Top 100)	21
Scottish Singles Sales (Official Charts)	1
Switzerland (Schweizer Hitparade)	76
UK Singles (Official Charts)	1

==== Year-end charts ====
2002 year-end chart performance for "Light My Fire"
Chart (2002)	Position
Ireland (IRMA)	71
UK Singles (OCC)	16

2003 year-end chart performance for "Light My Fire"
Chart (2003)	Position
Italy (FIMI)	11

=== Certifications ===
Certifications for "Light My Fire"
Region	Certification	Certified units/sales
Italy (FIMI)	Gold	25,000^{*}
United Kingdom (BPI)	Gold	400,000^{^}
^{*} Sales figures based on certification alone.^{^} Shipments figures based on certification alone.

=== Release history ===
Release dates and formats for "Light My Fire"
Region	Date	Label	Format(s)	Ref(s)
United Kingdom	May 27, 2002	19; S; RCA; BMG	CD single	
