= List of best-selling singles of the 21st century in the United Kingdom =

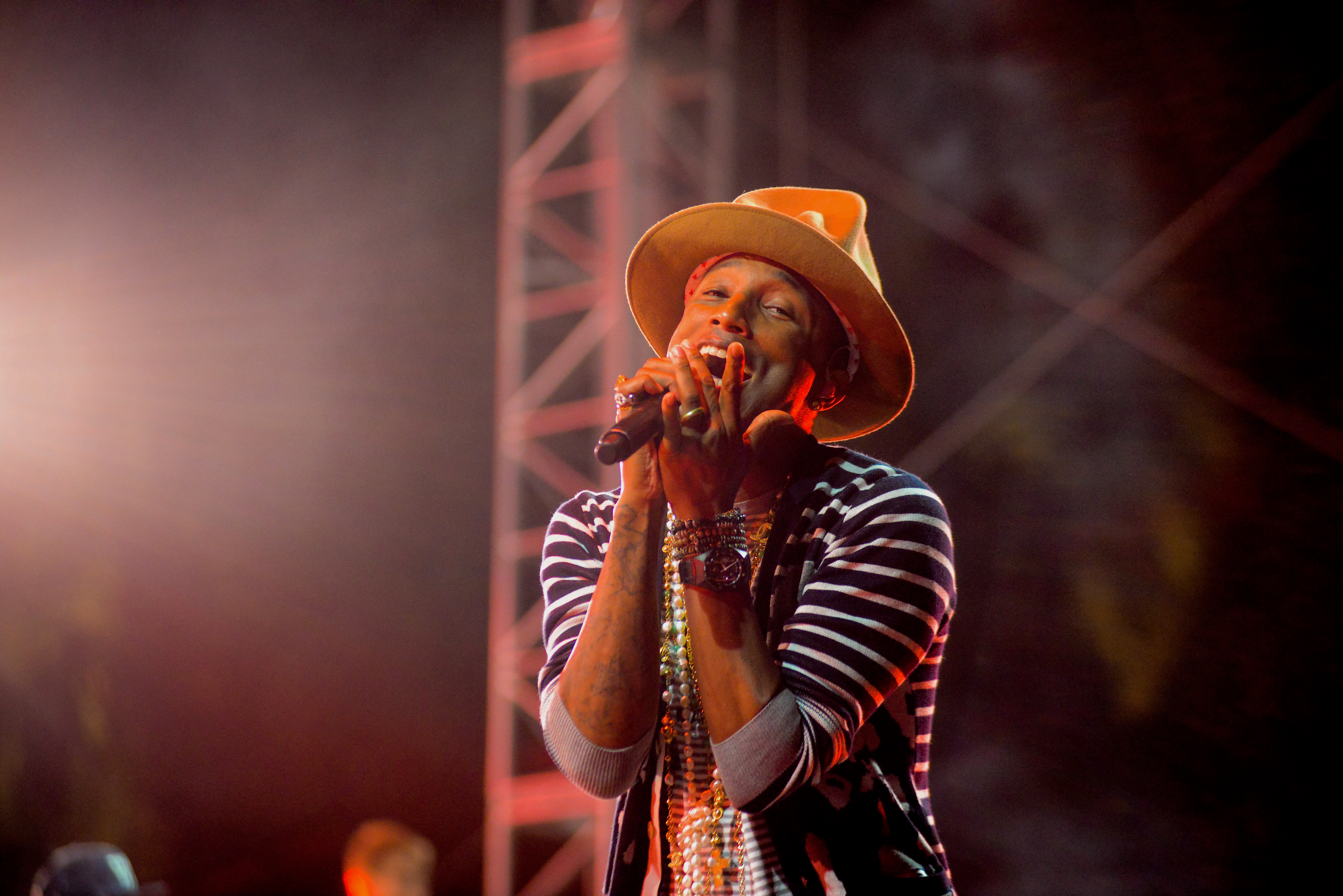
Having sold over 1.9 million copies, "Happy" by Pharrell Williams is the best-selling single in the UK since 2001 based on paid-for sales

The UK Singles Chart is a music chart compiled by the Official Charts Company (OCC) that calculates the best-selling singles of the week in the United Kingdom. Since 2005, the chart has been based on the sales of both physical and digital singles, initially on the condition that the single was available in both formats. In 2007, the rules were changed so that legal downloads of all songs, irrespective of whether a physical copy was available, were eligible to chart and since July 2014, streaming has been included.

== Best-selling singles based on paid-for sales ==
This is a list of the sales of records released from 1 January 2001 onwards; sales for this period of records released before 2001 are not included. With sales of over 1,920,000, "Happy" by Pharrell Williams is the best-selling single in the UK since January 2001. Will Young's double A-side single "Anything Is Possible" / "Evergreen", which has sold over 1,790,000 million copies, is the second-biggest seller, followed by "Blurred Lines" by Robin Thicke featuring T.I. and Williams in third. The top five is completed by "Uptown Funk" at four and "Someone Like You" by Adele in fifth. As of September 2017, 62 singles released in the 2000s have sold over 1 million copies.

Until June 2014, only a paid download or a purchase of a physical single counted as a sale. Based on this definition, these are the best-selling singles in the UK since 2001. Sales positions are current as of 17 September 2017.

| No. | Single | Artist | Released (Note: Dates and chart peaks are those given by the OCC.) | Traditional sales (Note: The sales are those given by the OCC as of 17 September 2017.) | Chart peak |
|---|---|---|---|---|---|
| 1 | "Happy" | Pharrell Williams | November 2013 | 1,921,805 | 1 |
| 2 | "Anything Is Possible" / "Evergreen" | Will Young | February 2002 | 1,795,213 | 1 |
| 3 | "Blurred Lines" | Robin Thicke featuring T.I. and Pharrell Williams | May 2013 | 1,667,615 | 1 |
| 4 | "Uptown Funk" | Mark Ronson featuring Bruno Mars | December 2014 | 1,647,310 | 1 |
| 5 | "Someone like You" | Adele | January 2011 | 1,644,597 | 1 |
| 6 | "Moves Like Jagger" | Maroon 5 featuring Christina Aguilera | August 2011 | 1,536,041 | 2 |
| 7 | "Somebody That I Used to Know" | Gotye featuring Kimbra | January 2012 | 1,515,527 | 1 |
| 8 | "Wake Me Up" | Avicii | June 2013 | 1,483,346 | 1 |
| 9 | "I Gotta Feeling" | The Black Eyed Peas | September 2009 | 1,477,778 | 1 |
| 10 | "Get Lucky" | Daft Punk featuring Pharrell Williams | April 2013 | 1,471,356 | 1 |
| 11 | "It Wasn't Me" | Shaggy | February 2001 | 1,428,204 | 1 |
| 12 | "We Found Love" | Rihanna featuring Calvin Harris | 2011 | 1,415,416 | 1 |
| 13 | "Sex on Fire" | Kings of Leon | 2008 | 1,386,171 | 1 |
| 14 | "Call Me Maybe" | Carly Rae Jepsen | 2012 | 1,358,631 | 1 |
| 15 | "(Is This the Way to) Amarillo" | Tony Christie featuring Peter Kay | 2005 | 1,354,478 | 1 |
| 16 | "Unchained Melody" | Gareth Gates | 2002 | 1,345,850 | 1 |
| 17 | "Just the Way You Are (Amazing)" | Bruno Mars | 2010 | 1,331,684 | 1 |
| 18 | "Impossible" | James Arthur | 2012 | 1,310,169 | 1 |
| 19 | "Hallelujah" | Alexandra Burke | 2008 | 1,310,017 | 1 |
| 20 | "Gangnam Style" | Psy | 2012 | 1,304,437 | 1 |
| 21 | "Titanium" | David Guetta featuring Sia | 2012 | 1,300,566 | 1 |
| 22 | "Party Rock Anthem" | LMFAO featuring Lauren Bennett and GoonRock | 2011 | 1,284,335 | 1 |
| 23 | "Rather Be" | Clean Bandit featuring Jess Glynne | 2014 | 1,283,122 | 1 |
| 24 | "All of Me" | John Legend | 2013 | 1,259,708 | 2 |
| 25 | "Love the Way You Lie" | Eminem featuring Rihanna | 2010 | 1,258,763 | 2 |
| 26 | "Let Her Go" | Passenger | 2013 | 1,243,336 | 2 |
| 27 | "Price Tag" | Jessie J featuring B.o.B | 2011 | 1,228,371 | 1 |
| 28 | "Thinking Out Loud" | Ed Sheeran | 2013 | 1,219,184 | 1 |
| 29 | "Can't Get You Out of My Head" | Kylie Minogue | 2001 | 1,195,229 | 1 |
| 30 | "Do They Know It's Christmas?" | Band Aid 20 | 2004 | 1,184,396 | 1 |
| 31 | "Poker Face" | Lady Gaga | 2009 | 1,180,377 | 1 |
| 32 | "Only Girl (In the World)" | Rihanna | 2010 | 1,162,460 | 1 |
| 33 | "Starships" | Nicki Minaj | 2012 | 1,162,065 | 1 |
| 34 | "Chasing Cars" | Snow Patrol | 2006 | 1,159,099 | 6 |
| 35 | "We Are Young" | fun. featuring Janelle Monáe | 2012 | 1,145,195 | 1 |
| 36 | "Counting Stars" | OneRepublic | 2013 | 1,132,526 | 1 |
| 37 | "Crazy" | Gnarls Barkley | 2006 | 1,131,184 | 1 |
| 38 | "The A Team" | Ed Sheeran | 2011 | 1,118,825 | 3 |
| 39 | "Use Somebody" | Kings of Leon | 2008 | 1,115,392 | 2 |
| 40 | "Bleeding Love" | Leona Lewis | 2007 | 1,114,596 | 1 |

== Best-selling songs based on combined sales ==
From 2014 streaming has counted towards sales (sometimes called "combined sales" or "chart sales") at the rate of 100 streams equal to one download or physical purchase, although the singles chart no longer uses this ratio. In September 2017, the OCC changed their definition of a 'million seller' to include streaming. These are the biggest selling songs based on combined physical, download and streaming sales. As of September 2017 there were nine over 2 million and 185 over a million combined sales from the 2000s Century. In October 2017, "Shape of You" by Ed Sheeran became the first song from the 2000s Century to achieve 3 million combined sales.

| Position | Song | Artist | Peak | Year | Sales | Streaming equivalent | Combined sales |
|---|---|---|---|---|---|---|---|
| 1 | "Shape of You" | Ed Sheeran | 1 | 2017 | 754,754+ | 2,121,706+ | 3,006,404 |
| 2 | "Uptown Funk" | Mark Ronson featuring Bruno Mars | 1 | 2014 | 1,647,310 | 1,076,160 | 2,723,470 |
| 3 | "Happy" | Pharrell Williams | 1 | 2013 | 1,921,805 | 707,851 | 2,629,657 |
| 4 | "Thinking Out Loud" | Ed Sheeran | 1 | 2014 | 1,219,184 | 1,302,119 | 2,521,302 |
| 5 | "One Dance" | Drake featuring Wizkid & Kyla | 1 | 2016 | 553,973 | 1,791,007 | 2,344,981 |
| 6 | "Rather Be" | Clean Bandit featuring Jess Glynne | 1 | 2014 | 1,283,122 | 935,575 | 2,218,697 |
| 7 | "Sorry" | Justin Bieber | 1 | 2015 | 724,188 | 1,443,719 | 2,167,907 |
| 8 | "All of Me" | John Legend | 2 | 2014 | 1,259,708 | 896,418 | 2,156,126 |
| 9 | "Love Yourself" | Justin Bieber | 1 | 2015 | 718,549 | 1,340,666 | 2,059,215 |
| 10 | "Someone Like You" | Adele | 1 | 2011 | 1,644,597 | 351,772 | 1,996,369 |
| 11 | "Wake Me Up!" | Avicii | 1 | 2013 | 1,483,346 | 484,035 | 1,967,381 |
| 12 | "Take Me to Church" | Hozier | 2 | 2013 | 934,466 | 1,017,851 | 1,952,317 |
| 13 | "Blurred Lines" | Robin Thicke featuring T.I. and Pharrell | 1 | 2013 | 1,667,615 | 284,004 | 1,951,619 |
| 14 | "Cheerleader (Felix Jaehn Remix)" | Omi | 1 | 2014 | 861,086 | 1,057,439 | 1,918,526 |
| 15 | "Despacito (Remix)" | Luis Fonsi featuring Daddy Yankee and Justin Bieber | 1 | 2017 | 566,425 | 1,334,174 | 1,900,599 |
| 16 | "Hello" | Adele | 1 | 2015 | 948,618 | 906,431 | 1,855,050 |
| 17 | "What Do You Mean?" | Justin Bieber | 1 | 2015 | 533,581 | 1,320,256 | 1,853,837 |
| 18 | "Let Her Go" | Passenger | 2 | 2012 | 1,243,336 | 589,019 | 1,832,354 |
| 19 | "Get Lucky" | Daft Punk featuring Pharrell Williams | 1 | 2013 | 1,471,356 | 349,989 | 1,821,344 |
| 20 | "Anything Is Possible" / "Evergreen" | Will Young | 1 | 2002 | 1,795,213 | 1,874 | 1,797,087 |
| 21 | "Cheap Thrills" | Sia | 2 | 2015 | 517,082 | 1,247,640 | 1,764,721 |
| 22 | "Moves Like Jagger" | Maroon 5 featuring Christina Aguilera | 2 | 2011 | 1,536,041 | 207,813 | 1,743,854 |
| 23 | "Somebody That I Used to Know" | Gotye featuring Kimbra | 1 | 2011 | 1,515,527 | 212,192 | 1,727,719 |
| 24 | "Mr. Brightside" | The Killers | 10 | 2004 | 967,180 | 750,991 | 1,718,170 |
| 25 | "Pompeii" | Bastille | 2 | 2013 | 959,693 | 749,011 | 1,708,704 |
| 26 | "7 Years" | Lukas Graham | 1 | 2015 | 653,657 | 1,054,211 | 1,707,868 |
| 27 | "We Found Love" | Rihanna | 1 | 2011 | 1,415,416 | 288,533 | 1,703,948 |
| 28 | "Sex on Fire" | Kings of Leon | 1 | 2008 | 1,386,171 | 315,931 | 1,702,103 |
| 29 | "Waves"(Robin Schulz remix) | Mr Probz | 1 | 2013 | 933,555 | 757,402 | 1,690,957 |
| 30 | "Castle on the Hill" | Ed Sheeran | 2 | 2017 | 478,716 | 1,192,607 | 1,671,322 |

== See also ==
- List of best-selling singles of the 2000s (decade) in the United Kingdom
- List of best-selling singles of the 2010s in the United Kingdom
