= Don't Let Me Down =

Don't Let Me Down may refer to:

- "Don't Let Me Down" (Beatles song), 1969
- "Don't Let Me Down" (The Chainsmokers song), 2016
- "Don't Let Me Down" (Disney song), from the Disney film Bedknobs and Broomsticks
- "Don't Let Me Down" (Eskimo Joe song), 2009
- "Don't Let Me Down" (The Farm song), 1991
- "Don't Let Me Down" (Leona Lewis song), 2009
- "Don't Let Me Down" (Lotta Engberg and Christer Sjögren song), 2012
- "Don't Let Me Down" (Will Young song), 2002
- "Don't Let Me Down", a song by Bad Company from Bad Company
- "Don't Let Me Down", a song by Band-Maid from New Beginning
- "Don't Let Me Down", a song by Big K.R.I.T. from Live from the Underground
- "Don't Let Me Down", a song by Eddie Thoneick featuring Michael Feiner from the compilation album Ministry of Sound Sessions Six
- "Don't Let Me Down", a song by Gotthard from Need to Believe
- "Don't Let Me Down", a song by Hanson from Red Green Blue
- "Don't Let Me Down", a song by The Hollies from Hollies
- "Don't Let Me Down", a song by Idina Menzel from I Stand
- "Don't Let Me Down", a song by Julian Lennon from Photograph Smile
- "Don't Let Me Down", a song by Juliana Hatfield from In Exile Deo
- "Don't Let Me Down", a song by Mabel from Destination
- "Don't Let Me Down", a song by Meghan Trainor from Meghan Trainor
- "Don't Let Me Down", a song by Michael McDonald from No Lookin' Back
- "Don't Let Me Down", a song by No Doubt from Rock Steady
- "Don't Let Me Down", a song by Twisted Sister from Stay Hungry
- "Don't Let Me Down", a song by ZZ Ward from Dirty Shine
- "Don't Let Me Dow", a song by Umbra Moon

== See also ==
- "Don't Let Me Down & Down", a song by Tahra and Martine Valmont from Black Tie White Noise
- "Don't Let Me Down, Gently", a song by The Wonder Stuff from Hup
- "Don't Let Me Down (Slowly)", a song by The Main Drag from You Are Underwater
- "DLMD", a song by 311 from 311
- "DLMD", a song by Darren Styles and TNT
- Don't Bring Me Down (disambiguation)
