= List of best-selling singles of the 2010s in the United Kingdom =

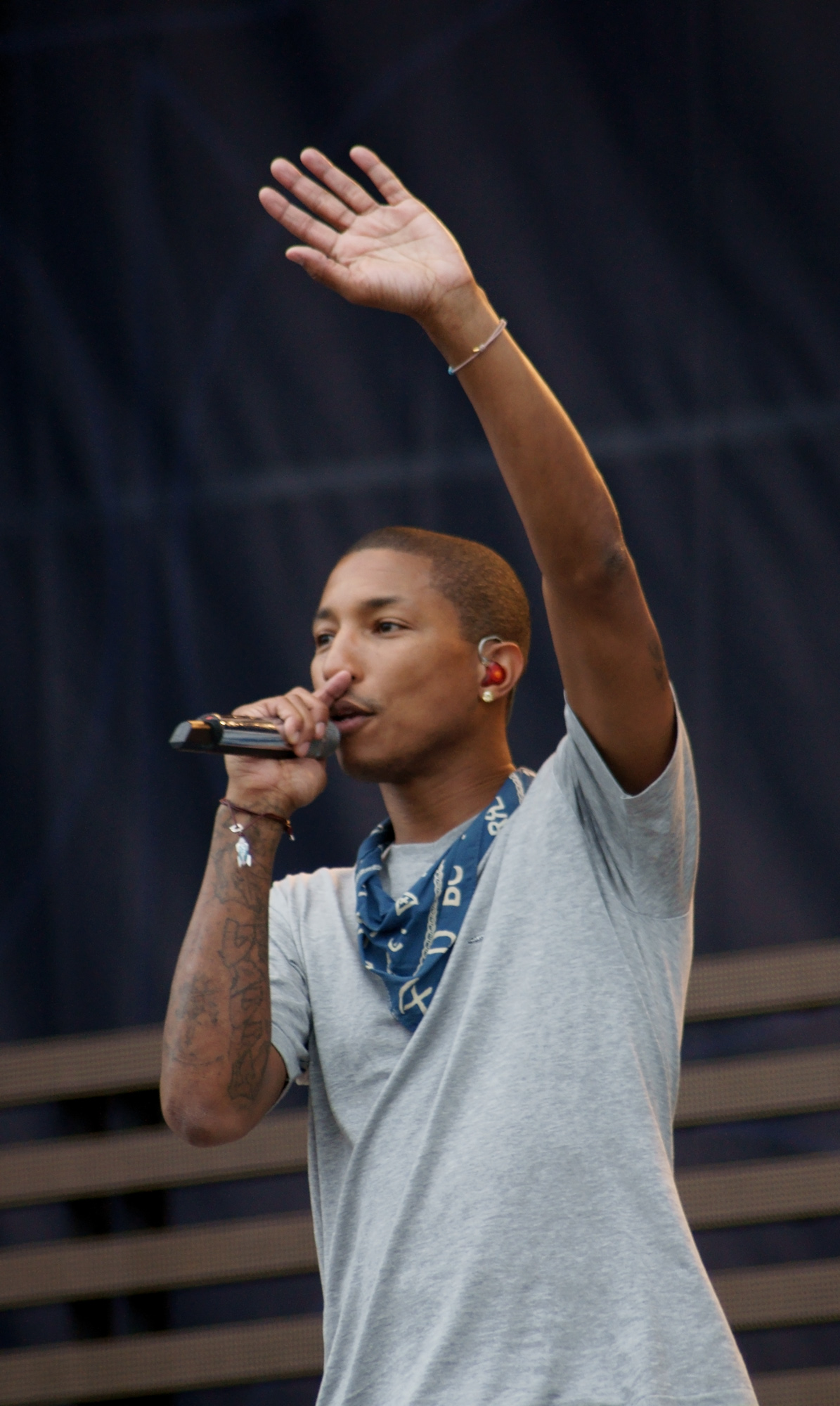
"Happy" by Pharrell Williams (pictured) is the UK's most downloaded song of all time and best-selling single since 2010 with sales of over 1,920,000.

For the purposes of calculating sales, a single is currently defined by the Official Charts Company (OCC) as either a 'single bundle' having no more than four tracks and not lasting longer than 25 minutes or one digital audio track not longer than 15 minutes with a minimum sale price of 40 pence. The rules have changed many times as technology has developed, the most notable being the inclusion of digital downloads in 2004 and of digital audio streaming in 2014. During the 2010s, sales of singles have been monitored by the OCC and compiled weekly as the UK Singles Chart.

Since July 2014, the UK Singles Chart has been based on streaming figures as well as physical/digital purchases, however the OCC still compiles a 'sales' (only) chart.

== Best-selling singles based on paid-for sales ==
The biggest selling single in the 2010s in the UK based on paid-for sales is "Happy" by Pharrell Williams, which has sold over 1,920,000 copies. During the decade, 37 singles released in the 2010s sold over 1 million copies—the highest number to achieve this within the decade of their release. Due to the growth of streaming and the consequent fall in paid for sales during the 2010s, all of the highest selling singles are from the first half of the decade, with Uptown Funk being the most recently released single to achieve sales of one million copies.

Sales figures are derived from the OCC list published on 19 September 2017.

Best-selling singles of the 2010s in the UK
No.	Single	Artist	Year	Copies sold	Chart peak
1	"Happy"	Pharrell Williams	2013	1,921,805	1
2	"Blurred Lines"	Robin Thicke featuring T.I. and Pharrell Williams	2013	1,667,615	1
3	"Uptown Funk"	Mark Ronson featuring Bruno Mars	2014	1,647,310	1
4	"Someone like You"	Adele	2011	1,644,597	1
5	"Moves Like Jagger"	Maroon 5 featuring Christina Aguilera	2011	1,536,041	2
6	"Somebody That I Used to Know"	Gotye featuring Kimbra	2012	1,515,527	1
7	"Wake Me Up!"	Avicii featuring Aloe Blacc	2013	1,483,346	1
8	"Get Lucky"	Daft Punk featuring Pharrell Williams	2013	1,471,356	1
9	"We Found Love"	Rihanna featuring Calvin Harris	2011	1,415,416	1
10	"Call Me Maybe"	Carly Rae Jepsen	2012	1,358,631	1
11	"Just the Way You Are (Amazing)"	Bruno Mars	2010	1,331,684	1
12	"Impossible"	James Arthur	2012	1,310,169	1
13	"Gangnam Style"	Psy	2012	1,304,437	1
14	"Titanium"	David Guetta featuring Sia	2012	1,300,566	1
15	"Party Rock Anthem"	LMFAO featuring Lauren Bennett and GoonRock	2011	1,284,335	1
16	"Rather Be"	Clean Bandit featuring Jess Glynne	2014	1,283,122	1
17	"All of Me"	John Legend	2013	1,259,708	2
18	"Love the Way You Lie"	Eminem featuring Rihanna	2010	1,258,763	2
19	"Let Her Go"	Passenger	2013	1,243,336	2
20	"Price Tag"	Jessie J featuring B.o.B	2011	1,228,371	1
21	"Thinking Out Loud"	Ed Sheeran	2014	1,219,184	1
22	"Only Girl (In the World)"	Rihanna	2010	1,162,460	1
23	"Starships"	Nicki Minaj	2012	1,162,065	2
24	"We Are Young"	fun. featuring Janelle Monáe	2012	1,145,195	1
25	"Counting Stars"	OneRepublic	2013	1,132,526	1
26	"The A Team"	Ed Sheeran	2011	1,118,825	3
27	"Roar"	Katy Perry	2013	1,112,787	1
28	"Diamonds"	Rihanna	2012	1,098,959	1
29	"Firework"	Katy Perry	2010	1,091,743	3
30	"Rolling in the Deep"	Adele	2010	1,086,347	2
31	"La La La"	Naughty Boy featuring Sam Smith	2013	1,070,199	1
32	"Give Me Everything"	Pitbull featuring Ne-Yo, Afrojack and Nayer	2011	1,050,457	1
33	"Don't You Worry Child"	Swedish House Mafia featuring John Martin	2012	1,018,874	1
34	"When We Collide"	Matt Cardle	2010	1,017,149	1
35	"Jar of Hearts"	Christina Perri	2011	1,018,874	4
36	"What Makes You Beautiful"	One Direction	2011	1,010,042	1
37	"Forget You"	CeeLo Green	2010	1,002,504	1
38	"Sexy and I Know It"	LMFAO	2011	999,080	5
39	"Grenade"	Bruno Mars	2010	997,862	1
40	"Paradise"	Coldplay	2011	995,808	1

== Best-selling songs of the 2010s based on combined sales ==
From 2014 streaming has counted towards sales (sometimes called "combined sales" or "chart sales") at the rate of 100 streams equal to one download or physical purchase, although the singles chart no longer uses this ratio. These are the biggest selling songs released in the 2010s based on combined physical, download and streaming sales.

As of September 2017, there were 146 songs released in the 2010s with over a million combined sales, nine of these with over 2 million. In October 2017, "Shape of You" by Ed Sheeran became the first song from the decade to reach 3 million combined sales.

Position	Song	Artist	Peak	Year	Sales	Streaming equivalent	Combined sales
1	"Shape of You"	Ed Sheeran	1	2017	754,754	2,121,706	4,200,000
2	"Uptown Funk"	Mark Ronson featuring Bruno Mars	1	2014	1,647,310	1,076,160	2,723,470
3	"Happy"	Pharrell Williams	1	2013	1,921,805	707,851	2,629,657
4	"Thinking Out Loud"	Ed Sheeran	1	2014	1,219,184	1,302,119	2,521,302
5	"One Dance"	Drake featuring Wizkid & Kyla	1	2016	553,973	1,791,007	2,344,981
6	"Rather Be"	Clean Bandit featuring Jess Glynne	1	2014	1,283,122	935,575	2,218,697
7	"Sorry"	Justin Bieber	1	2015	724,188	1,443,719	2,167,907
8	"All of Me"	John Legend	2	2014	1,259,708	896,418	2,156,126
9	"Love Yourself"	Justin Bieber	1	2015	718,549	1,340,666	2,059,215
10	"Someone Like You"	Adele	1	2011	1,644,597	351,772	1,996,369
11	"Wake Me Up!"	Avicii	1	2013	1,483,346	484,035	1,967,381
12	"Take Me to Church"	Hozier	2	2013	934,466	1,017,851	1,952,317
13	"Blurred Lines"	Robin Thicke featuring T.I. and Pharrell Williams	1	2013	1,667,615	284,004	1,951,619
14	"Cheerleader (Felix Jaehn Remix)"	Omi	1	2014	861,086	1,057,439	1,918,526
15	"Despacito (Remix)"	Luis Fonsi featuring Daddy Yankee and Justin Bieber	1	2017	566,425	1,334,174	1,900,599
16	"Hello"	Adele	1	2015	948,618	906,431	1,855,050
17	"What Do You Mean?"	Justin Bieber	1	2015	533,581	1,320,256	1,853,837
18	"Let Her Go"	Passenger	2	2012	1,243,336	589,019	1,832,354
19	"Get Lucky"	Daft Punk featuring Pharrell Williams	1	2013	1,471,356	349,989	1,821,344
20	"Cheap Thrills"	Sia	2	2015	517,082	1,247,640	1,764,721
21	"Moves Like Jagger"	Maroon 5 featuring Christina Aguilera	2	2011	1,536,041	207,813	1,743,854
22	"Somebody That I Used to Know"	Gotye featuring Kimbra	1	2011	1,515,527	212,192	1,727,719
23	"Pompeii"	Bastille	2	2013	959,693	749,011	1,708,704
24	"7 Years"	Lukas Graham	1	2015	653,657	1,054,211	1,707,868
25	"We Found Love"	Rihanna	1	2011	1,415,416	288,533	1,703,948
26	"Waves"	Mr Probz	1	2013	933,555	757,402	1,690,957
27	"Castle on the Hill"	Ed Sheeran	2	2017	478,716	1,192,607	1,671,322
28	"Stay with Me"	Sam Smith	1	2014	834,622	832,637	1,667,260
29	"Titanium"	David Guetta ft. Sia	1	2011	1,300,566	351,632	1,652,198
30	"Counting Stars"	OneRepublic	1	2013	1,132,526	507,982	1,640,508

== See also ==
- List of best-selling singles of the 2000s (century) in the United Kingdom
- List of best-selling albums of the 2010s in the United Kingdom
