= Ringing in the Sane =

Ringing In The Sane

Studio album by The Hot Lies
- Released: 15 September 2007
- Genres: Post-hardcore, alternative rock, punk rock
- Label: Liberation
- Producer: Phil McKellar

The Hot Lies chronology
Heart Attacks and Callous Acts (2004)	Ringing In The Sane (2007)

Ringing in the Sane is the debut studio album and third release from Australian rock band The Hot Lies, released through Liberation Music on 15 September 2007. Two singles were released to radio from the album, "Emergency! Emergency!" and "Tokyo".

== Track listing ==
No.	Title	Length
1.	"Emergency! Emergency!"	3:04
2.	"Burn for Me"	3:17
3.	"Can't Stand the Heat"	3:25
4.	"Tokyo"	3:03
5.	"Sharks Swim Everywhere"	3:23
6.	"Poison Arrow"	3:26
7.	"For the Restless"	3:03
8.	"Running Low"	3:45
9.	"Diamond Eyes"	2:52
10.	"In a Shadow"	4:24
11.	"Down & Out"	3:31
12.	"Under Your Skin"	3:37

== Charts ==
Chart (2007)	Peak position
Australian charts (ARIA Charts)	35

== Personnel ==
- Peter Wood - Vocals
- Benjamin Pix - Guitar, backing vocals
- Luke Szabo - Guitar
- Leaton Rose - Bass, backing vocals
- Jared Brown - Drums
- Phil McKellar - Producer
