= You and I (Will Young song) =

2002 single by Will Young

- One of artwork variants

Single by Will Young

from the album From Now On
- A-side: "Don't Let Me Down"
- B-side: "If That's What You Want"; "Ready or Not
- Released: 18 November 2002
- Length: 4:06
- Label: 19; S; RCA; BMG
- Songwriters: Mike Peden; Ed Johnson; Henry Johnson
- Producer: Mike Peden

Will Young singles chronology
| "The Long and Winding Road" (2002) | "Don't Let Me Down" / "You and I" (2002) | "Leave Right Now" (2003) |

"You and I" is a song by English singer Will Young. It was written by Ed Johnson, Henry Johnson and Mike Peden and recorded by Young for his on his debut studio album, From Now On (2002). Produced by Peden, the song was released as Young's fourth single and 2002's official Children in Need single on 18 November 2002 along with the non-album track "Don't Let Me Down". It reached number two on the UK Singles Chart, number three in the Netherlands, and the top 30 in Ireland and Italy.

== Background ==
"You and I," written by Ed Johnson, Henry Johnson and Mike Peden and produced latter, is a ballad that talks about "being completely mad in love with someone." With "You and I" selected as Young's first single of original material, he cited the song as a turning point in his career.

== Music video ==
A music video for "You and I" was directed by Tim Royes and filmed while Young was on the Pop Idol Tour with his fellow Pop Idol contestants. The video marked Royes second collaboration with Young, following their work on the video for "The Long and Winding Road" (2002). The visuals portray Young wandering around the streets. English model and actress Agyness Deyn appears in the clip.

== Track listings ==
UK CD1
| No. | Title | Writer(s) | Producer(s) | Length |
|---|---|---|---|---|
| 1. | "Don't Let Me Down" | Will Young; Julian Gallagher; Simon Hale; Dave Morgan; Richard Stannard | Gallagher; Stannard | 4:46 |
| 2. | "You and I" | Peden; Ed Johnson; Henry Johnson | Peden | 4:06 |
| 3. | "If That's What You Want" | Tracy Ackerman; Andy Watkins; Paul Wilson | Absolute | 6:49 |
| 4. | "You and I" (video) |

UK CD2
| No. | Title | Writer(s) | Producer(s) | Length |
|---|---|---|---|---|
| 1. | "Don't Let Me Down" | Young; Gallagher; Hale; Morgan; Stannard | Gallagher; Stannard | 4:46 |
| 2. | "You and I" | Peden; E. Johnson; H. Johnson | Peden | 4:06 |
| 3. | "Ready or Not" | Young; Gallagher; Morgan; Stannard | Gallagher; Stannard | 3:49 |

UK cassette single
| No. | Title | Writer(s) | Producer(s) | Length |
|---|---|---|---|---|
| 1. | "Don't Let Me Down" | Young; Gallagher; Hale; Morgan; Stannard | Gallagher; Stannard | 4:46 |
| 2. | "You and I" | Peden; E. Johnson; H. Johnson | Peden | 4:06 |
| 3. | "If That's What You Want" | Ackerman; Watkins; Paul Wilson | Absolute | 6:49 |

== Credits and personnel ==
Credits are lifted from the From Now On album booklet.

Studio

- Mastered at Transfermation (London, England)

Personnel

- Mike Peden – writing, production
- Ed Johnson – writing
- Henry Johnson – writing
- London Community Gospel Choir – gospel choir
- Tee Green – backing vocals
- Ed Johnson – backing vocals
- Lucie Silvas – backing vocals
- Graham Kearns – guitar
- Jack Daley – bass
- Peter Gordeno – keyboards
- Charlie Russell – programming
- Nick Ingman – string arrangement, conducting
- Gavyn Wright – orchestra leader
- Isobel Griffiths Ltd. – orchestra contracting
- Martin Hayles – recording engineer
- Steve Fitzmaurice – mixing
- Richard Dowling – mastering

== Charts ==
=== Weekly charts ===
Weekly chart performance for "You and I"
| Chart (2002–2003) | Peak position |
|---|---|
| Belgium (Ultratip Bubbling Under Flanders) | 3 |
| Ireland (IRMA) | 27 |
| Italy (FIMI) | 28 |
| Netherlands (Dutch Top 40) | 3 |
| Netherlands (Single Top 100) | 3 |
| UK Singles (OCC) | 2 |

=== Year-end charts ===
Year-end chart performance for "You and I"
| Chart (2002) | Position |
|---|---|
| UK Singles (OCC) | 106 |
| Chart (2003) | Position |
| Netherlands (Dutch Top 40) | 39 |
| Netherlands (Single Top 100) | 29 |

== Certifications ==
Certifications for "You and I"
| Region | Certification | Certified units/sales |
|---|---|---|
| United Kingdom (BPI) | Silver | 200,000^{^} |
^{^} Shipments figures based on certification alone.

== Release history ==
Release dates and formats for "You and I"
| Region | Date | Format(s) | Label(s) | Ref |
|---|---|---|---|---|
| United Kingdom | 18 November 2002 | CD | 19; S; RCA; BMG | |
