= List of best-selling singles of the 2000s (decade) in the United Kingdom =

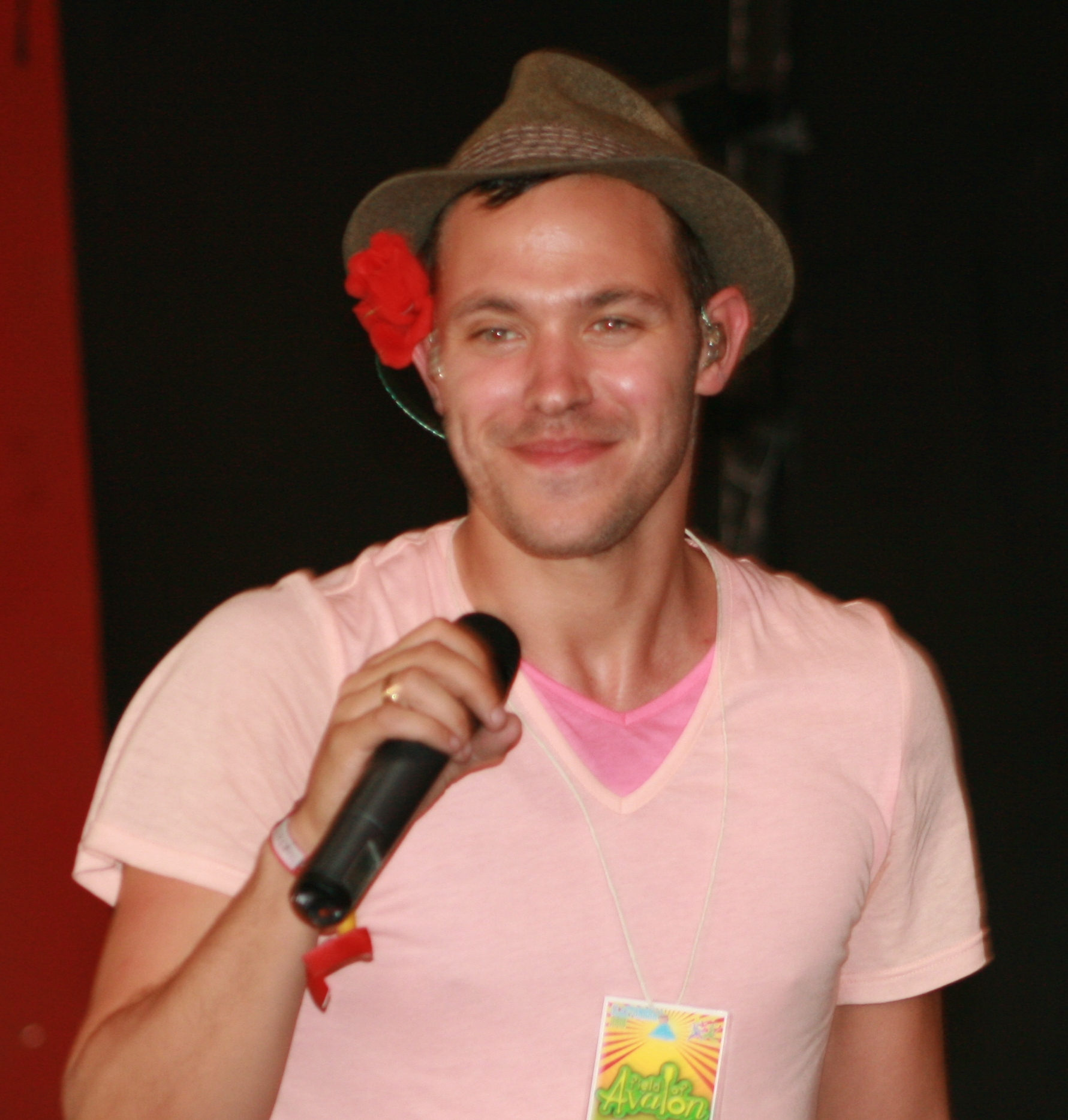
Will Young had the best-selling single of the 2000s in the UK, "Evergreen"/"Anything Is Possible".

The UK Singles Chart is a music chart compiled by the Official Charts Company that calculates the best-selling singles of the week in the United Kingdom. Since 2005, the chart has been based on the sales of both physical and digital singles, originally on the condition that the single was available in both formats. In 2007, the rules were changed so that legal downloads of all songs, irrespective of whether a physical copy was available, were eligible to chart.

Between 2000 and 2009, ten singles that reached the top of the singles chart sold more than 1 million copies in the United Kingdom. At the end of the decade, a retrospective chart was compiled by the Official Charts Company to determine the best-selling single of this ten-year period. The title was won by Will Young, the winner of the televised talent competition Pop Idol in 2001, with his double A-side single "Evergreen"/"Anything Is Possible", released in 2002. The single sold just under 1.8 million copies and saw Young finish ahead of fellow Pop Idol finalist Gareth Gates, whose debut single "Unchained Melody" sold 1.34 million copies. Young's single included sales of 1,108,269 copies in its first week, at the time a first-week total that had been bettered only by Elton John's "Candle in the Wind 1997". The X Factor winners Alexandra Burke (5th), and Shayne Ward (8th) and the band formed on Popstars in 2001, Hear'Say (9th), also reached the top ten. Kylie Minogue, Shaggy and Tony Christie were the other solo artists who made the top ten of best-selling singles; Christie's best-seller was a charity single recorded for Comic Relief in 2005. Children's television character Bob the Builder's "Can We Fix It?", voiced by Neil Morrissey, and Band Aid 20's cover of "Do They Know It's Christmas?" made up the rest of the top ten singles.

The chart is significantly skewed towards singles released at the beginning (2000–2002) and end (2007–2009) of the decade. Digital downloads were included in the charts for the first time in 2005, but it took several years before the download figures made up for the loss of physical single sales. Only six songs released in 2003 and two released in 2004 (including Band Aid 20's million-seller "Do They Know It's Christmas?") made the top 100 best-selling singles, compared with twelve in 2000 and thirteen in 2009. Following changes to the chart ruling in 2007, Rage Against the Machine's 1993 single "Killing in the Name" was declared the Christmas number-one on the strength of an Internet campaign on the Facebook website, even though it did not have a contemporary physical release. The song eventually reached number 35 on the best-sellers list.

BBC Radio 1 announced the chart across three programmes, presented by DJ Nihal, between 29 December and 31 December 2009. The list of best-selling albums of the decade in the UK was also announced in a show on 28 December 2009. As it was broadcast during the last week of December, the chart did not include sales from the final week of the year. An updated chart, including sales up to 31 December 2009 was published in the UK trade magazine Music Week in the issue dated 30 January 2010. Apart from some unsurprising rises in the positions of songs from 2009, this updated chart included some major changes to the one broadcast on Radio 1. "Gotta Get Thru This" by Daniel Bedingfield dropped from 61 to 71, "Anyone of Us (Stupid Mistake)" by Gareth Gates fell from 57 to 61, "Angel" by Shaggy fell from 44 to 54, "A Little Less Conversation" by Elvis vs JXL was moved from 31 to 38, and most notably, the Black Eyed Peas' "Where Is the Love?" dropped from 25 to 42. "How You Remind Me" by Nickelback and "Do You Really Like It?" by DJ Pied Piper and the Masters of Ceremonies dropped out of the top 100 altogether.

One other notable omission from the chart is "Toca's Miracle" by Fragma. According to the OCC, then known as the Chart Information Network (CIN), the single was the seventh best-selling single of 2000, selling 530,742 copies. However, it was not included in the chart of the best-selling singles of the 2000s, despite the inclusion of several of the singles immediately below it in the 2000 best-sellers list, and it is also missing from the official list of the 150 best-selling singles of the 21st century to date that was announced in 2012.

Most appearances in the chart goes to the Black Eyed Peas and Eminem with four entries, followed by S Club 7, Gareth Gates and Leona Lewis with three entries each.

== Chart ==
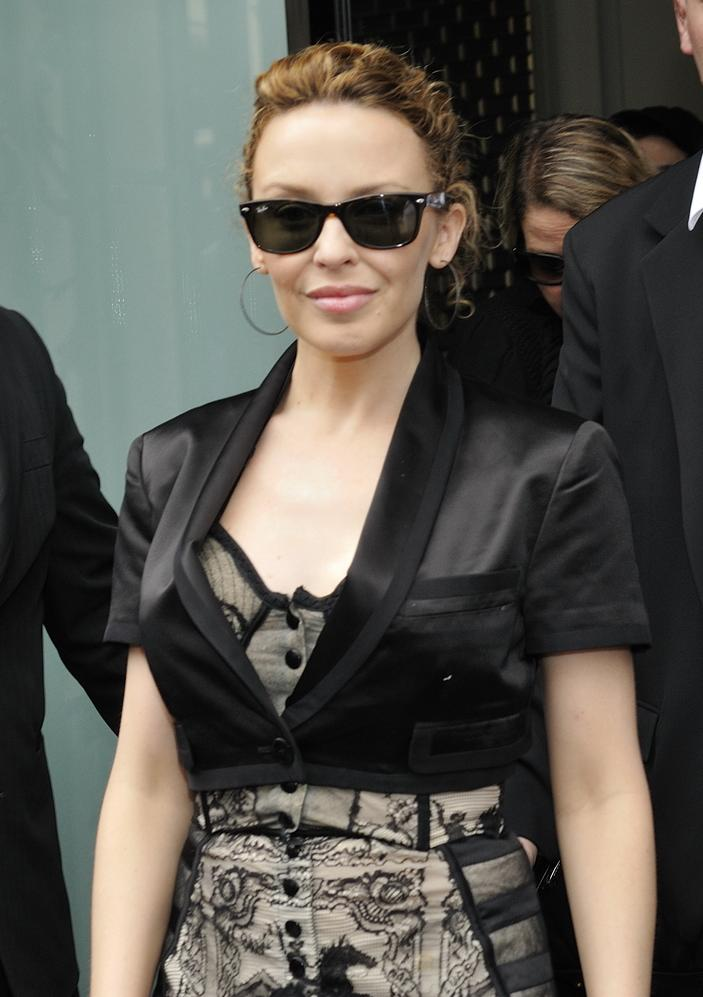
Kylie Minogue had the seventh-best-selling single of the decade with "Can't Get You Out of My Head" in 2001.

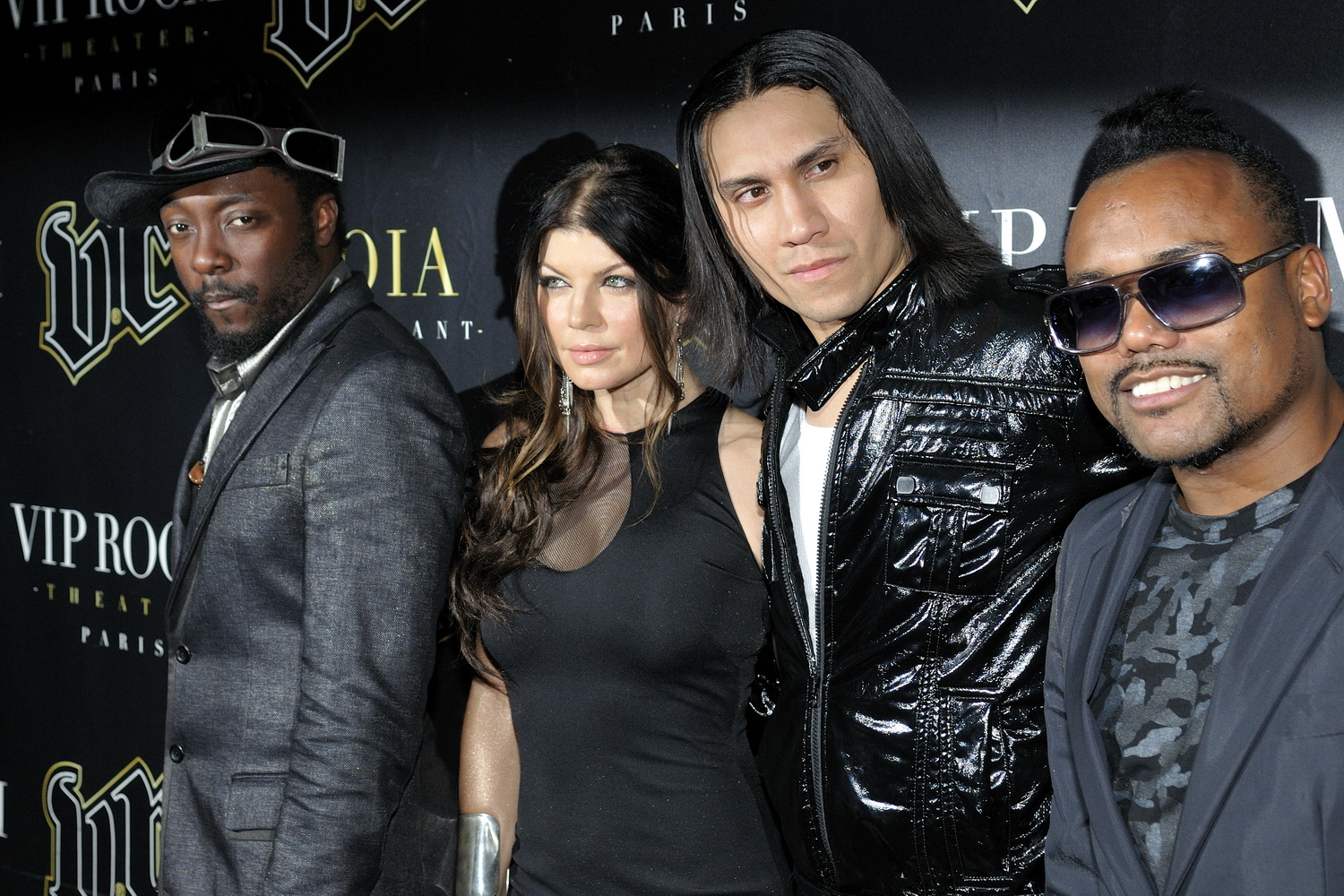
The Black Eyed Peas have four entries in the best-sellers chart. Their highest placed song is 2009's "I Gotta Feeling" at number 17.

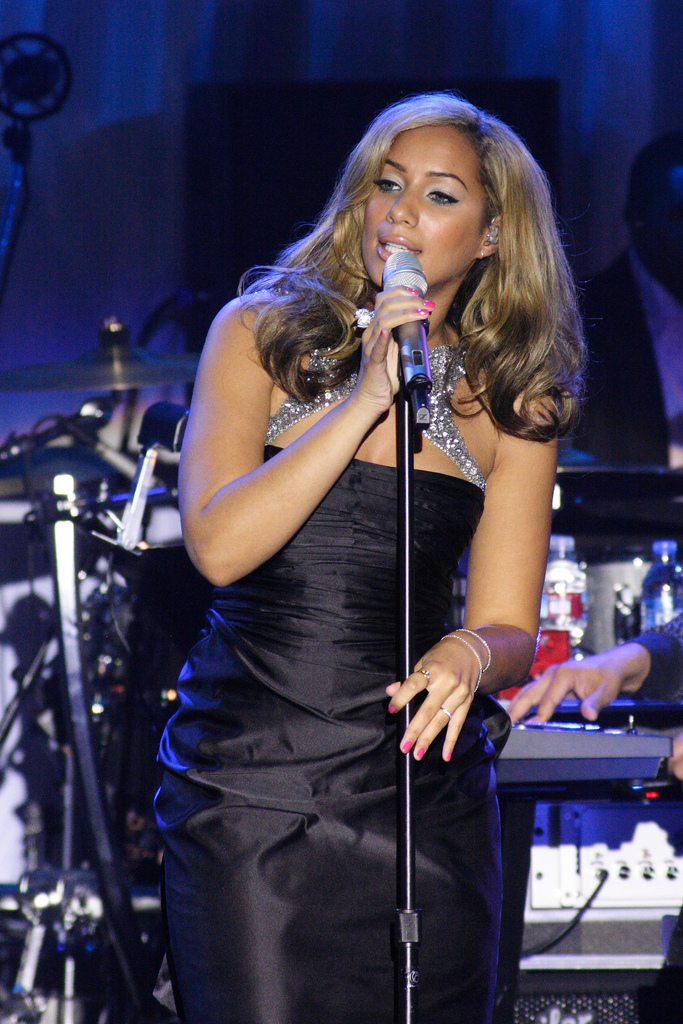
Leona Lewis, the winner of The X Factor in 2006, has three songs in the top 100: "Bleeding Love" (11), "A Moment Like This" (16) and "Run" (44).

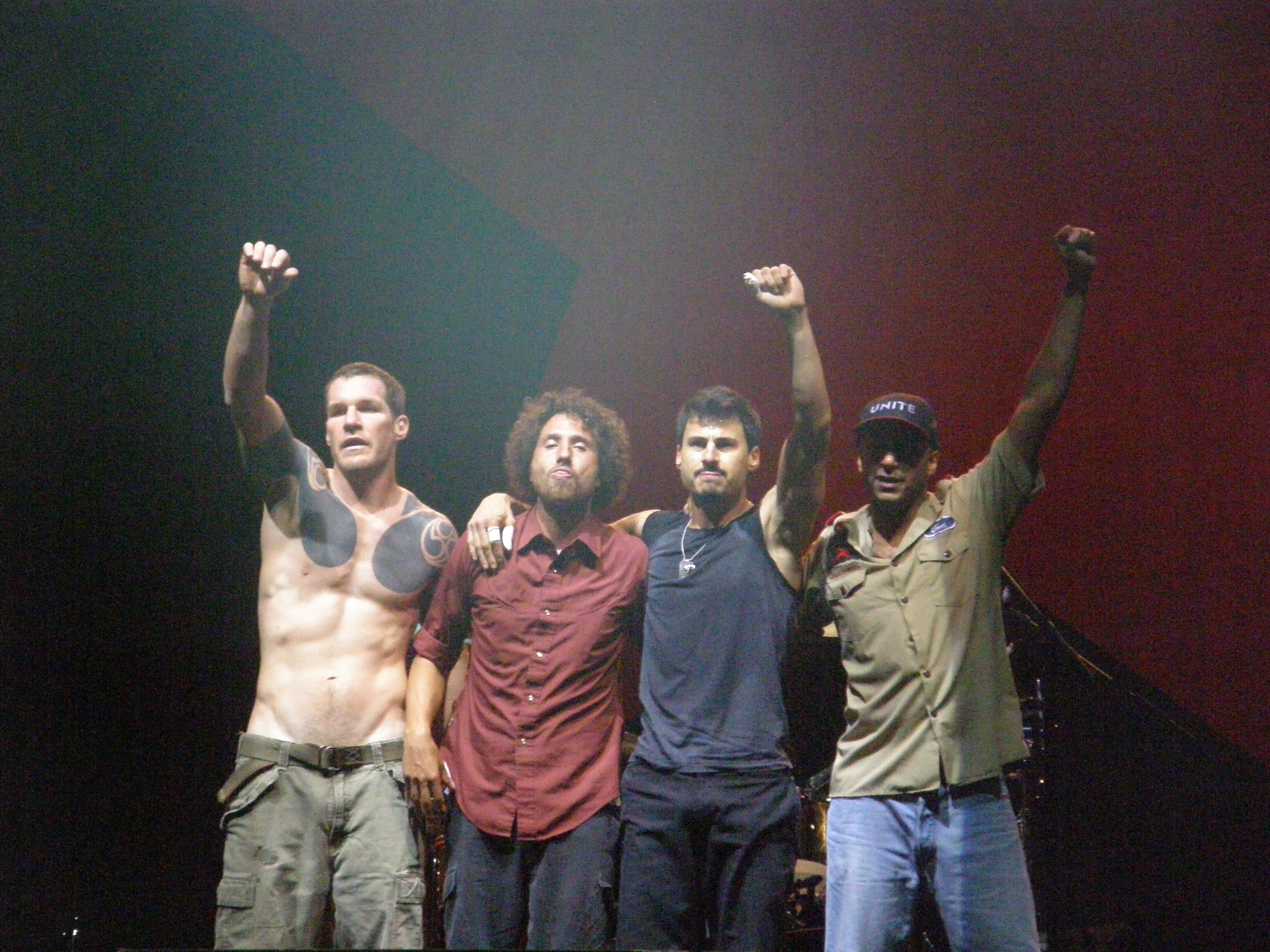
Rage Against the Machine's song "Killing in the Name" – originally released in 1993 – was the Christmas number-one in 2009 and also became the 35th best-seller of the decade.

These are the top 40 biggest-selling songs of the 2000s, according to the Official Charts Company.

No.	Title	Artist	Peak position	Year	Sales
1	"Evergreen"/"Anything Is Possible"	Will Young	1	2002	1,790,000
2	"Unchained Melody"	Gareth Gates	1	2002	1,340,000
3	"It Wasn't Me"	Shaggy featuring Rikrok	1	2001	
4	"(Is This the Way to) Amarillo"	Tony Christie featuring Peter Kay	1	2005	
5	"Hallelujah"	Alexandra Burke	1	2008	
6	"Do They Know It's Christmas?"	Band Aid 20	1	2004	
7	"Can't Get You Out of My Head"	Kylie Minogue	1	2001	
8	"That's My Goal"	Shayne Ward	1	2005	
9	"Pure and Simple"	Hear'Say	1	2001	
10	"Can We Fix It?"	Bob the Builder	1	2000	
11	"Bleeding Love"	Leona Lewis	1	2007	
12	"Crazy"	Gnarls Barkley	1	2006	970,000
13	"Whole Again"	Atomic Kitten	1	2001	
14	"Sex on Fire"	Kings of Leon	1	2008	
15	"Poker Face"	Lady Gaga	1	2009	882,059
16	"A Moment Like This"	Leona Lewis	1	2006	
17	"I Gotta Feeling"	The Black Eyed Peas	1	2009	848,648
18	"Hero"	Enrique Iglesias	1	2002	
19	"Hero"	The X Factor finalists 2008	1	2008	
20	"Stan"	Eminem	1	2000	
21	"Just Dance"	Lady Gaga	1	2009	767,558
22	"Dilemma"	Nelly featuring Kelly Rowland	1	2002	
23	"Hey Baby (Uhh, Ahh)"	DJ Ötzi	1	2001	
24	"Uptown Girl"	Westlife	1	2001	
25	"Where Is the Love?"	The Black Eyed Peas	1	2003	
26	"Don't Stop Movin'"	S Club 7	1	2001	
27	"Fight for This Love"	Cheryl Cole	1	2009	
28	"A Little Less Conversation"	Elvis vs JXL	1	2002	
29	"Pure Shores"	All Saints	1	2000	
30	"Who Let the Dogs Out?"	Baha Men	2	2000	
31	"The Climb"	Joe McElderry	1	2009	
32	"Rule the World"	Take That	2	2007	
33	"Use Somebody"	Kings of Leon	2	2008	
34	"Umbrella"	Rihanna featuring Jay-Z	1	2007	677,600
35	"In for the Kill"	La Roux	2	2009	670,390
36	"It Feels So Good" (remix)	Sonique	1	2000	
37	"Killing in the Name"	Rage Against the Machine	1	2009^{[a]}	
38	"Whenever, Wherever"	Shakira	2	2002	
39	"You're Beautiful"	James Blunt	1	2005	
40	"Sound of the Underground"	Girls Aloud	1	2002	

- ^{A} "Killing in the Name" was originally released in 1993 but it reached the Christmas number-one position in the United Kingdom in 2009.
