= Heart Attacks and Callous Acts =

EP by The Hot Lies
- Released: 2005
- Recorded: July 2005
- Studio: 001 Productions
- Genre: Post-hardcore, Alternative rock, Punk rock
- Length: 15:16
- Label: Liberation Records
- Producer: Kalju Tonuma and The Hot Lies

The Hot Lies chronology
Streets Become Hallways (2004)	Heart Attacks and Callous Acts (2005)	Ringing in the Sane (2007)

Heart Attacks and Callous Acts is the second release by Australian band The Hot Lies. The two radio play singles and video clips of this release are 'Promise Me' and 'Tell Me Goodnight'. It was recorded, mixed and produced by Kalju Tonuma.

== Track listing ==
No.	Title	Length
1.	"Ghosts and Mirrors"	3:35
2.	"Breakaway"	3:18
3.	"Promise Me"	2:13
4.	"Tell Me Goodnight"	2:55
5.	"Taking Chances"	3:13

Notes

- "Tell Me Goodnight" was co-written by Dan Jones.
- "Breakaway" is listed as "Break Away" in the lyric booklet; the correct spelling is listed above.

== Charts ==
Chart (2005/06)	Peak position
Australia (ARIA Charts)	36

== Personnel ==
- Kalju Tonuma – producer, mixing, engineering
- Peter Wood – vocals
- Benjamin Pix – guitar, backing vocals
- Josh Delsar – guitar
- Leaton Rose – bass, backing vocals
- Jared Brown – drums
- Leon Zervos – mastering
- Luke Postill – studio assistant
- Travis Dempsey – drum tech
- Dan Jones – pre-Production
- Ian Miller – live sound
- Tristan Checkley – stage technician
- Damian Slevison – label manager
- Craig Radcliffe – design, layout
- Darren Reid – design, layout
- David Solm – photography
- Nat Thompson – photography
