= The Hot Lies =

- Origin: Adelaide, Australia
- Genres: Post-hardcore, alternative rock, pop punk
- Years active: 2004–2010
- Labels: Liberation (2005–present), Resist (2004)
- Members: Pete Wood; Benjamin Pix; Jared Brown; Leaton Rose; Luke Szabo
- Past members: Josh Delsar; Mikey Valentine; Wolfgang Sapsford
- Website: www.thehotlies.com

The Hot Lies were an alternative rock band based in Australia. The band formed in Adelaide, in early 2004. Their line-up consisted of lead vocalist Pete Wood, rhythm guitarist Benjamin Pix, drummer Jared Brown, lead guitarist Luke Szabo (from Brock Downey) and former I Killed the Prom Queen bassist Leaton Rose. The Hot Lies released two EPs and a full-length album, Ringing in the Sane (September 2007), which reached the top 40 on the ARIA Albums Chart.

== History ==
The Hot Lies formed in early 2004 as an alternative rock band in Adelaide with three former members of The Killchoir Project: Jared Brown on drums, Benjamin Pix on rhythm guitar and Pete Wood on lead vocals; they were joined by Leaton Rose (ex-I Killed the Prom Queen) on bass guitar and Josh Delsar (ex-Day of Contempt) on lead guitar. They released a demo, "Bullets and Blacklines": it was home-recorded, and was put on high rotation by national radio broadcaster, Triple J, in March 2004.

In August 2004 they released an extended play, Streets Become Hallways, which spent 30+ weeks on the AIR Indie Charts, and later re-entered the charts at No. 17. The band toured supported Alexisonfire, After the Fall and 28 Days. Later the Hot Lies toured with Sum 41 and Yellowcard, and then with Good Charlotte and Kisschasy. Blunt magazine and Rolling Stone labelled them one of their bands to watch in 2005.

The Hot Lies released another five-track EP, Heart Attacks and Callous Acts (EP), in September 2005, which appeared in the top 40 on the ARIA Singles Chart. Heart Attacks yielded two music videos: "Promise Me" and "Tell Me Goodnight". It spent 40+ weeks on the Air Indie Charts and later returned there for another 14 weeks. The EP was recorded, mixed and produced by producer Kalju Tonuma.

Their single, "Emergency! Emergency!", was released in August 2007 a month ahead of their debut album, Ringing in the Sane. "Emergency! Emergency!" included the title song, and their cover version of "Time After Time", which was a crowd favourite, and an acoustic version of "Ghosts and Mirrors".

Ringing in the Sane received national radio airplay from 5ADL and Triple J. The album reached the top 40 on the ARIA Albums Chart. One review read "After two impressive build-up EP's, Adelaide's finest emo popstars, The Hot Lies finally unveiled their debut full-length to the world, making lovers of local pop-infused rock everywhere rejoice. Abandoning their harsher post-hardcore beginnings, the yelling and screaming was barely anywhere to be found amongst the minefield of infectious diseases that so easily sucked you in and but so tenaciously refused to let go. With their emphasis on stronger songs, Ringing in the Sane was an instant 'Lies classic." Ringing in the Sane provided two video clips, "Tokyo" and "Emergency! Emergency!" Both received regular airplay on TV music programme, Video Hits.

The group announced their split on their official website in December 2009, and then performed two final gigs in Adelaide in January 2010.

== Discography ==
=== Studio albums ===
Year	Album details	AUS
2007	Ringing in the Sane: Released: 15 September 2007; Label: Liberation	35

=== Singles ===
Year	Title	AUS	Album
2007	"Emergency! Emergency!"	34	Ringing in the Sane
2007	"Tokyo"	—	Ringing in the Sane

=== Extended plays ===
Year	EP details	AUS
2004	Streets Become Hallways: Released: 16 August 2004; Label: Resist	—
2005	Heart Attacks and Callous Acts: Released: 26 September 2005; Label: Liberation	36
