= Evergreen (Westlife song) =

Evergreen Westlife song album

Song by Westlife

from the album World of Our Own
- Released: 2001
- Recorded: Olympic Studios, London, and A Side Productions' Studios, Stockholm
- Length: 4:07
- Label: BMG
- Songwriters: Jorgen Elofsson; Per Magnusson; David Kreuger
- Producers: Per Magnusson; David Kreuger

Audio video
- "Evergreen" on YouTube

"Evergreen" is a song co-written by Jörgen Elofsson, Per Magnusson and David Kreuger, and originally recorded by Irish boy band Westlife. The song appears on their album World of Our Own (2001). It was composed in the traditional verse–chorus form in C major, with band members Shane Filan and Brian McFadden's vocal ranging from the chords of F#_{3} to B_{4}.

== Credits and personnel ==
- Written by Jörgen Elofsson, Per Magnusson and David Kreuger
- Published by BMG Music Publishing / Good Ear Music / Peer Music / Warner-Chappell Music
- Produced and arranged by Per Magnusson and David Kreuger for A Side Productions
- Co-produced by Jörgen Elofsson
- Stockholm Session Orchestra arranged and conducted by Ulf and Henrik Janson
- Recorded at Olympic Studios, London, and A Side Productions' Studios, Stockholm
- Engineered by Peter Lewis
- Assistant engineering by Tim Roe
- Orchestra recorded at R.O.A.M. Studios, Stockholm
- Orchestra engineered by Fredrik Andersson
- Mixed by Bernard Löhr at Olympic Studios, London, and Mono Studios, Stockholm
- Keyboards by Per Magnusson
- Programming by David Kreuger
- Guitars by Esbjörn Öhrwall
- Bass by Tomas Lindberg
- Backing vocals by Anders von Hofsten, Jeanette Olsson and United Colours of Sound
- Mastered by Richard Dowling at Transfermation

== Will Young version ==
"Evergreen"

Single by Will Young

from the album From Now On
- Released: 25 February 2002
- Recorded: 2002
- Length: 4:07
- Label: 19; S; RCA; BMG
- Songwriters: Jörgen Elofsson; Per Magnusson; David Kreuger
- Producers: Per Magnusson; David Kreuger

Will Young singles chronology
"Anything Is Possible" / "Evergreen" (2002)	"Light My Fire" (2002)

In 2002, the song was chosen to be the winner's single for the first series of Pop Idol and was recorded by the show's three finalists: Will Young, Gareth Gates and Darius Danesh. During the final, the song was performed by both Young and Gates. Young went on to win the show, and released "Evergreen" as a double A-side single, along with "Anything Is Possible", which was also recorded by the final three and performed by the final two. The song was later included on Young's debut album, From Now On (2002). Gates' version of the song was also released as a B-side to his single, "Unchained Melody".

=== Background ===
"Evergreen" was written by Swedish musicians Jörgen Elofsson, Per Magnusson, and David Kreuger. Westlife was less impressed with Young's version, dismissing the song chosen for the Pop Idol winner as one of the "weakest" on their third studio album World of Our Own (2001). Band member Kian Egan told BBC News: "When we heard the song at first we always knew it was going to be a great song. But when we recorded, it just wasn't a contender for our singles."

=== Chart performance ===
"Evergreen" went straight to the number one spot in the UK Singles Chart and stayed there for three consecutive weeks, before being knocked off the top spot by Gates' debut single, "Unchained Melody". It was the best-selling song of 2002 and was also the fastest-selling debut in UK chart history, selling 403,027 copies on its day of release and over 1.1 million copies by the end of the week. The song went on to sell over 1.79 million copies and in 2012 it appeared 14th in the official list of the all-time best-selling singles in the UK. It was the biggest selling single of the 21st century in the UK until 2015, when it was overtaken by "Happy" by Pharrell Williams.

=== Music video ===
A music video for "Evergreen" was filmed in February 2002. In 2011, Young expressed his dislike of the video in an interview with Elle magazine, saying: "I can't bear 'Evergreen' or 'Anything Is Possible', they're absolutely shocking. And you wouldn't believe the amount of money that was spent on those videos [...] Dreadful videos. At one moment it looks like I'm in love with a tree! Dreadful. Really odd. Dreadful. No, no, no. No."

=== Track listing ===
CD single
No.	Title	Writer(s)	Producer(s)	Length
1.	"Anything Is Possible"	Cathy Dennis; Chris Braide	Dennis; Oskar Paul	3:41
2.	"Evergreen"	Jörgen Elofsson; Per Magnusson; David Kreuger	Magnusson; Kreuger; Elofsson^{[a]}	4:13

Notes

- ^{^[a]} signifies a co-producer

=== Credits and personnel ===
Credits are lifted from the From Now On album booklet.

- Fredrik Andersson – engineering
- Jörgen Elofsson – co-production, writing
- Henrik Janson – arrangement
- Ulf Janson – arrangement
- David Kreuger – production, programming, writing
- Peter Lewis – engineering
- Tomas Lindberg – bass
- Bernard Löhr – mixing
- Per Magnusson – production, writing
- Esbjörn Öhrwall – guitar
- Jeanette Olsson – backing vocals
- Stockholm Session Orchestra – orchestra
- Tim Roe – engineering assistance
- United Colours of Sound – backing vocals
- Anders von Hofsten – backing vocals

=== Charts ===
==== Weekly charts ====
Weekly chart performance for "Evergreen"
Chart (2002)	Peak position
Europe (Eurochart Hot 100)	13
Ireland (IRMA)	2
Scottish Singles Sales (Official Charts)	1
UK Singles (Official Charts)	1

==== Year-end charts ====
Year-end chart performance for "Evergreen"
Chart (2002)	Position
Ireland (IRMA)	9
UK Singles (OCC)	1

==== Decade-end charts ====
Decade-end chart performance for "Evergreen"
Chart (2000–2009)	Position
UK Singles (OCC)	1

=== Certifications ===
Certifications for "Evergreen"
Region	Certification	Certified units/sales
United Kingdom (BPI)	3× Platinum	1,790,000

=== Release history ===
"Evergreen" release history
Region	Date	Label	Format(s)	Ref(s)
United Kingdom	25 February 2002	19; S; RCA; BMG	CD single	
