= Brock Downey =

Australian rock band

- Origin: Melbourne, Victoria, Australia
- Genres: Rock
- Past members: Danny; Zarbi-J; Kris; Yssy

Brock Downey were an Australian rock band from Melbourne.

Danny Baeffel and Luke Szabo had a duo called Star 10 which released a CD called Open House in 2001. They recruited Kristoff Lajoure and Ysbrand Daniel Brandsma and formed Brock Downey (named after the younger brother of a friend). Their debut single "Don't Bring Me Down" was released in July 2004 and debuted at #91 on the ARIA singles chart. Brandsma left the band later that year and was replaced by Ryan Sheldon in 2005.

Baeffel, Szabo, Lajoure and Sheldon became the Scissor File, releasing an EP From a Whisper to a Scream in 2007. Szabo left to join the Hot Lies. The Scissor File continued on with multiple personnel changes until their break up with only Baeffel remaining from the original lineup. Baeffel went on to perform as Cisco Rose and Szabo took up the stage name Grass Taylor.

== Members ==
- Danny Baeffel – vocals
- Luke "Zarbi-J" Szabo – guitar
- Kristoff "Kris" Lajoie – bass
- Ysbrand "Yssy" Daniel Brandsma – drums
- Ryan "Ry" Sheldon – drums (2005)

== Discography ==
=== Singles ===
List of singles, with selected chart positions
Title	Year	Peak chart positions
Title	Year	AUS
"When U Go"	2004	—
"Don't Bring Me Down"	2004	91
