= Anything Is Possible (Will Young song) =

2002 single by Will Young

Single by Will Young

from the album From Now On
- Released: 25 February 2002
- Recorded: 2002
- Length: 3:42
- Label: 19; S; RCA; BMG
- Songwriter(s): Cathy Dennis; Chris Braide
- Producer(s): Cathy Dennis; Oskar Paul

Will Young singles chronology
"Anything Is Possible" / "Evergreen" (2002)	"Light My Fire" (2002)

"Anything Is Possible" is a song co-written by Chris Braide and Cathy Dennis for the winner of the first series of Pop Idol in the United Kingdom. Will Young won the competition and therefore released the song as his debut single, with production by Dennis and Oskar Paul. It debuted at number one on the UK Singles Chart, and has been certified 3× platinum by the British Phonographic Industry. It has since become the 14th best-selling single of all time in the UK, as well as the second best-selling UK single of the 21st century.

== Background and writing ==
Pop Idol creator Simon Fuller asked Chris Braide and Cathy Dennis to write a song for the show, having been impressed by "Have You Ever", a song the pair had written for S Club 7. The song was recorded by the final three acts in the show, Will Young, Gareth Gates and Darius Danesh. After winning the show, Young released the song as his debut single and it was later included on his debut studio album, From Now On (2002). In an interview with HitQuarters, Braide said the song was written in Dennis' front room at her baby grand piano and recorded on a small Dictaphone. When the song, as recorded by Young, proved an immediate smash hit, Dennis supposedly phoned Braide and said: "You won't believe this, but that little song that we wrote in three hours is selling 100,000 copies a day." In 2011, Young first expressed his dislike of the song, telling Elle magazine: "I've never done "Anything is Possible" live. I hate it. I absolutely hate it." In 2022, he told the Official Charts Company: "I just think it’s such a terrible song. I only ever sang it once [...] It's dreadful. I used to call it "Anything is Puss-able." It’ll never be performed again, unless somebody pays me a huge amount of money. Awful."

== Chart performance ==
The song was performed on the Pop Idol live final by both Young and Gates. Young went on to win the show, and released "Anything Is Possible" as a double A-side single, along with "Evergreen", which was also recorded by the final three and performed by the final two. The single went straight to the number one spot on the UK Singles Chart and stayed there for three consecutive weeks, only to be knocked off the top spot by Gates' debut single, "Unchained Melody". It became the fastest-selling debut in UK chart history, selling 403,027 copies on its day of release. It went on to sell over 1,790,000 copies, and in the official list of the all-time best-selling singles in the UK in November 2012, it appeared 14th. It was the biggest selling single of the 2000s, and was also the biggest selling single of the 21st century until June 2015, when it was overtaken by "Happy" by Pharrell Williams.

== Music video ==
A music video for "Anything Is Possible" was filmed in Cuba in the week of 11 February 2002. In 2011, Young express his dislike of the video in an interview with Elle magazine, saying: "I can't bear "Evergreen" or "Anything is Possible," they're absolutely shocking. And you wouldn't believe the amount of money that was spent on those videos [...] Dreadful videos. At one moment it looks like I'm in love with a tree! Dreadful. Really odd. Dreadful. No, no, no. No."

== Track listing ==
CD single
No.	Title	Writer(s)	Producer(s)	Length
1.	"Anything Is Possible"	Cathy Dennis; Chris Braide	Dennis; Oskar Paul	3:41
2.	"Evergreen"	Jörgen Elofsson; Per Magnusson; David Kreuger	Magnusson; Kreuger; Elofsson^{[a]}	4:13

Notes

- ^{^[a]} signifies a co-producer

== Credits and personnel ==
Credits are lifted from the From Now On album booklet.

Studio

- Mastered at Transfermation (London, England)

Personnel

- Cathy Dennis – writing, backing vocals, programming, production
- Chris Braide – writing
- Lance Ellington – backing vocals
- Sylvia Mason-James – backing vocals
- Friðrik "Frizzy" Karlsson – guitar
- Pete Murray – keyboards
- Oskar Paul – production, programming
- Adrian Bushby – mixing
- Richard Dowling – mastering

== Charts ==
=== Weekly charts ===
Weekly chart performance for "Anything Is Possible"
Chart (2002)	Peak position
Europe (Eurochart Hot 100)	13
Ireland (IRMA)	2
Scotland (OCC)	1
UK Singles (OCC)	1

=== Year-end charts ===
Year-end chart performance for "Anything Is Possible"
Chart (2002)	Position
Ireland (IRMA)	9
UK Singles (OCC)	1

=== Decade-end charts ===
Decade-end chart performance for "Anything Is Possible"
Chart (2000–2009)	Position
UK Singles (OCC)	1

== Certifications ==
Certifications for "Anything Is Possible"
Region	Certification	Certified units/sales
United Kingdom (BPI)	3× Platinum	1,790,000

== Release history ==
"Anything Is Possible" release history
Region	Date	Label	Format(s)	Ref(s)
United Kingdom	25 February 2002	19; S; RCA; BMG	CD single	
