= Let Me Down Easy =

Let Me Down Easy may refer to:

== Music ==
- "Let Me Down Easy" (Bettye LaVette song), 1965
- "Let Me Down Easy", by Spencer Davis Group, from The Second Album (The Spencer Davis Group album) 1966
- "Let Me Down Easy", by Little Milton, 1968
- "Let Me Down Easy" by Cher, from the album Foxy Lady, 1972
- "Let Me Down Easy", by Cornelius Brothers & Sister Rose, from the album Cornelius Brothers & Sister Rose, 1972
- "Let Me Down Easy", by the Ralph McTell, from the album Easy, 1974
- "Let Me Down Easy", by The Isley Brothers, from the album Harvest for the World, 1976
- "Let Me Down Easy", by Shirley Eikhard, from the album Let Me Down Easy, 1976
- "Let Me Down Easy" (Cristy Lane song), 1977
- "Let Me Down Easy", by Jim Glaser, from the album The Man In the Mirror, 1983
- "Let Me Down Easy", by The Stranglers, from the album Aural Sculpture, 1984
- "Let Me Down Easy" (Roger Daltrey song), 1985
- "Let Me Down Easy", by Exposé, from the album What You Don't Know, 1989
- "Let Me Down Easy", by Chris Isaak, from the album Always Got Tonight, 2002
- "Let Me Down Easy", by Saving Jane, from the album SuperGirl, 2008
- "Let Me Down Easy" by Case, from the album The Rose Experience, 2009
- "Let Me Down Easy" (Billy Currington song), 2010
- "Let Me Down Easy" (Paolo Nutini song), 2014
- "Let Me Down Easy" (Sheppard song), 2015
- "Let Me Down Easy", by Jake Gerber, theme from television show on ABC "The Bachelor" 2015
- "Let Me Down Easy (Gang of Youths song)", by Gang of Youths, from the album Go Farther in Lightness, 2017
- "Let Me Down Easy", by Jojo Mason, from the extended play Sky Full of Stars, 2021

== Other ==
- Let Me Down Easy, a solo play written by and starring Anna Deavere Smith
- "Let Me Down Easy (Lie)", a song by Why Don't We
