= Don't Let Me Down (Will Young song) =

2002 single by Will Young

- One of artwork variants

Single by Will Young
- A-side: "You and I"
- B-side: "If That's What You Want"; "Ready or Not"
- Released: 18 November 2002
- Studio: Biffco (Dublin, Ireland)
- Length: 4:46
- Label: 19; S; RCA; BMG
- Songwriters: Richard Stannard; Julian Gallagher; Dave Morgan; Will Young; Simon Hale
- Producers: Richard Stannard; Julian Gallagher

Will Young singles chronology
"The Long and Winding Road" (2002)	"Don't Let Me Down" / "You and I" (2002)	"Leave Right Now" (2003)

"Don't Let Me Down" is a song by English singer Will Young. It was written by Young, Richard Stannard, Julian Gallagher, Dave Morgan, and Simon Hale and released as his fourth single on 18 November 2002 along with the track "You and I". The song reached number two on the UK Singles Chart. The double A-side single was released in aid of Children in Need.

== Track listings ==
UK CD1
No.	Title	Writer(s)	Producer(s)	Length
1.	"Don't Let Me Down"	Will Young; Julian Gallagher; Simon Hale; Dave Morgan; Richard Stannard	Gallagher; Stannard	4:46
2.	"You and I"	Peden; Ed Johnson; Henry Johnson	Peden	4:06
3.	"If That's What You Want"	Tracy Ackerman; Andy Watkins; Paul Wilson	Absolute	6:49
4.	"You and I" (video)

UK CD2
No.	Title	Writer(s)	Producer(s)	Length
1.	"Don't Let Me Down"	Young; Gallagher; Hale; Morgan; Stannard	Gallagher; Stannard	4:46
2.	"You and I"	Peden; E. Johnson; H. Johnson	Peden	4:06
3.	"Ready or Not"	Young; Gallagher; Morgan; Stannard	Gallagher; Stannard	3:49

UK cassette single
No.	Title	Writer(s)	Producer(s)	Length
1.	"Don't Let Me Down"	Young; Gallagher; Hale; Morgan; Stannard	Gallagher; Stannard	4:46
2.	"You and I"	Peden; E. Johnson; H. Johnson	Peden	4:06
3.	"If That's What You Want"	Ackerman; Watkins; Paul Wilson	Absolute	6:49

== Credits and personnel ==
Credits are lifted from the UK CD1 liner notes.

Studios

- Recorded and mixed at Biffco Studios (Dublin, Ireland)
- Mastered at Transfermation (London, England)

Personnel

- Richard "Biff" Stannard – writing (as Richard Stannard), backing vocals, drums, production
- Julian Gallagher – writing, programming, production
- Dave Morgan – writing, guitars
- Will Young – writing, vocals
- Simon Hale – writing, keyboards
- Sharon Murphy – backing vocals
- Steve Lewinson – bass
- Alvin Sweeney – drums, programming, recording, mixing
- Paul J. Brady – recording and mixing assistant
- Richard Dowling – mastering
- Root – artwork design
- Lee Strickland – photography

== Charts ==
=== Weekly charts ===
Weekly chart performance for "Don't Let Me Down"
Chart (2002)	Peak position
Europe (Eurochart Hot 100)	13
Ireland (IRMA)	27
Scotland Singles (OCC)	4
UK Singles (OCC)	2

=== Year-end charts ===
Year-end chart performance for "Don't Let Me Down"
Chart (2002)	Position
UK Singles (OCC)	106

== Certifications ==
Certifications for "Don't Let Me Down"
Region	Certification	Certified units/sales
United Kingdom (BPI)	Silver	200,000^{^}
^{^} Shipments figures based on certification alone.

== Release history ==
Release dates and formats for "Don't Let Me Down"
Region	Date	Format(s)	Label(s)	Ref
United Kingdom	18 November 2002	CD	19; S; RCA; BMG	
