= Chara discography =

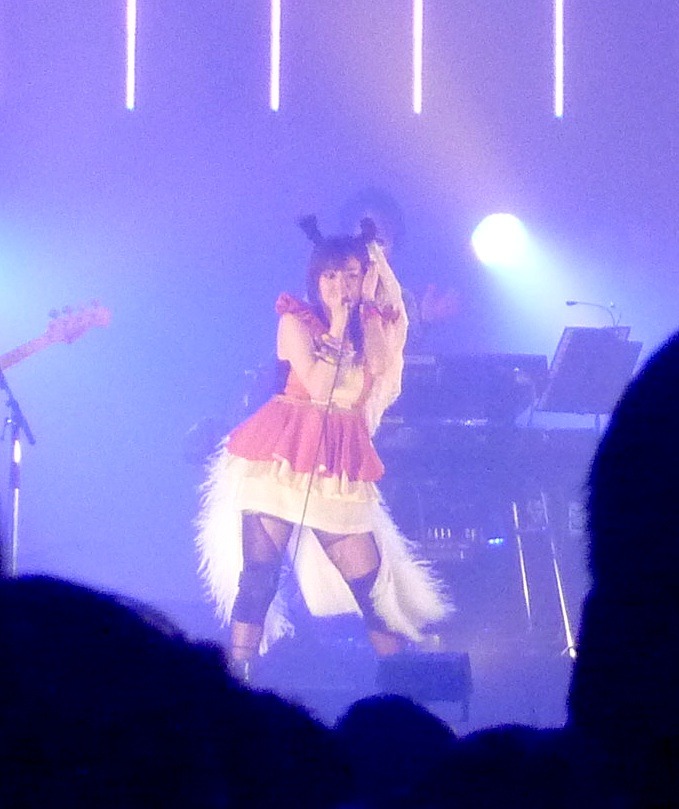
- Chara performing live at Countdown Japan (2011)
- Studio albums: 15
- Extended plays: 3
- Soundtrack albums: 1
- Live albums: 2
- Compilation albums: 4
- Singles: 50
- Video albums: 8
- Self-cover albums: 2

The discography of Japanese musician Chara consists of fifteen studio albums, four compilation albums, two live albums, three extended plays one soundtrack, eight video albums and fifty singles. Chara debuted as a musician in 1991 with Sony Music Entertainment Japan, and saw great success with the singles "Swallowtail Butterfly (Ai no Uta)" (1996), the theme song for the film Swallowtail, and "Yasashii Kimochi" (1997). After releasing ten albums with the label, Chara left Sony in 2004 to become an independent musician, releasing the album Something Blue (2005). The next year, Chara signed her second major label contract with Universal Music Japan, releasing four albums between 2007 and 2011.

After a second brief period where she worked independently, releasing the extended play Utakata (2011), Chara signed a contract with Sony sublabel Ki/oon Music, releasing the albums Cocoon (2012), Jewel (2013) and Secret Garden (2015).

== Albums ==
=== Studio albums ===
List of albums, with selected chart positions
| Title | Album details | Peak positions | Sales (JPN) (Note: Sales provided by Oricon database and are rounded to the nearest thousand copies.) | Certifications |
| Title | Album details | JPN | Sales (JPN) | Certifications |
|---|---|---|---|---|
| Sweet | Released: November 1, 1991 (JPN); Label: Sony Music Japan; Formats: CD, digital download | 64 | 11,000 | |
| Soul Kiss | Released: September 1, 1992 (JPN); Label: Sony; Formats: CD, digital download | 14 | 65,000 | |
| Violet Blue | Released: September 9, 1993 (JPN); Label: Sony; Formats: CD, digital download | 4 | 123,000 | |
| Happy Toy | Released: October 10, 1994 (JPN); Label: Sony; Formats: CD, digital download | 4 | 145,000 | |
| Junior Sweet | Released: September 21, 1997 (JPN); Label: Sony; Formats: CD, MiniDisc, digital download | 1 | 1,055,000 | RIAJ: Million (Note: Junior Sweet later received a 3× Platinum certification for 1,200,000 copies, however the 3× Platinum threshold was changed to 750,000 copies in 2003.) |
| Strange Fruits | Released: March 17, 1999 (JPN); Label: Sony; Formats: CD, MD, digital download | 3 | 317,000 | RIAJ: Platinum |
| Madrigal (マドリガル, Madorigaru) | Released: July 18, 2001 (JPN); Label: Sony; Formats: CD, digital download | 8 | 117,000 | RIAJ: Gold |
| Yoake Mae (夜明けまえ; "Before the Dawn") | Released: March 19, 2003 (JPN); Label: Sony; Formats: CD, digital download | 17 | 47,000 | |
| Something Blue | Released: August 31, 2005 (JPN); Label: independent; Formats: CD | — | | |
| Union | Released: February 28, 2007 (JPN); Label: Universal Japan; Formats: CD, CD/DVD, digital download | 4 | 51,000 | |
| Honey | Released: June 25, 2008 (JPN); Label: Universal; Formats: CD, CD/DVD, digital download | 12 | 38,000 | |
| Carol | Released: December 9, 2009 (JPN); Label: Universal; Formats: CD, CD/DVD, digital download | 20 | 16,000 | |
| Dark Candy | Released: April 13, 2011 (JPN); Label: Universal; Formats: CD, CD/DVD, digital download | 27 | 5,000 | |
| Cocoon | Released: October 31, 2012 (JPN); Label: Ki/oon Music; Formats: CD, digital download | 20 | 6,000 | |
| Secret Garden | Released: March 4, 2015 (JPN); Label: Ki/oon; Formats: CD, CD/DVD, digital download | 39 | 5,000 | |
| Sympathy | Released: July 19, 2017 (JPN); Label: Sony Music Entertainment (Japan); Formats: CD, CD/DVD, digital download | 32 | | |
| Baby Bump | Released: December 19, 2018 (JPN); Label: Universal; Formats: CD, digital download | | | |
"—" denotes items that did not chart.

=== Collaborative Studio albums ===
List of albums, with selected chart positions
| Title | Album details | Peak positions | Sales | Certifications |
| Title | Album details | JPN | Sales | Certifications |
|---|---|---|---|---|
| echo | Released: February 14, 2020 (JPN); Label: Sony Music Japan; Formats: CD, digital download | 7 | | |
"—" denotes items that did not chart.

=== Live albums ===
List of albums, with selected chart positions
| Title | Album details | Peak positions | Sales (JPN) |
| Title | Album details | JPN | Sales (JPN) |
|---|---|---|---|
| Live 97–99 Mood | Released: March 8, 2000 (JPN); Label: Sony; Formats: 2CD, digital download | 20 | 45,000 |
| MTV Unplugged Chara | Released: February 27, 2013 (JPN); Label: Ki/oon; Formats: CD, digital download | 254 | 400 |

=== Compilation albums ===
List of albums, with selected chart positions
| Title | Album details | Peak positions | Sales (JPN) | Certifications |
| Title | Album details | JPN | Sales (JPN) | Certifications |
|---|---|---|---|---|
| Chara the Best Baby Baby Baby XXX | Released: October 10, 1995 (JPN); Label: Sony; Formats: CD, digital download | 5 | 190,000 | RIAJ: Gold |
| Caramel Milk: The Best of Chara | Released: November 1, 2000 (JPN); Label: Sony; Formats: CD, MD, digital download | 2 | 520,000 | RIAJ: Platinum |
| Sugar Hunter: The Best Love Songs of Chara | Released: September 5, 2007 (JPN); Label: Sony; Formats: 2CD, digital download | 14 | 65,000 | |
| Very Special | Released: January 26, 2011 (JPN); Label: Universal; Formats: CD, digital download | 24 | 7,000 | |

=== Self-cover albums ===
List of albums, with selected chart positions
| Title | Album details | Peak positions | | Sales (JPN) |
| Title | Album details | JPN | TWN East Asian | Sales (JPN) |
|---|---|---|---|---|
| A Scenery Like Me | Released: February 18, 2004 (JPN); Label: Sony; Formats: CD, digital download | 27 | — | 19,000 |
| Jewel | Released: November 13, 2013 (JPN); Label: Ki/oon; Formats: CD, digital download | 24 | 12 | 5,000 |

=== Soundtrack albums ===
List of albums, with selected chart positions
| Title | Album details | Peak positions | Sales (JPN) | Certifications |
| Title | Album details | JPN | Sales (JPN) | Certifications |
|---|---|---|---|---|
| Montage | Among Yen Town Band for the film Swallowtail Butterfly; Released: September 16, 1996 (JPN); Label: Sony; Formats: CD, MiniDisc, digital download | 1 | 784,000 | RIAJ: 2× Platinum |

== Extended plays ==
List of EPs, with selected chart positions
| Title | Album details | Peak positions | Sales (JPN) |
| Title | Album details | JPN | Sales (JPN) |
|---|---|---|---|
| The Singles Re-Mixed | Released: September 21, 1995 (JPN); Label: Sony; Formats: 8cm single | 95 | 3,000 |
| Kiss | Released: September 24, 2008 (JPN); Label: Universal; Formats: CD, digital download | 30 | 12,000 |
| Utakata (うたかた; "Bubble") | Released: November 2, 2011 (JPN); Label: Happy Toy; Formats: CD, digital download | 56 | 3,000 |
| Inner Peace | Released: December 15, 2020 (JPN); Label: Happy Toy; Formats: digital download | | |

== Singles ==
=== As a lead artist ===
List of singles, with selected chart positions
| Title | Year | Peak chart positions | | Sales (JPN) | Certifications | Album |
| Title | Year | Oricon Singles Charts | Billboard Japan Hot 100 (Note: Sources for chart positions are as follows: "Yasashii Kimochi", "Trophy", "Labrador", "Breaking Hearts", "Kataomoi", "Alterna Girlfriend", "Chōchō Musubi", "Koibumi", "I Don't Know", "Ai no Ne".) | Sales (JPN) | Certifications | Album |
|---|---|---|---|---|---|---|
| "Heaven" | 1991 | — | — | | | Sweet |
| "Sweet" | 1992 | — | — | | | Sweet |
| "No Toy" | 1992 | — | — | | | Sweet |
| "Ōki na Jishin ga Kitatte" (大きな地震がきたって; "Even If the Earth Shakes") | 1992 | — | — | | | Soul Kiss |
| "Ai no Jibaku Sōchi" (愛の自爆装置; "Love's Suicide Machine") | 1992 | — | — | | | Soul Kiss |
| "Mujintō ni Watashi o Motte Itte..." (無人島に私をもっていって・・・; "Take Me to a Deserted Island...") | 1993 | 66 | — | 14,000 | | Violet Blue |
| "Charlotte no Okurimono" (シャーロットの贈り物; "Charlotte's Web") | 1993 | 70 | — | 10,000 | | Violet Blue |
| "Private Beach" | 1993 | 70 | — | 10,000 | | Violet Blue |
| "Koi o Shita" (恋をした; "I'm in Love") | 1993 | 87 | — | 7,000 | | Violet Blue |
| "Gifted Child" | 1993 | — | — | | | Violet Blue |
| "Tsumibukaku Aishite yo" (罪深く愛してよ; "Love Me Sinfully") | 1994 | 55 | — | 15,000 | | Happy Toy |
| "Atashi Nande Dakishimetai n Darō?" (あたしなんで抱きしめたいんだろう?; "Why Do I Wanna Hug Him?") | 1994 | 41 | — | 38,000 | | Happy Toy |
| "Tiny Tiny Tiny" | 1995 | 62 | — | 13,000 | | Chara the Best |
| "Swallowtail Butterfly (Ai no Uta)" (あいのうた; "Love Song") (among Yen Town Band) | 1996 | 1 | — | 878,000 | RIAJ (physical): Platinum | Montage |
| "Yasashii Kimochi" (やさしい気持ち; "Kind Feelings") | 1997 | 7 | 76 (Note: Charted in 2013.) | 521,000 | RIAJ (physical): Platinum; RIAJ (cellphone): Gold | Junior Sweet |
| "Time Machine" (タイムマシーン, Taimu Mashīn) | 1997 | 12 | — | 204,000 | RIAJ (physical): Gold | Junior Sweet |
| "Milk" (ミルク, Miruku) | 1997 | 48 | — | 17,000 | | Junior Sweet |
| "Duca" | 1998 | 25 | — | 44,000 | | Strange Fruits |
| "Hikari to Watashi" (光と私; "The Light and Me") | 1998 | 17 | — | 54,000 | | Strange Fruits |
| "70% (Yūgure no Uta)" (70%—夕暮れのうた; "70% (Evening Song)") | 1999 | 36 | — | 22,000 | | Strange Fruits |
| "Ai no Hi Mittsu Orange" (愛の火 3つ オレンジ; "Fire of Love, Three, Orange") (Chara+Yuki) | 1999 | 6 | — | 230,000 | RIAJ (physical): Gold | Non-album single |
| "Tsuki to Amai Namida" (月と甘い涙; "The Moon and Sweet Tears") | 2000 | 12 | — | 59,000 | | Caramel Milk |
| "Taisetsu o Kizuku Mono" (大切をきずくもの; Things That Make You Mean More to Me") | 2000 | 14 | — | 51,000 | | Caramel Milk |
| "Lemon Candy" (レモンキャンディ, Remon Kyandi) | 2001 | 32 | — | 26,000 | | Madrigal |
| "Skirt" (スカート, Sukāto) | 2001 | 37 | — | 13,000 | | Madrigal |
| "Boku ni Utsushite" (ボクにうつして; "Reflecting in Me") | 2001 | 78 | — | 2,000 | | Madrigal |
| "Hatsukoi" (初恋; "First Love") | 2002 | 16 | — | 12,000 | | Yoake Mae |
| "Mieru wa" (みえるわ; "I Can See!") | 2003 | 71 | — | 3,000 | | Yoake Mae |
| "Sekai" (世界; "World") | 2006 | 24 | — | 9,000 | | Union |
| "Crazy for You" | 2006 | 24 | — | 4,000 | | Union |
| "Fantasy" | 2007 | 13 | — | 13,000 | | Union |
| "Cherry Cherry" | 2007 | 44 | — | 6,000 | | Honey |
| "Boku no Koto o Shitte" (ボクのことを知って; "Know Me") | 2007 | 44 | — | 7,000 | | Honey |
| "Trophy" | 2008 | 37 | 57 | 3,000 | | Honey |
| "Breaking Hearts" | 2009 | 28 | 78 | 4,000 | | Carol |
| "Kataomoi" (片想い; "Unrequited Love") | 2009 | 47 | 69 | 4,000 | | Carol |
| "Alterna Girlfriend" (オルタナ・ガールフレンド, Orutana Gārufurendo) | 2012 | 102 | 48 | 700 | | Cocoon |
| "Planet" (プラネット, Puranetto) | 2012 | 105 | — | 600 | | Cocoon |
| "Chōchō Musubi" (蝶々結び; "Ribbon Bow") | 2012 | 87 | 96 | 1,000 | | Cocoon |
| "Hug" | 2013 | 148 | — (Note: Charted at number 97 on the Billboard Hot Airplay chart and at number 95 on the Adult Contemporary Airplay chart.) | 400 | | Secret Garden |
| "Koibumi" (恋文; "Love Letter") | 2013 | 118 | 45 | 600 | | Secret Garden |
| "Lucky Girl" (ラッキーガール, Rakkī Gāru) | 2014 | — | — (Note: Charted at number 96 on the Billboard Adult Contemporary Airplay chart.) | | | Secret Garden |
| "Rainbow" | 2014 | — | — | | | Secret Garden |
| "Setsunakute Gomen ne" (せつなくてごめんね; "Sorry It's So Sad") | 2014 | — | — | | | Secret Garden |
| "Ai no Ne" (アイノネ; "Sound of Love") (among Yen Town Band) | 2015 | 28 | 67 | 4,000 | | |
| "A.O.U." | 2022 | 34 | | | | |
"—" denotes items that did not chart, or were released before the creation of the Billboard Japan Hot 100 in 2008.

=== As a featured artist ===
List of singles, with selected chart positions
| Title | Year | Peak chart positions | | Sales (JPN) | Certifications | Album |
| Title | Year | Oricon Singles Charts | Billboard Japan Hot 100 | Sales (JPN) | Certifications | Album |
|---|---|---|---|---|---|---|
| "Parachute Girl" (パラシュート★ガール, Parashūto Gāru) (Yasuyuki Okamura featuring Chara) | 1992 | 25 | — | 29,000 | | Kinjirareta Ikigai |
| "Chara no Boogie Shoes" (チャラのブギー・シューズ; "Chara's Boogie Shoes") (Chara with The 99 1/2) | 1996 | 37 | — | 40,000 | | More (Than 100) |
| "Let Me Know" (Towa Tei featuring Chara) | 1999 | 34 | — | 20,000 | | Last Century Modern |
| "Atari" ("Hit") (Satoshi Tomiie featuring Chara) | 2000 | 68 | — | 11,000 | | Non-album single |
| "Zero Landmine" (among N.M.L.) | 2001 | 1 | — | 556,000 | RIAJ (physical): Platinum | Non-album single |
| "Sapphire no Hoshi" (サファイアの星; "The Sapphire Star") (Tokyo Ska Paradise Orchestra featuring Chara) | 2006 | 16 | — | 20,000 | | Wild Peace |
| "I Don't Know" (Chara x Insist) | 2014 | 30 | 64 | 4,000 | | Non-album single |

=== Promotional singles ===
List of promotional singles with selected chart positions
| Title | Year | Peak chart positions | Album |
| Title | Year | Billboard Japan Hot 100 | Album |
|---|---|---|---|
| "Junior Sweet" | 1997 | — | Junior Sweet |
| "Hikari no Niwa" (光の庭; "Garden of Light") | 2005 | — | Non-album single |
| "Labrador" (ラブラドール, Raburadōru) | 2008 | 67 | Honey |
| "Time After Time" (Chara x Hanaregumi) | 2008 | — (Note: Charted at number 78 on the Billboard Adult Contemporary Airplay chart.) | Kiss |
| "Dengon" (伝言; "Rumor") | 2011 | — | Non-album single |
| "Koi wa Me o Tojite" (恋は目を閉じて; "Love Is Closing Your Eyes") | 2015 | — (Note: Charted at number 98 on the Hot Top Airplay chart.) | Secret Garden |
"—" denotes items that did not chart, or were released before the creation of the Billboard Japan Hot 100 in 2008.

== Other appearances ==
List of non-studio album or guest appearances that feature Chara
| Title | Year | Album |
|---|---|---|
| "Sekaiichi Yōki na Otoko to Sekaiichi Inki na Onna" (世界一陽気な男と世界一陰気な女; "The Cheeriest Boy and the Gloomiest Girl in the World") (Titi Matsumura featuring Chara) | 1993 | Funa no Yō na Onna |
| "Everytime We Say Good-bye" (Titi Matsumura featuring Chara) | 1993 | Funa no Yō na Onna |
| "I Want You" (Oh! Penelope featuring Chara) | 1997 | Milk & Cookies |
| "Jū Ni Gatsu" (12月; "December") (Tadanobu Asano featuring Chara) | 1999 | We Love Butchers |
| "Mind Expansions" (Cosmic Village featuring Chara) | 2004 | Re:KJM |
| "Yasashisa ni Tsutsumareta Nara" (やさしさに包まれたなら; "If You're Wrapped Up in Kindness") (Kumiko Yamashita featuring Chara & Mayumi Chiwaki & You) | 2005 | Duets |
| "Hitomi wa Diamond" (瞳はダイアモンド; "Your Eyes are Diamonds") | 2006 | Jewel Songs: Seiko Matsuda Tribute & Covers |
| "Love to Live By" (M-Flo loves Chara) | 2007 | Cosmicolor |
| "Magicsweets" (Yoko Kanno featuring Chara) | 2007 | CM Yoko |
| "Magicsweets (Masao Nisugi Remix)" (Yoko Kanno featuring Chara) | 2007 | CM Yoko |
| "Love to Live By (FPM Eclectic Electric Mix)" (M-Flo loves Chara) | 2007 | ElectriColor |
| "Otanjōbi no Uta" (おたんじょうびのうた; "Birthday Song") (Note: Special song for childrearing information kit Kodomo Challenge.) | 2008 | Otanjōbi Kinengō (2008 anniversary kit issue) |
| "Crazy for You (Club Edit)" | 2008 | Sound Concierge JAPAN "Japanese Lyric Dance" |
| "Seven Nation Army" (Afra & Incredible Beatbox Band featuring Chara) | 2008 | World Class |
| "Soul Ryder" (Kohey Tsuchiya featuring Chara) | 2008 | "Music Flower" (single) |
| "Seven Nation Army (House Nation Sweet Monday Remix)" (Afra & Incredible Beatbox Band featuring Chara) | 2008 | House Nation Forth Gig |
| "Chaos" (Curly Giraffe featuring Chara) | 2009 | Thank You for Being a Friend E.P. / Thank You for Being a Friend |
| "On Cloud Nine" (Curly Giraffe featuring Chara) | 2009 | Thank You for Being a Friend |
| "Wherever You Go" (Basement Jaxx featuring Chara) | 2014 | Junto |
| "Shinkiro" ("Mirage") (TK from Ling Tosite Sigure featuring Chara) | 2014 | Fantastic Magic |
| "Commit Ballad" (toe featuring Chara) | 2015 | Hear You |

== Video albums ==
List of media, with selected chart positions
| Title | Album details | Peak positions | |
| Title | Album details | JPN DVD | JPN Blu-ray |
|---|---|---|---|
| Kiss | Released: July 21, 1993 (JPN); Label: Sony; Formats: VHS, LaserDisc | — | — |
| Chara's Clips 1991–1997 | Released: September 21, 1997 (JPN); Label: Sony; Formats: VHS | — | — |
| Chara's Clips 1997–2001 | Released: October 11, 2001 (JPN); Label: Sony; Formats: VHS, DVD | — | — |
| Skirt: Short Film | Released: October 11, 2001 (JPN); Label: Sony; Formats: DVD | — | — |
| Live Life: Chara's Union Live House Tour 2007 | Released: August 29, 2007 (JPN); Label: Universal; Formats: DVD | 34 | — |
| Live Life 2: Chara Tour 2008 Honey | Released: July 29, 2009 (JPN); Label: Universal; Formats: DVD | 56 | — |
| Live Tour 2011 "Very Special" | Released: June 6, 2012 (JPN); Label: Universal; Formats: DVD, Blu-ray | 97 | — |
| MTV Unplugged Chara | Released: February 27, 2013 (JPN); Label: Ki/oon; Formats: DVD, Blu-ray | 208 | 144 |
