= Caramel Milk: The Best of Chara =

Greatest hits album by Chara
- Released: November 11, 2000
- Recorded: 1996–2000
- Length: 1:05:01
- Label: Sony Music Japan

Chara chronology
Live 97-99 Mood (2000)	Caramel Milk: The Best of Chara (2000)	Madrigal (2001)

Singles from Caramel Milk
- 1. "Tsuki to Amai Namida" Released: August 23, 2000; 2. "Taisetsu o Kizuku Mono" Released: October 12, 2000

Caramel Milk: The Best of Chara (キャラメル・ミルク・ザ・ベスト・オブ・チャラ, Kyarameru Miruku za Besuto obu Chara) is the second greatest hits album of Japanese singer Chara, which was released on November 11, 2000. It features material from her most commercially successful studio albums: Montage, Junior Sweet and Strange Fruits. It debuted at #2 on the Japanese Oricon album charts, and charted in the top 200 for 12 weeks. It eventually sold a total of 520,000 copies.

Two singles were released prior to the album. Tsuki to Amai Namida (月と甘い涙, The Moon and Sweet Tears), the first, was used as the theme song for the drama Limit: Moshimo, Wagako ga... (リミット もしも、わが子が...). This was the first time that Chara was offered to perform the theme song for a drama. Taisetsu o Kizuku Mono (大切をきずくもの, Things That Make You Mean More to Me) was used in a Kirin commercial advertising black tea drinks. The music video and the booklet illustrations were done in collaboration with Chara's then husband, Tadanobu Asano.

The album features all of Chara's solo singles released in the 1996-2000 period, however, it does not feature Chara's collaboration song with Yuki of the band Judy and Mary, Ai no Hi Mittsu Orange (愛の火 3つ オレンジ, Fire of Love, Three, Orange). This single was extremely successful, selling over 200,000 units in 1999 and 2000.

A song titled Caramel Milk would later appear on Chara's forthcoming 2001 studio album, Madrigal.

== Track listing ==
No.	Title	Lyrics	Music	Arranger(s)	Length
1.	"Yasashii Kimochi (やさしい気持ち, Kind Feelings)"	Chara	Chara	Zentarō Watanabe	3:30
2.	"Taisetsu o Kizuku Mono (大切をきずくもの, Things That Make You Mean More to Me)"	Chara	Chara	Yukio Nagoshi	4:50
3.	"Tsuki to Amai Namida (月と甘い涙, The Moon and Sweet Tears)"	Chara	Chara	Zentarō Watanabe	4:58
4.	"Junior Sweet"	Chara	Chara, Shinichi Osawa	Shinichi Osawa	6:27
5.	"Time Machine (タイムマシーン)"	Chara	Chara, Yukio Nagoshi, Hideki Yoshimura	Hoppy Kamiyama, Yukio Nagoshi	6:07
6.	"Atashi wa Koko yo (あたしはここよ, I'm Here)"	Chara	Chara	Towa Tei, Ayumi Obinata	3:32
7.	"70% (Yūgure no Uta) (70%—夕暮れのうた, 70% (Evening Song))"	Chara	Chara, Zentarō Watanabe	Zentarō Watanabe	4:11
8.	"Milk (ミルク)"	Chara	Chara, Ashley Ingram	Ashley Ingram	3:52
9.	"Shimashima no Bambi (しましまのバンビ, Striped Bambi)"	Chara	Chara	Towa Tei	3:30
10.	"Doko ni Itta n darō? Ano Baka wa (どこに行ったんだろう? あのバカは, Where'd He Go? That Idiot)"	Chara, Kohey Tsuchiya	Chara, Kohey Tsuchiya	Kohey Tsuchiya	4:16
11.	"Duca"	Chara	Chara, Shinichi Igarashi	Anrora Band	4:00
12.	"Hikari to Watashi (光と私, The Light and Me)"	Chara	Chara, Tomoyuki Ishikawa	Anrora Band	5:45
13.	"Shanghai Baby (上海ベイベ)" (Yen Town Band)	Chara	Chara	Takeshi Kobayashi	4:59
14.	"Swallowtail Butterfly (Ai no Uta) (あいのうた, Love Song)" (Yen Town Band)	Chara, Shunji Iwai, Takeshi Kobayashi	Takeshi Kobayashi	Takeshi Kobayashi	4:49

== Singles ==
Date	Title	Peak position	Weeks	Sales
August 23, 2000	"Tsuki to Amai Namida"	12 (Oricon)	5	58,910
October 12, 2000	"Taisetsu o Kizuku Mono"	14 (Oricon)	5	51,150

== Japan Sales Rankings ==
Release	Chart	Peak position	First week sales	Sales total	Chart run
November 11, 2000	Oricon Daily Albums Chart				
November 11, 2000	Oricon Weekly Albums Chart	2	216,970	520,000	12 weeks
November 11, 2000	Oricon Yearly Albums Chart	51			
