= Sugar Hunter: The Best Love Songs of Chara =

Greatest hits album by Chara
- Released: September 5, 2007
- Recorded: 1991–2002
- Length: 2:03:59
- Label: Sony Music Japan
- Producer: Chara

Chara chronology
| Union (2007) | Sugar Hunter: The Best Love Songs of Chara (2007) | Honey (2008) |

Sugar Hunter: The Best Love Songs of Chara (シュガー・ハンター・ザ・ベスト・ラブ・ソングズ・オブ・チャラ, Shugā Hantā za Besuto Rabu Songuzu obu Chara) is a greatest hits album by Japanese singer Chara, featuring her Sony material, which was released on September 5, 2007. It debuted at #14 on the Japanese Oricon album charts, and charted in the top 300 for 12 weeks. It eventually sold 65,328 copies.

The album was released to coincide with the 10 year anniversary of her million selling album, Junior Sweet. It was also released seven months after her comeback album under Universal, Union. Two versions of the album was released: a limited edition 2CD+DVD set, as well as a regular 2-CD set. The DVD featured 18 of Chara's Sony era music videos.

== Track listing ==
Disc Sweet: A Sweet Love Song Collection
| No. | Title | Lyrics | Music | Arranger(s) | Length |
|---|---|---|---|---|---|
| 1. | "Shimashima no Bambi (しましまのバンビ, Striped Bambi)" | Chara | Chara | Towa Tei | 3:30 |
| 2. | "Yasashii Kimochi (やさしい気持ち, Kind Feelings)" | Chara | Chara | Zentarō Watanabe | 3:29 |
| 3. | "Lemon Candy (レモンキャンディ)" | Chara | Yasuyuki Okamura | Shinichi Igarashi, Yukio Nagoshi, Kiyoshi Takakuwa, Ken'ichi Shirane, Chara | 3:52 |
| 4. | "Milk (ミルク)" | Chara | Chara, Ashley Ingram | Ashley Ingram | 3:52 |
| 5. | "Ai no Jibaku Sōchi (愛の自爆装置, Love Suicide Bombing Gear)" | Chara | Chara, U-Ske Asada | U-Ske Asada | 4:36 |
| 6. | "Koi o Shita (恋をした, I'm in Love)" | Chara | Chara, Peter Lorimer | Peter Lorimer | 5:09 |
| 7. | "Taisetsu o Kizuku Mono (大切をきずくもの, Things That Make You Mean More to Me)" | Chara | Chara | Yukio Nagoshi | 4:50 |
| 8. | "Happy Toy" | Chara | Chara, Zentarō Watanabe | Zentarō Watanabe | 5:01 |
| 9. | "Ōki na Jishin ga Kitatte (大きな地震がきたって, Even If There's a Great Earthquake)" | Chara | Chara | U-Ske Asada | 5:04 |
| 10. | "Duca" | Chara | Chara, Shinichi Igarashi | Aurora Band | 3:58 |
| 11. | "Skirt (Album Version) (スカート)" | Chara | James Iha | James Iha, Andy Chase | 5:16 |
| 12. | "Tiny Tiny Tiny" | Chara | Chara | CUB | 5:54 |
| 13. | "Junior Sweet" | Chara | Chara, Shinichi Osawa | Shinichi Osawa | 6:27 |
| Total length: | | | | | 65:52 |

Disc Bitter: A Bitter Love Song Collection
| No. | Title | Lyrics | Music | Arranger(s) | Length |
|---|---|---|---|---|---|
| 1. | "Swallowtail Butterfly (Ai no Uta) (あいのうた, Love Song)" (Yen Town Band) | Shunji Iwai, Takeshi Kobayashi, Chara | Takeshi Kobayashi | Takeshi Kobayashi | 4:48 |
| 2. | "Break These Chain" | Chara | Chara | U-Ske Asada | 5:39 |
| 3. | "Tsuki to Amai Namida (月と甘い涙, The Moon and Sweet Tears)" | Chara | Chara | Zentarō Watanabe | 4:57 |
| 4. | "Time Machine (タイムマシーン)" | Chara | Chara, Yukio Nagoshi, Hideki Yoshimura | Hoppy Kamiyama, Yukio Nagoshi | 6:06 |
| 5. | "Sweet" | Chara | Chara, U-Ske Asada | U-Ske Asada | 4:41 |
| 6. | "Are wa ne (あれはね, Is That Right)" | Chara | Chara | David Motion | 5:33 |
| 7. | "70% (Yūgure no Uta) (70%—夕暮れのうた, 70% (Evening Song))" | Chara | Chara, Zentarō Watanabe | Zentarō Watanabe | 4:10 |
| 8. | "Tsumibukaku Aishite yo (罪深く愛してよ, Love Me Guiltily (Love Me Sinfully))" | Chara | Chara, U-Ske Asada | U-Ske Asada | 5:08 |
| 9. | "Atashi Nande Dakishimetai n darou? (あたしなんで抱きしめたいんだろう?, Why Do I Wanna Hug Him?)" | Chara | Kohey Tsuchiya | Zentarō Watanabe | 4:40 |
| 10. | "Heaven" | Chara, U-Ske Asada | Chara, U-Ske Asada | U-Ske Asada | 4:46 |
| 11. | "Hatsukoi (初恋, First Love)" | Chara | Chara | Hoppy Kamiyama, Chara | 4:41 |
| 12. | "Violet Blue" | Chara | Chara | U-Ske Asada | 6:09 |
| Total length: | | | | | 61:17 |

DVD: Music videos (Limited Edition)
| No. | Title | Length |
|---|---|---|
| 1. | "Heaven" | 4:46 |
| 2. | "Ōki na Jishin ga Kitatte (大きな地震がきたって, Even If There's a Great Earthquake)" | 5:06 |
| 3. | "Ai no Jibaku Sōchi (愛の自爆装置, Love Suicide Bombing Gear)" | 4:36 |
| 4. | "Tsumibukaku Aishite yo (罪深く愛してよ, Love Me Guiltily (Love Me Sinfully))" | 5:09 |
| 5. | "Atashi Nande Dakishimetai n darou? (あたしなんで抱きしめたいんだろう?, Why Do I Wanna Hug Him?)" | 4:42 |
| 6. | "Yasashii Kimochi (やさしい気持ち, Kind Feelings)" | 3:29 |
| 7. | "Time Machine (タイムマシーン)" | 6:07 |
| 8. | "Milk (ミルク)" | 3:52 |
| 9. | "Duca" | 4:00 |
| 10. | "Hikari to Watashi (光と私, The Light and Me)" | 5:45 |
| 11. | "70% (Yūgure no Uta) (70%—夕暮れのうた, 70% (Evening Song))" | 4:11 |
| 12. | "Tsuki to Amai Namida (月と甘い涙, The Moon and Sweet Tears)" | 4:58 |
| 13. | "Taisetsu o Kizuku Mono (大切をきずくもの, Things That Make You Mean More to Me)" | 4:50 |
| 14. | "Lemon Candy (レモンキャンディ)" | 4:47 |
| 15. | "Skirt (スカート)" | 4:03 |
| 16. | "Boku ni Utsushite (ボクにうつして, Reflecting in Me)" | 4:37 |
| 17. | "Hatsukoi (初恋, First Love)" | 4:41 |
| 18. | "Mieru wa (みえるわ, I Can See!)" | 5:01 |
| Total length: | | 84:30 |

== Japan Sales Rankings ==
| Release | Chart | Peak position | First week sales | Sales total |
|---|---|---|---|---|
| September 5, 2007 | Oricon Daily Albums Chart | 11 | | |
| September 5, 2007 | Oricon Weekly Albums Chart | 14 | 20,113 | 65,328 |
| September 5, 2007 | Oricon Yearly Albums Chart | 185 | | |

=== Various charts ===
| Chart | Peak position | First week sales |
|---|---|---|
| Soundscan Album Top 20 (CD+DVD version only) | 14 | 18,649 |
