= A Scenery Like Me =

Studio album by Chara
- Released: February 18, 2004
- Recorded: 2003–2004
- Genre: J-pop
- Length: 54:11
- Label: Sony Music Japan
- Producer: Chara

Chara chronology
Yoake Mae (2003)	A Scenery Like Me (2004)	Something Blue (2005)

Singles from A Scenery Like Me
- 1. "Are wa ne" Released: 2004 (radio single)

A Scenery Like Me (ア・シーナリー・ライク・ミー, A Shīnarī Raiku Mī) is a self-cover album by Chara, which was released on February 18, 2004. It debuted at #27 on the Japanese Oricon album charts, and charted in the top 300 for 5 weeks. It eventually sold 19,000 copies.

The album features new versions of material from her first four studio albums, Sweet, Soul Kiss, Violet Blue and Happy Toy; as well as two new songs, Ao (青, Blue) and Ai no Hikōsen (愛の飛行船, Blimp of Love). The new versions featured a stripped down arrangement, self-produced by Chara and performed with her band.

Two songs were used as promotional tracks. The self-cover of Are wa ne (あれはね, Is That Right) was used as a radio single, and a music video was filmed for it. The self-cover of Tsumibukaku Aishite yo (罪深く愛してよ, Love Me Sinfully) was used as the opening theme song for the NHK interview show Mayonaka no Ōkoku (真夜中の王国, Midnight Kingdom).

== Track listing ==
No.	Title	Lyrics	Music	Arranger(s)	Length
1.	"Break These Chain"	Chara	Chara	U-Ske Asada	7:07
2.	"Are wa ne (あれはね, Is That Right)"	Chara	Chara	D.Motion	5:36
3.	"Tsumibukaku Aishite yo (罪深く愛してよ, Love Me Sinfully)"	Chara	Chara, U-Ske Asada	U-Ske Asada	6:00
4.	"Ao (青, Blue)"	Chara	Chara		2:14
5.	"Private Beach"	Chara	Chara	U-Ske Asada	3:18
6.	"No Promise"	Chara	Chara, Mizuho Hirata	U-Ske Asada	5:23
7.	"Ai no Hikōsen (愛の飛行船, Blimp of Love)"	Chara, Ema	Chara		3:06
8.	"Time After Time"	Chara	Chara	D.Motion	6:23
9.	"Happy Toy"	Chara	Chara, Zentarō Watanabe	Zentarō Watanabe	6:46
10.	"Usotsuku no ni Narenaide (うそつくのに慣れないで, Don't Get Used to Lying)"	Chara	Chara	U-Ske Asada	4:36

== Japan Sales Rankings ==
Release	Chart	Peak position	First week sales	Sales total
March 19, 2003	Oricon Weekly Albums Chart	27	8,798	19,220
