= Chara the Best Baby Baby Baby XXX =

Greatest hits album by Chara
- Released: October 10, 1995
- Recorded: 1991–1995
- Genre: J-pop; Synthpop; Alternative pop
- Length: 72:40
- Label: Sony Music Japan

Chara chronology
Happy Toy (1994)	Chara the Best Baby Baby Baby XXX (1995)	Montage (1996)

Singles from Baby Baby Baby XXX
- 1. "Tiny Tiny Tiny" Released: July 21, 1995; 2. "The Singles Re-Mixed" Released: September 21, 1995

Professional ratings
Review scores
Source	Rating
Allmusic	3/5 stars

Chara the Best Baby Baby Baby XXX (チャラ・ザ・ベスト・ベイビー・ベイビー・ベイビー, Chara za Besuto Beibī Beibī Beibī) is the first best album of Chara, which was released on October 10, 1995. It features material from her first four studio albums, Sweet, Soul Kiss, Violet Blue and Happy Toy; as well as some new material. It debuted at #5 on the Japanese Oricon album charts, and charted in the top 200 for 13 weeks. It eventually sold 190,000 copies.

Two singles were released prior to the album. Tiny Tiny Tiny, an original single, was released in July, and reached #62 on the Oricon singles charts. A few weeks before the album, a remix EP called The Singles Re-Mixed was released.

The album does not feature all of Chara's singles released up until this point. No Toy (Re-Mix), Ōki na Jishin ga Kitatte (大きな地震がきたって, Even If There's a Great Earthquake), Mujintō ni Watashi o Motte Itte... (無人島に私をもっていって・・・, Take Me to a Deserted Island...) and Gifted Child are left out entirely. From Charlotte no Okurimono/Private Beach (シャーロットの贈り物, Charlotte's Web), only Charlotte no Okurimono is featured, however it is featured as the remixed version from The Singles Re-Mixed.

The album appears to be named because of her songs Baby Baby (featured on Happy Toy) and Soul Kiss xxx, however neither songs are on this collection. Soul Kiss xxx is the only album title track not present.

== Track listing ==
No.	Title	Lyrics	Music	Arranger(s)	Length
1.	"Ai no Jibaku Sōchi (愛の自爆装置, Love Suicide Bombing Gear)"	Chara	Chara, U-Ske Asada	U-Ske Asada	4:36
2.	"Are wa ne (あれはね, Is That Right)"	Chara	Chara	David Motion	5:36
3.	"Iya (いや, Bad)"	Chara	Chara, U-Ske Asada	U-Ske Asada	5:28
4.	"Sweet"	Chara	Chara, U-Ske Asada	U-Ske Asada	4:42
5.	"Violet Blue"	Chara	Chara	U-Ske Asada	6:08
6.	"Charlotte no Okurimono (In the Mix) (シャーロットの贈り物, Charlotte's Web)" (in the mix)	Chara	Chara, U-Ske Asada	remixed by Tetsuji Fujita	5:26
7.	"Tsumibukaku Aishite yo (罪深く愛してよ, Love Me Sinfully)"	Chara	Chara, U-Ske Asada	U-Ske Asada	5:09
8.	"Happy Toy"	Chara	Chara, Zentarō Watanabe	Zentarō Watanabe	5:03
9.	"Break These Chain"	Chara	Chara	U-Ske Asada	5:39
10.	"Koi o Shita (恋をした, I'm in Love)"	Chara	Chara, Peter Lorimer	Peter Lorimer	5:11
11.	"Atashi Nande Dakishimetai n darou? (あたしなんで抱きしめたいんだろう?, Why Do I Wanna Hug Him?)"	Chara	Kohey Tsuchiya	Zentarō Watanabe	4:42
12.	"Heaven"	Chara, U-Ske Asada	Chara, U-Ske Asada	U-Ske Asada	4:46
13.	"Family"	Chara	Chara	David Motion	4:37
14.	"Tiny Tiny Tiny"	Chara	Chara	CUB	5:55

== Singles ==
Date	Title	Peak position	Weeks	Sales
July 21, 1997	"Tiny Tiny Tiny"	62 (Oricon)	3	13,350
September 21, 1995	"The Singles Re-Mixed"	95 (Oricon)	1	3,020

== Japan Sales Rankings ==
Release	Chart	Peak position	First week sales	Sales total	Chart run
October 10, 1995	Oricon Daily Albums Chart				
October 10, 1995	Oricon Weekly Albums Chart	5	77,640	190,000	13 weeks
October 10, 1995	Oricon Yearly Albums Chart				
