= Let Me Know (Towa Tei song) =

Single by Towa Tei featuring Chara

from the album Last Century Modern
- Released: June 23, 1999
- Genre: Contemporary R&B; nu jazz; trip hop
- Length: 4:10
- Label: Warner Music Japan
- Songwriters: Towa Tei, Chara
- Producer: Towa Tei

Towa Tei featuring Chara singles chronology
"A Ring" (1999)	"Let Me Know" (1999)	"Kasei" (2000)

Chara singles chronology
"70% (Yūgure no Uta)" (1999)	"Let Me Know" (1999)	"Ai no Hi Mittsu Orange (with Yuki)" (1999)

Let Me Know is a song by Japanese electronic musician Towa Tei, featuring singer Chara on vocals. It was released as the fourth single from his album Last Century Modern on June 23, 1999, a month before the album's release. It debuted at #34 on the Japanese Oricon album charts, and charted for four weeks. It did substantially better on the J-Wave airplay charts, charting in the top 30 for eight weeks.

Tei had produced Chara's songs Shimashima no Bambi (しましまのバンビ, Striped Bambi) (from her 1997 album Junior Sweet) and Atashi wa Koko yo (あたしはここよ, I'm Here) (from her 1999 album Strange Fruits, released three months before this single).

Let Me Know was used as the ending theme song for the variety show Hey! Hey! Hey! Music Champ and The Adventures of Laughing Dog: YARANEVA!!.

The song also appears on the 1999 remix album Lost Control Mix with the remix Let Me Know (Mighty Bop Remix) (remixed by Bob Sinclar), as well as the original version appearing on Tei's 2001 best-of album, Towa Tei Best.

== Track listing ==
=== Single ===
No.	Title	Length
1.	"Let Me Know"	4:10
2.	"Let Me Know (TT Remix)"	5:59
3.	"Let Me Know (TT Bossa)"	3:41
4.	"Let Me Know (TT Instrumental)"	4:10

== Chart rankings ==
=== Oricon Charts (Japan) ===
Release	Chart	Peak position	First week sales	Sales total
June 23, 1999	Oricon Weekly Singles Chart	34	8,150	19,590
