= Kiss (Chara EP) =

EP by Chara
- Released: September 24, 2008
- Recorded: 2008
- Genre: Alternative pop
- Length: 23:23
- Label: Universal Music

Chara chronology
Honey (2008)	Kiss (2008)	Carol (2009)

Kiss (キス, Kisu) is the second EP released by Chara, which was released on September 24, 2008 (two months after her 12th original album, Honey). It was her first EP marketed as a mini-album as opposed to a single. It debuted at #30 on the Japanese Oricon album charts, and charted in the top 300 for six weeks.

The EP comprises three covers and two versions of one original song. Kieru (きえる, Disappear) was used as the theme song for the film version of the novel Snakes and Earrings (蛇にピアス, Hebi ni Piasu). The song Kiss is a different version of Kieru, featuring the same arrangement but different lyrics. The lyrics of both songs were written in collaboration with Snakes and Earrings author Hitomi Kanehara, with Kanehara primarily writing Kieru and Chara primarily writing Kiss.

The cover tracks are Tomorrow, a cover of the song from the 1977 musical Annie, Time After Time, a cover of the hit 1984 single by Cyndi Lauper and Ya Ya (Ano Toki o Wasurenai) (あの時代を忘れない, I Won't Forget Those Times), a cover of Japanese rock band Southern All Stars' 1982 single. Tomorrow was used in Astellas Pharma commercials. Time After Time, a duet with Super Butter Dogs vocalist Hanaregumi, had already been released on the 2008 compilation album We Love Cyndi – Tribute to Cyndi Lauper released two months prior.

== Music video ==
Chara in the music video.

A music video for the title track Kiss was created, and shot by Fumiko Hirano. It is a grayscale film, depicting Chara with a lover at a windy beach. The couple embrace and lightly caress each other, through wide camera arcs. A minute and a half into the video, they slowly begin to kiss. The scene is interspersed with other scenes of the pair caressing. The pair watch an offshore tornado arrive, and are covered in written paper notes. Objects float by in the distance, such as a motorcycle and a house. A door floats down to them, showing a different sunlit beach through it.

== Track listing ==
CD
No.	Title	Lyrics	Music	Arranger(s)	Length
1.	"Kiss"	Chara, Hitomi Kanehara	Chara	Chara	5:23
2.	"Tomorrow" (from the musical Annie)	Martin Charnin	Charles Strouse	Zentarō Watanabe	3:02
3.	"Time After Time (featuring Hanaregumi)" (Cyndi Lauper cover)	Rob Hyman, Cyndi Lauper	Rob Hyman, Cyndi Lauper	Makoto Minagawa, Chara	5:01
4.	"Ya Ya (Ano Toki o Wasurenai) (あの時代を忘れない; "I Won't Forget Those Times")" (Southern All Stars cover)	Keisuke Kuwata	Keisuke Kuwata	Chara	4:36
5.	"Kieru (きえる; "Disappear")"	Hitomi Kanehara, Chara	Chara	Chara	5:21

== Japan Sales Rankings ==
Release	Chart	Peak position	First week sales	Sales total
September 24, 2008	Oricon Daily Albums Chart	13		
September 24, 2008	Oricon Weekly Albums Chart	30	5,845	12,052
September 24, 2008	Oricon Yearly Albums Chart	719		
