= Breaking hearts (disambiguation) =

"Breaking hearts" is a common metaphor for the intense emotional pain or suffering one feels after losing a loved one.

Breaking hearts may also refer to:

- Breaking Hearts, a 1984 soft rock album
- "Breaking Hearts" (song), 2009 J-pop song
