= 70% (Yūgure no Uta) =

Single by Chara

from the album Strange Fruits
- Released: February 24, 1999; March 17, 1999 (vinyl)
- Genre: Trip hop, downtempo
- Length: 4:11
- Label: Sony Music Japan
- Songwriters: Chara, Zentarō Watanabe
- Producer: Zentarō Watanabe

Chara singles chronology
"'Hikari to Watashi'" (1998)	"70% (Yūgure no Uta)" (1999)	"'Let Me Know'" (1999)

Alternative cover
- vinyl cover

''70% (Yūgure no Uta)'' (70%—夕暮れのうた, 70% (Evening Song); pronounced Nana Jū Pāsento Yūgure no Uta) is a song by Japanese singer Chara. It was released as the third single from her album Strange Fruits on February 17, 1999. It debuted at #36 on the Japanese Oricon album charts, and charted for three weeks.

In official descriptions of the song, it is described as having "a cool sound with painful vocals," as well as fusing a club sound with a Beatles-style melody.

== Release ==
The single was released as the lead track from Strange Fruits in February 1999, a month before the album's release.

The song was released on vinyl a month later, on the same day as the album's release. The vinyl's cover was taken from the same photoshoot as the album's was. The vinyl features an exclusive DJ Hasebe remix of the title track, along with an unpublished duet with her then husband, Tadanobu Asano ("Afureteiru" (あふれている, Overflowing)) as well as two remixes of an album track, "Tsutawatte" (つたわって, Walking Along). Tadanobu Asano wrote and composed "Afureteiru" for Chara himself.

The B-side of the single, "Chisa na Tenohira (1998.10.22)" (小さな手のひら, Little Palms), was a live recording at NHK Hall of a song from her 'Yen Town Band' concept album Montage. Other recordings from this concert date are found on Chara's live album, Live 97-99 Mood.

Other than on Strange Fruits, the song also features on Chara's greatest hits albums Caramel Milk: The Best of Chara and Sugar Hunter: The Best Love Songs of Chara.

== Music video ==
Chara in the music video.

The music video was shot by directorial pair Blaine & Justin. It features Chara in night scenes throughout Tokyo. She begins in a lit park, holding a large purple sketch book. As she puts the book down, a superimposed image of her begins to travel beyond her. The superimposed version of herself visits various scenes throughout Tokyo, including an escalator, night trains and the park from the beginning. During this time, she sketches houses, hearts and writes cursive script in the sketch book. The video ends with non-superimposed Chara waking up in the park at dawn.

As of April 20, 2010 the music video for "70% (Yūgure no Uta)" has been viewed 147,000 times on popular video-sharing website YouTube.

== Track listing ==
=== Single ===
No.	Title	Writer(s)	Arranger	Length
1.	"70% (Yūgure no Uta) (70%—夕暮れのうた, 70% (Evening Song))"	Chara, Zentarō Watanabe	Watanabe	4:11
2.	"Chisa na Tenohira (1998.10.22) (小さな手のひら, Little Palms)"	Chara	Takeshi Kobayashi	3:49

=== Vinyl ===
Side A
No.	Title	Writer(s)	Arranger(s)	Length
1.	"70% (Yūgure no Uta) (Original Version) (70%—夕暮れのうた, 70% (Evening Song))"	Chara, Watanabe	Watanabe
2.	"70% (Yūgure no Uta) (Instrumental) (70%—夕暮れのうた, 70% (Evening Song))"	Chara, Watanabe	Watanabe
3.	"70% (Yūgure no Uta) (DJ Hasebe Re-Mix Version) (70%—夕暮れのうた, 70% (Evening Song))"	Chara, Watanabe	DJ Hasebe

Side B
No.	Title	Writer(s)	Arranger(s)	Length
1.	"Afureteiru (あふれている, Overflowing)"	Tadanobu Asano	Asano
2.	"Tsutawatte (Ambience Mix) (つたわって, Walking Along)"	Chara, Tomoyuki Ishikawa	Aurora Band
3.	"Tsutawatte (Dub Mix) (つたわって, Walking Along)"	Chara, Tomoyuki Ishikawa	Aurora Band

== Chart Rankings ==
=== Oricon Charts (Japan) ===
Release	Chart	Peak position	First week sales	Sales total	Chart run
February 17, 1999	Oricon Daily Singles Chart				
February 17, 1999	Oricon Weekly Singles Chart	36	13,690	21,630	3 weeks
February 17, 1999	Oricon Yearly Singles Chart				
