= Carol (Chara album) =

Studio album by Chara
- Released: December 9, 2009
- Recorded: 2009
- Genres: Alternative pop, rock, Christmas music, dream folk
- Length: 43:45
- Label: Universal Music

Chara chronology
| Kiss (2008) | Carol (2009) | Dark Candy (2011) |

Singles from Carol
- 1. "Breaking Hearts" Released: July 29, 2009; 2. "Kataomoi" Released: November 18, 2009

Professional ratings
Review scores
| Source | Rating |
|---|---|
| Rolling Stone Japan | 3.5/5 stars |

Carol (キャロル, Kyaroru) is the 13th studio album by Chara, which was released on December 9, 2009. Carol was released in two versions: a limited edition CD+DVD version as well as a regular CD Only version. The DVD will feature documentary footage of Chara recording the album, along with interviews.

The album was preceded by two singles: "Breaking Hearts" and "Kataomoi." "Kataomoi" was used as the ending theme song for the anime Kimi ni Todoke. An album track, "I Miss You," was used in commercials for cosmetics company Orbis' Aqua Force Extra Lotion facial cleanser, which starred Chara herself.

== Track listing ==
All tracks are written by Chara, unless otherwise noted.

CD
| No. | Title | Lyrics | Arranger(s) | Length |
|---|---|---|---|---|
| 1. | "Gift" | | Chara | 2:51 |
| 2. | "Breaking Hearts" | | Swing-O a.k.a.45, Chara | 4:18 |
| 3. | "Kataomoi (片想い, Unrequited Love)" | | Koichi Tsutaya | 3:16 |
| 4. | "Hikōkigumo (ひこうき雲, Contrail)" | | Chara | 4:14 |
| 5. | "Elegance (エレガンス)" | | Chara | 3:28 |
| 6. | "Nigakute Amai (苦くて甘い, Bitter Sweet)" | | Chara | 2:51 |
| 7. | "Lemon Tea (レモンティー)" | | Chara | 3:14 |
| 8. | "Mister Lonely (ミスターロンリー)" | | Zentarō Watanabe | 3:54 |
| 9. | "LiLiCo" | | Chara | 3:17 |
| 10. | "I Miss You" | | Seiji Kameda | 4:12 |
| 11. | "Nagametai (眺めたい, Want to Gaze)" | | Chara | 2:34 |
| 12. | "Carol" | EMA, Chara | Yūji Toriyama | 5:15 |

DVD (Limited Edition only)
| No. | Title | Length |
|---|---|---|
| 1. | "Chara: close reporting" |
| 2. | "Special interview" |

== Singles ==
| Date | Title | Peak position | Weeks | Sales |
|---|---|---|---|---|
| July 29, 2009 | "Breaking Hearts" | 28 (Oricon) | 3 | 3,929 |
| November 18, 2009 | "Kataomoi" | 47 (Oricon) | 2 | 4,077 |

== Japan sales rankings ==
| Release | Chart | Peak position | First week sales | Sales total |
|---|---|---|---|---|
| December 9, 2009 | Oricon Daily Albums Chart | 14 | | |
| December 9, 2009 | Oricon Weekly Albums Chart | 20 | 7,314 | 15,403 |
