= Madrigal (album) =

Studio album by Chara
- Released: July 18, 2001
- Recorded: 2001
- Length: 58:29
- Label: Sony Music Japan

Chara chronology
Caramel Milk: The Best of Chara (2000)	Madrigal (2001)	Yoake Mae (2003)

Singles from Madrigal
- 1. "Lemon Candy" Released: April 25, 2001; 2. "Skirt" Released: July 4, 2001; 3. "Boku ni Utsushite" Released: October 11, 2001

Madrigal (マドリガル, Madorigaru) is the eighth studio album by Japanese singer Chara, which was released on July 18, 2001. It debuted at #8 on the Japanese Oricon album charts, and charted in the top 300 for 8 weeks.

The first and most successful single from Madrigal was Lemon Candy (レモンキャンディ). While Chara wrote the song entirely herself, the arrangement was split between six people: Chara, rock musician Yasuyuki Okamura, Shinichi Igarashi (who formerly collaborated on Duca with Chara, two members of the band Great3 (Kiyoshi Takakuwa, Ken'ichi Shirane) and the guitarist for Kiyoshi Takakuwa's solo project, Curly Giraffe, Yukio Nagoshi. It reached #32, and sold over 25,000 copies.

Skirt was released a few weeks before the album's release, and was used in a Pocari Sweat commercial. It was a collaboration between Chara and former Smashing Pumpkins guitarist James Iha. Iha also worked with Chara on an album track, Boku ni Utsushite, which was later released as a recut single in October.

The album track Yellow Balloon (イエローバルーン) was used as the second ending theme for the anime series PaRappa the Rapper.

Artist Ed Tsuwaki created the cover and booklet for Madrigal, along with the singles Skirt and Boku ni Utsushite.

== Track listing ==
All lyrics are written by Chara

No.	Title	Music	Arranger(s)	Length
1.	"Boku ni Utsushite (ボクにうつして, Reflecting in Me)"	James Iha	James Iha, Andy Chase	4:37
2.	"Skirt (スカート)" (album version)	James Iha	James Iha, Andy Chase	5:16
3.	"Kanashimi to Bi (悲しみと美, Sadness and Beauty)"	Chara, Zentarō Watanabe	Zentarō Watanabe	3:54
4.	"Caramel Milk (キャラメルミルク)"	Andy Chase	Andy Chase	4:30
5.	"Tameiki no Mi (ため息の実, Sigh Fruit)"	Chara	Andy Chase	3:59
6.	"Lemon Candy (レモンキャンディ)"	Yasuyuki Okamura	Shinichi Igarashi, Yukio Nagoshi, Kiyoshi Takakuwa, Ken'ichi Shirane, Chara	4:47
7.	"Kono Asobi o Koi to Waratte (この遊びを恋とわらって, Laugh with Love in This Game)"	Andy Chase	Andy Chase	4:21
8.	"Kokoro no Ki (心の木, Heart Tree)"	Chara	David Motion	4:28
9.	"Tadd"	Chara	Chara	3:34
10.	"Mishin (ミシン, Sewing Machine)"	Ken'ichi Shirane	Ken'ichi Shirane	4:29
11.	"Yellow Balloon (イエローバルーン)"	Chara, Shigekazu Aida	Shigekazu Aida	4:30
12.	"Atashi no Kawaii Te (あたしのかわいい手, My Cute Hands)"	Chara	Shigekazu Aida	5:56
13.	"Skirt (スカート)" (original version)	James Iha	James Iha, Andy Chase	4:03

== Singles ==
Date	Title	Peak position	Weeks	Sales
April 25, 2001	"Lemon Candy"	32 (Oricon)	4	26,430
July 4, 2001	"Skirt"	37 (Oricon)	3	13,360
October 11, 2001	"Boku ni Utsushite"	78 (Oricon)	1	2,460

== Japan sales rankings ==
Release	Chart	Peak position	First week sales	Sales total
July 18, 2001	Oricon Weekly Albums Chart	8	52,470	116,580

=== Various charts ===
Chart	Peak position	First week sales
Soundscan Album Top 20	7	53,144
