= Junior Sweet =

Studio album by Chara
- Released: September 21, 1997
- Recorded: 1997
- Genre: J-pop
- Length: 53:49
- Label: Sony Music Japan
- Producer: Shinichi Osawa

Chara chronology
Montage (1996)	Junior Sweet (1997)	Strange Fruits (1999)

Singles from Junior Sweet
- 1. "Yasashii Kimochi" Released: April 23, 1997; 2. "Time Machine" Released: July 21, 1997; 3. "Milk" Released: November 6, 1997

Professional ratings
Review scores
Source	Rating
Allmusic	4.5/5 stars

Junior Sweet (ジュニア・スウィート, Junia Sūīto) is the sixth studio album by Chara, which was released on September 21, 1997. It debuted at #1 on the Japanese Oricon album charts for two weeks, and charted in the top 200 for 26 weeks. The album is Chara's most popular, and eventually sold 1,055,000 units in Japan.

The album was released at the height of Chara's popularity, after starring in the movie Swallowtail Butterfly and singing the hit theme song for the movie (Swallowtail Butterfly (Ai no Uta) (あいのうた, Love Song)).

Her first single for this album was Yasashii Kimochi, released in April 1997. The pop song was used in a Shiseido 'Tessera J' commercial, boosting its popularity. The song was arranged by Zentarō Watanabe, member of the band Oh! Penelope. Chara had assisted on their album Milk & Cookies, released a month prior, lending her vocals to the song I Want You. The B-side to this single, Junior Sweet, was later also used for this ad campaign. The B-side later became the eponymous title track for the album, five months later. The single eventually sold more than 500,000 copies, making it Chara's second biggest single.

Time Machine was used as a promotional single for the album, released a month before the album's release. It is an acoustic ballad, and was written in collaboration with Bloodthirsty Butchers vocalist Hideki Yoshimura and his former bandmate Yukio Nagoshi (when a part of the band Copass Grinderz). It reached #12 on the single charts and saw some success, but nothing rivalling Yasashii Kimochi's. Chara later covered the Bloodthirsty Butchers song Jū Ni Gatsu (12月, December) with her then husband, actor Tadanobu Asano. The song was released on a 1999 tribute album for the band, entitled We Love Butchers.

A month and a half after the album was released, Milk, another acoustic ballad, was released as a re-cut single. The song was written as a collaboration between Chara and the writer of Des'ree's You Gotta Be, Ashley Ingram.

Yasashii Kimochi was released with an extended introduction on the album. Junior Sweet and Watashi wa Kawaii Hito to Iwaretai (私はかわいい人といわれたい, I Wanna Be Called Cute) were released as B-sides to Chara's Yasashii Kimochi and Time Machine singles, respectively. Watashi wa Kawaii Hito to Iwaretai's originally released version was 6:01 in length.

== Track listing ==
No.	Title	Lyrics	Music	Arranger(s)	Length
1.	"Milk (ミルク)"	Chara	Chara, Ashley Ingram	Ashley Ingram	3:52
2.	"Yasashii Kimochi (やさしい気持ち, Kind Feelings)" (Shiawase Version (しあわせ・ヴァージョン, Happy Version))	Chara	Chara	Zentarō Watanabe	4:03
3.	"Shimashima no Bambi (しましまのバンビ, Striped Bambi)"	Chara	Chara	Towa Tei	3:30
4.	"Watashi no Namae wa Obaka-san (私の名前はおバカさん, My Name Is Ms. Stupid)"	Chara	Chara	David Motion	4:25
5.	"Time Machine (タイムマシーン)"	Chara	Chara, Hideki Yoshimura, Yukio Nagoshi	Yukio Nagoshi, Hoppy Kamiyama	6:07
6.	"Katte ni Kita (勝手にきた, Came On Their Own)"	Chara	Chara	Chara	3:02
7.	"Doko ni Itta n darō? Ano Baka wa (どこに行ったんだろう? あのバカは, Where'd He Go? That Idiot)"	Chara, Kohey Tsuchiya	Kohey Tsuchiya	Kohey Tsuchiya	4:16
8.	"Watashi wa Kawaii Hito to Iwaretai (私はかわいい人といわれたい, I Wanna Be Called Cute)" (Original Version)	Chara	Chara, Shinichi Osawa	Shinichi Osawa	5:46
9.	"Junior Sweet"	Chara	Chara, Shinichi Osawa	Shinichi Osawa	6:27
10.	"Hana no Yume (花の夢, Flower Dream)"	Chara	Chara	David Motion	5:46
11.	"Ai no Kizuna (愛の絆, Bonds of Love)"	Chara	Chara	Ashley Ingram	4:51
12.	"Setsunai Mono (せつないもの, Painful Thing)"	Chara	Chara	Chara	1:44

== Singles ==
Date	Title	Peak position	Weeks	Sales
April 23, 1997	"Yasashii Kimochi"	7 (Oricon)	16	520,540
July 21, 1997	"Time Machine"	12 (Oricon)	13	203,850
November 6, 1997	"Milk"	48 (Oricon)	4	16,630

== Japan sales rankings ==
Release	Chart	Peak position	First week sales	Sales total
September 21, 1997	Oricon Daily Albums Chart	1	254,450	1,055,000
September 21, 1997	Oricon Weekly Albums Chart	1	254,450	1,055,000
September 21, 1997	Oricon Yearly Albums Chart	23	254,450	1,055,000
