= Union (Chara album) =

Studio album by Chara
- Released: February 28, 2007
- Recorded: 2006–2007
- Genres: ambiental music, electronica, rock, dream pop, dance
- Length: 48:56
- Label: Universal Music

Chara chronology
Something Blue (2005)	Union (2007)	Sugar Hunter: The Best Love Songs of Chara (2007)

Alternative Cover
- limited CD+DVD cover

Singles from Union
- 1. "Sekai" Released: September 13, 2006; 2. "Crazy for You" Released: November 15, 2006; 3. "Fantasy" Released: January 17, 2007

Union (ユニオン, Yunion) is the 11th studio album by Japanese singer Chara, which was released on February 28, 2007. It debuted at #4 on the Japanese Oricon album charts, and charted in the top 300 for 8 weeks.

Union was her first album with Universal Music, after releasing music with Sony since 1991. It was released in two versions: a limited edition CD+DVD version, as well as a regular CD Only version. The DVD featured the music videos for the three singles, "Sekai", Crazy for You and Fantasy.

Sekai, released 5 1/2 months before the album, was Chara's first release under Universal. It was used in commercials for the NTT Docomo service "NEC N702is" cellphone. The second single, Crazy for You, was created in collaboration with Shibuya-kei DJ Tomoyuki Tanaka (i.e. Fantastic Plastic Machine) and The Brilliant Green guitarist Ryo Matsui. Tanaka produced the song, while Matsui wrote the music.

Fantasy, the third single preceding the album's release by a month, was a minor hit for Chara. It was used in Kanebo cosmetics commercials for their T'estimo eye-makeup range, featuring Chara as a spokesperson in the commercials. It was a collaboration between Chara and music producer Seiji Kameda, bassist for the band Tokyo Jihen. It managed to reach #13 on Oricon's single charts.

The final track of the album, Niji o Wataru Heiwa ga Kita (虹をわたる平和がきた, The Rainbow-Crossing Peace Has Come), was used as the theme song for the Japanese film Freesia (フリージア).

== Track listing ==
All lyrics are written by Chara.

CD
No.	Title	Lyrics	Music	Arranger(s)	Length
1.	"Watashi o Mitsumete (私を見つめて, Stare at Me)"	Chara	Tatsuki Hashimoto, Chara	Tatsuki Hashimoto, Chara	3:50
2.	"Fantasy"	Chara	Jun Sasaki, Chara	Seiji Kameda	5:52
3.	"Crazy for You"	Chara	Ryo Matsui	Tomoyuki Tanaka, Tatsuki Hashimoto	3:19
4.	"Tear Drop"	Chara	Shinichi Osawa, Chara	Shinichi Osawa	4:47
5.	"Boy"	Chara	Chara	Chara	3:12
6.	"Amai Amai (甘い甘い, Sweet Sweet)"	Chara	Chara	Chara	4:30
7.	"O-ri-on"	Chara	Chara	Seiji Kameda	4:43
8.	"Back"	Chara	Chara	Zentarō Watanabe	4:47
9.	"This Is My Car"	Chara	Chara	Chara	2:04
10.	"Sekai (世界, World)"	Chara	Chara	Tatsuki Hashimoto, Chara	3:11
11.	"Union"	Chara	Low Jack Three, Chara	Low Jack Three, Chara	4:23
12.	"Niji o Wataru Heiwa ga Kita (虹をわたる平和がきた, The Rainbow-Crossing Peace Has Come)"	Chara	Chara	Chara	3:58

DVD: Music videos
No.	Title	Length
1.	"Sekai (世界, World)"	3:11
2.	"Crazy for You"	3:19
3.	"Fantasy"	5:52

== Singles ==
Date	Title	Peak position	Weeks	Sales
September 13, 2006	"Sekai"	24 (Oricon)	5	9,607
November 15, 2006	"Crazy for You"	46 (Oricon)	3	3,680
January 17, 2007	"Fantasy"	13 (Oricon)	5	12,710

== Japan Sales Rankings ==
Release	Chart	Peak position	First week sales	Sales total	Chart run
February 28, 2007	Oricon Daily Albums Chart	3			
February 28, 2007	Oricon Weekly Albums Chart	4	26,485	50,963	8 weeks
February 28, 2007	Oricon Yearly Albums Chart				

=== Various charts ===
Chart	Peak position	First week sales
Soundscan Album Top 20 (CD+DVD version only)	7	23,645
