= Honey (Chara album) =

Studio album by Chara
- Released: June 25, 2008
- Recorded: 2007–2008
- Genre: Pop, ballad, rock, ambiental music, ska
- Length: 52:16
- Label: Universal Music

Chara chronology
Sugar Hunter: The Best Love Songs of Chara (2007)	Honey (2008)	Kiss (2008)

Alternative Cover
- limited CD+DVD cover

Singles from Honey
- 1. "Cherry Cherry" Released: August 29, 2007; 2. "Boku no Koto o Shitte" Released: November 14, 2007; 3. "Trophy" Released: January 16, 2008; 4. "Labrador" Released: May 13, 2008 (digital download); 5. "Call Me" Released: July 2008 (promo single)

Honey (ハニー, Hanī) is the 12th studio album by Chara, which was released on June 25, 2008. It debuted at #12 on the Japanese Oricon album charts, and charted in the top 300 for 10 weeks.

Honey was released in two versions: a limited edition CD+DVD version as well as a regular CD Only version. The DVD featured the music videos for the three physical singles, Cherry Cherry, Boku no Koto o Shitte and Trophy, along with the music video for the digital download song Labrador. Missing are the videos for X'mas Spirit!, the B-side of Boku no Koto o Shitte, and Call Me.

The album is filled with tie-up songs. The single Trophy was used in commercials for the Toyota bB car, and Cherry Cherry was used in childrearing information kit Kodomo Challenge commercials. Ai o Oboeru was used in Kodomo Challenge commercials promoting the birthday anniversary release of the kit. Call Me was used as the theme song for the news show News Zero, and Aoi Kakera was used as the opening theme song for the anime Telepathy Shōjo Ran.

Labrador was written for Chara by rock band Radwimps' vocalist Yōjirō Noda. It was released as a radio single from Honey and reached #67 on the Billboard Japan Singles Top 100 chart.

Chara's daughter Sumire is featured on the cover of the album.

== Track listing ==
CD
No.	Title	Lyrics	Music	Arranger(s)	Length
1.	"Sumire" (Intro)		Chara	Chara	0:52
2.	"Trophy" (album version)	Chara	Rui Momota	Kōichi Tsutaya	4:48
3.	"Labrador (ラブラドール)"	Yōjirō Noda	Yōjirō Noda	Yōjirō Noda	3:46
4.	"Cherry Cherry"	Chara	Chara	Seiji Kameda	3:57
5.	"Ai o Oboeru (愛を憶える, Remember Love)"	Chara	Chara	Chara	3:18
6.	"Marmalade (マーマレード)"	Chara	Chara	Chara	3:35
7.	"Boku no Koto o Shitte (ボクのことを知って, Know Me)"	Chara	Ken'ichi Shirane	Masanori Shimada	5:03
8.	"Aoi Kakera (青いかけら, Blue Pieces)"	Chara	Chara	Tatsuki Hashimoto	5:25
9.	"Soshite, Boku ga Todokanai (そして、僕が届かない, Then I Can't Reach It)"	Chara	Kōichi Tsutaya	Kōichi Tsutaya	4:35
10.	"Amai Karai (甘い辛い, Sweet Spicy)"	Chara	Chara	Chara	5:05
11.	"Nakidashisō. (泣き出しそう。, Burst Into Tears)"	Chara	Chara	Chara	3:31
12.	"Maha"	Chara	Chara	Chara	3:21
13.	"Call Me"	Chara	Chara	Chara	5:00

DVD: Music videos
No.	Title	Length
1.	"Cherry Cherry"	3:57
2.	"Boku no Koto o Shitte (ボクのことを知って, Know Me)"	5:03
3.	"Trophy (Album Version)"	4:40
4.	"Labrador (ラブラドール)"	3:46

== Singles ==
Date	Title	Peak position	Weeks	Sales
August 29, 2007	"Cherry Cherry"	44 (Oricon)	4	5,675
November 14, 2007	"Boku no Koto o Shitte"	44 (Oricon)	6	6,504
January 16, 2008	"Trophy"	37 (Oricon)	3	3,468

== Japan Sales Rankings ==
Release	Chart	Peak position	First week sales	Sales total	Chart run
June 25, 2008	Oricon Daily Albums Chart	7			
June 25, 2008	Oricon Weekly Albums Chart	12	19,104	38,108	10 weeks
June 25, 2008	Oricon Yearly Albums Chart	248			
