= Something Blue (Chara album) =

Studio album by Chara
- Released: August 31, 2005
- Recorded: 2005
- Genre: Art pop, experimental
- Length: 29:27
- Label: Independent
- Producer: Chara

Chara chronology
A Scenery Like Me (2004)	Something Blue (2005)	Union (2007)

Something Blue (サムシング・ブルー, Samushingu Burū) is the tenth album by Chara, which was released on August 31, 2005. It was released independently, and only 2,000 copies were produced. These were distributed between her online fan-club, as well as at live concerts.

Chara describes Something Blue's style as much darker than her other work. She self-produced the album, completely writing and arranging it, along with recording it in her own home.

She created the album despite not having a music contract, as "music was her life, and something she couldn't just stop." Chara describes that time in her life as painful and depressing, and re-listening to the recordings brought back such memories. This is her rationale as to why the album has not been re-released since.

Two months prior to the release of this album, Chara had released a digital single, Hikari no Niwa (光の庭, Garden of Light). This was used as the theme song for the Japanese release of the movie March of the Penguins. While this was not included in the album, an extended EP of this was later released on iTunes. It featured three Something Blue tracks (Love Me, Issho ni Kurasō (いっしょに暮らそう, Let's Live Together), Mirror Ball). The EP has since been removed from iTunes.

The guitar chords from the song Ongaku (音楽, Music) were later used in her comeback single under Universal Japan, Sekai (世界, World). The song Kimi Warau Boku Miteru. (君笑う ボクみてる。, You Laugh, I'm Looking.) is a self-cover of the song Mama Says that Chara wrote for Misia for her Singer for Singer album in 2004.

== Track listing ==
All tracks are written by Chara, arranged by Chara.

No.	Title	Length
1.	"Family Tree"	4:03
2.	"Issho ni Kurasō (いっしょに暮らそう, Let's Live Together)"	3:18
3.	"Love Me"	3:48
4.	"Tokiyorita"	3:50
5.	"Mirrorball"	4:34
6.	"Ongaku (音楽, Music)"	1:55
7.	"Neverland (ネバーランド)"	3:59
8.	"Kimi Warau Boku Miteru. (君笑う ボクみてる。, You Laugh, I'm Looking.)"	4:00
