= Cocoon (Chara album) =

Studio album by Chara
- Released: October 31, 2012
- Recorded: 2012
- Genres: Alternative pop, electronica, rock, jazz, reggae
- Label: Sony Music Entertainment Japan

Chara chronology
Utakata (2011)	Cocoon (2012)	JEWEL (2013)

Singles from Cocoon
- 1. "Alterna Girlfriend" Released: June 06, 2012; 2. "Planet" Released: August 01, 2012; 3. "Chouchou Musubi" Released: October 17, 2012

Professional ratings
Review scores
Source	Rating
Rolling Stone Japan	3/5 stars

Cocoon (繭, Cocoon) is the 15th (16th overall) studio album by Chara, which was released on October 31, 2012. Cocoon was released in two versions: a limited edition CD+DVD version as well as a regular CD Only version.

The album was preceded by three singles: "Alterna Girlfriend", "Planet" and."Chouchou Musubi". "Planet" was used as the Sony "BRAVIA" commercial song and "Chouchou MusubI" was used as the theme song for the animated movie Fuse: Teppo Musume no Torimonocho.

== Track listing ==
CD
No.	Title	Length
1.	"18"	5:10
2.	"DADAAAN"	3:35
3.	"Alterna Girlfriend (オルタナ・ガールフレンド)"	2:42
4.	"Lita"	3:04
5.	"Kogarashi to Utau (木枯らしと歌う)"	3:23
6.	"Waiting for You"	3:12
7.	"Planet (プラネット)"	3:27
8.	"Chouchou Musubi (蝶々结び; Butterfly Union)"	3:45
9.	"Itoshi Itoshi to Iu Kokoro"	3:52
10.	"Toku ni (特に)"	5:30
11.	"Cocoon"	10:06
12.	"Amaete yo (Bonus Track)(甘えてよ)"	2:22

== Singles ==
Date	Title	Peak position	Weeks	Sales
June 6, 2012	"Alterna Girlfriend"	102 (Oricon)	1	
August 1, 2012	"Planet"	105 (Oricon)	1	
October 17, 2012	"Chouchou Musubi"	87 (Oricon)	2	918

== Japan sales rankings ==
Release	Chart	Peak position	First week sales	Sales total
October 31, 2012	Oricon Daily Albums Chart	10		
October 31, 2012	Oricon Weekly Albums Chart	20	3,902	6,039
