= Breaking Hearts (song) =

Single by Chara

from the album Carol
- Released: July 29, 2009
- Genre: J-pop
- Length: 4:28
- Label: Universal Music
- Songwriter: Chara
- Producer: Swing-O

Chara singles chronology
"'Trophy'" (2008)	"Breaking Hearts" (2009)	"'Kataomoi'" (2009)

Alternative cover
- Limited CD+DVD Cover

"Breaking Hearts" is a song by Chara. It was released as the first from her album Carol on July 29, 2009. It debuted at #28 on the Japanese Oricon album charts, and charted for three weeks.

The single was released in two versions: a limited edition featuring a DVD, plus a regular CD only version. The DVD features the music video for the song.

The B-side of the single, "Mamotte Agetai" (守ってあげたい, I Wanna Protect You), is an acoustic cover of the Yumi Matsutoya song of the same name.

== Music video ==
Chara in the music video.

The music video was shot by director Shūichi Banba (番場秀一). It begins with a red shoe floating in space. The scene changes to Chara singing in a forest. She begins to grow, and sings in places such as a high branch or above the forest, getting increasingly larger. She eventually breaks through the clouds and dances on different planets. She loses her shoes as she jumps from a planet, and disintegrates into hundreds of stars. She wakes up in a hole in the forest, with a boy in clothes far too large for him. The scene pans out, and it is shown that the hole is the heel print from one of her missing shoes.

The video was nominated for Best Female Video for the 2010 Space Shower Music Video Awards.

As of April 20, 2010 the music video for "Breaking Hearts" has been viewed 196,000 times at the two official Universal channels on popular video-sharing website YouTube.

== Track listing ==
=== Single ===
No.	Title	Writer(s)	Arranger	Length
1.	"Breaking Hearts"	Chara	Swing-O	4:28
2.	"Mamotte Agetai (守ってあげたい, I Wanna Protect You)"	Yumi Matsutoya	Chara	5:13
3.	"Breaking Hearts (Instrumental)"	Chara	Swing-O	4:28

== Chart rankings ==
=== Oricon Charts (Japan) ===
Release	Chart	Peak position	First week sales	Sales total	Chart run
July 29, 2009	Oricon Daily Singles Chart	21			
July 29, 2009	Oricon Weekly Singles Chart	28	2,853	3,929	3 weeks
July 29, 2009	Oricon Yearly Singles Chart				

=== Various charts ===
Chart	Peak position
Billboard Japan Hot 100	78
