= Utakata (EP) =

EP by Chara
- Released: November 2, 2011
- Recorded: 2011
- Genre: rock; pop; trip hop; avantgarde

Chara chronology
Dark Candy (2011)	Utakata (2011)	Cocoon (2012)

Utakata is the second EP by Japanese singer Chara, which was released on November 2, 2011. Utakata was released as a regular CD Only version (DDCZ-1781).

This album was Chara's third studio album that wasn't preceded by any singles or promotional tracks, the first being her 2005 effort "something blue" and the second her 2011 "Dark Candy". The style of "Utakata" consists mainly of mellow ballads with influences from trip hop, rock and ambient.

== Track listing ==
CD
No.	Title	Length
1.	"Feeling Feeling"	4:05
2.	"Magic View"	2:55
3.	"Eien wo Shiranaika"	1:58
4.	"Oshiete"	5:20
5.	"Mayonaka no Yakusoku"	4:46
6.	"Wakannai"	4:34
7.	"Aishitaina"	5:05

== Charts ==
Chart (2011)	Peak position
Oricon Weekly Albums Chart	56
