= Happy Toy =

Studio album by Chara
- Released: October 10, 1994
- Recorded: 1994
- Genre: J-pop; Synthpop; Alternative pop
- Length: 48:48
- Label: Epic/Sony Records

Chara chronology
Violet Blue (1993)	Happy Toy (1994)	Chara the Best Baby Baby Baby XXX (1995)

Happy Toy (ハッピー・トイ, Happī Toi) is the fourth studio album by Chara, which was released on October 10, 1994. It debuted at #4 on the Japanese Oricon album charts, and charted in the top 200 for 7 weeks. It eventually sold 145,000 copies.

Two singles were released from the album: Tsumibukaku Aishite yo (罪深く愛してよ, Love Me Guiltily) in May, and Atashi Nande Dakishimetai n darou? (あたしなんで抱きしめたいんだろう?, Why Do I Wanna Hug Him?) in September. Tsumibukaku Aishite yo, despite not having any tie-up like her former popular singles, reached #55 on the singles charts and sold more than these singles. Atashi Nande Dakishimetai n darou? was used in commercials for the Toyota Starlet. This single sold app. 38,000 copies, and has since become one of her signature songs.

== Track listing ==
All lyrics are written by Chara.

No.	Title	Music	Arranger(s)	Length
1.	"Baby Baby"	Chara		2:08
2.	"Atashi Nande Dakishimetai n darou? (あたしなんで抱きしめたいんだろう?, Why Do I Wanna Hug Him?)"	Kohey Tsuchiya	Zentarō Watanabe	4:42
3.	"Iya (いや, Stop Me (Bad))"	Chara, U-Ske Asada	U-Ske Asada	5:28
4.	"Papa to Miteita (パパと見ていた, Scene with Dad (I was Looking with Papa)))"	Chara	David Motion	6:17
5.	"Tsumibukaku Aishite yo (罪深く愛してよ, Love Me Guiltily (Love Me Sinfully))"	Chara, U-Ske Asada	U-Ske Asada	5:09
6.	"Happy Toy"	Chara, Zentarō Watanabe	Zentarō Watanabe	5:03
7.	"Mabataki (まばたき, Blink)"	Chara, U-Ske Asada	U-Ske Asada	6:00
8.	"Bishonure no (びしょぬれの, Can't Return from the Sky (Wet))"	Chara, Mizuho Hirata	U-Ske Asada	4:51
9.	"Yumemiru Fujibitai (夢見る富士額, Dreamin Little With (Dreaming Mount Fuji-Shaped Eyebrows))"	Chara, U-Ske Asada	U-Ske Asada	4:16
10.	"Hikitomerarenai (ひきとめられない, Can't Keep You Mine (Can't Hold You Back))"	Chara	David Motion	4:49

Note: translations are official translations, as written in the album booklet. More accurate translations are listed in brackets.

== Singles ==
Date	Title	Peak position	Weeks	Sales
May 1, 1994	"Tsumibukaku Aishite yo"	55 (Oricon)	3	14,590
September 7, 1994	"Atashi Nande Dakishimetai n darou?"	41 (Oricon)	6	38,310

== Japan Sales Rankings ==
Release	Chart	Peak position	First week sales	Sales total	Chart run
October 10, 1994	Oricon Daily Albums Chart				
October 10, 1994	Oricon Weekly Albums Chart	4	70,040	145,000	7 weeks
October 10, 1994	Oricon Yearly Albums Chart				
