= Strange Fruits =

Studio album by Chara
- Released: March 17, 1999
- Recorded: 1998–1999
- Genre: Trip hop, downtempo, alternative pop
- Length: 46:25
- Label: Sony Music Japan
- Producer: Chara

Chara chronology
Junior Sweet (1997)	Strange Fruits (1999)	Live 97–99 Mood (2000)

Singles from Strange Fruits
- 1. "Duca" Released: July 18, 1998; 2. "Hikari to Watashi" Released: October 21, 1998; 3. "70% (Yūgure no Uta)" Released: February 17, 1999

Strange Fruits (ストレンジ・フルーツ, Sutorenji Furūtsu) is the seventh studio album by Japanese singer Chara, which was released on March 17, 1999. It debuted at #3 on the Japanese Oricon album charts, and charted in the top 200 for 9 weeks.

Chara self-produced this album. Three singles prior to this album's release: "Duca", "Hikari to Watashi" and "70% (Yūgure no Uta)". "Duca" and "Hikari to Watashi" were both released in 1998, while "70% (Yūgure no Uta)" was released a month before the album's release. "Hikari to Watashi" was used as the commercial song for Warner-Lambert Calorio diet pills in 1998. An album track, Atashi wa Koko yo (あたしはここよ, I'm Here), was used in Snow Brand Liebender ice-cream commercials.

== Track listing ==
No.	Title	Lyrics	Music	Arranger(s)	Length
1.	"Atashi wa Koko yo (あたしはここよ, I'm Here)"	Chara	Chara	Towa Tei, Ayumi Obinata	3:32
2.	"Hikari to Watashi (光と私, The Light and Me)"	Chara	Chara, Tomoyuki Ishikawa	Aurora Band	5:45
3.	"Ano Ie ni Kaerō (あの家に帰ろう, Let's Go Back to That House)"	Chara, Tadanobu Asano	Chara	Yukio Nagoshi	4:04
4.	"70% (Yūgure no Uta) (70%—夕暮れのうた, 70% (Evening Song))"	Chara	Chara, Zentarō Watanabe	Zentarō Watanabe	4:11
5.	"Oblate (オブラート)"	Chara, Tadanobu Asano	Chara	Yukio Nagoshi	4:18
6.	"Duca"	Chara	Chara, Shinichi Igarashi	Aurora Band	4:00
7.	"Onna no Ko no Heya (女の子の部屋, Girl's Room)"	Chara	Chara, Yukio Nagoshi, Asa-Chang	Aurora Band	2:45
8.	"Aishiteiru to Seijitsu ni Me ni Katare (あいしていると誠実に目に語れ, Truly Tell Me You Love Me with Your Eyes)"	Chara	Chara	Takeshi Watanabe	3:34
9.	"Hanashite Tōtoi Sono Mirai no Koto o (話して尊いその未来のことを, Talk About That Precious Future)"	Chara	Chara, Tomoyuki Ishikawa	Aurora Band	6:14
10.	"Tsutawatte (つたわって, Walking Along)"	Chara	Chara	Aurora Band	3:57
11.	"Nande Sonna Koto o Saseru no? Boku ni (なんでそんなことをさせるの?僕に, Why Do You Make Me Do Such Things?)"	Chara	Chara	David Motion	3:51

== Singles ==
Date	Title	Peak position	Weeks	Sales
July 18, 1998	"Duca"	25 (Oricon)	5	43,760
October 21, 1998	"Hikari to Watashi"	17 (Oricon)	5	53,630
February 17, 1999	"70% (Yūgure no Uta)"	36 (Oricon)	3	21,630

== Japan Sales Rankings ==
Release	Chart	Peak position	First week sales	Sales total	Chart run
March 17, 1999	Oricon Daily Albums Chart	3			
March 17, 1999	Oricon Weekly Albums Chart	3	164,010	317,310	9 weeks
March 17, 1999	Oricon Yearly Albums Chart	74			
