= Violet Blue (album) =

Studio album by Chara
- Released: September 9, 1993
- Recorded: 1993
- Length: 49:11
- Label: Epic/Sony Records

Chara chronology
Soul Kiss (1992)	Violet Blue (1993)	Happy Toy (1994)

Violet Blue (ヴァイオレット・ブルー, Baioretto Burū) is the third studio album by Japanese singer Chara, which was released on September 9, 1993. It debuted at #4 on the Japanese Oricon album charts, and charted in the top 200 for 8 weeks. It eventually sold 123,000 copies.

After the comparative success of her last album, Soul Kiss, Chara rose in popularity. Her first single from the album, Mujintō ni Watashi o Motte Itte... (無人島に私をもっていって・・・, Take Me to a Deserted Island...), was used in a Shiseido 'PJ Lapis' commercial campaign. It reached #66 on the singles chart: her first solo charting single.

Charlotte no Okurimono/Private Beach (シャーロットの贈り物, Charlotte's Web), her next single, was her first double A-side single. Both songs featured commercial tie-ups (Marui Gift Campaign CMs and Snow Brand "Icecream Vintage" CMs respectively). "Charlotte no Okurimono" literally means Charlotte's Present, however this was the Japanese localisation's title of the famous 1952 children's book Charlotte's Web.

Two more singles were released from the album: Koi o Shita (恋をした, I'm in Love) and Gifted Child. Despite Koi o Shita being released on the same day as the album and featuring no new songs, it managed to reach #87. However, Gifted Child, released approximately three months after the album's release, did not chart at all.

The album was recorded in France, and the pictures in the album's booklet/the album cover were shot in Paris.

== Track listing ==
All lyrics are written by Chara.

No.	Title	Music	Arranger(s)	Length
1.	"Koi o Shita (恋をした, I'm in Love)"	Chara, Peter Lorimer	Peter Lorimer	5:11
2.	"Violet Blue"	Chara	U-Ske Asada	6:08
3.	"Gifted Child"	Chara	David Motion	4:42
4.	"Private Beach"	Chara	U-Ske Asada	5:46
5.	"Mujintō ni Watashi o Motte Itte... (無人島に私をもっていって・・・, Take Me to a Deserted Island...)"	Chara, U-Ske Asada	U-Ske Asada	4:50
6.	"19 Lover"	Chara	U-Ske Asada	4:16
7.	"Charlotte no Okurimono (シャーロットの贈り物, Charlotte's Web)"	Chara, U-Ske Asada	U-Ske Asada	4:27
8.	"Ice Cream"	Chara, U-Ske Asada	U-Ske Asada	4:48
9.	"Anata to (あなたと, When I'm with You)"	Chara, U-Ske Asada	Peter Lorimer	3:59
10.	"Aoi Tori (青い鳥, L'oiseau Bleu (Blue Bird))"	Chara, U-Ske Asada	U-Ske Asada	4:59

== Singles ==
Date	Title	Peak position	Weeks	Sales
March 21, 1993	"Mujintō ni Watashi o Motte Itte..."	66 (Oricon)	3	14,340
May 21, 1993	"Charlotte no Okurimono/Private Beach"	70 (Oricon)	2	10,490
September 9, 1993	"Koi o Shita"	87 (Oricon)	2	6,630
November 21, 1993	"Gifted Child"	—	—	—

== Japan Sales Rankings ==
Release	Chart	Peak position	First week sales	Sales total	Chart run
September 9, 1993	Oricon Daily Albums Chart				
September 9, 1993	Oricon Weekly Albums Chart	4	43,820	123,000	8 weeks
September 9, 1993	Oricon Yearly Albums Chart				
