= Sekai (song) =

Single by Chara

from the album Union
- Released: September 13, 2006
- Genre: J-pop
- Length: 3:11
- Label: Universal Music
- Songwriter: Chara
- Producers: Chara, Tatsuki Hashimoto

Chara singles chronology
"'Sapphire no Hoshi'" (2006)	"Sekai" (2006)	"'Crazy for You'" (2006)

Sekai (世界, World) is a song by Chara. It was released as the first single from her album Union on September 13, 2006. It debuted at #24 on the Japanese Oricon album charts, and charted for five weeks. The song was used in commercials for the NEC brand 'Foma N702iS' cellphone.

Chara wrote the song in 2005. The main guitar chords in the song were recycled from the song Ongaku (音楽, Music) from her 2005 independently released album Something Blue.

She wrote "Amai Tori" (甘い鳥, Sweet Bird) in the style of Stevie Nicks. The B-side "Anata" (あなた, You) is a cover of Akiko Kosaka's 1973 debut single.

== Music video ==
Chara in the music video.

The music video was shot by director Kenjiro Harigai (針谷建二郎). It begins with an animated/CGI image of an egg that cracks becomes a bird. This bird flies off past several doors, and enters one into a space scene. The scene switches to Chara in an almost completely white room with a white dress. She wears her hair half-straight and half in an afro (with the division being vertically down the centre of her head). The scene switches to a drawing a Chara falling through a dark, psychedelic scene, followed by a white-backed scene depicting different drawings. Chara returns to the white room, however with a different hair-style and now drawn animals floating around her. Occasionally the originally dressed Chara appears behind her. The video ends with more psychedelic scenes and the bird flying away into space/clouds.

== Track listing ==
=== Single ===
No.	Title	Writer(s)	Arranger	Length
1.	"Sekai (世界, World)"	Chara	Chara, Tatsuki Hashimoto	3:23
2.	"Amai Tori (甘い鳥, Sweet Bird)"	Chara	Chara, Tatsuki Hashimoto	3:09
3.	"Anata (あなた, You)"	Akiko Kosaka	Swing-O	5:31
Total length:				12:13

== Chart Rankings ==
=== Oricon Charts (Japan) ===
Release	Chart	Peak position	First week sales	Sales total	Chart run
September 13, 2006	Oricon Daily Singles Chart	15			
September 13, 2006	Oricon Weekly Singles Chart	24	4,838	9,607	5 weeks
September 13, 2006	Oricon Yearly Singles Chart				
