= Dark Candy =

Studio album by Chara
- Released: April 13, 2011
- Recorded: 2011
- Genres: R&B, urban, electronica, pop, ambient, reggae, rock
- Label: Universal Music Japan

Chara chronology
Carol (2009)	Dark Candy (2011)	Utakata (2011)

Dark Candy is the 14th studio album by Chara, which was released on April 13, 2011. Dark Candy was released in two versions: a limited edition CD+DVD version (UMCK-9417) as well as a regular CD Only version (UMCK-1382).

This album was Chara's second studio album that wasn't preceded by any singles or promotional tracks, the first being her 2005 effort "something blue". A music video for the song "Rachel" was released the day before the album's release. The style of "Dark Candy" is mainly urban with influences from many genres such as electronica, rock, reggae, jazz and ambient.

== Track listing ==
CD
No.	Title	Length
1.	"Countdown"	5:26
2.	"Yura Shitagaru"	4:02
3.	"Eien No Uta"	4:42
4.	"Toy Soldier"	3:37
5.	"Little bird"	5:09
6.	"Koko ni Ite"	5:22
7.	"Rachael"	3:12
8.	"Naive to Innocence"	8:14
9.	"Dark Candy"	3:50
10.	"Sainou no Jyou"	4:12

== Japan sales rankings ==
Release	Chart	Peak position	First week sales	Sales total
April 13, 2011	Oricon Weekly Albums Chart	27	3,666	5,210
