= Yoake Mae =

Studio album by Chara
- Released: March 19, 2003
- Recorded: 2002–2003
- Genre: Downtempo, ambient pop, alternative pop
- Length: 59:51
- Label: Sony Music Japan
- Producer: Chara

Chara chronology
Madrigal (2001)	Yoake Mae (2003)	A Scenery Like Me (2004)

Singles from Yoake Mae
- 1. "Hatsukoi" Released: October 9, 2002; 2. "Mieru wa" Released: February 8, 2003

Yoake Mae (夜明けまえ, Before the Dawn) is the ninth studio album by Chara, which was released on March 19, 2003. It debuted at #17 on the Japanese Oricon album charts, and charted in the top 300 for 5 weeks. It eventually sold 47,000 copies.

The entire album was produced and written by Chara. It was her last original album release on Sony.

Two singles were released from the album: Hatsukoi (初恋, First Love) and Mieru wa (みえるわ, I Can See!).

== Track listing ==
All tracks are written by Chara, unless otherwise noted.

No.	Title	Music	Length
1.	"Beautiful Day"		4:14
2.	"Mieru wa (みえるわ, I Can See!)"		5:01
3.	"Sweetie (スウィーティー)"		4:07
4.	"Hatsukoi (初恋, First Love)"		4:41
5.	"Shinpi no Ie (神秘の家, House of Mystery)"		3:24
6.	"Utsukushii Machi (うつくしい街, Beautiful Town)"		3:24
7.	"Heart ni Hi o Tsukete (ハートの火をつけて, A Fire Burns in My Heart)"		5:10
8.	"Hello (ハロー)"		6:17
9.	"Ocean (オーシャン)"		4:27
10.	"Kokoro ni Konai (心にこない, Doesn't Come to My Heart)"		5:37
11.	"Beautiful Scarlet"		4:56
12.	"I Wanna Freely Love You"	Chara, Toru Yamazaki	7:49

== Singles ==
Date	Title	Peak position	Weeks	Sales
October 9, 2002	"Hatsukoi"	16 (Oricon)	3	12,410
February 8, 2003	"Mieru wa"	71 (Oricon)	2	2,844

== Japan sales rankings ==
Release	Chart	Peak position	First week sales	Sales total
March 19, 2003	Oricon Weekly Albums Chart	17	19,742	46,812
March 19, 2003	Soundscan Album Top 20	17	22,382	
