= Montage (Yen Town Band album) =

Studio album by Yen Town Band (Chara)
- Released: September 16, 1996
- Recorded: 1996
- Length: 35:44
- Label: Sony Music Japan
- Producer: Takeshi Kobayashi

Yen Town Band (Chara) chronology
Chara the Best Baby Baby Baby XXX (1995)	Montage (1996)	Junior Sweet (1997)

Alternative Covers
- Slipcase Cover

Singles from Montage
- 1. "Swallowtail Butterfly (Ai no Uta)" Released: July 22, 1996

Montage (モンタージュ, Montāju) is the concept album by Yen Town Band, fictional music group from the 1996 motion picture Swallowtail directed by Shunji Iwai. The album was actually recorded by a Japanese singer-songwriter Chara who played the starring role in the film. It was released by the Sony Music Entertainment Japan in September 1996.

== Background ==
Yen Town Band is the name of the band featured in the film. Glico, the character Chara plays, is the main vocalist of the band, made up of residents from the Shanghai section of the Yentown slum. The concept album was a collaboration between Chara and the producer Takeshi Kobayashi. Kobayashi elaborated a Beatlesque sound on the whole album.

== Reception ==
The theme song for the movie, "Swallowtail Butterfly (Ai no Uta) (あいのうた)", was released in July 1996, two months prior to the film's release. It was a slow hit, selling over 70,000 copies between July and August. In September, when major promotion for the film began, the single finally broke the top 20 (at #18).

The album was released simultaneously with the film in mid September. It debuted at number-one the Oricon charts for 2 weeks (selling 227,400 and 127,290 units in each respective week), becoming the performer's first chart-topping hit. The album eventually spent 18 weeks on the top 100, with cumulative sales of 785,000 units just in Japan.

"Mama's Alright" was featured as a B-side of the "Swallowtail Butterfly (Ai no Uta)" single, and the track "Shite yo Shite yo (してよ してよ)" was featured in Sprite commercials that starred Chara herself. The closing track My Way is a standard cover of the English version originally recorded by Frank Sinatra.

== Track listing ==
All songs arranged and produced by Takeshi Kobayashi

No.	Title	Lyrics	Music	Length
1.	"Sunday Park"	Fumiko Yoshii	Takeshi Kobayashi	4:17
2.	"Mama's Alright"	Kobayashi, Takayo Nagasawa, Bryan Burton-Lewis	Kobayashi	4:11
3.	"She Don't Care"	Burton-Lewis	Chara	4:41
4.	"Swallowtail Butterfly (Ai no Uta) (あいのうた, Love Song)"	Shunji Iwai, Kobayashi, Chara	Takeshi Kobayashi	4:49
5.	"Shanghai Baby (上海ベイベ)"	Chara	Chara	4:59
6.	"Shite yo Shite yo (してよしてよ)"	Chara	Yukio Nagoshi, Chara, Kobayashi	4:02
7.	"Chiisana Tenohira (小さな手のひら, Little Palms)"	Chara	Chara	3:11
8.	"My Way"	Gilles Thibaut, Paul Anka (English lyrics)	Jacques Revaux, Claude François	5:34
Total length:				35:44

== Singles ==
Date	Title	Peak position	Weeks	Sales
July 22, 1996	"Swallowtail Butterfly (Ai no Uta)"	1 (Oricon)	25	878,150

== Charts ==
=== Weekly charts ===
Chart (1996)	Position
Japanese Oricon Albums Chart	1

=== Year-end charts ===
Chart (1996)	Position
Japanese Albums Chart	31

== Certifications ==
Region	Certification	Certified units/sales
Japan (RIAJ)	2× Platinum	785,000
