= Ai no Hi Mittsu Orange =

Single by Chara and Yuki
- Released: November 26, 1999
- Genre: J-pop
- Length: 4:51
- Label: Sony Music Japan
- Songwriters: Chara; Yuki
- Producer: U-Ske Asada

Chara singles chronology
"Let Me Know" (1999)	"Ai no Hi Mittsu Orange" (1999)	"Tsuki to Amai Namida" (2000)

Yuki singles chronology
"Ai no Hi Mittsu Orange" (1999)	"The End of Shite" (2002)

Ai no Hi Mittsu Orange (愛の火 3つ オレンジ, Fire of Love, Three, Orange) is a special collaboration song between solo artist Chara and Judy and Mary vocalist Yuki. The song was used in a Sapporo Beer commercial for their Fuyu Monogatari (冬物語, Winter Story) campaign.

The song was released as Chara's first single after her maternity leave for her second child, Himi (緋美), and while Yuki was taking a break from Judy and Mary activities (and participating in the band NiNa).

The song's title is a pun: Ai no Hi Mittsu (愛の火 3つ, Fire of Love, Three) sounds like Ai no Himitsu (愛の秘密, Secret of Love).

The song debuted at #6 on Oricon charts and charted for seven weeks, eventually selling approximately 230,000 copies.

== Music video ==
Chara and Yuki in the music video.

The music video was shot by directorial pair Blaine & Justin. It begins in space, showing a moon superimposed with people on it. A blue man holds up a crescent-shaped hoop to the moon. The majority of the video is based around clips of Chara and Yuki are in red, glittery outfits, along with scenes of four blue dancers covered in lights.

== Track listing ==
=== Single ===
No.	Title	Writer(s)	Arranger	Length
1.	"Ai no Hi Mittsu Orange (愛の火 3つ オレンジ, Fire of Love, Three, Orange)"	Chara, Yuki	U-Ske Asada	4:51
2.	"Ai no Hi Mittsu Orange (Re-Mix) (愛の火 3つ オレンジ, Fire of Love, Three, Orange)"	Chara, Yuki	U-Ske Asada	4:50
3.	"Ai no Hi Mittsu Orange (Instrumental) (愛の火 3つ オレンジ, Fire of Love, Three, Orange)"	Chara, Yuki	U-Ske Asada	4:51

== Chart Rankings ==
=== Oricon Charts (Japan) ===
Release	Chart	Peak position	First week sales	Sales total	Chart run
November 26, 1999	Oricon Daily Singles Chart				
November 26, 1999	Oricon Weekly Singles Chart	6	95,170	229,880	7 weeks
November 26, 1999	Oricon Yearly Singles Chart				

=== Various charts ===
Chart	Peak position
CDTV Top 100	6
