= Marui =

Japanese retailer

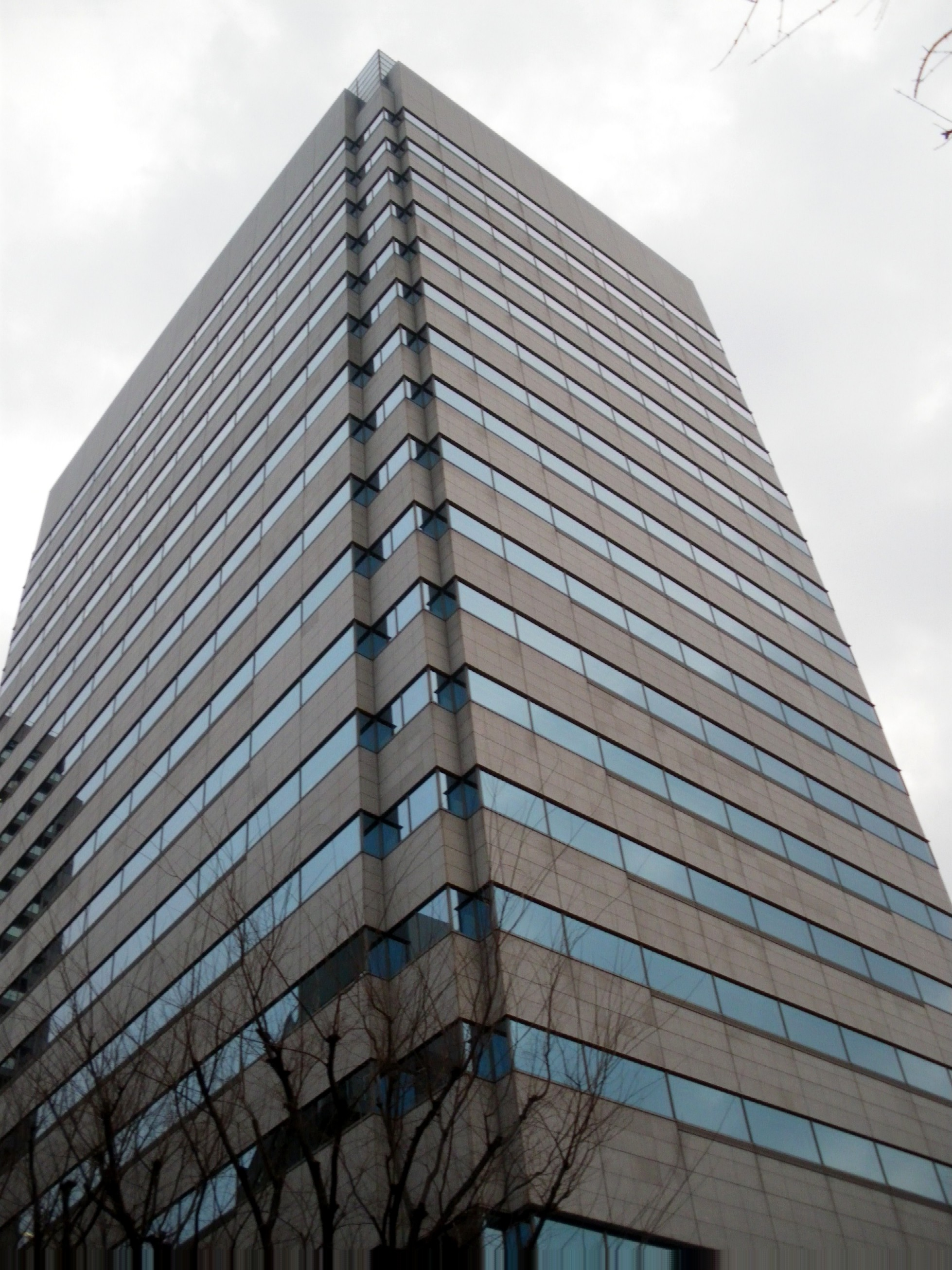
- Marui headquarters, Nakano, Tokyo
- Type: Public KK
- Traded as: TYO: 8252
- Industry: Department stores
- Founded: October 1, 2007; 18 years ago
- Founder: Chūji Aoi (青井忠治)
- Headquarters: Nakano, Tokyo, Japan
- Area served: Worldwide
- Products: Women's fashion and accessories
- Owner: The Master Trust Bank of Japan (13.1%); Japan Trustee Services Bank (7.5%); Goldman Sachs (2.7%); Toho (1.68%); Toda Construction (0.81%)
- Website: Marui

Marui Co., Ltd. (株式会社丸井, Kabushiki-gaisha Marui) is a Japanese multinational retail company which operates a chain of department stores in Tokyo as well in other major Japanese cities. They are best known for their women's fashion and accessories, which are aimed at the 25–35 age range.

In 2003–4 the company generated US$2.75 billion in revenues. Its president is Hiroshi Aoi.

== Name and logo ==
The company's name (丸井) is a combination of the name of its predecessor's parent company "Maru-ni" (丸二) and the name of its president "Ao-i" (青井). The name of the department store is customarily written in Japanese as "マルイ", in katakana.

The department store's famously ambiguous present-day logo is a symbol resembling "○I○I", and read "marui". The Japanese symbol "○" (not to be confused with the Latin letter "O" or "o") is read "maru", meaning "circle" or "zero". The symbol "I" ostensibly represents the numeral "1", which can be read "i" in Japanese (note that the Latin letter "I" is also the romanized representation of the Japanese hiragana "い", a third visual pun).

Despite being read as numerals, the symbol is written "OIOI" in Latin letters on the company's website, though the address of the website itself is "www.0101.co.jp". The "○I" in the logo is repeated, partly for aesthetics and also as an inference to the "0101" ending of the phone number of all Marui department stores.

== MARUIONE.JP ==
In December 2007, Marui Co., Ltd. launched an international shopping and information website, maruione.jp. The site operates in Japanese, simplified and traditional Chinese, Korean, English, and French. The shopping site offers Japanese street fashion and traditional goods while their LiveJ information site provides information on fashion, culture and visual kei music.
