= Bloodthirsty Butchers =

Japanese rock band

- Origin: Sapporo, Japan
- Genres: Indie rock, post-hardcore, alternative rock, noise rock, emotional hardcore
- Years active: 1986–2013
- Labels: King, Toshiba EMI, Triad, Toy's Factory, Tower Records, 391tone, Bacteria Sour, TeenBeat
- Members: Hideki Yoshimura; Masahiro Komatsu; Takeshi Imoriya; Hisako Tabuchi
- Website: http://www.bloodthirsty-butchers.com/

Bloodthirsty Butchers was a long-running indie rock and punk rock band from Sapporo, Hokkaidō, Japan. Although little-known in the West, they have contributed to two compilations on the Olympia, Washington based Yoyo label. The band has also released a split single with Rocket from the Crypt and a split EP with +/-. Japanese act Lost in Time named their band after a song from band's third album Lukewarm Wind. The long-term members are Hideki Yoshimura (vocals and guitar), Masahiro Komatsu (drums), and Takeshi Imoriya (bass). Former Number Girl member Hisako Tabuchi joined as an additional guitarist in 2003.

Frontman Hideki Yoshimura also played guitar for other Japanese indie acts such as Copass Grinderz and Discharming Man.

On May 27, 2013, Hideki Yoshimura suddenly died of acute cardiac failure. He was 46. The band cancelled all the tour dates planned.

== Members ==
=== Current members ===
- Hideki Yoshimura (吉村 秀樹, Yoshimura Hideki) (born 20 January 1967, died 27 May 2013) - vocals, guitar (1986–2013)
- Takeshi Imoriya (射守矢 雄, Imoriya Takeshi) (born 31 March 1967) - bass (1986–2013)
- Masahiro Komatsu (小松 正宏, Komatsu Masahiro) (born 7 May 1970) - drums (1989–2013)
- Hisako Tabuchi (田渕 ひさ子, Tabuchi Hisako) (born 9 December 1975) - guitar (2003–2013)

=== Former members ===
- Kiyomi Sano (佐野 紀代己, Sano Kiyomi) - drums (1986–1989)

== Discography ==
=== Albums ===
- Bloodthirsty Butchers 1st Cassette Tape (Bloodthirsty Butchers 1stカセットテープ) (1988)
- Bloodthirsty Butchers 2nd Cassette Tape (Bloodthirsty Butchers 2ndカセットテープ) (1989)
- Bloodthirsty Butchers (1990)
- I'm Standing Nowhere (1993)
- Lukewarm Wind (1994)
- Kocorono (1996)
- 「△」Sankaku (1999)
- Mikansei (未完成) (1999)
- Yamane (2001)
- Kōya ni Okeru Bloodthirsty Butchers (荒野ニオケルBloodthirsty Butchers) (2003)
- Green on Red (2003) (live album)
- Birdy (2004)
- Banging the Drum (2005)
- Guitarist wo Korosanaide (ギタリストを殺さないで, Gitarisuto wo Korosanaide, Don't Kill That Guitarist) (2007)
- No Album Mudai (No Album 無題) (2010)
- Youth (Seishun) (Youth (青春)) (2013)

=== Singles ===
- "Karasu" (1991)
- "Room" (1993)
- "Faust" (ファウスト, Fausuto) with Tadanobu Asano (1999)
- "Driwing" with El-Malo (1999)
- "「△」Sankaku" (「△」サンカク) (1999)
- "Nagisanite" (2001)
- "Happy End" / "Jigoku no Rocker" (地獄のロッカー, Jigoku no Rokkā) (2001)

=== Compilations ===
- Bloodthirsty Butchers (1996) (US release)
- Blue on Red (2003)
- Chi ni Ueta Shihan Seiki (血に飢えた四半世紀) (2012) (box set containing 12 CDs & 1 DVD)

=== Splits ===
- Bloodthirsty Butchers & Copass Grinderz (1994)
- Rocket from the Crypt & Bloodthirsty Butchers (1994)
- Bloodthirsty Butchers vs fOUL (1998)
- Bloodthirsty Butchers vs +/- {Plus/Minus} (2005)

=== Video ===
- Kocorono (2011) (documentary directed by Jun Kawaguchi)
