= Chara (singer) =

Japanese singer-songwriter and actress (born 1968)

- ちゃら
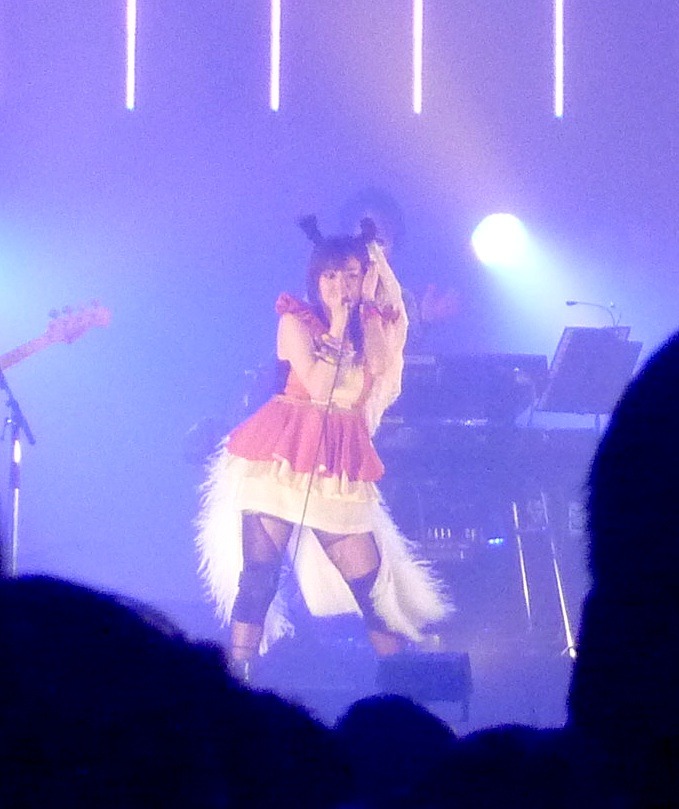
- Chara performing live, 2011
- Born: Miwa Watabiki; January 13, 1968 (age 57); Kawaguchi, Japan
- Occupations: Singer; actress; television presenter; record producer
- Years active: 1990–present
- Spouse: Tadanobu Asano (m. 1995; div. 2009)
- Children: 2
- Musical career
- Genres: J-Pop; alternative rock; trip hop; electronic; jazz; reggae fusion; downtempo; funk; synth-pop
- Instruments: Vocals; piano
- Labels: Epic/SMEJ (1990–2004); A&M/Universal Music Japan (2006–2011); Happy Toy/BounDEE Inc. (2011–2012); Ki/oon/SMEJ (2012–2018); Universal Sigma/Universal Music Japan (2018–2021); Nippon Columbia (2022–present)
- Website: charaweb.net

Miwa Watabiki (綿引 美和, Watabiki Miwa; born January 13, 1968), better known by her stage name Chara (ちゃら), is a Japanese singer, actress and video jockey. She debuted in 1991 with the single Heaven. She is known for her song "Swallowtail Butterfly (Ai no Uta)", the theme song for the 1996 Shunji Iwai film Swallowtail Butterfly in which she starred, her 1997 hit single "Yasashii Kimochi", and her collaboration with Judy and Mary vocalist Yuki, "Ai no Hi Mittsu Orange". Chara later formed a band with Yuki, called Mean Machine.

== Early life ==
Chara grew up in Kawaguchi, Saitama. She started learning the piano from age four, and starting composing songs in elementary school. In her first year of elementary school, she performed a song she had written, "Sayonara" (サヨナラ, Goodbye), at a school piano recital.

She originally received her nickname Chara in junior high school, after a teacher called her this. She was so well known by this name that even some of her friends did not know her real name. She continues to use this name as she believes it brings out her inner child. After finishing high school, Chara went to Tokyo to a vocational school, majoring in music and specialising in piano. However, she dropped out one year into her two-year degree.

From 1984 onward, she worked as a keyboardist in several different unsigned bands. During this time, she found part-time work as a roller-skating waitress. In 1988, to get a chance to sing her own compositions, she decided to become a band vocalist instead. Her first live performance was at the Shinjuku Ruido live house in 1990.

== Career ==
=== 1991–1995: Early releases ===
Chara sent a demo tape to Sony Music in 1990, which caught the attention of Masahiro Ohara and landed her a deal with Epic Records Japan She recorded her debut album in early 1991 in Tokyo and London, and debuted in September with a performance at the Shibuya Club Quattro and the release of her debut single Heaven. In October, Chara became a personality on the ANN music show Video Jam, and later in November released her debut album Sweet. The album was not very successful, only reaching No. 64 on Oricon's album charts.

Chara's career gained more momentum after her first tour, Chara Live "Sweet" in May 1992. She became a radio personality for the FM Yokohama, with her own radio show Yokohama Chara Machi 8-4-7 (横浜チャラ町8-4-7), and her second album, Soul Kiss, won the 1992 Japan Record Award for best rock/pop album from a new artist. The album reached No. 14 on the album charts.

In 1993, she starred in many different commercials (or had her songs featured in them), including commercials for Suntory, Shiseido, Marui and Snow Brand ice creams. Her single "Mujintō ni Watashi o Motte Itte..." (無人島に私をもっていって・・・, Take Me to a Deserted Island...), the song used in the Shiseido campaign, was her first top 100 charting single, reaching No. 66. The resulting album, Violet Blue, debuted at No. 4 on the charts. Her 1994 album, Happy Toy, riding on the success of her first top 50 single "Atashi Nande Dakishimetain darou?" (あたしなんで抱きしめたいんだろう?, Why Do I Wanna Hug Him?), also debuting at No. 4.

In spring 1994, she filmed the Shunji Iwai film Picnic, in which she played a mental patient. The film would not be released for another two years. She starred aside Tadanobu Asano, whom she married in 1995. Chara took a short break from music, releasing Chara the Best Baby Baby Baby XXX and giving birth to her first child, a girl named Sumire (菫).Sumire means violet.

=== 1996–2001: Mainstream success ===
In February 1996, Chara began filming her second film for Iwai, titled Swallowtail Butterfly. She played Glico (グリコ), a slum prostitute with musical aspirations. Chara recorded the soundtrack for the movie, collaborating with Mr. Children music producer Takeshi Kobayashi to create a Beatles-esque sound. The music was released under the name Yen Town Band, the name of the band Glico forms in the film.

Before the movie's release, the theme song "Swallowtail Butterfly (Ai no Uta)" was released, along with Chara's first film with Iwai, Picnic, finding a proper cinema release. The film was a massive hit, propelling Chara to stardom. Both the concept album, Montage, and the theme song reached No. 1 on Oricon charts. Her performance awarded her a Japan Academy Prize for Outstanding Performance by an Actress in a Leading Role nomination. The film won the Most Popular Film award.

Chara's fame soared, as shown by her next album Junior Sweet. The main single from the album, "Yasashii Kimochi" (the Shiseido 'Tessera J' CM song), was a big hit, selling over 520,000 copies and became her second biggest hit after Swallowtail Butterfly (Ai no Uta). The album was certified by the RIAJ as selling over 1,000,000 copies.

Her 1999 album, Strange Fruits, saw some success, debuting at No. 3 and selling over 300,000 copies. Chara teamed up with Judy and Mary vocalist Yuki to release a special single called "Ai no Hi Mittsu Orange". This song is Chara's third biggest hit, selling over 230,000 copies.

In 2000, Chara released her second best-of collection, Caramel Milk: The Best of Chara, and 2001 released her 8th album, Madrigal. Madrigal featured two tracks co-written with American guitarist James Iha.

=== 2001–2005: Mean Machine ===
In late 2001, Chara released music as the drummer of the twin-drum all-girl rock band, Mean Machine, alongside Yuki, Swallowtail actress Ayumi Ito, 1980s musician Mayumi Chiwaki and former funk/rock band Jagatara dancer Yukarie. The band was conceived in 1998, when Chiwaki mentioned to Chara that she thought it would be good to start up a girls' rock band. One of the tenets of the band was that all members would have to do something they'd never tried before, landing Chara on drums. The band first practiced in 1999, and continued to sporadically practice throughout 2000, despite different members' schedules.

In 2001, the band debuted with the song "Sūhā" (スーハー), which was written by Chara during her second pregnancy, inspired by the breathing sounds of the Lamaze technique. Soon after, the band released their debut album Cream.

In 2003, Chara released her 9th solo album, Yoake Mae, and in 2004 released an album of re-recordings of songs from her early albums, A Scenery Like Me. This heralded the end of Chara's Sony contract. Chara self-released her music after this point, recording songs from her own home and self-producing her work. These recordings resulted in a limited 2,000 copy album, Something Blue, and a digital single Hikari no Niwa (光の庭, Garden of Light) (used as the theme song for the Japanese release of the movie March of the Penguins).

During this period, Chara created several bands. One, Cold Sugar was a collaboration with Arai Akino.

=== 2006–present ===
Chara re-debuted as a major label artist in 2006, with the release of the single "Sekai". Her single "Fantasy" was a minor hit, reaching No. 13 on Oricon charts. It was written in collaboration with Seiji Kameda, producer for artists such as Do As Infinity and bassist for the band Tokyo Jihen. The following album, Union, also fared well. It reached the top 5 in Oricon's album charts, and outsold her former two Sony released albums. On the back of Chara's returned success, Sony released the compilation album, Sugar Hunter: The Best Love Songs of Chara.

Chara's Universal singles have fared better on digital charts. "Trophy", a single from Chara's second Universal album Honey, did well digitally, despite the physical release only reaching No. 37.

After the end of her contract with Universal, Chara released a new mini-album, Utakata, in November 2011 under BounDEE Inc. (a subsidiary of Space Shower Networks, the owners of Space Shower TV). Utakata charted at 56th spot on the Oricon charts and lasted there for three weeks.

On December 14, 2011, Chara announced in a concert at Shibuya-AX her transfer to Ki/oon Records (now Ki/oon Music), an imprint of Sony Music Japan. She joined Ki/oon's 20th anniversary concert tour, "Ki/oon 20 Years and Days", in April 2012 at Liquidroom Ebisu, Tokyo. She released her first single through Ki/oon, "Alterna Girlfriend", on June 6, 2012.

Chara collaborated with Basement Jaxx for the song "Wherever You Go" on the album Junto in 2014.

== Personal life ==
In 1994, Chara married actor Tadanobu Asano. She met Asano on the set of the 1994 film Picnic, in which they were both starring actors. Chara gave birth to a daughter, Sumire (菫), on July 4, 1995. Chara also had a son Himi (緋美) with Asano on December 19, 1999. The couple attended the 80th Academy Awards in Los Angeles in 2008, as the film Mongol, in which Asano starred, was nominated for the best foreign film category as the submission from Kazakhstan. On July 25, 2009, Chara announced her amicable divorce from Asano, after 14 years of marriage. Chara has two tattoos: a blue bird on her back, and a sumire flower (菫, Fuji Dawn Viola) on her neck. Chara's children feature in her music. Sumire features on the cover of her album Honey, which also has a track named after her.

== Discography ==
- Sweet (1991)
- Soul Kiss (1992)
- Violet Blue (1993)
- Happy Toy (1994)
- Montage (1996)
- Junior Sweet (1997)
- Strange Fruits (1999)
- Madrigal (2001)
- Yoake Mae (2003)
- A Scenery Like Me (2004)
- Something Blue (2005)
- Union (2007)
- Honey (2008)
- Carol (2009)
- Dark Candy (2011)
- Cocoon (2012)
- Jewel (2013)
- Secret Garden (2015)
- Diverse Journey (2016)
- Sympathy (2017)
- Baby Bump (2018)

== Filmography ==
=== Films ===
Year	Title	Role	Other notes
1996	Picnic	Coco (ココ)	Filmed in 1994; Won – Yokohama Film Festival Best New Talent
1996	Swallowtail Butterfly	Glico (グリコ)	Won – Yokohama Film Festival Best New Talent; Nominated — Japan Academy Prize for Outstanding Performance by an Actress in a Leading Role

=== Series ===
Year	Title	Role	Other notes
2022	Because We Forget Everything		

=== TV music shows ===
Year	Title	Role	Other notes
1991	Video Jam	Co-presenter	1991–?
2008	Ongaku Bāka (音楽ば～か)	Co-presenter	2008–present
