= Soul Kiss (Chara album) =

Studio album by Chara
- Released: September 1, 1992
- Recorded: 1992
- Genre: J-pop; R&B; Synthpop; Alternative pop
- Length: 54:34
- Label: Sony Music Japan

Chara chronology
Sweet (1991)	Soul Kiss (1992)	Violet Blue (1993)

Singles from Soul Kiss
- 1. "Ōki na Jishin ga Kitatte" Released: July 1, 1992; 2. "Ai no Jibaku Sōchi" Released: November 1, 1992

Soul Kiss (ソウル・キス, Sōru Kisu) is the second studio album by Chara, which was released on September 1, 1992. It debuted at #14 on the Japanese Oricon album charts, and charted in the top 200 for seven weeks. It eventually sold 65,000 copies.

It was preceded by the single debut single Ōki na Jishin ga Kitatte (大きな地震がきたって, Even If There's a Great Earthquake) in July. A re-cut single, Ai no Jibaku Sōchi (愛の自爆装置, Love Suicide Bombing Gear), was released two months after the album's release date. It featured rock musician Rolly Teranishi in background vocals. Neither of these singles charted in the Oricon top 100 singles.

In December 1992, Soul Kiss received a Japan Record Award for best rock/pop album from a new artist. In October 1993, the album was awarded the first Ryoichi Hattori Music Festival Album of Excellence Award, created in memory of Hattori, who died in January of that year.

== Track listing ==
All lyrics are written by Chara.

CD
No.	Title	Music	Arranger(s)	Length
1.	"Soul Kiss (Prologue)"	Chara	U-Ske Asada	1:57
2.	"Ano Tokei no Shita de (あの時計の下で, Under That Clock)"	Chara, Charles Pierre	Charles Pierre	4:24
3.	"Ōki na Jishin ga Kitatte (大きな地震がきたって, Even If There's a Great Earthquake)"	Chara	U-Ske Asada	5:06
4.	"Are wa ne (あれはね, Is That Right)"	Chara	David Motion	5:36
5.	"No Promise"	Chara, Mizuho Hirata	U-Ske Asada	5:18
6.	"Naze Waratteru no kana? (なぜ笑ってるのかな?, I Wonder Why You're Laughing)"	Chara, U-Ske Asada	U-Ske Asada	5:26
7.	"Ai no Jibaku Sōchi (愛の自爆装置, Love Suicide Bombing Gear)"	Chara, U-Ske Asada	U-Ske Asada	4:36
8.	"Soul Kiss xxx"	Chara	U-Ske Asada	5:20
9.	"Pain"	Chara, U-Ske Asada	U-Ske Asada	5:31
10.	"Migite o Watashi no Migite no Ue ni Kasanete (右手を私の右手の上に重ねて, You Put Your Right Hand on Top of Mine)"	Chara	U-Ske Asada	5:33
11.	"Time After Time"	Chara	David Motion	4:59

== Japan Sales Rankings ==
Release	Chart	Peak position	First week sales	Sales total	Chart run
September 1, 1992	Oricon Daily Albums Chart				
September 1, 1992	Oricon Weekly Albums Chart	14	18,900	65,000	7 weeks
September 1, 1992	Oricon Yearly Albums Chart				
