= Megmilk Snow Brand =

Japanese dairy company

Megmilk Snow Brand Co., Ltd.

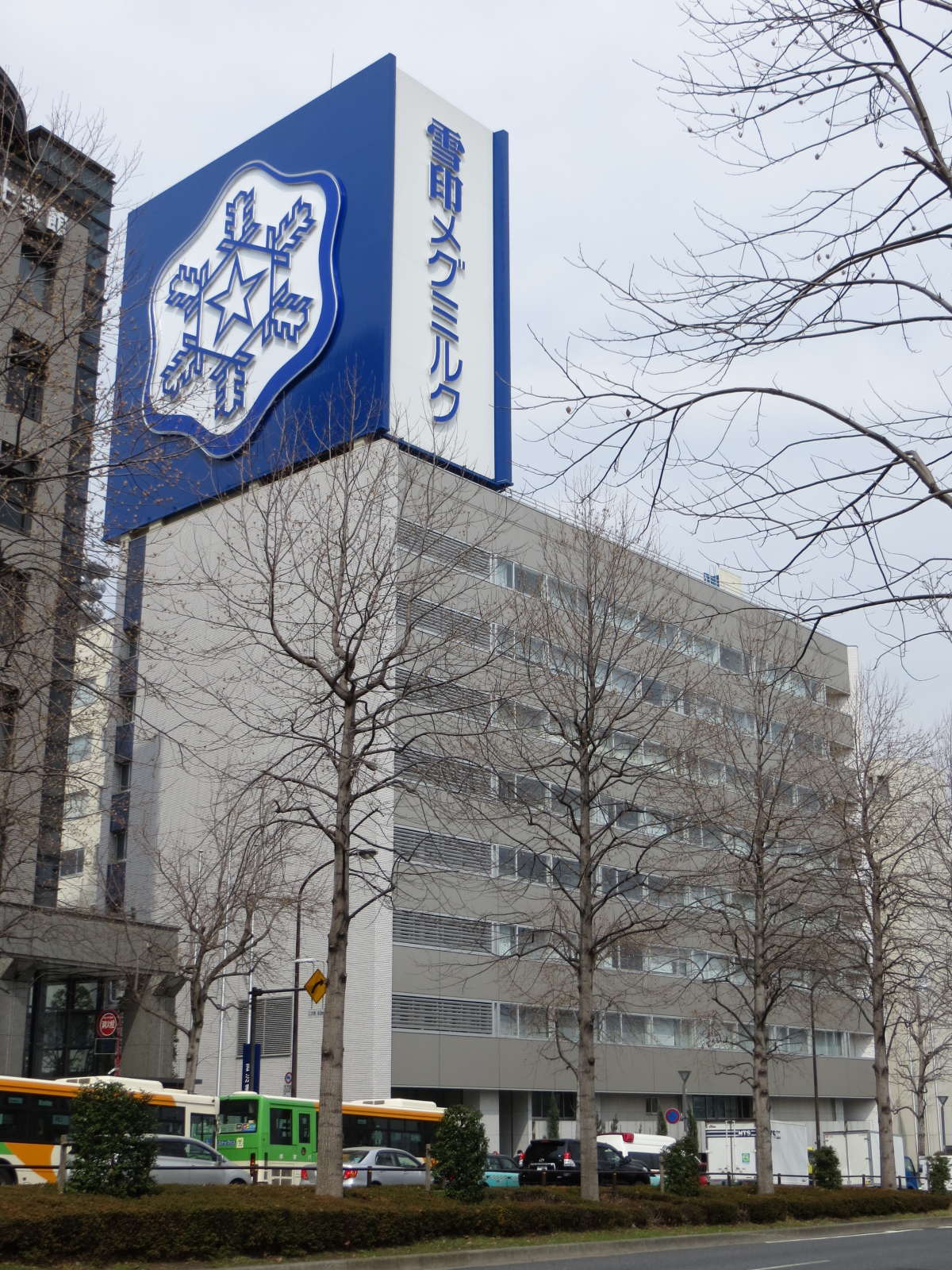
- Formerly: Snow Brand Milk Products Co., Ltd.
- Company type: Public kabushiki gaisha
- Traded as: TYO: 2270
- Industry: Dairy
- Founded: 1 October 2009; 15 years ago (as Megmilk Snow Brand)
- Headquarters: Shinjuku, Tokyo and Sapporo, Hokkaido, Japan
- Products: Milk products
- Owners: ZEN-NOH (13.62%); Norinchukin Bank (9.92%); Updated 31 March 2018
- Website: www.meg-snow.com

Megmilk Snow Brand Co., Ltd. (雪印メグミルク株式会社, Yukijirushi Megumiruku Kabushiki-gaisha; TYO: 2270), formerly Snow Brand Milk Products Co., Ltd. (雪印乳業株式会社, Yukijirushi Nyūgyō Kabushiki-gaisha; TYO: 2262) is one of the largest dairy companies in Japan.

In 2000, more than 14,000 people got sick from milk sold by Snow Brand contaminated with Staphylococcus aureus bacteria, with the incident being the worst case of food poisoning recorded in Japan. A criminal probe into the company led to some senior managers being charged with professional negligence. Two were convicted, and were given suspended sentences. The company was criticized for failing to recall their product quickly.

In January 2003, the company merged with two farm organizations, the National Federation of Agricultural Cooperative Associations and the National Federation of Dairy Cooperative Associations, as the Nippon Milk Community Co. and eventually rebranded as the Megmilk Snow Brand Company. Megmilk Snow Brand has a dairy museum in Sapporo.
