= Yasashii Kimochi =

Single by Chara

from the album Junior Sweet
- B-side: "Junior Sweet"
- Released: April 23, 1997
- Genre: Trip hop, alternative pop
- Length: 3:29
- Label: Sony Music Japan
- Songwriter: Chara
- Producer: Zentarō Watanabe

Chara singles chronology
"Chara no Boogie Shoes with The 99 1/2" (1996)	"Yasashii Kimochi" (1997)	"Time Machine" (1997)

"Yasashii Kimochi" (やさしい気持ち, Kind Feelings) is a song by Chara, released as the first single from her 1997 album Junior Sweet. The song was used in a Shiseido commercial for their 'Tessera J' range. The B-side of this single, Junior Sweet, was also used in these commercials.

The song debuted at #10 on Oricon charts. Four weeks later, it reached its peak of #7. It stayed on the charts for 16 weeks, eventually selling approximately 520,000 copies.

When the Junior Sweet was released, the song featured as a different version with a drawn-out introduction, labelled the Shiawase Version (しあわせ・ヴァージョン, Happy Version).

In 2009, the pop/hiphop duo Halcali heavily sampled Yasashii Kimochi in their single Re:Yasashii Kimochi The new lyrics written by Halcali and their producer Pal@pop, act as an 'answer song' to the original lyrics.

== Music video ==
Chara in the music video.

The music video was shot by directorial pair Blaine & Justin. It centres around three differently dressed Charas. One is a white haired 'mannequin' who bangs a drum, one is a regularly dressed one who rides a merry-go-round, and the other is a dark-haired official who operates the ride. The video ends with the white haired Chara lit in blue with green antlers behind her.

As of August 24, 2019 the music video for Yasashii Kimochi has been viewed more than 3,400,000 times on popular video-sharing website YouTube.

== Track listing ==
=== Single ===
No.	Title	Writer(s)	Arranger	Length
1.	"Yasashii Kimochi (やさしい気持ち, Kind Feelings)"	Chara	Zentarō Watanabe	3:29
2.	"Junior Sweet"	Chara, Shinichi Osawa	Shinichi Osawa	6:27

== Chart rankings ==
=== Oricon Charts (Japan) ===
Release	Chart	Peak position	First week sales	Sales total	Chart run
April 23, 1997	Oricon Daily Singles Chart				
April 23, 1997	Oricon Weekly Singles Chart	7	65,500	878,150	16 weeks
April 23, 1997	Oricon Yearly Singles Chart	56			

== Cover versions ==
- Halcali (2009, single Re:Yasashii Kimochi) (heavily sampled)
- Marié Digby (2009, album Second Home)
- Noelle (2008, album Love Electro)
- Nao Toyama (2018, Tsuki ga Kirei, insert song)
- Rie Takahashi (2019, Teasing Master Takagi-san 2 ending theme)
