= Sweet (Chara album) =

Studio album by Chara
- Released: November 1, 1991
- Recorded: 1991
- Genre: J-pop; Synthpop; Alternative pop
- Length: 44:29
- Label: Sony Music Japan
- Producer: U-Ske Asada

Chara chronology
Sweet (1991)	Soul Kiss (1992)

Singles from Sweet
- 1. "Heaven" Released: September 21, 1991; 2. "Sweet" Released: January 22, 1992; 3. "No Toy (Re-Mix)" Released: April 22, 1992

Sweet (スウィート, Sūīto) is the debut studio album by Chara, which was released on November 11, 1991. It debuted at #64 on the Japanese Oricon album charts, and charted in the top 200 for two weeks. It eventually sold 11,000 copies, making it Chara's least sold album.

It was preceded by her debut single Heaven in September. The album also had two re-cut singles: the title track Sweet (released in January) and a remix single called No Toy (Re-Mix), featuring three alternative mixes of album tracks. None of these three songs charted in the Oricon top 100 singles.

== Track listing ==
No.	Title	Lyrics	Music	Arranger(s)	Length
1.	"Rainbow Gossip"	Chara	Chara, Mizuho Hirata	U-Ske Asada	5:22
2.	"Heaven"	Chara, U-Ske Asada	Chara, U-Ske Asada	U-Ske Asada	4:46
3.	"Usotsuku no ni Narenaide (うそつくのに慣れないで, Don't Get Used to Lying)"	Chara	Chara	U-Ske Asada	4:09
4.	"Family"	Chara	Chara	David Motion	4:37
5.	"Sweet"	Chara	Chara, U-Ske Asada	U-Ske Asada	4:42
6.	"X'mas"	Chara	Chara	U-Ske Asada	5:15
7.	"No Toy"	Chara	Chara	Charles Pierre	4:03
8.	"Anata o Oikoshita (あなたを追い越した, I Passed You)"	Chara	Chikuzen Satō	Charles Pierre	4:57
9.	"Break These Chain"	Chara	Chara	U-Ske Asada	5:39
10.	"Onna no Ko (女の子, Girl)"		U-Ske Asada	U-Ske Asada	0:59

== Japan Sales Rankings ==
Release	Chart	Peak position	First week sales	Sales total	Chart run
November 1, 1991	Oricon Daily Albums Chart				
November 1, 1991	Oricon Weekly Albums Chart	64		11,000	2 weeks
November 1, 1991	Oricon Yearly Albums Chart				
