= Swallowtail Butterfly (Ai no Uta) =

Single by Yen Town Band (Chara)

from the album Montage
- B-side: "Mama's Alright"
- Released: July 22, 1996
- Genre: J-pop
- Length: 4:49
- Label: Sony Music Japan
- Songwriters: Chara, Shunji Iwai, Takeshi Kobayashi, Takayo Nagasawa, Bryan Burton-Lewis
- Producer: Takeshi Kobayashi

Yen Town Band (Chara) singles chronology
"Tiny Tiny Tiny" (1995)	"Swallowtail Butterfly (Ai no Uta)" (1996)	""Chara no Boogie Shoes" with The 99 1/2" (1996)

"Swallowtail Butterfly (Ai no Uta)" (あいのうた, Suwarōteiru Batafurai Ai no Uta; "Love Song") is a song by Chara, released under the name Yen Town Band. It was the lead single from Montage, a concept album released for the Shunji Iwai film Swallowtail Butterfly that also starred Chara. This song was used as the theme song for the film.

The single debuted at #31 on Oricon's singles charts. Two months later, after the release of the film and album, the single managed to reach #1.

The song was written by Takeshi Kobayashi, in collaboration with Chara and film director Shunji Iwai.

== Music video ==
The music video begins with a long panning shot over a cityscape. It then shows Chara against a farm windmill. It then switches to a junkyard, where Chara and several other people are filtering through rubbish. They eventually find a working piano, which they bring back on the back of a pickup truck. Chara plays the piano as the car drives off. This scene is interspersed with scenes from the movie.

== Track listing ==
Single
No.	Title	Lyrics	Music	Arranger	Length
1.	"Swallowtail Butterfly (Ai no Uta)"	Shunji Iwai, Takeshi Kobayashi, Chara	Takeshi Kobayashi	Takeshi Kobayashi	4:49
2.	"Mama's Alright"	Takeshi Kobayashi, Takayo Nagasawa, Bryan Burton-Lewis	Takeshi Kobayashi	Takeshi Kobayashi	4:11

== Chart rankings ==
Charts (1996)	Peak position
Oricon weekly singles	1
Oricon yearly singles	26
Charts (2010)	Peak position
RIAJ Digital Track Chart Top 100: Moumoon cover	40
RIAJ Digital Track Chart Top 100: Kumi Koda cover	45

=== Sales ===
Chart	Amount
Oricon physical sales	878,000

== Cover versions ==
- Cinnabom (2007, compilation album Sound of Kula)
- Hiromi Hirata (as Makoto Kikuchi) (2007, album The Idolmaster Master Artist 04)
- Yoshihiko Kai (2007, album 10 Stories)
- Kumi Koda (2010, album Eternity: Love & Songs)
- Scott Murphy (from Allister) (2008, album Guilty Pleasures II)
- Moumoon (2010, EP Spark)
- My Little Lover (2001, album Singles). Released as a self-cover (Takeshi Kobayashi was, at the time, a member of My Little Lover.) A music video was released.
- Ayano Tsuji (2004, album Cover Girl)
- Nagi Yanagi (2013, album Euaru)
- Kana Hanazawa (2019, anime Afterlost)
