= Swallowtail Butterfly (film) =

- Theatrical release poster

Japanese name
- Katakana: スワロウテイル
Transcriptions
- Revised Hepburn: Suwarōteiru
- Directed by: Shunji Iwai
- Written by: Shunji Iwai
- Produced by: Shinya Kawai; Kazutoshi Wadakura; Osamu Kubota; Hiroko Maeda
- Starring: Hiroshi Mikami; Chara; Ayumi Ito; Yōsuke Eguchi; Andy Hui; Atsuro Watabe
- Cinematography: Noboru Shinoda
- Edited by: Shunji Iwai
- Music by: Takeshi Kobayashi
- Production companies: Oorong-Sha Co., Ltd.; Pony Canyon; Nippon Herald Films; Fuji Television Network; Ace Pictures
- Distributed by: Kadokawa Herald
- Release date: September 14, 1996 (Japan)
- Running time: 148 minutes
- Country: Japan
- Language: Japanese; English; Mandarin
- Box office: ¥600 million

Swallowtail Butterfly (Japanese: スワロウテイル, Hepburn: Suwarōteiru; lit. 'Swallowtail') is a 1996 Japanese crime film written, directed and edited by Shunji Iwai, starring Hiroshi Mikami, pop-singer Chara, and Ayumi Ito.

The film was shot on hand-held cameras using jump cuts and other visual techniques. It covers a wide array of themes and genres, from social realism to coming-of-age to crime. The film was re-released with a 4K restoration in Japanese theaters on 4 September 2026.

A theme song for the film under Yen Town Band, titled "Swallowtail Butterfly (Ai no Uta)", topped the Oricon Singles Chart on October 7, 1996.

== Plot ==
The film is set in Tokyo at an unspecified point in the near future when the Japanese yen has become the strongest currency in the world. This attracts an influx of immigrants, legal and illegal, to work in the city. The immigrants give the city the nickname Yen Town (円都, en to). The Japanese natives, however, despise the nickname, and in retribution call the immigrants by the homophone Yen Thieves (円盗, en tou), anglicised as "Yentowns" by the film's English and Japanese-speaking characters.

The film begins with the death of a Chinese prostitute, upon which her daughter, still nameless and unable to speak Chinese, is passed on from prostitute to prostitute until she comes upon one named Glico (after the corporation), who is also a singer on the side. The girl's full background is unknown, though she speaks English and Japanese. Glico sells her to an adult club, where she is assaulted by the manager. Seeing this, Glico flees with her and invites her to stay at her home. Glico reveals her story - she came from Shanghai with her two brothers, named Ryanki and Ryankai, who lived as criminals. Ryanki gave her the name Glico, after the corporation. After a robbery gone wrong, Ryanki is killed, and Rankai fled the scene. Glico, after the butterfly tattoo on her own chest, decides to name the girl Ageha, the name for the swallowtail butterfly in Japanese.

In a Yentown settlement named Aozora (Blue Sky), Fei Hong, a scammer with a defective leg, lives with his associates. When Glico brings Ageha to them, they think she is selling her, but she rebuffs these accusations. Ageha becomes part of Fei Hong's crew, salvaging mechanical scrap from landfills and working at Aozora's bar at might. One night, Ageha visits Arrow, an American former boxer who is a part of Fei Hong's crew, and learns how to box. That night, Ageha returns to her sleeping place, Glico's closet, but a client, Sudō, inadvertently hears Ageha's music from the closet and sexually assaults her, and then Glico. Ageha runs to Arrow, who knocks Sudō out of the window, Sudō is killed almost immediately by being run over by a truck, witnessed by fellow Yentown Reiko.

The Yentowns decide to dispose of Sudō's body, but upon doing so, discover within his guts a rare cassette tape of My Way by Frank Sinatra. Meanwhile, an organized crime group named the Kinoshita Group is set upon in a dinner by the Yentown Liumang, a Chinese organized crime syndicate led by Ryou Ryanki and his lieutenant Mao Fu, looking for the tape carried by Sudō. Ryanki kills the leader of the group, thinking that he is lying that he does not know where Sudō is.

One of the Aozora crew, Ran (nationality unknown, but is Korean in the novelization), an assassin on the side, receives intelligence on the missing Sudō and the gang war. He discovers that the cassette tape includes magnetic information corresponding to a 10,000 yen note, which can be copied easily onto a 1,000 yen note by simply adding tape onto it, allowing for counterfeit money to be made. The Yentowns exploit this and quickly make money. Arrow and Nihat, another one of the Yentowns, leave Japan to go to their home countries, but the rest of the group buy a live music venue in the city, calling it the Yen Town Club. The club is only owned de jure by Asakawa, a Japanese man who has sold his life and life insurance, as Yentowns cannot own such property. The club recruits a band named the Yen Town Band (a real band made for the film, for which Chara provided the music for the film). The band is made up of white immigrants aside from Glico, the singer.

While pasting Yen Town Club posters in the streets, Ageha is attacked by a group of young deliquents, but her boxing training allows her to overpower them. The Yen Town Club becomes a sensation, leading to Glico being approached for a record deal. Despite being Chinese, the record company executives believe that Glico's singing can create hits. At the same time, Fei Hong, who is now romantically involved with Glico, is reported to the police for his immigration status by Hoshino, one of the company executives.

Ageha begins to learn Chinese, and constantly visits Fei Hong in jail, giving him onigiri and telling him that the band's new single, Shanghai Baby, is sold out. The deliquents who once tried to beat up Ageha have become her underlings, and come across as shipment of heroin. While testing it, Ageha overdoses on it. The delinquents run to the nearest taxi for help, which Ryo Ryanki is riding. He carries her to a Yentown doctor, who saves her. Seeing the poster of Glico on the wall, Ryanki recalls his younger days when he was with his siblings.

After a botched immigration hearing, and being too poor to afford a plane ticket back to China, Fei Hong runs out of the immigration office as a free man. He is bribed by Hoshino for 100,000 yen to forget about Glico. Upon returning to the club, Fei Hong is attacked by the band members, who demand to quit and believe he has sold out Glico. The Yen Town Club is then taken down. Ageha goes back to the Yentown doctor, asking for a tattoo of a swallowtail butterfly like Glico has. During the process, she remembers a moment from her childhood in which she was reaching for a butterfly while her mother was busy with a client.

Reiko goes to a reporter named Suzukino, to which she reveals that the death of Sudō happened in Glico's apartment. They find evidence that Glico was once a prostitute. Ageha returns to Aozora, where she demands the tape of My Way from Ran to buy the club back. She uses the tape and her network among the underground to generate money. Meanwhile, Glico is interviewed by Suzukino, who asks her about the death of Sudō. During a taxi ride with Suzukino, Glico is attacked by Ryanki's gang looking for the tape, and is captured. She contacts Fei Hong, now in hiding, who tells her to go to Aozora. In another car owned by the Yentown Liumang, Fei Hong and Asakawa kill the gang members. While trying to hold a taxi driver hostage to get to Aozora, Fei Hong uses one of the counterfeit 10,000 yen bills at a cash converter machine, upon which he is caught by the police.

The Liumang show up in numbers to Aozora under the command of Mao Fu in search of the tape, who leads Glico and Suzukino to Ran. The Aozora crew takes out the Liumang with a rocket launcher ambush, and Ran kills the shocked Mao Fu with a shotgun. Ageha tries to buy back the Yen Town Club with the money that she has made, but finds out that it has already been sold - the real estate agent tries to kill her, but backs out at the last moment.

Fei Hong is falsely interrogated by Japanese immigration authorities for the forged bills - despite saying that he knows nothing, he is brutalized by the police, flipping the epithet of "Yentown" upon them by calling their hometowns "Yentowns". Fei Hong succumbs to his injuries. Glico and Ageha, now back at Aozora, hold a funeral for Fei Hong, upon which Ageha and the children of Aozora take her money and throw it into a fire.

Some time later, Ran and other assassins ready for an assassination on Ryanki. Ryanki requests his taxi to stop upon seeing Ageha, who he has a chat with. Ageha reveals that her name was given to her by Glico, Ryanki's sister.

== Cast ==
- Hiroshi Mikami as Fei Hong
- Chara as Glico
- Ayumi Ito as Ageha
- Yōsuke Eguchi as Ryo Ranki
- Andy Hui as Mao Fu
- Atsuro Watabe as Ran
- Tomoko Yamaguchi as Shen Mei
- Nene Otsuka as Reiko
- Kaori Momoi as Suzukino
- Tadanobu Asano as Customer in club

== Production ==
Swallowtail Butterfly, being made in the mid-90s, was made at a point in which the Japanese yen had hit a high of 79.5 against the U.S. dollar, creating the premise of the gold-rush that underpins the film.

In a film where Japanese characters are scarce, director Shunji Iwai said that the film was about "people who don’t have anything but themselves". The film was shot in a combination of 35mm and 16mm film, which the director says was "a fairly reckless thing to do, but I don’t think we could have finished shooting otherwise", citing that 16mm film is cheaper. For the 4K re-release of the film in 2026, 30 years after its premiere, Iwai directed the restoration with darker color grading reflecting the capabilities of modern IMAX projections.

== Awards ==
- 1997 Japanese Academy Awards - Newcomer of the Year (Ayumi Ito)
- 1997 Japanese Academy Awards - Most Popular Film
- 1998 Fant-Asia Film Festival - Best Asian Film

Swallowtail Butterfly was also nominated for but did not win the following awards:

- 1997 Japanese Academy Awards - Best Actress (Chara)
- 1997 Japanese Academy Awards - Best Art Direction (Yohei Taneda)
- 1997 Japanese Academy Awards - Best Cinematography (Noboru Shinoda)
- 1997 Japanese Academy Awards - Best Film
- 1997 Japanese Academy Awards - Best Lighting (Yūki Nakamura)
- 1997 Japanese Academy Awards - Best Sound (Osamu Takizawa)
- 1997 Japanese Academy Awards - Best Supporting Actress (Ayumi Ito)
- 1997 Moscow Film Festival - Golden St. George Award
