= Zentaro Watanabe =

Japanese musician (1963–2021)

Zentaro Watanabe 渡辺善太郎
- Zentaro Watanabe as a member of Shijin no Chi in 1990

Background information
- Also known as: Atami
- Born: 9 August 1963
- Origin: Kurashiki, Japan
- Died: 22 July 2021 (aged 57)
- Occupation(s): Singer, producer
- Years active: 1986–2021
- Labels: Epic Records Japan, Avex Trax, Rainbow Entertainment, Toy's Factory
- Formerly of: Shijin no Chi; Oh! Penelope; Atami

Zentaro Watanabe (渡辺 善太郎, Watanabe Zentarō; 9 August 1963 – 22 July 2021) was a Japanese musician and music producer. He debuted as a musician in 1986 as the guitarist for the band Shijin no Chi, later forming the duo Oh! Penelope with former bandmate Mutsuji Tsuji. Since the mid-1990s, Watanabe worked as a music producer, creating songs such as Chara's "Yasashii Kimochi" (1997), Hitomi's "Love 2000" and Ikimonogakari's "Hana wa Sakura Kimi wa Utsukushi" (2008). In 2000, Watanabe launched a solo project entitled Atami.

== Biography ==
Watanabe debuted as a member of the band Shijin no Chi, through Epic Records Japan. By 1993, the three-person unit had released five studio albums. In March 1994, Watanabe retooled the group as a duo, creating Oh! Penelope with Shijin no Chi's vocalist Mutsuji Tsuji. Oh! Penelope's mini album Photograph (1995) was one of the first enhanced CDs released in Japan. After releasing their debut full-length album Milk & Cookies in March 1997, the band disbanded by June. After the band's disbandment, Watanabe focused on working as a music producer, producing music such as Chara's "Yasashii Kimochi" (1997) and "70% (Yūgure no Uta)" (1999), Hitomi songs such as "Love 2000" and "Samurai Drive" (2001).

In April 2000, Watanabe began working on Atami (stylised as atami), a solo music project involving guest vocalists, such as Miho Hatori, Chara, Hitomi and Kirinji. Atami's self-titled debut album released in February 2001. In 2002, the band's single "Under the Sun" with Bonnie Pink was used as the theme song for the Yōsuke Kubozuka-starring film Laundry. In March, the second Atami album was released.

In addition to popular music, Watanabe worked as a music producer for the films Laundry (2001), Gravity's Clowns (2009), On Next Sunday (2009) and My Rainy Days (2009). In 2012, Watanabe worked as the music producer for the NHK drama Hatsukoi, and in 2013 for the anime Nagi-Asu: A Lull in the Sea.

After a long period of illness, Watanabe died from pancreatic cancer on 22 July 2021. His death was announced five days later by the Japan Federation of Music Producers.

== Atami discography ==
=== Studio albums ===
List of albums, with selected chart positions
Title	Album details
Atami	Released: 15 February 2001; Label: Avex Trax; Formats: CD, digital download, LP
Doppler	Released: 27 March 2002; Label: Cutting Edge; Formats: CD, digital download

=== Compilation albums ===
Title	Album details
Best	Released: 9 February 2018; Label: Cutting Edge; Formats: CD, digital download

=== Singles ===
List of singles, with selected chart positions
Title	Year	Album
"Nightingale" (featuring Bice)	2000	Atami
"August" (八月, Hachigatsu) (featuring Miho Hatori)	2000	Atami
"Mica" (featuring Chara)	2001	Atami
"Under the Sun" (featuring Bonnie Pink)	2002	Doppler
