= Towa Tei discography =

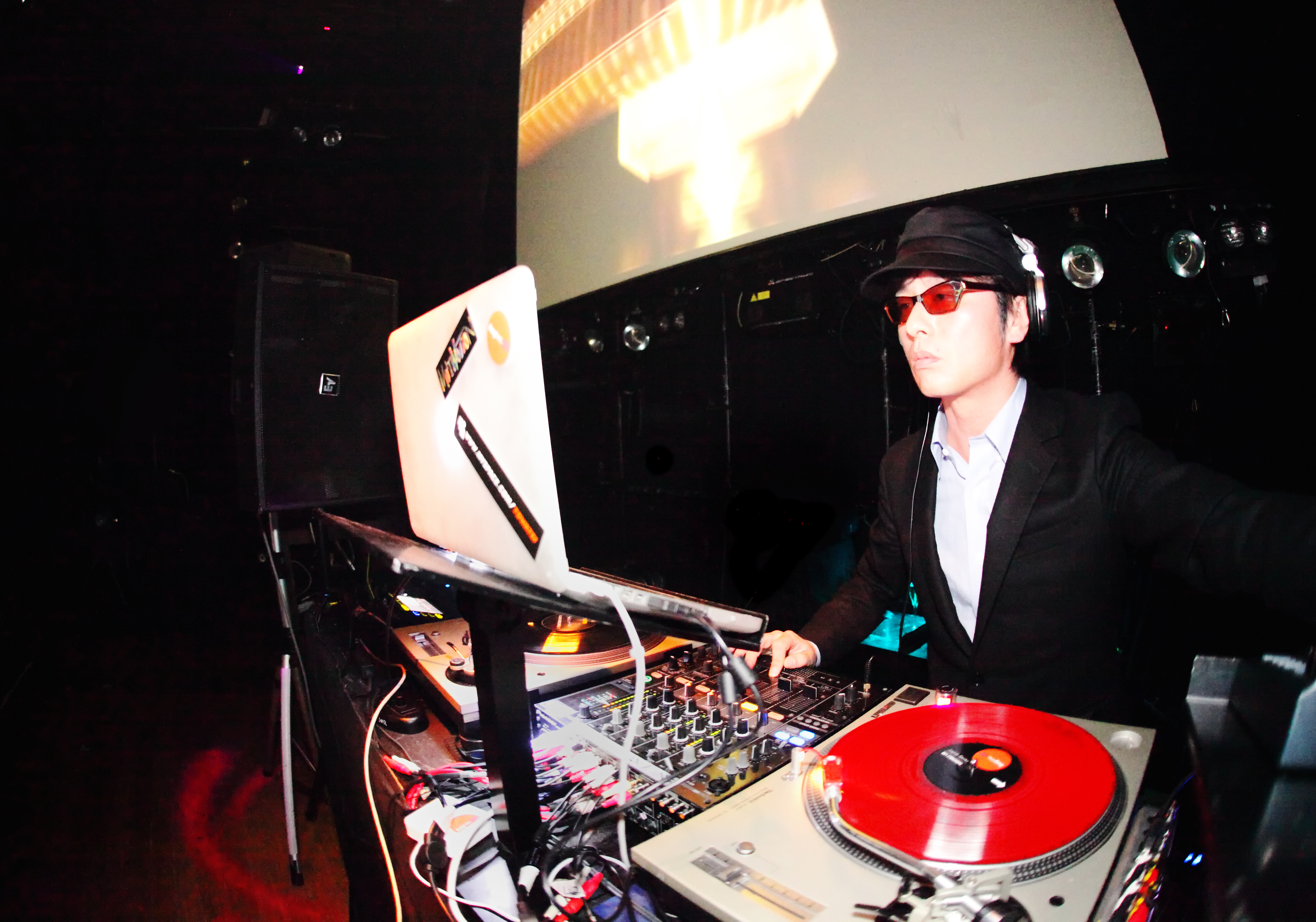
- Towa Tei in 2010
- Studio albums: 11
- EPs: 3
- Soundtrack albums: 2
- Singles: 26

The solo discography of Japanese musician Towa Tei and his side project Sweet Robots Against the Machine includes 11 studio albums, two compilation albums, two soundtracks, three extended plays and nine singles. Towa Tei came to fame in 1990 as a member of the American house group Deee-Lite in 1990, and released his debut solo album Future Listening! in 1994.

== Studio albums ==
List of albums, with selected chart positions
Title	Album details	Peak positions	
Title	Album details	JPN Oricon (Note: Sources for additional chart positions are as follows: Future Listening!, Sweet Robots Against the Machine, "Happy", Sound Museum, Butterfly, "Let Me Know", Last Century Modern, "Kasei", Towa Tei Best, Motivation Songs for Make-Up, Motivation Driving Sweets, Towa Tei, Re: Towa Tei, Flash,)	JPN Billboard (Note: The Hot Albums chart was established in 2015.) (Note: Sources for chart positions are as follows: Cute, Emo.)
Future Listening!	Released: October 21, 1994; Label: For Life Music, Elektra Records; Formats: CD, 2CD, LP, digital download	50	—
Sweet Robots Against the Machine	As Sweet Robots Against the Machine; Released: February 10, 1997; Label: EastWest Japan; Formats: 2CD, LP, digital download	55	—
Sound Museum	Released: May 25, 1997; Label: EastWest Japan, Elektra; Formats: CD, LP, digital download	17	—
Last Century Modern	Released: July 28, 1999; Label: EastWest, Elektra; Formats: CD, LP, digital download	20	—
Towa Tei	As Sweet Robots Against the Machine; Released: May 2, 2002; Label: Cutting Edge; Formats: CD, LP, digital download	55	—
Flash	Released: April 2, 2005; Label: V2 Records; Formats: CD, digital download	55	—
Big Fun	Released: February 4, 2009; Label: Columbia Music Entertainment; Formats: CD, CD/DVD, digital download	25	— (Note: The album charted at number 32 on the Top Albums Sales chart, prior to the establishment of the Hot Albums Chart in 2015.)
Sunny	Released: May 11, 2011; Label: Hug Inc; Formats: CD, digital download	23	— (Note: The album charted at number 20 on the Top Albums Sales chart, and number one on the Top Independent Albums and Singles chart, prior to the establishment of the Hot Albums Chart in 2015.)
Lucky	Released: July 10, 2013; Label: Warner Music Japan, Hug Inc; Formats: CD, digital download	36	— (Note: The album charted at number 28 on the Top Albums Sales chart, prior to the establishment of the Hot Albums Chart in 2015.)
Cute	Released: July 29, 2015; Label: Hug Inc; Formats: CD, digital download	52	74
Emo	Released: March 22, 2017; Label: Hug Inc; Formats: CD, digital download	34	53
LP	Released: March 12, 2021; Label: Nippon Columbia; Formats: CD, LP, digital download	44	56
Zoundtracks	Released: September 6, 2023; Label: Nippon Columbia; Formats: CD, Cassette, digital download	55	49
Touch	Released: September 6, 2023; Label: Nippon Columbia; Formats: CD, LP, digital download	52	60
"—" denotes items which did not chart, or were released before the creation of a chart.

== Extended plays ==
List of albums, with selected chart positions
Title	Album details	Peak positions	
Title	Album details	JPN Oricon	JPN Billboard
Butterfly	Released: October 25, 1998; Label: EastWest; Formats: CD	88	—
Alignment EP	As Sweet Robots Against the Machine; Released: April 21, 2011; Label: Machbeat; Formats: digital download	—	—
Mach 2012	Released: May 2, 2012; Label: Machbeat; Formats: CD	143	— (Note: The album charted at number 92 on the Top Albums Sales chart, and number 23 on the Top Independent Albums and Singles chart, prior to the establishment of the Hot Albums Chart in 2015.)
"—" denotes items which did not chart, were ineligible to chart, or were released before the creation of a chart.

== Compilation albums ==
List of albums, with selected chart positions
Title	Album details	Peak positions
Title	Album details	JPN Oricon
The Best of Towa Tei Works	Released: March 4, 1998; Label: For Life Records; Formats: CD	—
Towa Tei Best	Released: October 24, 2001; Label: EastWest Japan; Formats: CD	40
Best Korea	Released: November 12, 2002; Label: S.M. Entertainment; Formats: CD	—
94–14 Remix	Released: July 23, 2014; Label: Warner; Formats: CD	158
94–14	Released: September 3, 2014; Label: Warner; Formats: CD	156
94–14 Covers	Released: September 3, 2014; Label: Warner; Formats: CD	165
"—" denotes items which did not chart.

== DJ mix compilation albums ==
List of albums, with selected chart positions
Title	Album details	Peak positions
Title	Album details	JPN Oricon
Motivation Songs for Make-Up	Released: September 18, 2003; Label: Cutting Edge; Formats: CD	—
Motivation Driving Sweets	Released: March 17, 2004; Label: Cutting Edge; Formats: CD	148
Motivation 3	Released: April 19, 2006; Label: Cutting Edge; Formats: CD	148
Motivation 4 Dusty Dance Hall	Released: August 19, 2006; Label: Cutting Edge; Formats: CD	—
Motivation Five	Released: June 20, 2007; Label: Nippon Columbia; Formats: CD	117
Motivation 6 Adult Oriented Click Nonstop-Mix by Moodman	Released: December 5, 2007; Label: Nippon Columbia; Formats: CD	—
Motivation 7	Released: December 5, 2007; Label: Nippon Columbia; Formats: CD	189
Motivation H	Released: July 7, 2010; Label: Hug inc.; Formats: CD	168
The Beat Goes On	Released: December 5, 2012; Label: Ultra-Vybe; Formats: CD	—
"—" denotes items which did not chart.

== Remix albums ==
List of albums, with selected chart positions
Title	Album details	Peak positions
Title	Album details	JPN Oricon
Future Recall!	Released: December 16, 1994; Label: For Life Records; Formats: CD	—
Future Recall 2	Released: March 17, 1995; Label: For Life Records; Formats: CD	—
Stupid Fresh	Released: November 27, 1997; Label: EastWest Japan; Formats: CD	—
Lost Control Mix	Released: November 25, 1999; Label: EastWest Japan; Formats: CD	—
Lost Control Mix Disc 2	Released: January 26, 2000; Label: EastWest Japan; Formats: CD	—
Re:Towa Tei	Sweet Robots Against the Machine; Released: February 26, 2003; Label: Cutting Edge; Formats: CD	115
Flasher	Released: November 23, 2005; Label: Cutting Edge; Formats: CD	159
"—" denotes items which did not chart.

== Soundtracks ==
List of albums, with selected chart positions
Title	Album details
Visionary Soundtrack by Towa Tei	Released: July 25, 1998; Label: East West Japan; Formats: CD
Dai Nipponjin Original Soundtrack	Soundtrack for the film Big Man Japan (2007); Released: November 28, 2007; Label: Nippon Columbia; Formats: CD
Super Crooks (Soundtrack from the Netflix Series)	Soundtrack for the series Super Crooks; Released: November 27, 2021; Label: Maisie Music Publishing

== Singles ==
List of singles, with selected chart positions
Title	Year	Peak chart positions						Album
Title	Year	JPN Oricon	JPN Billboard (Note: Sources for chart positions are as follows: "Mind Wall", "Radio", "Apple".)	AUS	KOR Overseas (Note: Week references for Gaon: "The Burning Plain", "Mind Wall")	UK	US Dance	Album
"Technova" (featuring Bebel Gilberto)	1995	—	—	—	—	—	22	Future Listening!
"Luv Connection" (featuring Joi Cardwell, Vivien Sessoms)	1995	—	—	—	—	178	30	Future Listening!
"Happy" (featuring Vivian Sessoms and Bahamadia)	1997	94	—	—	—	—	3	Sound Museum
"GBI (German Bold Italic)" (featuring Kylie Minogue and Haruomi Hosono)	1997	—	—	50	—	63	—	Sound Museum
"A Ring" (featuring Pascale Borel)	1999	—	—	—	—	—	—	Last Century Modern
"Let Me Know" (featuring Chara))	1999	34	—	—	—	—	—	Last Century Modern
"Funkin' for Jamaica" (featuring Joanne, Les Nubians, Wisdom Life & Tom Browne)	1999	—	—	—	—	—	—	Last Century Modern
"Last Century Modern" (featuring UA)	1999	—	—	—	—	—	—	Last Century Modern
"Mars" (火星, Kasei) (featuring Ikuko Harada)	2000	61	—	—	—	—	—	Towa Tei Best
"Funkin' for Jamaica" (re-release) (featuring Joanne, Les Nubians, Wisdom Life & Tom Browne)	2001	—	—	—	—	—	—	Last Century Modern
"Koi no Upload" (恋のアップロード; "Love Upload")	2006	—	—	—	—	—	—	Non-album single
"A.O.R." (featuring Lina Ohta)	2008	—	—	—	—	—	—	Big Fun
"Mind Wall" (featuring Miho Hatori)	2008	—	21	—	48	—	—	Big Fun
"Taste of You" (featuring Taprikk Sweezee)	2009	—	— (Note: "Taste of You" charted at number 98 on Adult Contemporary Airplay chart.)	—	—	—	—	Big Fun
"Marvelous" (with Yurico)	2010	—	—	—	—	—	—	Sunny
"The Burning Plain" (with Yukihiro Takahashi & Kiko Mizuhara)	2011	—	— (Note: "The Burning Plain" charted at number 56 on Adult Contemporary Airplay chart.)	—	28	—	—	Sunny
"Licht"	2013	—	—	—	—	—	—	Lucky
"Radio" (with Yukihiro Takahashi & Tina Tamashiro)	2013	—	78	—	—	—	—	Lucky
"Apple" (with Ringo Sheena)	2013	76 (Note: 2015 release.)	60	—	—	—	—	Lucky
"Hold Me Tighter in the Rain" (with Vivien Sessoms)	2013	—	—	—	—	—	—	94–14 Covers
"18" (with Shinichi Osawa)	2014	—	—	—	—	—	—	Non-album single
"Chaise Longue"	2014	—	—	—	—	—	—	Cute
"Heaven" (with Junko Wada)	2015	—	—	—	—	—	—	Cute
"Cul de Sac" (with Leo Imai)	2015	—	—	—	—	—	—	Cute
"Sound of Music" (with UA)	2015	—	—	—	—	—	—	Cute
"Brand New Emo" (Towa Tei as Metafive with Mizuhara Sisters)	2017	186	—	—	—	—	—	Emo
"—" denotes items which did not chart, were released before the creation of the Billboard Japan Hot 100, or were not released in this region.

== Promotional singles ==
List of singles, with selected chart positions
Title	Year	Peak chart positions	Album
Title	Year	US Dance	Album
"Batucada" (featuring Bebel Gilberto)	1996	—	Future Listening!
"Forget Me Nots" (Sweet Robots Against the Machine featuring Viviam Sessions & Joi Cardwell)	1997	—	Sweet Robots Against the Machine
"Private Eyes" (featuring Bebel Gilberto)	1997	—	Sound Museum
"Butterfly" (featuring Ayumi Tanabe and Vivian Sessoms)	1998	—	Butterfly / Last Century Modern
"Congratulations!" (featuring Cory Daye)	1999	30	Last Century Modern
"Free" (Sweet Robots Against the Machine with Rozz, Vivian Sessoms & Juiceman)	2002	—	Towa Tei
"Latte Macaron"	2002	—	Towa Tei
"Different Nu Nu"	2004	—	Flash
"Sometime Samurai" (featuring Kylie Minogue)	2005	—	Flash
"Melody" (featuring Byron Stingily)	2005	—	Flash
"Milky Way" (featuring Ryuichi Sakamoto, Yukalicious)	2005	—	Flash
"My Sharona" (featuring Buffalo Daughter, Tycoon Tosh)	2005	—	Flash
"N705i" (Note: Commercial jingle for the NTT DoCoMo phone of the same name, and originally released to iTunes. In 2008, the song was re-arranged and re-titled "A.O.R.")	2008	—	Non-album single
"Pac Is Back!" (Note: Promotional song to celebrate the 30th anniversary of the release of the game Pac-Man.)	2010	—	Non-album single
"Upload" (with Bakubaku Dokin)	2011	—	Mach 2012
"Milky Way"	2012	—	Mach 2012
"Wordy" (with Bakubaku Dokin)	2012	—	Mach 2012
"Luv Pandemic" (with Haruomi Hosono, Yukihiro Takahashi)	2015	—	Cute
"—" denotes items which did not chart or were not released in this region.

== Remixes ==
- Sean Callery - 24 Theme (Towa Tei 24 Hours Remix)
- Björk - Hyperballad (Towa Tei Remix)
- Benjamin Biolay - Les Cerfs Volants (Towa Tei Remix)
- En Vogue - Whatever (Towa Tei Remix)
