= Sometime Samurai =

2005 promotional single by Towa Tei and Kylie Minogue

Promotional single by Towa Tei featuring Kylie Minogue

from the album Flash
- Released: 2005
- Recorded: 1996 (Sangenjaya); 2004 (London)
- Genre: Rock
- Length: 3:59
- Label: V2
- Songwriters: Kylie Minogue; Towa Tei
- Producer: Towa Tei

Music video
- "Sometime Samurai" on YouTube

"Sometime Samurai" is a song by Japanese music producer Towa Tei featuring vocals by Australian singer Kylie Minogue for Tei's fifth studio album, Flash (2005). The song was originally recorded as an instrumental demo in 1996 for Minogue's album Impossible Princess (1997), alongside "GBI (German Bold Italic)". It remained unfinished for eight years until Minogue re-recorded her vocals in 2004 in London. Several Japanese musicians contributed to the making of the song, including singer-songwriter Chisato Moritaka on drums. In it, a rock song with elements of house music, Minogue sings about her then-boyfriend, French photographer Stéphane Sednaoui.

In 2005, "Sometime Samurai" was released in Japan as a promotional radio single, and was included in two EPs: Melody / Sometime Samurai and Fresher. It received a significant amount of airplay in Tokyo, becoming the year's 47th most-played song on the radio station J-Wave. An accompanying music video, directed by Daniel Gorrel, shows two graffiti artists riding on mopeds. The video was nominated for the MTV Video Music Awards Japan for Best Dance Video. Tei played the song during his promotional tour for Flash in Tokyo in 2005, before Minogue filmed an interlude video for the track during her KylieX2008 tour three years later.

== Background and recording ==
After releasing her 1994 self-titled album, Australian singer Kylie Minogue initiated a romantic relationship with French photographer Stéphane Sednaoui and embarked on a series of worldwide excursions with him in search of inspiration for her then-upcoming record. The couple often traveled to Japan and were heavily interested in anime and Japanese culture. Towa Tei, who had delved into lounge music with his previous album Future Listening! (1994), aimed to return to his dance music origins for his next project. In 1996, while at his home studio in Sangenjaya, Tei received a handwritten fax from Minogue that contained a picture along with a message: "Music with you! Kylie. Call Me." The producer was interested in working with her and aware of her broad appeal to both Japanese and Western audiences.

Minogue visited Tei's project studio in Sangenjaya, where she participated in writing lyrics to his instrumental demos. "She could instantly understand my ideas and direction," Tei recalled. During their collaborative sessions, Minogue recorded two songs for her album with Tei: "GBI (German Bold Italic)" and "Sometime Samurai". Despite the smooth collaboration process between Minogue and Tei, the producer felt that their staff was not supportive of their work. Deconstruction Records eventually decided to not include those tracks on Minogue's sixth studio album, Impossible Princess (1997). Instead, Tei included "GBI (German Bold Italic)" on his 1997 studio album, Sound Museum. It was released as a single between 1997 and 1998, reaching the top 60 in Australia, Scotland and the UK.

"Sometime Samurai" remained unfinished for eight years until Tei was working on his fifth studio album, titled Flash, in late 2003. He recalled the track and how Minogue had a special fondness for it during the creation process. The producer sent an email to Minogue expressing his intention to include it in his then-upcoming album, to which she replied, "I can't forget that song. I can sing it even better now. Will you come to London?" Tei subsequently went to London in 2004 and recorded the track with the singer for around three hours. He enjoyed the brief session and found her singing had improved since the original recording, saying that the result exceeded the 1996 demo. "I guess 1997 was too early to release it for us, but I hope the world is ready for it now!", Tei said. "Sometime Samurai" was the first track completed for Flash, which was released in April 2005.

== Production and composition ==
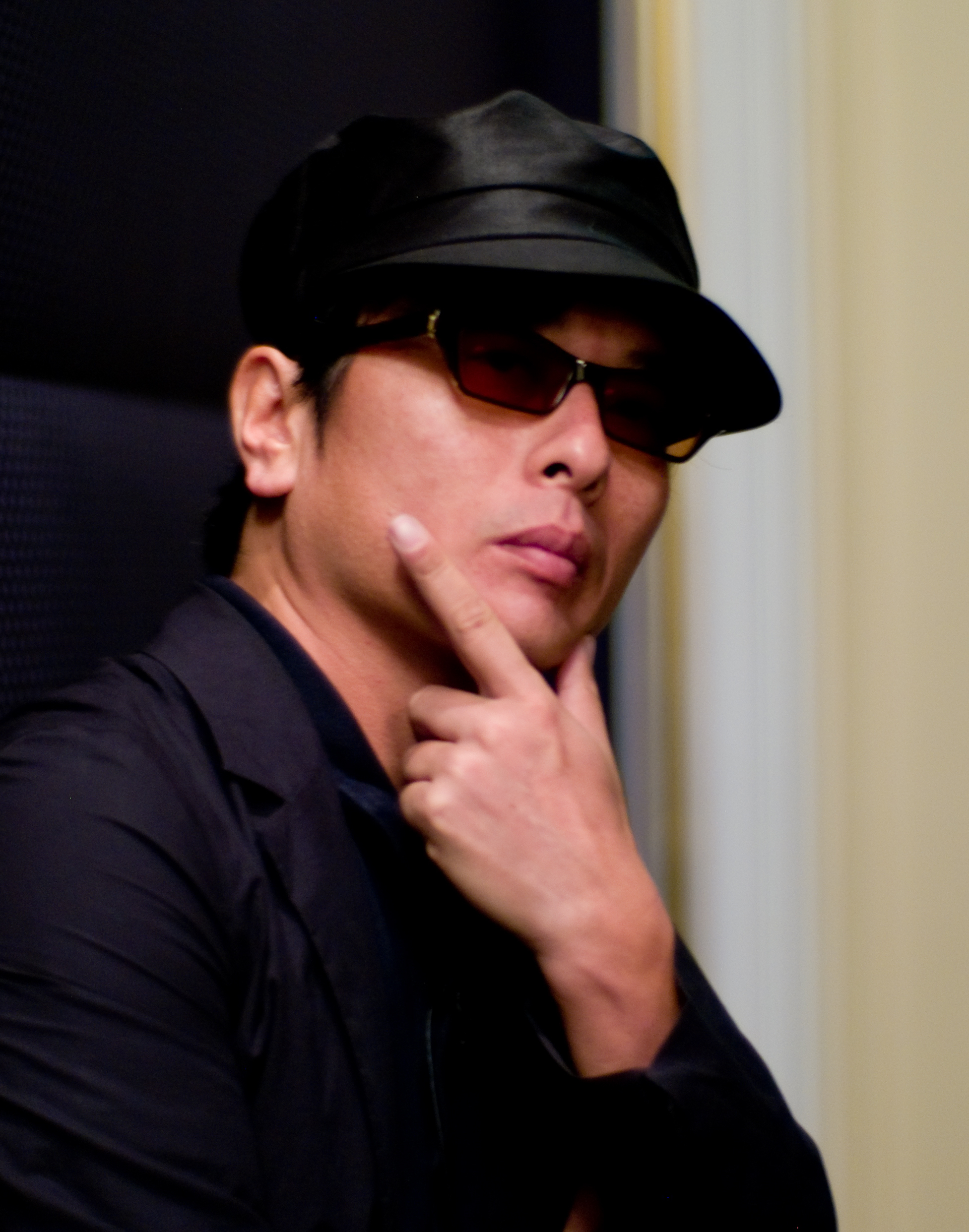
After co-writing "Sometime Samurai" with Minogue in 1997, Tei (pictured in 2007) re-recorded the track with her in 2004 for his 2005 album, Flash.

Musically, "Sometime Samurai" is a rock song with elements of house music. It is composed in the key of D minor and has a tempo of 118 beats per minute. The track incorporates electric guitars, four-on-the-floor house beats and elastic sitars. During Minogue's microphone test, the producer captured her introducing herself in Japanese, saying "ワタシノナマエハカイリーデス" ("My name is Kylie"). The brief recording was included in the song intro. Tei referred to the track as a product from the "Nu 'Japanese Curry' Wave era", highlighting its unique musical style that he and Minogue had not explored before. "Sometime Samurai" and Tei's version of the Knack's "My Sharona" (1979) marked the first inclusion of rock-influenced tracks in his solo album. The producer believed that these two songs served as the centerpiece of Flash, influencing the overall tone and impact of the other album tracks.

During the production of "Sometime Samurai", Tei contemplated the diverse subgenres of rock music and invited several renowned Japanese musicians to participate in making the track. Among them were singer-songwriter Chisato Moritaka, who played drums on the 1997 demo and Tei chose to retain her work for the final result. Having listened to her music, Tei believed that her involvement would facilitate the production process. Musician Hiroshi Takano and the Plastics' guitarist Hajime Tachibana contributed electric guitars, while Yumiko Ohno, a member of the Japanese rock band Buffalo Daughter, handled the bass and Moog synthesizer.

Minogue wrote the song about Sednaoui, referring to him as "the man of the moment" and comparing him to a samurai. (Note: In the album's liner notes, Sednaoui was credited as a samurai.) The lyrics convey Minogue's sense of admiration and protection from her lover. She refers to him as her Dreamtime with the lyrics "You are my Dreamtime / Wisely when you guide me / Lovely in your lights," alluding to an ancient period in Australian Aboriginals when ancestral figures inhabited the land. In Love, Kylie or Metaphors of Love in the Lyrics of Kylie Minogue (2015), Janne Harpela suggests that the Dreamtime reference signifies Minogue's lover as a guiding force who helps reshape the foundations of her world. Harpela also found the love portrayed in the song extends beyond the sexual ("eros") context and encompasses themes of familial love ("storge") and potentially religious love ("agape"). (Note: Harpela uses C. S. Lewis's The Four Loves (1960) as one of the references to define different types of love: "eros" (romantic and sexual love), "storge" (family love), "philia" (friendship love), "agape" (religious love).) In the photobook Kylie: La La La (2002), fashion designer William Baker draws a comparison between the track and "Cowboy Style" (1997) from Impossible Princess. Baker observes that both songs incorporate Eastern religious elements to depict Sednaoui, suggesting his significant influence on Minogue. (Note: In his interpretation, Baker views the lline "From the temple, won't you stay a while" from "Cowboy Style" as Minogue depicting her lover as "an urban Buddhist punk".) He further suggested that the lyrics hint at a teacher-disciple connection, symbolizing a transformative journey that Minogue experienced during the relationship.

== Release and promotion ==
"Sometime Samurai" was released as a promotional radio single in Japan in 2005. Additionally, the track was featured in a 12-inch EP, titled Melody / Sometime Samurai, which was released in June and limited to 100 copies. The EP also included three other tracks from Flash: "Melody", "Risk Some Soul" and "Red Card Jumbo". In November 2005, remixes of "Sometime Samurai" by DJs Uwe Schmidt (credited as Don Atom) and Aydin Hasirci (credited as ATFC) were included in another remix EP called Fresher, which was an extension of Tei's album Fresh. Tei later included "Sometime Samurai" in his 2014 compilation album, 94-14. Although he considered including "GBI (German Bold Italic)" in 94-14 as well, he ultimately decided that one song with Minogue was sufficient.

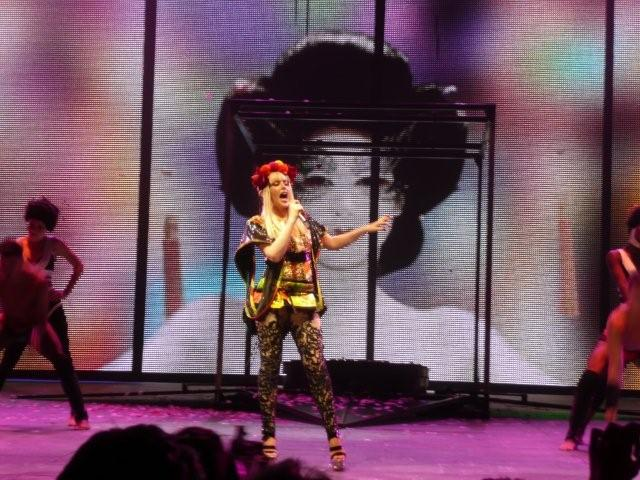
Minogue filmed an interlude of "Sometime Samurai" for her KylieX2008 tour (pictured in 2008).

Simon Sheridan, the author of The Complete Kylie (2009), feels that the track is more accessible than "GBI (German Bold Italic)". Writing for Metropolis, Dan Grunebaum commented that Minogue delivered an agile vocal performance on the "kitschy" track. "Sometime Samurai" received a significant amount of airplay on J-Wave, a Tokyo-based commercial radio station, from February to May 2005. (Note: "Sometime Samurai" placed within the Tokio Hot 100 chart, which tallies the most-played songs on J-Wave, from the week of 27 February to 22 May. The track peaked at number six during the week of April 17.) By the end of 2005, it was the station's 47th most-played song of the year.

The song's music video, directed by Daniel Gorrel and edited by Evan Andrews, shows two graffiti artists riding on mopeds. Minogue does not appear in the video, which has several scenes filmed in black and white. It was nominated for Best Dance Video at the 2006 MTV Video Music Awards Japan, marking Minogue's third nomination in the category. (Note: Minogue was previously nominated for "Come into My World" in 2003 and "Slow" in 2004.) The award ultimately went to Gorillaz's "Feel Good Inc." (2005). In 2014, Tei released the music video on his YouTube account as part of his 94-14 releases. Several songs from Flash, including "Sometime Samurai", gained significant exposure through prominent Japanese TV commercials in 2005. The track was used for a commercial celebrating the 80th Anniversary of Kewpie, a popular Japanese brand of mayonnaise. The commercial features a giant Kewpie doll appearing in a skyscraper. Tei shared his perspective on the advertising strategies, stating, "That's what Flash is all about. Commercials are all about catching people's attention in a short amount of time. And there's a client involved. By being involved in that kind of work, I trained muscles that I hadn't used before... I would like to communicate in various ways."

Tei played "Sometime Samurai" during his promotional tour for Flash in Tokyo, starting from 1 April to 12 June 2005. Three years later, Minogue filmed an interlude video for her KylieX2008 tour, in which she performed "Sometime Samurai". For the interlude, she donned a vibrant pink kimono created by Jean Paul Gaultier, a voluminous blonde wig and porcelain-inspired makeup characterized by a white foundation, dramatic eyeliner and pink eyeshadow. A promotional picture taken from the shoot was released earlier to promote the tour. Writers of News.com.au and China Daily observed the similarity of her appearance to the music video of "GBI (German Bold Italic)" and remarked on the "classic geisha material" look. The interlude was part of the Japanese-inspired segment called "Naughty Manga Girl" in KylieX2008, during which Minogue performed in a kimono-style short dress. A show at the O2 Arena in London was filmed for television broadcast and later released commercially in 2008, also titled KylieX2008.

== Formats and track listings ==
- Japanese promotional CD single
1. "Sometime Samurai" (Radio edit) – 3:39
- Melody / Sometime Samurai 12-inch EP
1. "Melody" – 6:13
2. "Melodypella" – 2:24
3. "Risk Some Soul" – 4:33
4. "Sometime Samurai" – 3:58
5. "Red Card Jumbo" – 0:44

== Credits and personnel ==
Credits adapted from the liner notes of Flash:

- Towa Tei – songwriting, production, arrangement, editor
- Kylie Minogue – vocals, songwriting
- Hiroshi Takano – electric guitars
- Hajime Tachibana – electric guitars
- Yumiko Ohno – bass and Moog synthesizer
- Chisato Moritaka – drums
- Stéphane Sednaoui – a samurai
- Tadashi Matsuda – mixing engineer
