= GBI (German Bold Italic) =

1997 single by Towa Tei, Kylie Minogue and Haruomi Hosono

- UK CD1 single cover

Single by Towa Tei featuring Kylie Minogue and Haruomi Hosono (Note: Hosono and Minogue have been credited as feature artists since the Japanese release in 1997. However, only Tei's name was imprinted on the single cover. The 1998 releases in Australia and the UK listed Minogue as a featured artist on the cover; Hosono was only mentioned on the liner notes. The album booklet of Sound Museum listed both as feature artists.)

from the album Sound Museum
- Released: September 10, 1997
- Recorded: 1996
- Genre: House; techno-pop; club
- Length: 6:59
- Label: Elektra; Arthrob; Akashic; East West
- Songwriters: Towa Tei; Kylie Minogue
- Producer: Towa Tei

Towa Tei singles chronology
"Happy" (1997)	"GBI (German Bold Italic)" (1997)	"Private Eyes" (1997)

Kylie Minogue singles chronology
"Some Kind of Bliss" (1997)	"GBI (German Bold Italic)" (1997)	"Did It Again" (1997)

Music video
- "GBI (German Bold Italic)" on YouTube

"GBI (German Bold Italic)" is a song by Japanese music producer Towa Tei from his second studio album Sound Museum (1997). The song features vocals by Australian singer Kylie Minogue and Japanese musician Haruomi Hosono. Tei produced the song and co-wrote it with Minogue. It was released as a single in Japan by Elektra, Akashic, and East West Records on September 10, 1997, featuring several remixes and an original typeface designed by Hiro Sugiyama and the design team Enlightenment. A year later, Arthrob and East West Records distributed the single in Australia and the United Kingdom.

The minimal house, techno-pop and club song contains an uncredited sample from the introduction track of The Art of Belly Dancing, a 1969 belly dancing instructional record. It portrays Minogue as a newly invented typeface titled "German Bold Italic". Music critics lauded the tongue-in-cheek song for its distinctiveness in Minogue's repertoire, regarding it as a highlight of Sound Museum and a defining moment in her career. "GBI (German Bold Italic)" had little success on the singles charts, peaking within the top 60 in Australia, Scotland, and the UK.

Minogue's then-boyfriend, French director Stéphane Sednaoui, directed the song's accompanying music video. The video features Minogue dressed in a kimono and Tei walking through the streets of New York City and Tokyo. Minogue incorporated the track in her KylieFever2002 tour and made several live performances where she wore traditional Japanese costumes. Tei re-produced the track in 2017 and released another song with Minogue, titled "Sometime Samurai", in 2005.

== Background and production ==
Japanese record producer Towa Tei left the New York-based music group Deee-Lite in 1994 after suffering an injury on stage. He returned to Tokyo and did production work for various artists, including music groups A Tribe Called Quest and Yellow Magic Orchestra. He released his debut solo studio album, Future Listening! (1994), under For Life Music. A mix of bossa nova and electronic tunes, the album was well-received and aided Tei's rise to fame in Japan. That year, Australian singer Kylie Minogue released her self-titled album to moderate commercial success. The R&B-influenced album was her first offering with the independent label Deconstruction Records, following her split with PWL two years earlier.

Shortly after releasing the album, Minogue began a romantic relationship with French photographer Stéphane Sednaoui and went on a series of worldwide trips with him, including many trips to Japan, to gain inspiration for her upcoming record. Tei, who was into lounge music after finishing Future Listening!, wanted to return to his dance roots on his next record. In 1996, Tei received a hand-written fax from Minogue at his home studio in Sangenjaya. He recalled the fax had a picture on it, with a message: "Music with you! Kylie. Call Me". The producer was interested in working with her, whom he called "the ideal icon that appeals to both Japanese and Western people." He was aware of Minogue's intention to break away from the previous Eurobeat material with PWL and her impact on the club scene, particularly among the gay community.

Minogue came to Tei's project studio in Sangenjaya and wrote the lyrics to his instrumental demos. "She could instantly understand my ideas and direction," Tei recalled. During their sessions, Minogue recorded two songs for her album with Tei: "GBI (German Bold Italic)" and "Sometime Samurai". The producer felt that although the collaboration was smooth, their staff was not supportive. Those tracks were ultimately left out of Impossible Princess (1997), Minogue's sixth studio album. Tei then saved "GBI (German Bold Italic)" for his second studio album Sound Museum (1997). Fernando Aponte mixed the audio at Chung King Studios, New York. Japanese producers Hideki Matsutake and Takeshi Fujii conducted additional synthesizer control.

== Composition ==
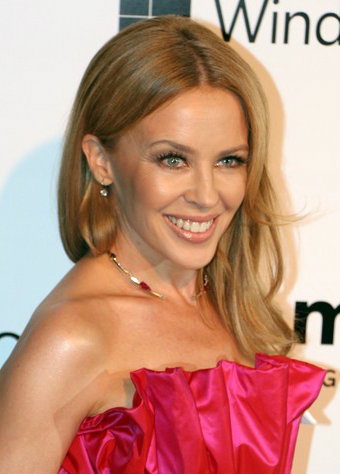
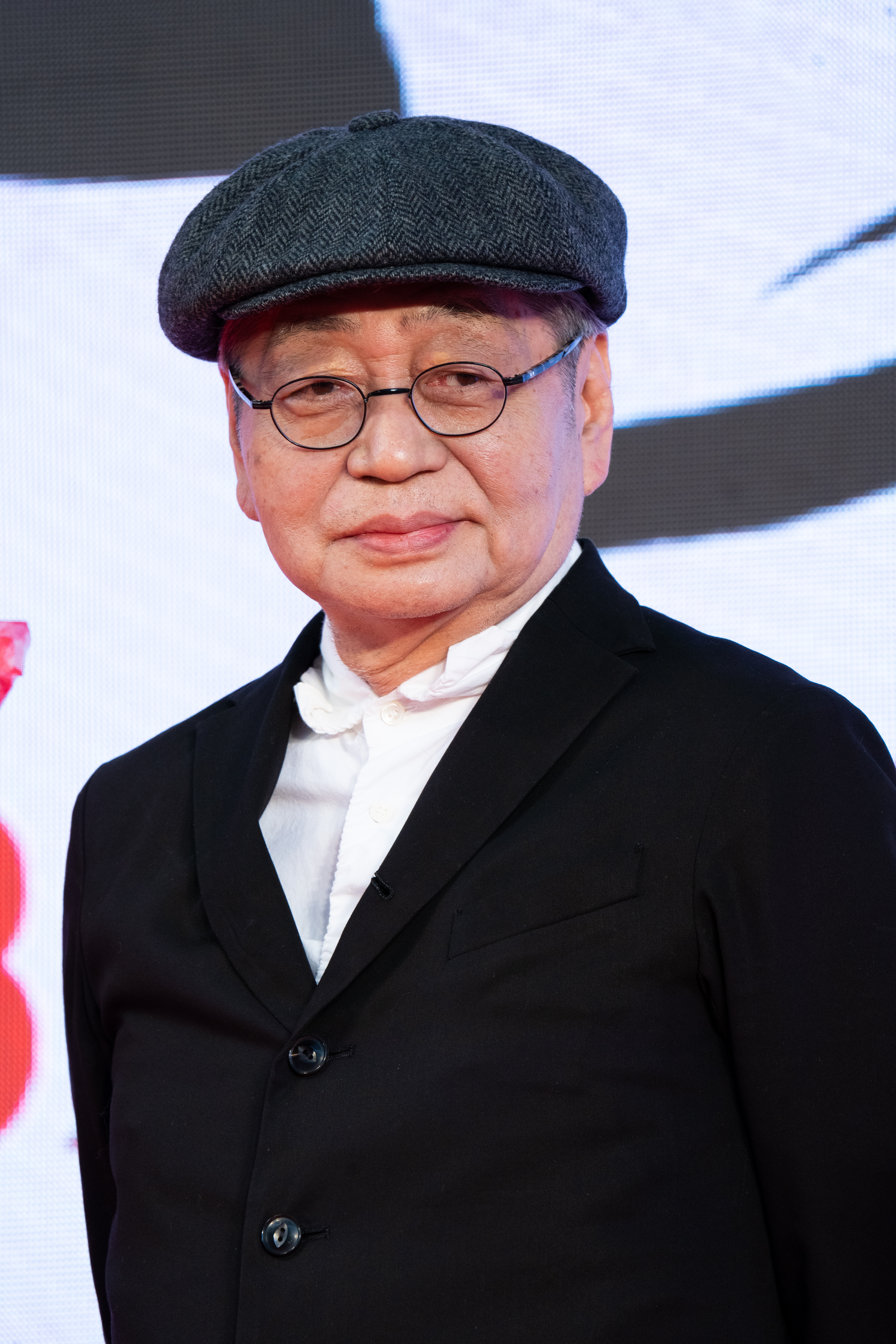
Minogue (left, pictured in 2015) and Hosono (right, pictured in 2019) are the featured artists in "GBI (German Bold Italic)".

"GBI (German Bold Italic)" is a house, techno-pop and club track with minimal production. The song is written in the key of B♭ minor and has a tempo of 127 beats per minute. Its production draws influence from supermarket muzak and J-pop, featuring retro drum machines, quirky riffs, jazz beats, bouncy synths, and drone sound effect. Building around the four-on-the-floor rhythm, the track was compared to the work of German band Kraftwerk and Japanese band Pizzicato Five by music critics. Simon Sheridan, the author of The Complete Kylie (2009), wrote the track is filled with random "blips, bumps, and scratches" and referred to it as an aural cartoon. In Words and Music: A History of Pop in the Shape of a City (2003), English journalist Paul Morley called it a hybrid of "hip-happy techno and post-fashionable experimental absurdism". "GBI (German Bold Italic)" opens with an uncredited sample from the introduction track of The Art of Belly Dancing, a 1969 belly dancing instructional record by Bel-Sha-Zaar, Tommy Genapopoluis, and The Grecian Knights. The same sample was used on Deee-Lite's 1990 hit single "Groove Is in the Heart", co-produced by Tei.

Lyrically, the tongue-in-cheek song sees Minogue playing the part of a newly invented typeface named "German Bold Italic". She introduces the font's attributes: it fits well and looks good with a variety of colors, including red, green, and blue. She offers to assist the listener in crafting their own bold design, assuring them that they will appreciate her sense of style. At one point, Minogue repeats the German words "Gut ja!" ("Yeah good!"). Music critics deemed "GBI (German Bold Italic)" to be the first ode to a specific typeface. Morley compared the bizarre premise to Alvin Lucier's 1969 sound art piece I Am Sitting in a Room. According to Yoko Kawaguchi, the author of Butterfly's Sisters: The Geisha in Western Culture (2010), the decorative font effects are analogous to a woman's allure. Minogue seductively talks and giggles throughout the song. Tei described her performance as an "expressive poetry reading" and cited it as one of the things he liked best about Sound Museum. John Rowley, writing for Junkee, defined her delivery as "flirtatious, giggly, and self-assured". Besides Minogue, Japanese producer Haruomi Hosono is also credited as a featured artist, contributing his vocals to the track. In contrast to Minogue's eloquent performance, Hosono performed a softer background vocal delivery, as requested by Tei.

== Release and remixes ==
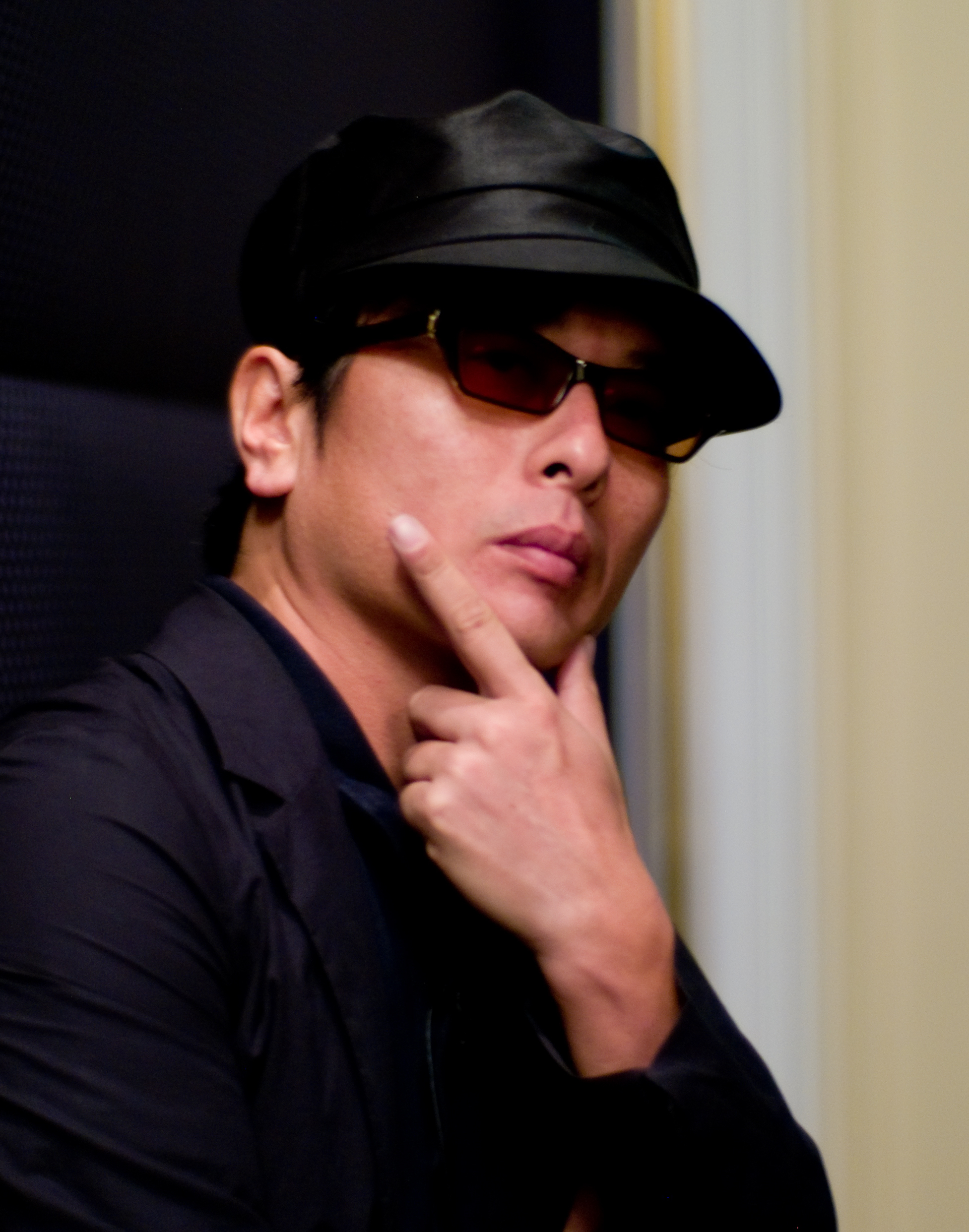
Twenty years after its initial release, Tei (pictured in 2007) re-produced "GBI (German Bold Italic)" for his album EMO (2017).

"GBI (German Bold Italic)" was released in Japan as a CD maxi single on 10 September 1997 under Elektra, Akashic, and East West Records. (Note: Tei switched record labels in 1997, moving from Güt Records (distributed by For Life Music) to East West Records (distributed by Warner Music Japan). The label that Tei had signed with since his Deee-Lite days, Elektra Records, would continue to distribute his work outside of Japan.) The cover art depicts a mini pixel art portrait of Minogue. The single features bonus CD-ROM programming including a screensaver, the original German Bold Italic font, and sound bites from the song. Hiro Sugiyama and his design group Enlightenment designed the font, which was made available for download on both Tei's and Minogue's official websites. The single includes a brief intro produced by American band The Gentle People, as well as remixes by English DJs Krust (credited as Rekut) and Shy FX (the Ebony Boogie Down Mix). A remix of "BMT", an original track featuring American rappers Biz Markie and Mos Def, was also included. The Japanese double 12-inch single, released in October, displays the song title and Tei's website in the original German Bold Italic font on the front cover, with a specimen of the font on the back cover. The vinyl also includes an original song penned by Tei named "Boldline".

In October and November 1998, one year after its initial release in Japan, "GBI (German Bold Italic)" was issued in Australia and the United Kingdom. In both regions, a sticker was added to the cover featuring Minogue as the featured artist. The cover art for these 1998 releases was similar to that of the Japanese 12-inch single, featuring the title and Tei's website printed against different colored backgrounds. In the UK, the song was initially scheduled to be released on October 5 by Coalition Records. A cassette single and two CD versions were eventually issued on October 26 under the EastWest and Arthrob labels.

The track appeared in Tei's 1997 album Sound Museum, where the font was included for installation on the enhanced CD version. Two remixes of the track made their appearances on Tei's Japanese remix album Stupid Fresh (1997): the Krust remix and a Latin Narrow Light mix by German producer Uwe Schmidt (credited under his alias "Lisa Carbon"). A year later, the remix album was released as the second disc to Sound Museum in Europe. The track was subsequently included in Tei's first compilation album, titled Best, in 2001. 20 years after its initial release, Tei re-produced the track for his 2017 studio album, EMO. The updated version, re-titled as "GBI", stripped off the four-on-the-floor rhythm, which Tei admitted was one of his big pillars when he recorded the original version but has since distanced from it. The producer kept most of Minogue's original vocals, increased Hosono's vocals volume and added the guitar performance by suGar Yoshinaga, the guitarist from the Japanese rock band Buffalo Daughter. He felt revisiting the track was exciting and emotional. A remix of "GBI" by Japanese DJ Takkyu Ishino was made available as a bonus CD-R with the purchase of EMO through Amazon. Ishino included the remix in his 2018 complication album Takkyu Ishino Works 1983-2017.

== Reception ==
Music critics remarked on the distinctive nature of "GBI (German Bold Italic)". The Independent's Fiona Sturges thought the track has a "significantly more exotic flavour" than Tei's typical club tracks. Sheridan described it as "a witches' brew of hypnotic Japanese madness, but fabulous fun nonetheless." Several critics picked the track as a highlight of Sound Museum. John Everson of Southtown Star called it the album's "only real catchy moment", while Howard Cohen, writing for Miami Herald, found that Tei's rhythmic texture and Minogue's vocals keep the album danceable. Thomas Conner of The Tulsa World and Aidin Vaziri of San Francisco Examiner viewed the track as a demonstration of Sound Museum's unique and captivating blend of different cultures. In Kylie Song by Song (2022), Marc Andrews commented that the Shy FX and Krust remixes showcased Minogue's most stylish set of remixes, and the Sharp Boys Dub extended the connection with the original track even further.

In their retrospective reviews, music critics considered the track to be one of Minogue's career-defining moments. Cameron Adams from Herald Sun, Priya Elan from NME, and Alistair Powell of Classic Pop listed it among her oddest and most fascinating collaborations. Adams ranked "GBI (German Bold Italic)" among her best tracks, praising its hysterical yet charming production. Sheridan believed the unconventional track signaled the conclusion of Minogue's bold phase of experimenting with various musical styles, which was followed by a string of more mainstream projects throughout the rest of 1998. Sean Smith, the writer of Kylie (2014), pointed out that by the time of the single's release, Minogue had already moved on artistically. Writing in his book Playlisted: Everything You Need to Know About Australian Music Right Now (2012), Australian journalist Craig Mathieson claimed that the track was a captivating precursor of the direction her music was about to take. Sharing the same sentiment, Rowley considered "GBI (German Bold Italic)" to be one of Minogue's most innovative dance tracks, as it established a sonic foundation for what would eventually become her unique style of house-pop.

Due to lack of promotion, "GBI (German Bold Italic)" had little success on the single charts worldwide. In 1998, it peaked at number 50 in Australia, number 67 in Scotland, and number 63 in the UK. The Sharp Boys Deee-Liteful Dub peaked at number 18 on the UK Music Week's Club Chart, while the original track reached number 35 on the Pop Chart in October. Despite being one of Minogue's most obscure singles, the track became a favorite among fans. Scottish DJ Calvin Harris chose it as his favorite track from Minogue, while Irish singer Róisín Murphy ranked it among her favourite dance music collaborations.

== Music video ==
=== Production and synopsis ===
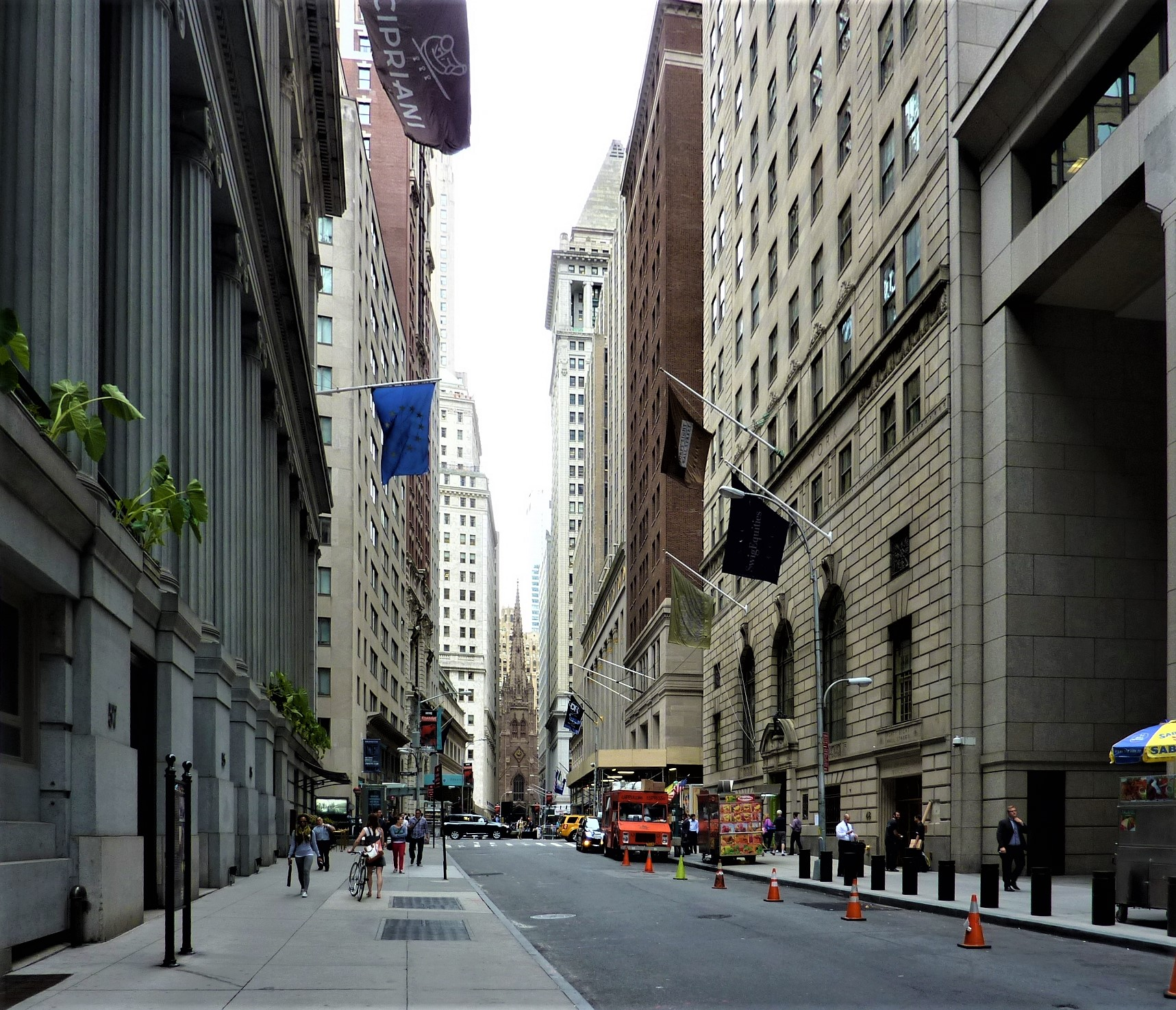
Sednaoui partly shot the music video in Wall Street, New York City (pictured in 2013), using a hand-held camera.

The music video for "GBI (German Bold Italic)" was directed by Sednaoui, who was Minogue's boyfriend at the time. The couple often traveled to Japan and were heavily interested in anime and Japanese culture. Minogue was drawn into the erotic and feminine work of Japanese photographer Nobuyoshi Araki, which influenced her promotional photographs taken by Sednaoui for her album Impossible Princess. Their fascination with geisha imagery was further fueled by Arthur Golden's 1997 popular novel Memoirs of a Geisha. Sednaoui previously directed the 1994 music video for English group Massive Attack's "Sly", in which Scottish singer-songwriter Nicolette walking down the streets in a kimono costume.

The low-budget video was partly shot in Wall Street, New York City, during the winter, using a handheld digital camera. Minogue and fashion designer William Baker selected an authentic kimono and obi at a small store in Greenwich Village, as well as a pink rubber whip from a sex shop. (Note: Baker revealed that the same whip later appeared in Geri Halliwell's 2000 music video for "Bag It Up".) The singer also wore lacquered green Japanese platform shoes gifted by Sednaoui. Minogue felt the video was authentic but the costume and heavy wig were quite a challenge for her to wear. Her garish make-up was handled by artist Paul Starr.

The video opens with Minogue in a bubble bath, wearing a red bikini and singing the refrain: "You will like my sense of style." She dons a large silver-hued wig, adorned with sparkling spangles and pins topped with figures of flying cranes. In the following scene, she is seen exploring the streets of New York, dressed in a vibrant kimono with flowing furisode sleeves and a meticulously tied obi. She occasionally pauses to strike angular Japanese poses with her hands, and bows respectfully to random strangers. The video then alternates with scenes of Tei wandering through the crowded streets of Tokyo, wearing a pair of sunglasses and large headphones. He participated in various activities such as eating noodles, visiting a fish market, and buying a drink from a vending machine.

The camera subsequently shifts its focus to Minogue and Tei's feet as they navigate the subways in their respective cities. Minogue can be seen striking poses, lounging on luxurious red silk bed sheets, and delivering her lines in front of a stylized pine tree painting. As the video reaches its climax, Minogue is depicted being led on a leash by a Japanese man dressed in a business suit. Meanwhile, Tei is shown sitting primly on a hotel bed accompanied by two young Japanese women who gradually undress, lean on his shoulders, and whisper in his ears. Tei breaks into laughter as the video concludes.

=== Reception and analysis ===
The music video has never been commercially released. In August 2014, Tei uploaded the video on his YouTube account as part of his 94-14 releases. Journalists and authors recognized the video as one of Minogue's most unconventional endeavors. In his essay Integrated and Intersected: Kylie Minogue, Baz Luhrmann and the use of popular song material in Moulin Rouge! (2013), Philip Hayward described it as the "most extreme audio-visual distance" from her role in Neighbours in the 1980s and her earlier music output. Andrews called it a "mind-boggling Japanese surrealist live anime fest," while Sheridan described Minogue's character as "hyper-unreal". Mathieson praised her performance as the pinnacle of her acting career, and Sturges appreciated her charming presence.

In the photobook Kylie: La La La (2002), Baker characterized Minogue's role as a deranged cyber creature that blends elements of traditional geisha and New Romantic style. The video is based on Sednaoui's perception of Minogue as a blend of geisha and manga superheroine, representing two contrasting Japanese portrayals of femininity. However, she is masked and confined by the invisible constraints of her celebrity life. Scholars have offered several interpretations of the music video. Kawaguchi and Keaveney viewed Minogue's character as a depersonalized sex doll in a kimono, which exaggerates the sexualized Western stereotype of the geisha, confines them within the realm of the male imagination, and symbolizes the sexual objectification of Minogue as a pop star. Kawaguchi also noted a reversal of Western sexual stereotypes: a Western woman embodies the fantasy of being an Eastern sexual object, while the young Japanese woman takes on the role of an alluring office siren. Tony Mitchell, writing in Alter/Asians : Asian-Australian Identities in Art, Media and Popular Culture (2000), viewed the fictional font as a metaphor for the unique hybrid of the German and Caucasian Japanese-Australian persona which Minogue had adopted in the video.

Scholars have commented on Minogue's appearance in the video. Kawaguchi observed that her attire did not adhere to the typical style associated with real geishas, and her extravagant wig created a resemblance to a fusion of two theatre characters: Madame Butterfly, a young Japanese woman from a 1904 opera by Giacomo Puccini, and the sexual Marschallin in Richard Strauss' 1911 opera Der Rosenkavalier. Mitchell pointed out that even though Minogue portrayed a geisha, her use of rouge makeup and a blonde wig still accentuated her Western features. He also drew a comparison between her appearance and that of onnagata, male actors who traditionally take on female roles in theater. He suggested that Minogue relinquishes her status as a gay icon by adopting "transvestite-like representation which crosses borders of both race and gender."

Authors have drawn comparisons between the video's depiction of Japanese culture and the work of other artists. Kawaguchi and Keaveney compared the video to American singer Madonna's "Nothing Really Matters" (1999), in which she also dressed in a kimono. Both of the authors suggested that Minogue and Madonna's choice to adopt geisha attire and mannerisms raised delicate questions about Asian representation in entertainment and cultural appropriation. They also noted that by the end of each video, Madonna and Tei are seen having a laugh to the camera, suggesting that the geisha depiction is presented as a form of playacting and satire. Keaveney opined that their portrayal is "emancipated and empowered at the expense of the Asian woman who remains silent, bound, and deranged." Mitchell pointed out that the use of the Tokyo subway and Japanese iconography in the music video of "GBI (German Bold Italic)" have influenced the visual work of American hip-hop group Beastie Boys' "Intergalactic" (1998) and Australian electronic duo B(if)tek's "Japanese Game Show" (2000). Smith perceived the video as a catalyst for future artists like Lady Gaga and a testament to Minogue's trailblazing contributions.

== Aftermath ==
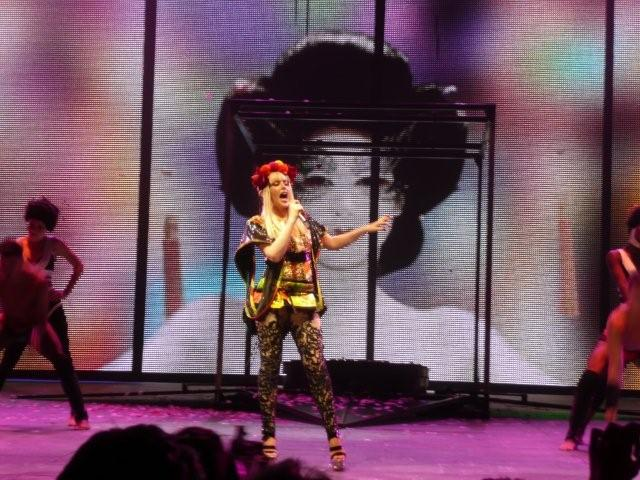
Minogue performing in a kimono-style short dress during the "Naughty Manga Girl" act of her KylieX2008 tour

Following the release of "GBI (German Bold Italic)", Minogue has made several live performances in Australia where she wore traditional Japanese costumes. She wore a blue and white silk kimono, and a geisha-inspired brown wig designed by hairdresser Kevin Murphy, while performing a medley performance at the 25th Anniversary of Mushroom Records concert at the Melbourne Cricket Ground on November 14, 1998. The performance later appeared on a live album titled Mushroom 25 Live (1998). Minogue filmed an interlude for her KylieX2008 tour wearing a bright pink kimono designed by Jean Paul Gaultier, with a large blonde wig and porcelain makeup. The interlude was part of the Japanese-inspired segment called "Naughty Manga Girl" in KylieX2008, during which Minogue performed in a kimono-style short dress, accompanied by dancers brandishing swords and a nude Japanese woman appearing on the screen.

Minogue incorporated "GBI (German Bold Italic)" into her KylieFever2002 tour as a video interlude, playing while she temporarily left the stage and dancers took the forefront. Tei was pleased with her decision to include the track in the tour, and Blu-ray.com praised it as one of the most impressive segments. A show in Manchester was filmed on May 4, 2002, and released on DVD titled KylieFever2002: Live in Manchester. In 2005, Tei released "Sometime Samurai" as a promotional radio single from his 2005 studio album, Flash. The track was initially recorded as a demo alongside "GBI (German Bold Italic)" in 1996 but remained unfinished for eight years until Minogue had the opportunity to re-record her vocals in 2004. In 2015, American artist Cory Arcangel utilized the original German Bold Italic font for a merchandising sweatshirt of the American indie pop group Wet. In an interview with The Fader, Arcangel described the font as a "sick classic vector techno font" that had become quite rare over the years. He had a fondness for the font since its release in 1997 and had previously incorporated it into his artworks, including drawings showcased at his 2011 exhibition at the Whitney Museum of American Art. Sugiyama and his design group Enlightenment, who designed the font for the 1997 single cover, released a lyric video of the track in 2013. The footage was screened at the Media Ambition Tokyo exhibition on February 15 at Roppongi Hills.

== Formats and track listings ==
- UK CD single #1
1. "GBI" (radio edit) – 3:31
2. "GBI" (The Sharp Boys Deee-Liteful dub) – 8:58
3. "Boldline" – 2:40
- UK CD single #2
1. "GBI" (radio edit) – 3:31
2. "GBI" (Rekut) – 8:15
3. "GBI" (Ebony Boogie Down mix) – 5:14
- UK cassette single
1. "GBI" (radio edit) – 3:31
2. "GBI" – 6:58
- UK 12-inch promotional single #1
1. "GBI" (The Sharp Boys' Deee-Liteful dub) – 8:58
2. "GBI" – 6:57
3. "GBI" (Kylie-Pella) – 1:40
- UK 12-inch promotional single #2
1. "GBI" (Rekut) – 8:18
2. "GBI" (Ebony Boogie Down mix) – 5:14
3. "Bold Line" – 2:40
- Australian and Japanese CD single
1. "Intro" – 0:26
2. "GBI" (radio edit) – 4:17
3. "GBI" (Ebony Boogie Down mix) – 5:14
4. "BMT" (SP-1200 remix) – 4:23
5. "GBI" (Rekut) – 8:15
6. "GBI" (German Bold Light mix) – 2:49
- Japanese double 12-inch single
1. "GBI" (radio edit) – 4:17
2. "GBI" (Kylie-pella) – 1:40
3. "BMT" (SP-1200 remix) – 4:23
4. "Boldline" – 2:40
5. "GBI" (Ebony Boogie Down mix) – 5:14
6. "GBI" (Rekut) – 8:15
- Japanese Takkyu Ishino Remix
1. "GBI" (Takkyu Ishino remix dub) – 6:53
2. "GBI" (Takkyu Ishino remix instrumental) – 6:53

== Personnel ==
Personnel are adapted from the 1998 CD single liner notes.

- Towa Tei – songwriting, production, arrangement, editor, drum and keyboard programing, art director
- Kylie Minogue – vocals, songwriting
- Haruomi Hosono – vocals
- Hideki Matsutake – additional synthesizer manipulations
- Takeshi Fujii – additional synthesizer manipulations
- Fernando Aponte – mixing engineer
- Bobby Hata – mastering engineer
- Tycoon Graphics for Graphickers – art director, designer
- Hiro Sugiyama (Enlightenment) – icon illustrator

Additional credits are taken from Tei's 2017 studio album EMO, where the track is re-titled as "GBI":

- suGar Yoshinaga – guitar
- Towa Tei – songwriting, keyboards, drum programming
- Yoshinori Sunahara – additional programming

== Charts ==
Weekly chart performance for "GBI (German Bold Italic)" in 1998
Chart (1998)	Peak position
Australia (ARIA)	50
Scotland (OCC)	67
UK Singles (OCC)	63
UK Club (Music Week) The Sharp Boys Deee-Liteful Dub	18
UK Pop (Music Week)	35

== Release history ==
Release dates, formats, and labels for "GBI (German Bold Italic)"
Region	Date	Format	Label	Ref.
Japan	September 10, 1997	CD maxi single	Elektra; Akashic; East West	
Japan	October 1997	Double 12-inch single	Elektra	
Australia	November 16, 1998	CD single	East West	
United Kingdom	October 26, 1998	CD single	Arthrob; East West	
United Kingdom	1998	Cassette single	Arthrob; East West	
United Kingdom	1998	12-inch single	Arthrob	
Japan	March 22, 2017	CD-R	Mach	

== See also ==
- Jokerman (typeface), a typeface named after a song
