= MTV Video Music Award Japan for Best Dance Video =

Annual Japanese music award

Best Dance Video (最優秀ダンスビデオ賞)

== Results ==
The following table displays the nominees and the winners in bold print with a yellow background.

=== 2000s ===
Year	Artist	Video
**2002** (1st)	**The Chemical Brothers**	
**2002** (1st)	Basement Jaxx	
**2002** (1st)	Daft Punk	
**2002** (1st)	Fatboy Slim	
**2002** (1st)	Gorillaz	
**2003** (2nd)	**Supercar**	**"Yumegiwa Last Boy"**
**2003** (2nd)	Kylie Minogue	"Come Into My World"
**2003** (2nd)	Moby	"We Are All Made of Stars"
**2003** (2nd)	Sketch Show	"Turn Turn"
**2003** (2nd)	Underworld	"Two Months Off"
**2004** (3rd)	**BoA**	**"Double"**
**2004** (3rd)	Fire Ball	"Da Bala"
**2004** (3rd)	Kylie Minogue	"Slow"
**2004** (3rd)	Shinichi Osawa featuring Kj	"Shinin"
**2004** (3rd)	Sean Paul	"Get Busy"
**2006** (5th)	**Gorillaz**	**"Feel Good Inc."**
**2006** (5th)	Madonna	"Hung Up"
**2006** (5th)	M-Flo Loves Emyli and Diggy-Mo	"Dopamine"
**2006** (5th)	New Order	"Krafty"
**2006** (5th)	Towa Tei featuring Kylie Minogue	"Sometime Samurai"
**2007** (6th)	**DJ Ozma**	**"Age Age Every Night"**
**2007** (6th)	Fergie	"London Bridge"
**2007** (6th)	Gnarls Barkley	"Crazy"
**2007** (6th)	M-Flo Loves Minmi	"Lotta Love -M&M Mix-"
**2007** (6th)	Justin Timberlake	"SexyBack"
**2008** (7th)	**The Chemical Brothers**	**"Do It Again"**
**2008** (7th)	Denki Groove	"Shounen Young"
**2008** (7th)	Justice	"D.A.N.C.E."
**2008** (7th)	Shinichi Osawa	"Our Song (A Lonely Girl Ver.)"
**2008** (7th)	Ryukyudisko featuring Beat Crusaders	"Nice Day"
**2009** (8th)	**Towa Tei featuring Miho Hatori**	**"Mind Wall"**
**2009** (8th)	The Brighton Port Authority featuring David Byrne and Dizzee Rascal	"Toe Jam"
**2009** (8th)	Dan Le Sac vs Scroobius Pip	"Thou Shalt Always Kill" (汝、つねにキメるべし)
**2009** (8th)	Kraak & Smaak (featuring Ben Westbeech)	"Squeeze Me"
**2009** (8th)	Ukawanimation! featuring Takkyū Ishino and Kenichi Hagiwara	"Wakusei no Portrait 5 Okuman Gaso" (惑星のポートレイト 5億万画素)

=== 2010s ===
Year	Artist	Video
**2010** (9th)	**Lady Gaga**	**"Poker Face"**
**2010** (9th)	Cos/Mes	"Chaosexotica"
**2010** (9th)	David Guetta featuring Kelly Rowland	"When Love Takes Over"
**2010** (9th)	La Roux	"I'm Not Your Toy"
**2010** (9th)	Perfume	"One Room Disco" (ワンルーム･ディスコ)
**2011** (10th)	**Lady Gaga**	**"Born This Way"**
**2011** (10th)	Dorian	"Morning Calling"
**2011** (10th)	Mark Ronson & The Business Intl. featuring Q-Tip and MNDR	"Bang Bang Bang"
**2011** (10th)	The Backwoods	"Flying Bugz"
**2011** (10th)	Underworld	"Always Loved a Film"
**2012** (11th)	**Perfume**	**"Laser Beam" (レーザービーム)**
**2012** (11th)	David Guetta featuring Flo Rida and Nicki Minaj	"Where Them Girls At"
**2012** (11th)	James Blake	"Limit to Your Love"
**2012** (11th)	SBTRKT	"Pharaohs"
**2012** (11th)	Yakushimaruetsuko to D.V.D.	"Gurugle Earth"
**2013** (12th)	**Big Bang**	**"Fantastic Baby"**
**2013** (12th)	Group_inou	"9"
**2013** (12th)	Megumi Nakajima	"Transfer"
**2013** (12th)	Skrillex	"Bangarang"
**2013** (12th)	Zedd featuring Matthew Koma	"Spectrum"

== See also ==
- MTV Video Music Award for Best Dance Video
- MTV Europe Music Award for Best Dance
