= KylieFever2002: Live in Manchester =

2002 video by Kylie Minogue

KylieFever2002

Video by Kylie Minogue
- Released: 18 November 2002
- Recorded: 4 May 2002
- Venue: Manchester Arena (Manchester, England)
- Genre: Pop
- Length: 170:00
- Label: EMI
- Director: William Baker; Alan Macdonald
- Producer: Kylie Minogue; Bill Lord; Terry Blamey

Kylie Minogue video chronology
Intimate and Live (2002)	KylieFever2002 (2002)	Greatest Hits 87–97 (2003)

KylieFever2002 is the 2002 live DVD by Kylie Minogue, recorded at the Manchester Arena in Manchester, England, on 4 May 2002 during the KylieFever2002 concert tour. The DVD contains the full two-hour concert, a 30-minute behind-the-scenes documentary, live projections of the songs "Cowboy Style", "Light Years" / "I Feel Love", "I Should Be So Lucky", and "Burning Up", and a photo-gallery. A limited-edition version was also released, with different packaging and a bonus CD with highlights from the KylieFever2002 concert. KylieFever2002 reached No. 16 on U.S. Billboard's Top Music Video chart.

== Track listing ==
In Concert – Live in Manchester
No.	Title	Writer(s)	Length
1.	"Come into My World"	Rob Davis; Cathy Dennis	6:12
2.	"Shocked"	Mike Stock; Matt Aitken; Pete Waterman; Pauline Bennett	5:28
3.	"Love at First Sight"	Kylie Minogue; Richard Stannard; Julian Gallagher; Ash Howes; Martin Harrington	4:12
4.	"Fever"	Greg Fitzgerald; Tom Nichols	3:43
5.	"Spinning Around"	Ira Shickman; Osborne Bingham; Kara DioGuardi; Paula Abdul	5:05
6.	"The Crying Game" (Ballads section)	Geoff Stephens; Jimmy Harry; Stock; Waterman; Steve Anderson; Dave Seaman	8:56
7.	"GBI" (Video projection)	Minogue; Towa Tei	3:37
8.	"Confide in Me"	Anderson; Seaman; Owain Barton	6:30
9.	"Cowboy Style"	Minogue; Anderson; Seaman; Malcolm McLaren; Trevor Horn; Anne Dudley; Marshall Mathers; Mike Elizondo; Andre Young; Tommy Coster	5:42
10.	"Kids"	Guy Chambers; Robbie Williams	4:42
11.	"On a Night Like This"	Steve Torch; Graham Stack; Mark Taylor; Brian Rawling	3:42
12.	"Locomotion"	Gerry Goffin; Carole King	3:48
13.	"In Your Eyes" (Latin section)	Minogue; Stannard; Gallagher; Howes; John Themis; Diane Warren	5:17
14.	"Limbo"	Minogue; Dave Ball; Ingo Vauk	4:24
15.	"Light Years"/"I Feel Love"	Minogue; Stannard; Gallagher; Donna Summer; Giorgio Moroder; Pete Bellotte	5:44
16.	"I Should Be So Lucky"	Stock; Aitken; Waterman; Minogue; Anderson; Seaman	6:00
17.	"Burning Up"	Greg Fitzgerald; Tom Nichols	4:18
18.	"Better the Devil You Know"	Stock; Aitken; Waterman	5:43
19.	"Can't Get Blue Monday Out of My Head"	Dennis; Davis; Bernard Sumner; Gillian Gilbert; Peter Hook; Stephen Morris	4:28
Total length:			108:03

Extra feature – Documentary
No.	Title	Length
1.	"Feel the Fever"	34:07

Extra feature – Projections
No.	Title	Length
1.	"Cowboy Style"	6:21
2.	"Light Years/I Feel Love"	7:08
3.	"I Should Be So Lucky"	6:00
4.	"Burning Up"	5:42
Total length:		25:11

Note

- "I Should Be So Lucky" is listed on releases as "Lucky".
- In the DVD menu, the songs are divided into respective acts based on the setlist.

== Certifications ==
Certifications
Region	Certification	Certified units/sales
Argentina (CAPIF)	Platinum	8,000^{^}
Australia (ARIA)	2× Platinum	30,000^{^}
Canada (Music Canada)	Platinum	10,000^{^}
Germany (BVMI)	Gold	25,000^{^}
United Kingdom (BPI)	2× Platinum	100,000^{*}
^{*} Sales figures based on certification alone.^{^} Shipments figures based on certification alone.
