= Stéphane Sednaoui =

French director, photographer and producer

- Born: Paris, France
- Occupations: Director, photographer, producer
- Years active: 1981–present
- Relatives: Elisa Sednaoui (niece)

Stéphane Sednaoui (French: [steˈfan sednaˈwi]) is a French music video director, photographer, film producer and actor. He has worked in various forms of media, including music videos, photojournalism, portrait photography, fashion and pop culture.

Sednaoui's career began at age 18 as a casting director for advertising campaigns and as a model for photographers and artists. At age 21, he began creating portraits for various publications before transitioning to photographing designers and models. Sednaoui has directed over 40 music videos, including "Give It Away" and "Scar Tissue" (Red Hot Chili Peppers), "Sly" (Massive Attack), "Mysterious Ways" (U2), "Big Time Sensuality" (Björk), "Fever" (Madonna), "German Bold Italic" (Towa Tei feat. Kylie Minogue), and "Queer" (Garbage). As a photojournalist, he covered events such as the Romanian Revolution of 1989 and the 2001 September 11 attacks on the World Trade Center. He has also been a regular contributor to Vogue Italia, Vogue China, Vanity Fair, The New York Times Magazine, Interview and Visionaire as a fashion and portrait photographer.

Over the years, Sednaoui has redefined his artistic approach to focus on fine-art and cinematographic projects. His work has been exhibited at the MoMA, New York (2015), the National September 11 Memorial & Museum (2013–2015), New York, the Brooklyn Museum, New York (2013), the Barbican Center, London (2014), Le Grand Palais, Paris (2015), the National Gallery of Victoria, Melbourne (2014) and in a solo exhibition at the Sam Art Projects Foundation, Paris (2013).

In 2005, his work with music videos was included in Palm Pictures's Directors Label, a series of DVDs compiling the work of notable music video directors.

== Early career ==
Although Sednaoui never received formal training as a photographer or director, he shaped his artistic approach between the ages of 18 and 22 with the support of two major artists: William Klein and Jean-Paul Gaultier. At 18, he started as a casting director for advertising campaigns before becoming a model and the face of Jean-Paul Gaultier's brand for two years (1982–1984). Through this collaboration, he modeled for photographers Steven Meisel and Peter Lindbergh, and for artists Andy Warhol and William Klein. At 21, his mentor photographer-director William Klein offered him the position of casting director for the docufiction film Mode in France (1985). At 22, he was a dancer in French choreographer Régine Chopinot's creation Le Défilé (1985), for which Jean-Paul Gaultier collaborated by creating the costumes.

The Jean-Paul Gaultier, William Klein, and Regine Chopinot collaborations were documented by Sednaoui and shown years later: his pictures of Gaultier-Chopinot were exhibited in 2007 at the Musée des Arts Décoratifs of the Louvre, and his experience with William Klein was published in 2009 as a portfolio in the French magazine "Paradis".

== Career ==
=== Photographic essays ===
Influenced by the experimental work of William Klein, Robert Frank, and Bill Brandt, Sednaoui's first photographic projects took the form of abstract photographic essays.

=== Portraits, pop culture, fashion, and photography ===
==== Portraiture ====
Sednaoui's first editorial assignment came at age 21 when he was commissioned to create portraits for UK Tatler magazine and then for French newspaper Libération. He has since collaborated with many magazines, including Vanity Fair, The New York Times Magazine, Interview and the French newspaper Le Monde.

==== Pop culture ====
He then began contributing to pop culture magazine The Face and Annie Flanders' Details publication (initially an underground magazine founded by Annie Flanders) in 1988. There, he combined pop culture with fashion references. In the hand-made decoupage story "Fashion Heroes", Sednaoui photographed designers Jean-Paul Gaultier, Azzedine Alaia and Vivienne Westwood, alongside the models of that era. The story was recognized by William Klein and Jean-Paul Goude. Sednaoui began creating visuals and album covers for artists such as Björk, Mick Jagger and Madonna.

==== Fashion ====
In parallel with his start in pop culture, Franca Sozzani gave Sednaoui his first fashion assignment for the Italian magazine Per Lui and later for Vogue Italia. Sednaoui's initial approach to fashion was energetic and sometimes cartoonish, similar to his pop culture images. A more narrative cinematic approach emerged in 2000, naturally influenced by his years as a music video director. During this period, Sednaoui was a regular contributor to Vogue Italia, French Numéro, Vogue China, and Visionaire.

=== Photojournalism ===
He photographed the Romanian Revolution of 1989 (published in French newspaper Libération and UK Arena magazine). Ten years later, he photographed and filmed the fall of the Twin Towers during the September 11 attacks and joined the search and rescue teams at Ground Zero in the following days. In the following weeks, a portfolio was published in Talk magazine and was featured on the cover of a special issue of French newspaper Libération. In September 2011, Time magazine published a complete portfolio on its website. The National September 11 Memorial & Museum has dedicated an entire room to Sednaoui's images. The book Search and Rescue at Ground Zero was published by Kehrer Verlag in 2014. In her foreword, Alice M. Greenwald, the director of the museum, wrote: "We are indebted to Stéphane Sednaoui, who felt compelled – not as a photographer but as a human being – to rush down, that afternoon, to what would soon come to be known as Ground Zero, hoping to volunteer in the search and rescue efforts underway".

=== Music videos ===
After his breakthrough in France with a video for the French rap band NTM (1990), Sednaoui moved to the US. His video for the Red Hot Chili Peppers' "Give It Away" (1991) won an award at the 1992 MTV Video Music Awards.

Other Sednaoui music videos that were nominated for or received MTV Video Music Awards include: "Sleep to Dream" (Fiona Apple), "Mysterious Ways" (U2), "Today" (The Smashing Pumpkins), "Big Time Sensuality" (Björk), "7 Seconds" (Youssou N'Dour and Neneh Cherry), "Queer" (Garbage), "Hell Is Round the Corner" (Tricky), "Ironic" (Alanis Morissette), "Possibly Maybe" (Björk), "GBI (German Bold Italic)" (Towa Tei featuring Kylie Minogue) and "Le Nouveau Western" (MC Solaar).

His work is documented in The Work of Director Stephane Sednaoui (2005) from the Directors Label series, a collection of DVDs devoted to music video directors, along with Spike Jonze, Michel Gondry, Anton Corbijn, Jonathan Glazer, Chris Cunningham and Mark Romanek.

By the end of 2001, Sednaoui had largely stopped directing music videos, with only rare exceptions.

=== Art ===
Sednaoui has redefined his artistic approach to focus on fine-art and cinematographic projects. His work has been exhibited at the MoMA, New York (2015), the 9/11 Memorial Museum (2013–2015), New York, the Brooklyn Museum, New York (2013), the Barbican Center, London (2014), Le Grand Palais, Paris (2015), the National Gallery of Victoria, Melbourne (2014) and Sam Art Projects Foundation, Paris (2013).

=== Acting ===
Sednaoui's prominent roles include appearances in G.H.B. (2013) playing opposite Marina Hands, directed by Laetitia Masson, and in Samui Song (2016) playing opposite Laila Boonyasak and Vithaya Pansringarm, directed by Pen-Ek Ratanaruang.

== Personal life ==
His mother was photographic agent Yannick Morisot and his uncle was jazzman David Earle Johnson.

He was in relationships with singers Björk and Kylie Minogue, with whom he also collaborated artistically. In October 2001, his girlfriend Laetitia Casta gave birth to their daughter Sahteene.

Sednaoui lives in Paris and New York. His Egyptian-born grandfather came from a Melkite Greek Catholic family of Syrian descent. The family traces its roots to the city of Sednaya in Syria, which is where the surname originates. The Sednaoui family migrated to Egypt at the end of the 19th century and developed successful department stores in Cairo. These were once considered the Middle Eastern counterpart of the famous department stores known in London, Paris and New York.

Elisa Sednaoui is his niece.

== Filmography ==
=== Short films ===
- "Acqua Natasa" (2002)
- "Walk on the Wild Side" (2005) A 10-minute film based on Lou Reed's song "Walk on the Wild Side".
- "Army of Me" (2005) An animation based on Björk's song "Army of Me".
- "Clues: The Mother of My Death" (2014)

=== Music videos ===
1990

- "Le monde de demain" by Suprême NTM

1991

- "Kozmik" by Ziggy Marley
- "Give It Away" by Red Hot Chili Peppers
- "Mysterious Ways" by U2

1992

- "Breaking the Girl" by Red Hot Chili Peppers
- "Sometimes Salvation" by The Black Crowes, featuring Sofia Coppola

1993

- "Way of the Wind" (version 1) by P.M. Dawn
- "Fever" by Madonna
- "Today" by The Smashing Pumpkins
- "Big Time Sensuality" by Björk

1994

- "Nouveau Western" by MC Solaar
- "7 Seconds" (version 1) by Youssou N'Dour & Neneh Cherry
- "Sly" by Massive Attack

1995

- "Fragile" by Isaac Hayes
- "Queer" by Garbage
- "Fallen Angel" by Traci Lords
- "Hell Is Round the Corner" by Tricky
- "Pumpkin" by Tricky
- "Ironic" by Alanis Morissette

1996

- "Whatever You Want" by Tina Turner
- "Here Come the Aliens" by Tricky
- "Milk" by Garbage
- "Discothèque" (version 1) by U2
- "Possibly Maybe" by Björk

1997

- "Sleep to Dream" by Fiona Apple
- "Gangster Moderne" by MC Solaar
- "Never Is a Promise" by Fiona Apple
- "GBI: German Bold Italic" by Towa Tei & Kylie Minogue

1998

- "Thank U" by Alanis Morissette
- "Lotus" by R.E.M.
- "I'm Known" by Keziah Jones
- "Falling in Love Again" by Eagle-Eye Cherry

1999

- "You Look So Fine" by Garbage
- "Sweet Child o' Mine" by Sheryl Crow
- "Scar Tissue" by Red Hot Chili Peppers
- "For Real" by Tricky featuring DJ Muggs
- "Nothing Much Happens" by Ben Lee
- "Summer Son" by Texas
- "Around the World" by Red Hot Chili Peppers
- "The Chemicals Between Us" by Bush

2000

- "Mixed Bizness" by Beck
- "Tailler la zone" by Alain Souchon
- "Let's Ride" by Q-Tip
- "Disco Science" by Mirwais
- "I Can't Wait" by Mirwais

2001

- "Dream On" by Depeche Mode
- "Little L" by Jamiroquai

2003

- "Anti-matter" by Tricky

2009

- "Get It Right" by Y.A.S.

2014

- "Distant Lover" by Emmanuelle Seigner

== Books ==
- Sednaoui, Stéphane (2014). Search and Rescue at Ground Zero. Kehrer Verlag. ISBN 978-3-86828-514-7.

== Compilations ==
- The Work of Director Stephane Sednaoui (2005) from the Directors Label series released by Palm Pictures.
