= 24: The Soundtrack =

Soundtrack album by Sean Callery

24: Original Television Soundtrack

Studio album by Sean Callery
- Released: December 7, 2004
- Recorded: 2001–2004
- Genre: Electronic music
- Length: 0:51:18
- Label: Varèse Sarabande; Fox Music
- Producer: Sean Callery

Sean Callery chronology
| La Femme Nikita (TV series) (2003) | 24: Original Television Soundtrack (2004) | James Bond 007: Everything or Nothing (2005) |

24: Original Television Soundtrack, released on December 7, 2004 in the US, is an album based on the Fox television drama series 24. It contains nineteen tracks of music composed exclusively for the first three seasons by producer Sean Callery, including the show's full theme song, which has never been aired.

The music is a hybrid mix of electronic pulses and rich orchestral textures, meant to give each episode its own sound yet remain consistent with the rest of the series to complement the show's "real-time" format. The album insert contains various photographs from the three seasons and also includes Callery's comments about how he went about producing each track. The liner notes also list which specific episode each track comes from. The album was released by Varèse Sarabande and Fox Music in the US, Virgin TV in the UK, and EMI in Japan.

This album has been released with the Copy Control protection system in some regions.

Callery received 8 nominations for a Primetime Emmy Awards for Outstanding Music Composition for the series; he won the award three times, in 2003, 2006 and 2010.

== Track listing ==
1. "'24' Theme" – 4:41
2. "Up and Down Stairs" – 2:44
3. "L.A. at 9:00 a.m." – 1:57
4. "Jack on the Move" – 2:19
5. "Jack's Revenge at the Docks" – 4:02
6. "Kim and Teri's Escape from the Safe House" – 2:03
7. "Jack in the Limo" – 2:41
8. "In Pursuit of Kyle" – 2:39
9. "Salazar's Theme" – 1:54
10. "'Copter Chase Over L.A." – 2:32
11. "Jack Tells Kim He's Not Coming Back" – 2:12
12. "The Bomb Detonates" – 2:38
13. "Palmer's Theme" – 1:50
14. "Alexis" – 2:04
15. "Coliseum Finale" – 1:56
16. "Amnesia" – 2:14
17. "Jack and Kim Trying to Reconnect" – 3:05
18. "Season One Finale / Teri's Death" – 5:33
19. "Season Three Finale / Jack's Humanity" – 2:14
20. "Gunman For Breakfast" – 2:24 (Japanese edition only)
21. "Christiansands" (Performed by Tricky) – 3:53 (European and Japanese editions only)
22. "'24' Theme - The Longest Day (Armin Van Buuren Remix - Album Edit)" – 7:54 (European and Japanese editions only)
23. "CTU Intercom" – 0:04 (European and Japanese editions only)
24. "CTU Ring 1" – 0:04 (European and Japanese editions only)
25. "CTU Ring 2" – 0:04 (European and Japanese editions only)

(Note that on Track 6 and Track 18, "Teri" is misspelled on the CD as "Terry".)

The Japanese and European editions include exclusive tracks.

== Other soundtracks ==
24: Seasons Four and Five – Original Television Soundtrack

Studio album by Sean Callery
- Released: November 14, 2006
- Recorded: 2004–2006
- Genre: Electronic music
- Length: 1:10:00
- Label: Varèse Sarabande; Fox Music
- Producer: Sean Callery

=== 24: Seasons Four and Five – Original Television Soundtrack ===
24: Seasons Four and Five – Original Television Soundtrack contains 21 songs from Season 4, Season 5, and 24: The Game. It contains approximately 1 Hour and 10 Minutes of music. The soundtrack was released on November 14, 2006. The orchestral selections from 24: The Game were "recorded at Abbey Road Studios in London in the Summer of 2005."

1. "'24' Main Title" – 4:48
2. "Collette's Arrest" – 2:51
3. "Closing in on Marwan" – 4:27
4. "Death in the Open Desert" – 1:42
5. "Logan's Downfall" – 6:38
6. "Mandy's Plan" – 2:55
7. "Henderson" – 2:40
8. "Jack's Women" – 3:36
9. "C.T.U." – 3:55
10. "The Name's O'Brian— Chloe O'Brian" – 2:31
11. "Mission Briefing" – 2:12
12. "Bierko Entering the Gas Company" – 2:36
13. "Logan's Near Suicide" – 2:24
14. "Lynn McGill's Sacrifice" – 3:50
15. "Base Mission" – 2:36
16. "Airport Russians" – 2:45
17. "Infiltrating the Sub" – 5:59
18. "Loft Mission" – 2:66
19. "Reviving Jack" – 3:16
20. "Jack Storms the Gas Plant" – 8:10
21. "Tony's Farewell" – 1:36

(Note that the third track title, "Closing In On Marwan", is misspelled on the release as "Closing in on Marwon".)

=== 24: Redemption ===
24: Redemption is a soundtrack released by Varése Sarabande and Fox Music for the TV movie, 24: Redemption, which bridged the gap between Season 6 and Season 7. It is the first time the music of Sean Callery has been presented in the form of a single self-contained work.

1. "Prologue — Sangala" (04:07)
2. "Across the Plains" (01:00)
3. "Willie" (02:56)
4. "Dubaku on the Hunt" (03:17)
5. "Jack and Benton" (03:33)
6. "Soccer Game Interrupted" (03:55)
7. "Vultures" (02:51)
8. "Paranoid Friend" (01:32)
9. "Don’t Let Them Take My Kids" (04:44)
10. "Tortured Jack "(03:56)
11. "Evacuating the School" (03:09)
12. "Anything at All" (01:44)
13. "One Man Against Juma’s Army" (02:36)
14. "Benton’s Sacrifice" (04:27)
15. "Street Battle" (03:37)
16. "Open the Gate" (04:22)
17. "New President in a Troubled World" (02:52)

=== 24: The Game Original Game Score ===
24 Original Game Score is a soundtrack of new songs that Sean Callery made exclusively for 24: The Game, which takes place between Season 2 and Season 3 although the game uses songs from the series. It was "live orchestred performing nearly 30 minutes of original music". However, unlike the original soundtrack, it was only offered as digital download.

1. "'24' Symphonic Suite" – 4:47
2. "Storming The Cargo Ship" – 3:03
3. "Sean Is Shot" – 2:33
4. "Jack At The Base Part 2" – 2:53
5. "Kim Surrenders" – 2:14
6. "The Ship Is Taken" – 2:54
7. "CTU Takeover" – 2:55
8. "CTU Shootout" – 1:03

=== 24: The Longest Day/Remix Bundle ===
24 The Longest Day or officially as 24: Remix Bundle is a custom soundtrack of the 24 theme song by international producer Armin Van Buuren. It contains three versions of the theme. This CD was never released in the US. However, there is the music video of this song included in the 24 Season 4 DVD set, and the song itself is available for download on iTunes.

1. "'24' Theme - The Longest Day (Armin Van Buuren Remix)" – 10:02
2. "'24' Theme - The Longest Day (Armin Van Buuren Remix – Radio Edit)" – 3:26
3. "'24' Theme - The Longest Day (Armin Van Buuren Remix – Album Edit)" – 8:11

=== iTunes Exclusive Remixes ===
Apple's iTunes offers three exclusive remixes on the 24 theme song. These remixes are exclusively for 24 Season Six season pass holders (purchasing all the episodes of the season in bulk). The theme song is remixed by The Crystal Method, Benny Benassi, and Towa Tei.
