= KylieX2008 =

2008 concert tour by Kylie Minogue

- Tour by Kylie Minogue
- Location: Europe; South America; Asia; Oceania
- Associated album: X
- Start date: 6 May 2008
- End date: 22 December 2008
- Legs: 5
- No. of shows: 74
- Box office: US$70 million ($102.6 million in 2024 dollars)

Kylie Minogue concert chronology
- Showgirl: Homecoming Tour (2006–07); KylieX2008 (2008); For Me, For You Tour (2009)

KylieX2008 was the tenth concert tour by Australian recording artist Kylie Minogue, in support of her tenth studio album, X (2007). The tour began on 6 May 2008 in Paris, France, and concluded on 22 December 2008 in Melbourne, Australia; comprising 74 shows. It was notable for marking Minogue's first concerts in various countries, including the Middle East and South America. In 2009, both Billboard and Pollstar confirmed that KylieX2008 generated an estimated US$70m in ticket sales.

== Background ==
After months of speculation it was announced through Kylie's official website that "KylieX2008" would commence in Paris, traveling internationally.

By way of introduction, Minogue stated:

I am putting together a show that is going to be a new and exciting experience for both the audience and myself. The eclectic mix of sounds on X is affording me an opportunity to explore and develop a new live show that will be fresh, exhilarating and innovative. After two celebratory tours, X will be a look to the future but will definitely include favourites alongside the new. I can't wait to share it with you next year.

While rehearsing for the tour, Minogue released several behind-the-scenes videos on her website. Concurrently, she released "X" in the United States and filmed two music videos for the third single, "All I See" (including an acoustic rendition).

As the tour began to sell out all over Europe and the UK, many fans speculated that Minogue would bring her tour to Australia and Japan. While promoting her ITV special, The Kylie Show on "Sunrise", she stated: "I just want to have in my head more solidly what the tour will be and if I can manage what I have so far, I would love to come back [to Australia]". It was later revealed that Minogue would bring a limited number of shows to her home country, stating, "The reason I hadn't confirmed dates in Australia is I really didn't know what I was getting into [...] But now I know".

Following KylieX2008, Minogue toured North America for the first time with 2009's For You, For Me Tour.

== Concert synopsis ==
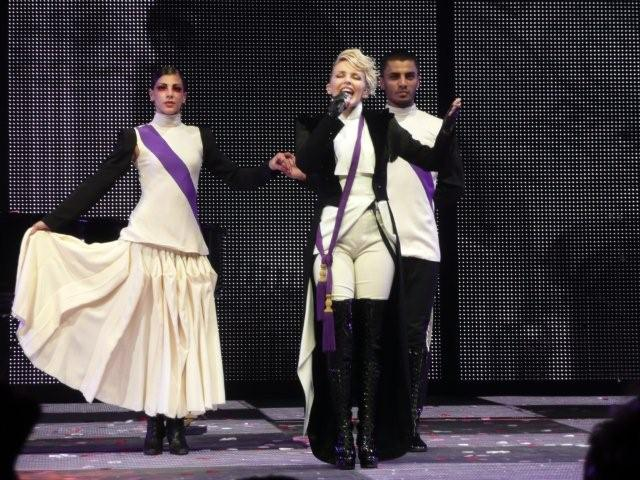
Minogue as a tsar

As with the X album, the tour rippled the "new wave" theme, made popular in the '80s. The show was divided into seven acts along with an encore. Throughout the course of the tour the show evolved, with numerous changes and revisions.

The concert consisted of a high-tech three-tier stage. On the left and right, mini-stages were made available for the band and backing singers. The main stage was minimalist, with an illuminated video floor and huge moving video curtains as the backdrop. For performances in amphitheaters, open air venues and small arenas the illuminated floor and the lavish props were removed due to technical limitations.

Minogue described the show as being "a show within a show", stating that each act is dramatically different from one another. Minogue stated she was inspired by Queen frontman, Freddie Mercury. "I'm releasing my inner Freddie Mercury. It's hard to explain but parts of the show are so over the top. When I sing 'Your Disco Needs You', it's a real Freddie moment."

The first act Xlectro Static act opens the show with a futuristic video showing the outline of Minogue's face polarised in neon colours. The huge video curtains slide open to reveal Minogue perched in a giant hoop dressed in a 'spiderwoman' gown (the dress, however, changes as the tour reaches South America). On technically limited shows, the giant stereo speakers move to reveal Minogue. She performs "Speakerphone", "Can't Get You Out of My Head", an unreleased track entitled "Ruffle My Feathers" and "In Your Eyes".

The second act Cheer Squad opens with an homage to the Toni Basil hit "Mickey", with Kylie and her dancers appearing as American cheerleaders. Themed as a high-school pep rally, Minogue performs "Heart Beat Rock", "Wow" and "Shocked", the latter being reduced to a dance interlude at some dates.

The third act Beach Party this act is a rereading of the On a Night Like This tour. This act begins with "Loveboat" and continues with a cover of the Barry Manilow hit "Copacabana". On the opening night, "That's Why They Write Love Songs", a tribute to the many romantic show tunes of the 1940s and 1950s, is also performed. Kylie closes the act with "Spinning Around".

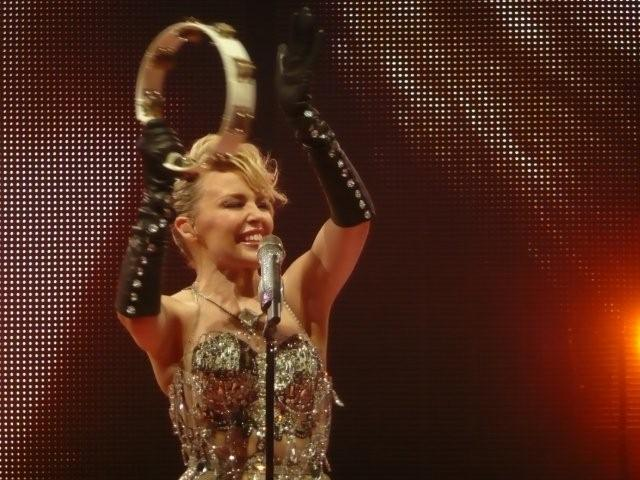
Minogue performing "No More Rain"

For the fourth act Xposed, Minogue is dressed as an 'erotic bellboy'. She appears on a gigantic skull suspended high above the stage performing "Like a Drug". The skull descends to the stage and Kylie goes on to perform "Slow", with excerpts of "Free" (from Intimate and Live), and "2 Hearts". The skull received a very positive reaction from the fans, and was replaced by a CG reproduction at the concerts it could not be featured due to stage limitations (this additional projection was not present before the South American leg).

The Asian-influenced fifth act Naughty Manga Girl sees Minogue emerging on stage in a pyramid which unfurls to reveal Kylie in an outfit inspired by Japanese manga, performing "Come into My World", "Nu-di-ty" and "Sensitized". This segment, which opens with a video of "Sometime Samurai", was completely cut from the technically limited concerts.

The show progresses to its sixth act Starry Nights, with Minogue appearing in a blue satin gown and premiering another new song, "Flower", she then performs a ballad version of "I Believe in You". The act ended with "Cosmic" on the initial dates, but this song was later dropped.

In the seventh act Black Versus White, Minogue appears as a tsar, performing "On a Night Like This", "Your Disco Needs You", "Kids", "Step Back in Time" and "In My Arms". The act begins with a black and white theme and progresses into colour.

Minogue re-emerges on stage in an evening suit to perform an encore. This began with "No More Rain" at all shows except in South America. There, it was removed from the set after the 1 November show for the remainder of that leg. Many songs were added and swapped around during this act including "The One", "Love at First Sight", "I Should Be So Lucky" and the acoustic rendition of "All I See". Starting during the South American leg, "Better the Devil You Know" was performed. For the first two performances in South America only, "Somewhere" was performed, a song from the musical West Side Story.

== Critical reception ==
The tour received excellent reviews from many critics throughout the UK and Europe. Many called it Minogue's best tour to date. The tour generally sold well throughout Europe and has been seen as a major success. Due to large public demand, several additional dates were slowly added since the tour announcement. Tickets for the original eight shows of the UK leg sold-out in just thirty minutes, and Minogue went on to sell tickets for more than twenty-five shows in England, Scotland, and Northern Ireland. The six shows at the Manchester Evening News Arena made Minogue the all-time most-featured artist at the venue. The UK leg of the tour grossed over US$26,000,000, with Minogue performing to around 300,000 spectators in total.

== Broadcasts and recordings ==
KylieX2008 premiered on the launch night of 4Music channel in 15 August 2008. The concert was one of the first broadcast on the new station. It was later shown on Channel 4. In October 2008, it was revealed that FremantleMedia would release a DVD entitled KylieX2008. The disc features the full length concert along with a photo gallery and screen projections. It was released in the United Kingdom and Australia on 1 December 2008. A later release on Blu-ray followed.

== Set list ==
This set list represents the 2 August 2008 concert in London, England.

Act 1: Xlectro Static

1. "Speakerphone"
2. "Can't Get You Out of My Head" (Greg Kurstin Remix) (contains an excerpt from "Boombox" and elements of "Blue Monday")
3. "Ruffle My Feathers"
4. "In Your Eyes"

Act 2: Cheer Squad

5. "Heart Beat Rock" (contains elements of "Mickey")
6. "Wow"
7. "Shocked" (DNA Mix)

Act 3: Beach Party

8. "Loveboat" (contains elements of "The Love Boat")
9. "Copacabana"
10. "Spinning Around" (contains elements of "Got to be Real")

Act 4: Xposed

11. "Like a Drug"
12. "Slow" (with excerpts from "Free")
13. "2 Hearts"

Act 5: Naughty Manga Girl

14. "Sometime Samurai" (Video Interlude) (contains elements of "German Bold Italic")
15. "Come into My World" (Fischerspooner Mix) (contains elements of "Finer Feelings" and "Dreams")
16. "Nu-di-ty"
17. "Sensitized"

Act 6: Starry Nights

18. "Flower"
19. "I Believe in You"

Act 7: Black Versus White

20. "On a Night Like This"
21. "Your Disco Needs You"
22. "Kids"
23. "Step Back in Time"
24. "In My Arms"

Encore

25. "No More Rain"
26. "The One" (Freemasons Remix)
27. "Love at First Sight" (Ruff and Jam U.S. Remix)
28. "I Should Be So Lucky"
Notes
- On select dates, Minogue sang "All I See" and "Shocked" served as an interlude.
- "That’s Why They Write Love Songs", an unreleased song, was performed during the opening night in Paris.
- "Your Disco Needs You" was performed only at select dates, and was not originally a part of the setlist.
- Starting on 14 May, "Cosmic" was cut from the set list.
- Minogue performed "Confide in Me", as a fan request, in Frankfurt.
- "I Should Be So Lucky" was added to the set list on 17 May, but was not performed in Lima, Santiago, and during the third Sydney show.
- "Somewhere" was performed from 1 to 4 November.
- Minogue covered Juanes' "La Camisa Negra" during the performance in Tocancipá.
- Starting on 1 November, "Better the Devil You Know" was performed during the encore.
- From 4 to 15 November, "No More Rain" was temporarily removed from the set list.
- An a cappella of "Come into My World" was performed in São Paulo.
- "The Loco-Motion" was performed in Santiago.
- "Bésame Mucho" was performed in Buenos Aires.
- "Flower" was not performed in Dubai, Bangkok, Singapore, Taipei, and Auckland. Additionally, "I Believe in You" was performed earlier in the set list.
- Minogue performed an excerpt of "Please Stay" in Beijing.
- "Did It Again" and "The Loco-Motion" were performed as fan requests on 17 December.
- Minogue performed "Santa Baby" and "Single Ladies (Put a Ring on It)" on 22 December.

== Tour dates ==
List of 2008 concerts
Date (2008)	City	Country	Venue
6 May	Paris	France	Palais Omnisports de Paris-Bercy
7 May	Antwerp	Belgium	Sportpaleis
9 May	Stuttgart	Germany	Hanns-Martin-Schleyer-Halle
10 May	Frankfurt	Germany	Festhalle Frankfurt
12 May	Prague	Czech Republic	O_{2} Arena
14 May	Vienna	Austria	Wiener Stadthalle
15 May	Budapest	Hungary	László Papp Budapest Sports Arena
17 May	Bucharest	Romania	Stadionul Cotroceni
18 May	Sofia	Bulgaria	Lokomotiv Stadium
20 May	Istanbul	Turkey	Turkcell Kuruçeşme Arena
22 May	Athens	Greece	Terra Vibe Park
25 May	Zürich	Switzerland	Hallenstadion
27 May	Cologne	Germany	Kölnarena
29 May	Munich	Germany	Olympiahalle
30 May	Geneva	Switzerland	SEG Geneva Arena
1 June	Lyon	France	Halle Tony Garnier
3 June	Madrid	Spain	Palacio de Deportes
5 June	Esch-sur-Alzette	Luxembourg	Rockhal
7 June	Hamburg	Germany	Color Line Arena
8 June	Copenhagen	Denmark	Forum Copenhagen
10 June	Oslo	Norway	Oslo Spektrum
11 June	Stockholm	Sweden	Stockholm Globe Arena
13 June	Helsinki	Finland	Hartwall Areena
16 June	Moscow	Russia	Olimpiyskiy
18 June	St. Petersburg	Russia	Ice Palace
20 June	Riga	Latvia	Arena Riga
22 June	Berlin	Germany	Velodrom
23 June	Rotterdam	Netherlands	Rotterdam Ahoy Sportpaleis
26 June	Belfast	Northern Ireland	Odyssey Arena
27 June	Belfast	Northern Ireland	Odyssey Arena
29 June	Belfast	Northern Ireland	Odyssey Arena
30 June	Belfast	Northern Ireland	Odyssey Arena
5 July	Glasgow	Scotland	SECC Concert Hall 4
6 July	Glasgow	Scotland	SECC Concert Hall 4
8 July	Glasgow	Scotland	SECC Concert Hall 4
9 July	Glasgow	Scotland	SECC Concert Hall 4
11 July	Manchester	England	Manchester Evening News Arena
12 July	Manchester	England	Manchester Evening News Arena
14 July	Manchester	England	Manchester Evening News Arena
15 July	Manchester	England	Manchester Evening News Arena
17 July	Manchester	England	Manchester Evening News Arena
18 July	Manchester	England	Manchester Evening News Arena
20 July	Newcastle	England	Metro Radio Arena
21 July	Newcastle	England	Metro Radio Arena
23 July	Newcastle	England	Metro Radio Arena
24 July	Newcastle	England	Metro Radio Arena
26 July	London	England	The O_{2} Arena
27 July	London	England	The O_{2} Arena
29 July	London	England	The O_{2} Arena
30 July	London	England	The O_{2} Arena
1 August	London	England	The O_{2} Arena
2 August	London	England	The O_{2} Arena
4 August	London	England	The O_{2} Arena
1 November	Tocancipá	Colombia	Parque Jaime Duque
4 November	Caracas	Venezuela	Poliedro de Caracas
6 November	Lima	Peru	Explanada Del Monumental
8 November	São Paulo	Brazil	Credicard Hall
13 November	Santiago	Chile	Pista Atlética del Estadio Nacional
15 November	Buenos Aires	Argentina	Estadio G.E.B.A.
21 November	Dubai	United Arab Emirates	Dubai Festival City Concert Area
23 November	Bangkok	Thailand	Impact Arena
25 November	Singapore		Singapore Indoor Stadium
27 November	Hong Kong		AsiaWorld–Arena
29 November	Shanghai	China	Hongkou Stadium
1 December	Beijing	China	Beijing Workers' Gymnasium
4 December	Taipei	Taiwan	Zhongshan Soccer Stadium
8 December	Auckland	New Zealand	Vector Arena
9 December	Auckland	New Zealand	Vector Arena
14 December	Sydney	Australia	Acer Arena
16 December	Sydney	Australia	Acer Arena
17 December	Sydney	Australia	Acer Arena
19 December	Melbourne	Australia	Rod Laver Arena
20 December	Melbourne	Australia	Rod Laver Arena
22 December	Melbourne	Australia	Rod Laver Arena

== Box office score data ==
List of 2008 concerts showing, venue, city, tickets sold, number of available tickets and gross revenue
Venue	City	Attendance	Revenue
Palais Omnisports de Paris-Bercy	Paris	17,008 / 17,008	$1,001,035
Sportpaleis	Antwerp	15,613 / 15,719	$996,383
O_{2} Arena	Prague	17,853 / 17,853	$877,906
Olimpiyskiy	Moscow	15,900 / 15,900	$904,472
Odyssey Arena	Belfast	37,536 / 37,536	$3,549,422
SECC Concert Hall 4	Glasgow	31,080 / 31,080	$2,980,262
Manchester Evening News Arena	Manchester	75,972 / 75,972	$7,268,153
Metro Radio Arena	Newcastle	35,812 / 35,812	$3,116,320
The O_{2} Arena	London	116,375 / 116,375	$9,881,561
Parque Jaime Duque	Tocancipá	6,023 / 7,870	$833,088
Poliedro de Caracas	Caracas	4,226 / 7,000	$814,912
Credicard Hall	São Paulo	5,082 / 6,938	$258,062
Impact Arena	Bangkok	11,250 / 12,900	$1,504,472
Singapore Indoor Stadium	Singapore	7,259 / 10,599	$1,043,518
AsiaWorld–Arena	Hong Kong	8,798 / 10,598	$1,070,819
Vector Arena	Auckland	19,800 / 19,800	$1,187,399
Acer Arena	Sydney	51,462 / 51,462	$4,194,452
Rod Laver Arena	Melbourne	36,000 / 36,000	$2,639,829
Total		513,049 / 526,422 (97%)	$44,122,065

== Personnel ==
Adapted from the KylieX2008 credits.

Performers

- Sarah deCourcy – keyboards
- Matt Racher – drums
- Jenni Tarma – bass
- Adrian Eccleston – guitar
- Barnaby Dickinson – brass
- Graeme Blevins – brass
- Graeme Flowers – brass
- Dawn Joseph – backing vocals
- Roxanne Wilde – backing vocals
- Anoulka Yanminchev – dance captain
- Jason Beitel – dancer
- Hakim Ghorab – dancer
- Marco Da Silva – dancer
- Jessica DiDirolamo – dancer
- Jamie Karitzis – dancer
- Welly Locoh-Donou – dancer
- Jerry Reeve – dancer
- Tatiana Seguin – dancer
- Nikki Trow – dancer
- Terry Kvasnik – acrobat
- Nicolas Bosc – acrobat
- Vincent DePlanche – acrobat
- Johan Guy – acrobat

Technical

- Phil Murphy – technical manager, showcaller
- Toby Plant – stage manager
- Rodney Matheson – monitors
- Audio Crew Chief: Al Woods – audio crew chief
- Phil Down – audio technician
- George Hogan – audio technician
- Becky Pell – audio technician
- Matt Harman-Trick – audio technician
- Adam Birch – backline
- Marcus Lindsay – backline
- Nick Sizer – backline
- Andrew Porter – lighting
- John Sellors – lighting
- Jim Mills – lighting
- Hayden Corps – lighting
- Victor Anderseen – lighting
- Craig Lewis – lighting
- Barry Bamford – lighting
- Steve Belfield – lighting
- Dave Rowe – rigger
- Dave Brierley – rigger
- Omar Franchi – rigger
- Vinnie Rivenell – rigger
- Steve Walsh – rigger
- Ian Macdonald – motion control
- Simon Wait – motion control
- Chris Hansbury – motion control
- John Richardson – motion control
- Toby Pitts – carpentry
- Andy Pearson – carpentry
- Martyn Drew – carpentry
- Jem Nicholson – carpentry
- Pete Coryndon – carpentry
- Lisa Williams – wardrobe
- Naja Banz – wardrobe
- Becky Belfield – wardrobe
- Louise Martin – wardrobe
- Madge Foster – hair and makeup
- Gemma Flaherty – hair and makeup
- Stuart Heaney – video
- Andy Tonks – video
- Patrick Vansteelant – video
- Peter Laleman – video
- Graham Holwill – cameras
- Mark Cruickshank – cameras
- Darren Montague – cameras
- Gary Beirne – cameras
- Luke Levitt – cameras
- William Baker – creative director
- Steve Anderson – music producer
- Sarah deCourcy – musician director
- Sean Fitzpatrick – tour manager
- Kevin Hopgood – production manager
- Chris Pyne – audio, FOH sound
- Rod Matheson – audio
- Blink TV – screen visuals production
- Nick Whitehouse – lighting designer
- Bryan Leitch – lighting designer
- Nick Whitehouse – lighting director
- Raury Macphie – tour video director
- Michael Rooney – choreographer
- Jean Paul Gaultier – costume design
- Emma Roach – costume design
- Steve Stewart – costume design
- Gareth Pugh – costume design
- LeAnne Buckham – personal assistant to Kylie Minogue
- Michele Tankel – financial controller
- Lynn Curtis – guest list and sponsorship
- Juliette Baldrey – production coordinator
- James Gentles – head of security
- Jason Buckham – tour DJ
