= Arthrob =

Underground arts collective in England

Arthrob were an underground arts collective in London during the mid-late 1990s. They organised cultural events such as book readings and theatre in nightclubs, aiming to bring together club culture and the arts.

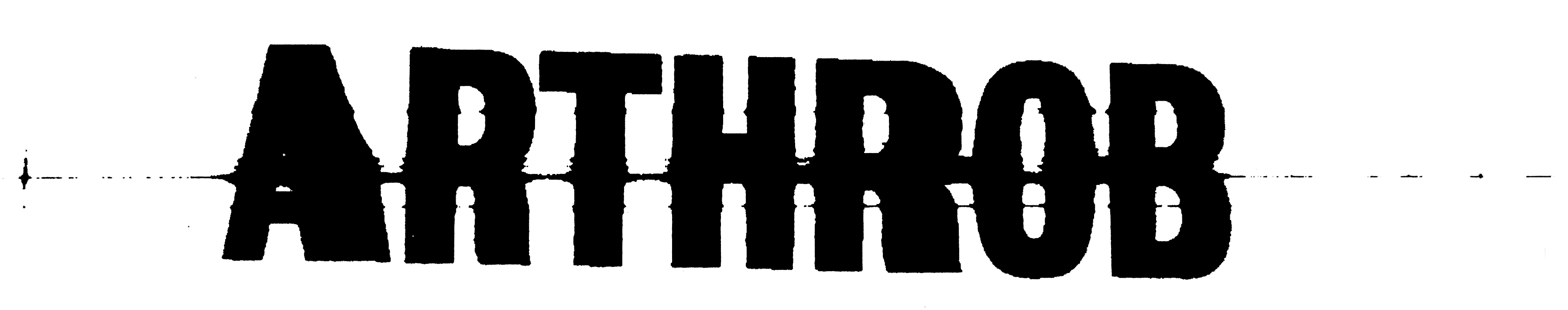

== Founding ==
Arthrob was founded by Chilean brothers Ernesto Leal and Juan Leal. The Leals had been born in Chile but their trade unionist family were forced to flee the Pinochet regime and they eventually found a new home in Scotland thanks to the National Union of Mineworkers. During the 1980s the brothers ran clubs in their adopted home town of Edinburgh and later in London. They were responsible for many acid house parties including the Zoom Records party in Clerkenwell, London.

Arthrob began life in 1995 as a vehicle to organise events to provide innovative book launches for Irvine Welsh and Hanif Kureishi. The goal was to bring culture into nightclubs and clubs into culture. Arthrob events were untidy affairs but the chaos heightened the immediacy and excitement.

The Leals founded a board of creatives known as the Arthrob Trust to guide the organisation.

== Events ==
The organisation was defined by their cross-genre events, presenting art for the "chemical generation". A typical event would involve theatre, book readings, bands and fine arts together with DJs and dancing. Visual installations were often provided by graphic design studio Tomato.

One event involved a tour bus of novelists on a 'rock and roll' literary road trip under the banner Defining a Nation, funded by the Arts Council.

In 1998 they devised and, in conjunction with the Random Collective produced seven theatre events in one afternoon in seven different venues around east London in celebration of the Bertolt Brecht centenary. Entitled "The Seven Deadly Sins", each site-specific event took a different sin as its theme. The venues were varied - Hoxton Hall, The Old Axe public house hosted a strip show; The Lux cinema, the old Hoxton Boxing Club, St Monica's Church hall and a former Barclays Bank in Shoreditch High Street played host to a reading on greed by Bill Drummond though many of the audience couldn't fit in this deliberately claustrophobic setting. The event was directed by Jan-Van Den Bosch and as well as Bill Drummond there were performances by Iain Sinclair, Miranda Sawyer, Neil Bartlett, Bella Black, Hanif Kureshi, Ben Richards and Tam Dean Burn.

Plans to create an Arthrob theatre space to showcase new writing talent and to create a live arts centre in the derelict GPO building in central Edinburgh during the Edinburgh Festival failed to be realised.

== Record label ==
In 1997, together with Nigel Dewart Gibb, Robin Hancock and Caroline Teeling Arthrob founded a record label backed by Warner Bros. Records offshoot Coalition Recordings, releasing an eclectic roster of artists from the contemporary classical music of Michael Gordon to Pelirocco, Fini Dolo, Towa Tei with Kylie Minogue, Silva Bullet, Crude Reality, Hubert Hudson and Belle Mouki, Glamorous Hooligan, Daz-i-kue, Sonja Sohn, Girl Talk, Frantic Language, Fonda Rae, Da Lunartiks, Saul Williamson and The All New Accelerators. The label also released a remix album of Steve Reich's music and a soundtrack compilation of classic acid house to accompany Sarah Champion's collection of short stories 'Disco Biscuits'.
