= Sweet Robots Against the Machine =

Studio album by Sweet Robots Against the Machine
- Released: February 10, 1997
- Genre: Electronic
- Length: 93:17
- Label: East West
- Producer: Towa Tei

Towa Tei chronology
Future Listening! (1994)	Sweet Robots Against the Machine (1997)	Sound Museum (1997)

Professional ratings
Review scores
Source	Rating
AllMusic	2.5/5 stars

Sweet Robots Against the Machine is the eponymous debut album by Sweet Robots Against the Machine, a pseudonym for Japanese music producer Towa Tei, released on February 10, 1997 by East West Records. It includes a cover version of Patrice Rushen's "Forget Me Nots".

== Track listing ==
All tracks are written by Towa Tei, except where noted

Disc one ("Main Course")
No.	Title	Writer(s)	Length
1.	"Hello Baby"		2:58
2.	"Forget Me Nots"	Patrice Rushen; Theresa McFaddin; Fred Washington	5:16
3.	"Hyp"		1:42
4.	"Lotus Snack and Thinking Machine"		1:30
5.	"Sweet News"		2:33
6.	"Sekar Gendot"	Traditional	9:06
7.	"Forget Me Nots" (SP-1200 remix)	Rushen; McFaddin; Washington	5:32
8.	"Another Sound Museum"		4:40
Total length:			33:17

Disc two ("Desert")
No.	Title	Length
1.	"A Night of Ubud"	60:00

== Charts ==
Chart (1997)	Peak position
Japanese Albums (Oricon)	55
