= Sunny (Towa Tei album) =

Studio album by Towa Tei
- Released: May 11, 2011
- Genre: Electronic
- Length: 40:40
- Label: Mach
- Producer: Towa Tei

Towa Tei chronology
Big Fun (2009)	Sunny (2011)	Lucky (2013)

Sunny is a 2011 studio album by Towa Tei. It peaked at number 23 on the Oricon Albums Chart.

== Track listing ==
No.	Title	Length
1.	"Alpha" (with Taprikk Sweezee)	3:51
2.	"Marvelous" (with Yurico)	2:59
3.	"Cloud" (with Haruomi Hosono)	3:21
4.	"The Burning Plain" (with Yukihiro Takahashi and Kiko Mizuhara)	3:41
5.	"Melancholic Sunshine"	3:17
6.	"Teenage Mutants" (with Miho Hatori)	3:50
7.	"Exterior"	3:23
8.	"Ruffles" (with Natural Calamity)	3:21
9.	"Upload"	2:10
10.	"Get Myself Together" (with Taprikk Sweezee)	3:58
11.	"Park" (with Mitsuko Koike)	4:33
12.	"Sunny Side of the Moon" (as O/S/T)	2:17

== Charts ==
Chart	Peak position
Japanese Albums (Oricon)	23
