= Big Fun (Towa Tei album) =

Studio album by Towa Tei
- Released: February 4, 2009
- Genre: Electronic
- Length: 43:47
- Label: Columbia Music Entertainment
- Producers: Towa Tei, Natural Calamity

Towa Tei chronology
Flash (2005)	Big Fun (2009)	Sunny (2011)

Big Fun is a 2009 studio album by Towa Tei. It peaked at number 25 on the Oricon Albums Chart.

== Track listing ==
No.	Title	Length
1.	"Y.O.R." (featuring Mademoiselle Yulia and Verbal)	3:30
2.	"Taste of You" (featuring Taprikk Sweezee)	4:21
3.	"Out of My Addiction of Love" (featuring Miho Hatori and Peggy Honeywell)	4:05
4.	"Lyricist" (featuring Meg)	2:46
5.	"Twinkle Twinkle Little Star" (featuring Mitsuko Koike)	4:45
6.	"A.O.R." (featuring Rina Ohta)	4:21
7.	"Ch. Galaxy"	2:45
8.	"Mind Wall" (featuring Miho Hatori)	4:57
9.	"Siesta"	8:23
10.	"All"	3:55

== Charts ==
Chart	Peak position
Japanese Albums (Oricon)	25
