= Last Century Modern =

Studio album by Towa Tei
- Released: July 28, 1999
- Studio: VU; Warner, Consipio, and Bunkamura (Tokyo); Kampo and Chung King (New York); Studio Plus XXX (Paris)
- Genre: Electronic
- Length: 44:15
- Label: East West
- Producer: Towa Tei

Towa Tei chronology
Sound Museum (1997)	Last Century Modern (1999)	Towa Tei (2002)

Singles from Last Century Modern
- 1. "A Ring" Released: May 1999; 2. "Let Me Know" Released: June 23, 1999; 3. "Funkin' for Jamaica" Released: June 18, 2001

Last Century Modern is the third studio album by Japanese music producer Towa Tei, released on July 28, 1999, by East West Records. It peaked at number 20 on the Oricon Albums Chart. The album was released in the United States on May 23, 2000, by Elektra Records.

== Critical reception ==
Professional ratings
Review scores
Source	Rating
AllMusic	4/5 stars
Pitchfork	7.4/10
Q	3/5 stars

Exclaim!'s Denise Benson described Last Century Modern as a "wonderfully eclectic" album that "solidifies [Tei's] reputation for creating fanciful, risky pop music."

== Track listing ==
No.	Title	Lyrics	Music	Length
1.	"Last Century Modern" (featuring Ua)	Towa Tei	Tei	2:48
2.	"A Ring" (featuring Pascale Borel)	Tei	Tei	3:08
3.	"Angel" (featuring Ayumi Tanabe and Viv)	Tei	Tei	4:56
4.	"Butterfly" (featuring Ayumi Tanabe)	Tei	Tei	4:04
5.	"Contact" (featuring Jumpin Jack Frost and Die; exclusive to Japanese edition)		Tei; Die	8:11
6.	"CHATR" (featuring CHATR)	Tei	Tei	2:33
7.	"Stretch Building Bamboo"		Tei	2:55
8.	"Congratulations!" (featuring Cory Daye)	Tei; James Harris III; Terry Lewis	Tei; Harris; Lewis	4:47
9.	"Funkin' for Jamaica" (featuring Joanne, Les Nubians, Wizdom Life, and Tom Browne)	Toni Smith	Browne	4:55
10.	"Let Me Know" (featuring Chara)	Tei; Chara	Tei	4:10
11.	"LCM"	Tei		1:48
Total length:				44:15

Australian, European, and Russian edition bonus tracks
No.	Title	Lyrics	Music	Length
11.	"Funkin' for Jamaica" (Shinichi Osawa remix)	Smith	Browne	7:27
12.	"Let Me Know" (Mighty Bop remix)	Tei; Chara	Tei	5:52
Total length:				49:23

US edition bonus tracks
No.	Title	Lyrics	Music	Length
11.	"Butterfly" (Cornelius remix)	Tei	Tei	4:06
12.	"Let Me Know" (Mighty Bop remix)	Tei; Chara	Tei	5:52
Total length:				46:02

== Charts ==
Chart (1999)	Peak position
Japanese Albums (Oricon)	20
