= Lucky (Towa Tei album) =

Studio album by Towa Tei
- Released: July 10, 2013
- Genre: Electronic
- Length: 38:16
- Label: Warner Music Japan
- Producer: Towa Tei

Towa Tei chronology
Sunny (2011)	Lucky (2013)	Cute (2015)

Professional ratings
Review scores
Source	Rating
ele-king	favorable

Lucky is a 2013 studio album by Towa Tei. It peaked at number 36 on the Oricon Albums Chart. The cover art was painted by Yayoi Kusama.

== Track listing ==
No.	Title	Length
1.	"Radio" (with Yukihiro Takahashi and Tina Tamashiro)	4:05
2.	"Blue for Girls, Pink for Boys"	3:23
3.	"Abbesses" (with Ayaka Nakata)	4:26
4.	"Kataburi"	2:52
5.	"Licht"	3:04
6.	"Terima Kasih"	3:00
7.	"Juxtapose"	2:56
8.	"Apple" (with Ringo Sheena)	3:56
9.	"Warm Jets"	3:58
10.	"Genius" (with Aoi Teshima)	3:15
11.	"Love Forever"	3:14

== Charts ==
Chart	Peak position
Japanese Albums (Oricon)	36
