= Sound Museum =

Studio album by Towa Tei
- Released: May 25, 1997
- Studio: VU; Free, Planet Kingdom, and Heart Beat (Tokyo); Chung King, Right Track, and Sound on Sound (New York)
- Genre: Shibuya-kei
- Length: 49:41
- Label: East West
- Producer: Towa Tei

Towa Tei chronology
Sweet Robots Against the Machine (1997)	Sound Museum (1997)	Last Century Modern (1999)

Singles from Sound Museum
- 1. "Happy" Released: June 25, 1997; 2. "GBI (German Bold Italic)" Released: September 10, 1997

Professional ratings
Review scores
Source	Rating
AllMusic	4.5/5 stars
Entertainment Weekly	A−
Pitchfork	7.1/10
Q	3/5 stars
Rolling Stone	3.5/5 stars

Sound Museum is the second studio album by Japanese music producer Towa Tei, released on May 25, 1997, by East West Records. Collaborators on the album include Kylie Minogue, Biz Markie, and Bebel Gilberto.

Sound Museum peaked at number 17 on the Oricon Albums Chart. By July 1997, it had sold over 100,000 copies.

== Track listing ==
No.	Title	Lyrics	Music	Producer(s)	Length
1.	"The Sound Museum"		Towa Tei	Tei; Toshihiko Mori^{[a]}; Ayumi Obinata^{[a]}	3:28
2.	"Time After Time" (featuring Viv and Amel Larrieux)	Viv	Tei	Tei; Fernando Aponte^{[a]}; Obinata^{[a]}; Mori^{[a]}	5:13
3.	"Happy" (featuring Viv and Bahamadia)	Viv; Bahamadia	Tei	Tei; Mori^{[a]}; Obinata^{[a]}	5:07
4.	"BMT" (featuring Biz Markie and Mos Def)	Biz Markie; Mos Def	Tei	Tei	3:28
5.	"Higher" (featuring Yavahn and Akiko Yano)	Yavahn	Tei	Tei	4:13
6.	"Corridor"			Tei; Mori^{[a]}	2:35
7.	"GBI (German Bold Italic)" (featuring Kylie Minogue and Haruomi Hosono)	Tei; Minogue	Tei	Tei	6:58
8.	"Tamilano"	Tei	Tei	Tei; François Kevorkian^{[a]}	4:17
9.	"Private Eyes" (featuring Bebel Gilberto)	Daryl Hall; Warren Pash; Sara Allen; Janna Allen	Hall; Pash; S. Allen; J. Allen	Tei	3:51
10.	"Everything We Do Is Music"	Tei	Tei	Tei	10:31
Total length:					49:41

Notes

- ^{^a} signifies an additional producer

Sample credits

- "Corridor" contains samples of "Hello Baby" and "Another Sound Museum" by Sweet Robots Against the Machine.

== Charts ==
Chart (1997)	Peak position
Japanese Albums (Oricon)	17

== Release history ==
Region	Date	Label	Ref.
Japan	May 25, 1997	East West	
Germany	February 24, 1998	Warner	
United States	February 24, 1998	Elektra	
