= Flash (Towa Tei album) =

Studio album by Towa Tei
- Released: April 2, 2005
- Genre: Electronic
- Length: 40:23
- Label: V2 Records
- Producer: Towa Tei

Towa Tei chronology
Towa Tei (2002)	Flash (2005)	Big Fun (2009)

Flash is a 2005 studio album by Japanese music producer Towa Tei. It peaked at number 26 on the Oricon Albums Chart. It includes the track "Sometime Samurai" featuring Kylie Minogue.

== Track listing ==
No.	Title	Length
1.	"Milky Way" (featuring Ryuichi Sakamoto and Yukalicious)	3:38
2.	"Sometime Samurai" (featuring Kylie Minogue)	3:58
3.	"Different Nu Nu"	5:44
4.	"Melody" (featuring Byron Stingily)	6:13
5.	"Risk Some Soul" (featuring Luomo)	4:33
6.	"Bianco" (featuring Arto Lindsay)	3:56
7.	"Red Carp Jumbo"	0:44
8.	"Congo" (featuring Atom TM)	3:41
9.	"Hunter Green"	3:11
10.	"My Sharona" (featuring Tycoon Tosh and Buffalo Daughter)	4:45

== Charts ==
Chart	Peak position
Japanese Albums (Oricon)	26
