= Hiroshi Takano =

- Born: December 14, 1964 (age 60)
- Origin: Mishima, Shizuoka Prefecture, Japan
- Genres: Rock, pop, synthpop, power pop
- Occupation(s): Singer-songwriter, record producer, arranger, multi-instrumentalist
- Instrument(s): Vocals; Guitars; Piano; Keyboards; Electric sitar
- Years active: 1986–present
- Labels: East World/Toshiba EMI; Agent Consipio/Pony Canyon; Five Stars; Universal Music Group/Milestone Crowds Records
- Website: Official

Hiroshi Takano (高野 寛, Takano Hiroshi) (born December 14, 1964) is a Japanese singer, composer, lyricist, music arranger, guitarist and producer. In the end of 1980s and early 1990s, he recorded some successful records which were produced by Todd Rundgren. He has contributed to the works of many musicians, such as Towa Tei and Ryuichi Sakamoto.

== Discography ==
=== Studio albums ===
Year	Album	Japanese albums chart	Producer(s)
1988	hullo hulloa	did not chart	Yukihiro Takahashi
1989	Ring	47	Hiroshi Takano, Takeshi Kobayashi
1990	Cue	2	Todd Rundgren
1991	Awakening	8	Todd Rundgren
1992	th@nks	20	Hiroshi Takano
1993	I	34	Hiroshi Takano, Tsuneo Imabori
1994	Sorrow and Smile	48	Hiroshi Takano, Towa Tei, Ryuichi Sakamoto
1996	Rain or Shine	80	Hiroshi Takano, Gota Yashiki
1999	tide	did not chart	Hiroshi Takano
2004	確かな光 (Tashika na Hikari)	125	Hiroshi Takano

=== Compilations ===
Year	Album	Japanese albums chart
1990	Better Than New (EP)	13
1992	Timeless Piece: The Best of	30
1997	Extra Edition	did not chart
2004	相変わらずさ(Aikawarazusa): Best Songs 1988–2004	174

=== Live album ===
Year	Album	Japanese albums chart	Producer
2000	Ride on Tide	did not chart	Hiroshi Takano
