= Future Listening! =

Studio album by Towa Tei
- Released: October 21, 1994
- Studio: VU; Sedic and Paradise East (Tokyo); Axis, Skyline, and Chung King (New York)
- Genre: Downtempo; Shibuya-kei
- Length: 52:39
- Label: For Life
- Producer: Towa Tei

Towa Tei chronology
Future Listening! (1994)	Sweet Robots Against the Machine (1997)

Singles from Future Listening!
- 1. "Technova" Released: March 1, 1995; 2. "Luv Connection" Released: September 12, 1995; 3. "Batucada" Released: 1996

Professional ratings
Review scores
Source	Rating
AllMusic	4.5/5 stars
Entertainment Weekly	A−
NME	6/10
Q	3/5 stars

Future Listening! is the debut studio album by Japanese music producer Towa Tei, released on October 21, 1994 by For Life Music. It is Tei's first release after his departure from Deee-Lite. The album was released in the United States on April 25, 1995 by Elektra Records.

Produced by Tei, Future Listening! includes collaborations with artists such as Joi Cardwell, Bebel Gilberto, Arto Lindsay, MC Kinky, Hiroshi Takano, Ryuichi Sakamoto, Haruomi Hosono, Toshihiko Mori, Satoshi Tomiie, Yuichi Oki of Tokyo Ska Paradise Orchestra, and Pizzicato Five vocalist Maki Nomiya. The album peaked at number 50 on the Oricon Albums Chart. Both "Luv Connection" (featuring Cardwell on vocals) and "Technova" (remixed by Josh Wink) were top 30 hits on the US Hot Dance Club Play chart in 1995.

In 2007, Rolling Stone Japan placed Future Listening! at number 59 on its list of the "100 Greatest Japanese Rock Albums of All Time". The 2007 reissue of the album peaked at number 73 on the Oricon Albums Chart.

== Track listing ==
No.	Title	Lyrics	Music	Length
1.	"I Want to Relax, Please!"		Towa Tei	4:11
2.	"Technova (Lá em Copacabana)"	Tei; Bebel Gilberto	Tei	5:46
3.	"Batucada"	Gilberto; Marcos Valle	Gilberto; Valle	3:27
4.	"Luv Connection"	Joi Cardwell	Tei	7:52
5.	"Meditation!"	Natasha Latasha Diggs	Tei	4:44
6.	"Raga Musgo"		Tei	1:45
7.	"Son of Bambi (Walk Tuff)"	Caron Geary	Tei; Toshihiko Mori	5:53
8.	"Amai Seikatsu (Lá Douce Vie)"	Tei; Yasuharu Konishi	Tei; Nokko	4:21
9.	"Obrigado"	Tei; Arto Lindsay	Tei	3:06
10.	"Dubnova (Part 1 & 2)"	Tei; Gilberto	Tei	11:44
Total length:				52:39

2007 Japanese reissue bonus disc – Future Recall 3
No.	Title	Length
1.	"Technova" (Opaz Flying High remix ver. 3)	7:21
2.	"Luv Connection (Towa's Dizzy Vibe)"	4:19
3.	"Batucada" (Soul Central Foot High mix)	7:29
4.	"Luv Connection" (Soul Central Classic mix)	8:21
5.	"Meditation!" (instrumental version)	4:43
6.	"Dubnova" (More Rockers remix)	6:18
7.	"Batucada" (Phill's Batucada Club remix)	6:17
8.	"Luv Connection" (Masters at Work dub)	9:34
9.	"Technova" (Drumagick remix)	5:34
10.	"Amai Seikatsu" (instrumental version)	4:15
Total length:		64:11

== Charts ==
Chart (1994)	Peak position
Japanese Albums (Oricon)	50
