= Kylie: La La La =

2002 photo/art book by Kylie Minogue

- Author: Kylie Minogue and William Baker
- Subject: Kylie Minogue
- Genre: Art
- Publisher: Hodder & Stoughton
- Publication date: 7 November 2002
- Publication place: United Kingdom
- Pages: 288
- ISBN: 0-340-73439-6
- OCLC: 50494879

Kylie: La La La (sometimes referred to by the simpler name La La La) is a photo/art book released by Australian singer Kylie Minogue. The book's namesake comes from a line made famous in her hit single "Can't Get You Out of My Head". It's not a traditional biography, but rather a pictorial biography that is a photographic look at the stylization of Kylie's career. The book features many photos, mostly outtakes from previous shoots. William Baker wrote the majority of the text in the book, however many sections include hand-written paragraphs by Kylie. Many of the included photos reveal a side to Kylie that is only ever seen by her friends and family.

La La La was completely reinvented for paperback publication. The paperback edition featured new pictures, copy, and a new cover. More specifically, the book was updated to include details of her Fever tour, which took place after the publication of the first edition.

== Background ==
The story is a biography of Minogue's career and early childhood life, spanning from 1968 to 2002. The story talks about her childhood, her career beginnings, her music career, relationships, and her time as a pop star and actress. Around the first chapter (entitled "The Disco Diva Next Door") it talks about her career as a soap actress in the TV series Neighbours and her career beginnings in music. The second chapter (entitled "Devil, You Know") talks about different matters; though she is still a singer, it talks about her change of persona from the girl next door to a more mature-sexual image, where she took full control of her image and music. It manages to talk about her relationship with her then-boyfriend, INXS singer Michael Hutchence.

In the other chapters, up until chapter eight, it talks about her independence of her music career, which her changing her imagery as well. Along with Minogue becoming a pop star, she became popular in the European and American markets.

In the chapter (entitled "Bottoms Up!") it talks about her career from 1999 to 2002. By the time she signed to Parlophone in 1999, she was ready to refresh her image along with her then-forthcoming record Light Years. It also talked about her becoming a "Pop Princess". Then, in the chapter 10 (entitled "La La La"), it mostly talked about her success with her album Fever and her worldwide hit single Can't Get You Out of My Head, which topped the charts in over 20 countries.

== Development ==
Over 200 pictures of Minogue had been published in the book, from her childhood days to her adult days. In the book, she stated that the photos are a "direct line from me to you [her fans]". According to her, she said "I've been involved in good, bad and ugly pictures, and they all have their place. Some will stand the test of time. Others just satisfy a superficial and passing space in a newspaper or magazine, but they are all powerful." Originally, the book was intended to be a picture book, featuring pictures of Minogue in her "photographs and various pictorial images", mostly relating to fashion and style.

However, she decided that it would have been better to add text to the book, saying "I decided that the pictures would benefit from some text to give them another aspect, shed some light on how they came to be or purely historical aside." With the sketches of her costumes for her tour, she said she had to find them in "endless boxes" to find them. Minogue also stated she didn't want this to be a "life story" saying "I was adamant that I didn't want this to become a life story, though it has become a biographical in content. I'm not ready for the whole shebang. I have long successfully avoided the almost inevitable autobiography."

The reason why she didn't want to reveal everything in the book was because she wanted to keep most of the things in her life private. La La La is currently the only biography book Minogue has written. She stated that every picture in the book shows an emotion and a story.

== Title and release ==
The title of the book, La La La, is a reference to Minogue's signature song and worldwide hit "Can't Get You Out of My Head". When the song starts with Minogue singing, she says "La La La", until it carries on, which is referenced from the book and song. The book was first released on 1 November 2002 in the United Kingdom, until it was released in early 2003 in Australia, New Zealand and some parts of North America. There are two artwork covers for the book. The first is a hard cover book and featured the cover that is similar to Minogue's single artwork for "What Do I Have to Do". The other is a softcover that has similar artwork to her 2004 compilation, Ultimate Kylie.

However, both books feature different pictures from each other, but some do feature the same.

The book was published in two versions:

- Kylie La La La, authors: William Baker & Kylie Minogue, publisher: Hodder & Stoughton, release date: 2002, 218 pages, softcover, nominal price indicated on the cover: £12.99, appearance of the cover, ISBN 0-340-73440-X
- Kylie: La La La, authors: William Baker & Kylie Minogue, publisher: Hodder & Stoughton, release date: 2002, >270 pages, hardcover, nominal price indicated on the cover: £20.00, appearance of the cover, ISBN 0-340-73439-6
