= Towa Tei =

Japanese musician (born 1964)

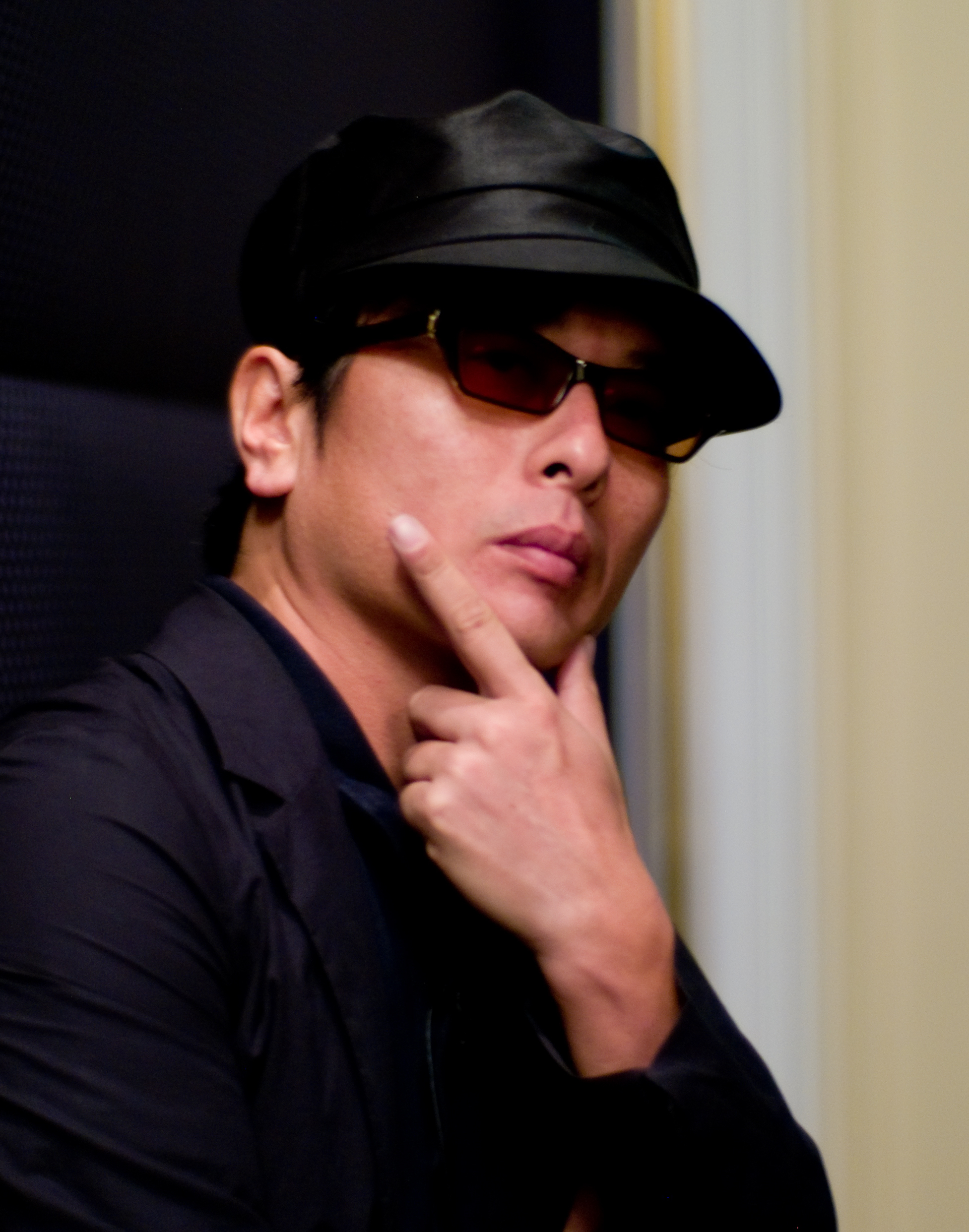
- Towa Tei in 2007

Background information
- Also known as: Sweet Robots Against the Machine
- Born: September 7, 1964 (age 62); Yokohama, Japan
- Origin: Tokyo, Japan
- Genres: Electronica; house; trip hop; shibuya-kei; big beat; drum and bass
- Occupations: Record producer; DJ
- Instruments: Keyboards; turntables
- Label: Elektra

Towa Tei (鄭 東和, Tei Tōwa; born September 7, 1964) is a Korean artist, record producer, and DJ. Born in Yokohama, Japan, Towa was a member of Deee-Lite, from the US label Elektra Records in 1990, notable for their international hit single, "Groove Is In the Heart". He made his solo debut with the album Future Listening! in 1994. He has since relocated from New York to rural Nagano Prefecture in Japan.

Towa's second studio album, Sound Museum (1997), became his highest charting effort at number 17 on the Oricon charts. Its single, "GBI (German Bold Italic)" featuring Kylie Minogue and Haruomi Hosono, reached number 50 and 63 in Australia and the United Kingdom, respectively. He saw continued success with 1999's Last Century Modern as its single, "Let Me Know" featuring Chara, peaked at number 34 in Japan, his highest entry.

Towa has collaborated with Ryuichi Sakamoto, Yukihiro Takahashi, Akiko Yano, Ringo Sheena, and Arto Lindsay, among others. His concept party, "Hotel H", started in 2009 as a social spot for music industry people in Tokyo.

== Biography ==
Towa is a third-generation Korean-Japanese. Towa began making demo tapes at the age of 16 having bought his first synthesizer, a Korg MS-10. While studying at Musashino Art University Junior College of Art and Design, he sent his tape to a radio program of Ryuichi Sakamoto titled Sound Street.

In 1987, Towa moved to the U.S. to study graphic design and joined house act Deee-Lite, a trio with Supa DJ Dimitry and Lady Miss Kier, enjoying almost instant success after debuting in 1990 with their album World Clique and the single "Groove Is In the Heart".

In 1991, Towa collaborated with his idol Ryuichi Sakamoto on Sakamoto's album Heartbeat. He also appeared on Sakamoto's follow up album Sweet Revenge.

In 1994, Towa returned to Japan after seven years in New York. He sustained a back injury falling from a stage during a performance with Deee-Lite in Brazil. While recovering, he began to drift toward other musical styles. He debuted as a solo act with Future Listening! that same year, incorporating an array of styles, including electronic, bossa nova, house, jazz and pop. It featured collaborations with Joi Cardwell, Bebel Gilberto, MC Kinky, Hiroshi Takano, Ryuichi Sakamoto, Haruomi Hosono, Toshihiko Mori, Satoshi Tomiie, Yuichi Oki of Tokyo Ska Paradise Orchestra and Pizzicato Five vocalist Maki Nomiya.

Sound Museum followed in 1997, then Last Century Modern in 1999. 2002 brought the album Towa Tei, under the pseudonym Sweet Robots Against the Machine. Flash surfaced in 2005 by which time Towa was DJing regularly in Japan. He has admitted, though, that he does not enjoy performing and prefers producing and using computers.

Big Fun, featuring Verbal and Mademoiselle Yulia, was released in 2009 and was the third album to feature the artwork of San Franciscan painter and graffiti artist Barry McGee. For the album, Towa utilized MySpace to collaborate with artists from around the world, even if he didn't know them, such as with German act Taprikk Sweezee. Another collaborator he worked with for Big Fun was Miho Hatori of Cibo Matto, though they also met only on MySpace.

Towa has established his own creative company, hug inc, which, among other things, manufactures his trademark sunglasses.

== Awards and nominations ==
Award	Year	Nominee(s)	Category	Result	Ref.
MTV Video Music Awards	1995	"Technova"	Viewer's Choice — MTV Japan	Nominated	

== Discography ==
- Future Listening! (1994)
- Sweet Robots Against the Machine (as Sweet Robots Against the Machine) (1997)
- Sound Museum (1997)
- Last Century Modern (1999)
- Towa Tei (as Sweet Robots Against the Machine) (2002)
- Flash (2005)
- Big Fun (2009)
- Sunny (2011)
- Lucky (2013)
- Cute (2015)
- Emo (2017)
- 3 (as Sweet Robots Against the Machine) (2018)
- LP (2021)
- Zoundtracks (2023)
- Touch (2023)
- Metallic Rouge (2023)
- AH!! (2025)
- Star Wars: Visions - The Song of Four Wings (2025)
- ZAMBIENT (2026)
