= Shinichi Osawa discography =

This is the discography for Japanese electronic musician Shinichi Osawa.

== Studio albums ==
List of albums, with selected chart positions
Title	Album details	Peak positions
Title	Album details	JPN
The One	Released: September 3, 2007; Label: Rhythm Zone; Formats: CD, digital download	43
SO2	Released: June 30, 2010; Label: Avex Trax; Formats: CD, digital download	—

== Extended plays ==
1994	Invisible Man
1995	Pieces from the Editing Floor

== As "Mondo Grosso" ==
List of albums, with selected chart positions
Title	Album details	Peak positions	Certifications
Title	Album details	JPN	Certifications
Mondo Grosso	Released: June 18, 1993; Label: For Life Music; Formats: CD, cassette, LP, digital download	—	—
Born Free	Released: October 20, 1995; Label: For Life Music; Formats: CD, digital download	—	—
Closer	Released: August 21, 1997; Label: For Life Music; Formats: CD, LP, digital download	—	—
MG4	Released: June 7, 2000; Label: Sony Music Associated Records; Formats: CD, cassette, LP, digital download	11	—
Next Wave	Released: June 25, 2003; Label: Sony Music Associated Records; Formats: CD, LP, digital download	10	* RIAJ: Gold
Nandodemo Atarashiku Umareru (何度でも新しく生まれる; "Reborn Again and Always Starting New")	Released: June 7, 2017; Label: Cutting Edge; Formats: CD, CD+DVD, digital download	8	—
Attune / Detune	Released: March 21, 2018; Label: Cutting Edge; Formats: CD, CD+DVD, digital download	46	—
Big World	Released: February 9, 2022; Label: Cutting Edge; Formats: CD, CD+Blu-Ray, digital download	18	—

== Live albums ==
1995	The European Expedition
2004	Live on the Next Wave (1 and 2)

== Remix albums ==
1996	Diggin' Into The Real
1998	The Man From The Sakura Hills
2000	Mondo Grosso Best Remixes
2001	MG4R
2003	Henshin
2008	The One+
2009	TEPPAN-YAKI – A Collection of Remixes

== Singles ==
1995	"Oh Lord, Let Me Do No Wrong"
1995	"Family"
1997	"Laughter in the Rain"
1997	"Everyday Life/Thing Keep Changin'"
2000	"Life" (feat. Bird)
2000	"Butterfly"
2000	"Now You Know Better"
2001	"Don't Let Go"
2002	"Blz"
2002	"Everything Needs Love" (feat. BoA)
2003	"Shinin'"
2003	"Hikari" (光; Light)
2007	"Our Song"
2008	"Star Guitar" (cover version of The Chemical Brothers' song)
2008	"Push"
2008	"Main Street Electrical Parade"
2009	"EEAA"
2009	"Love Will Guide You"
2014	"Main Street Electrical Parade" (extended mix)
2017	"ラビリンス" ("Labyrinth") (feat. Hikari Mitsushima)
2018	"False Sympathy" (偽りのシンパシー?) (feat. Aina the End)
2018	" 惑星タントラ" (feat. Asuka Saito (Nogizaka46) [vocals])
2022	"IN THIS WORLD" (feat. Ryuichi Sakamoto and Hikari Mitsushima [vocals])
2022	"STRANGER" (feat. Asuka Saito (Nogizaka46) [vocals])

== Collaboration albums ==
2011	Singapore Swing (with Paul Chambers)

== Compilation albums ==
2000	Sakurahills Disco 3000
2004	Make the Style 'drivin' slow'
2009	Teppan Yaki

== Mixtapes ==
2003	Fearless"THE HOUSE"
2004	Mix the Vibe～STREET KING～
2005	Fearless 4/4 Rockers
2006	Kitsune Udon

== Remix singles ==
2000	Jackson 5 – "Never Can Say Goodbye"
2005	Archie Shepp – "Blues For Brother George Jackson"
2006	Christopher & Raphael Just – "Popper"
2006	Plaid – "White's Dream"
2006	Anna Tsuchiya – "Ah Ah"
2007	Boys Noize – "Feel Good (TV = OFF)"
2007	Mighty Dub Kats – "Magic Carpet Ride 07'"
2007	鉄コン筋クリート – "White's Dream"
2007	Digitalism – "Pogo"
2007	Clazziquai Project – "Prayers"
2007	Bunny Lake – "Strobe Love"
2007	Kap10Kurt – "Dangerseekers"
2007	Thomas Anderson – "Washing Up"
2008	Ayumi Hamasaki – "Startin"
2008	Felix Da Housecat – "Radio"
2008	Rubies – "Stand In A Line"
2008	TVMR – "Bowie In The Bronx"
2008	De De Mouse – "Light Night Dance"
2008	The Subs – "Papillon"
2008	MINMI – "Perfect Vision"
2008	Popular Computer – "Lost & Found"
2008	The Whip – "Blackout"
2008	Cazals – "Poor Innocent Boys"
2008	Alex Gopher – "Aurora"
2009	Bag Raiders – "Turbo Love"
2009	Van She – "Kelly"
2009	Girl Next Door – "情熱の代償"
2009	DJ Ozma – "Masurao"
2009	Lost Valentinos – "Thief"
2009	The Young Punx – "Rock Star"
2009	Hac Mac – "B B Girls B B Boys"
2009	Benny Benassi vs. Iggy Pop – "Electro Sixteen"
2010	globe – "DEPARTURES"
2011	Vandroid – "We Exist"
2011	Ayumi Hamasaki – "Appears"
2012	moumoon – "Sunshine Girl"
2012	moumoon – "Chu Chu"
2012	Ayumi Hamasaki – "You & Me"
2013	The M Machine – "Tiny Anthem"
2013	Duck Sauce – "It's You"
2015	Sandaime J Soul Brothers – "Summer Madness"
2015	Faint Star – "Sly"
2015	Shihoko Hirata – "Pursuing My True Self" Persona 4: Dancing All Night OST

== Production discography ==
1997	Junior Sweet (for Chara)
1999	Bird (for Bird)
2000	Mindtravel (for Bird)
2005	nobuchikaeri (for Eri Nobuchika)
2008	WHAT A FEELING (for Namie Amuro)
2012	LADY MIND (for Nami Tamaki)
2012	Naked (for Namie Amuro)
2012	PARADISE (for Nami Tamaki)
2013	Heaven (for After School)
2014	Shh (for After School)
2023	Vanity (for Ai Otsuka)
