= Ice Cream Everyday =

Studio album by Amel Larrieux
- Released: October 1, 2013
- Genre: R&B; soul; neo soul
- Length: 68:06
- Label: Blisslife
- Producer: Laru Larrieux, Amel Larrieux

Amel Larrieux chronology
| Lovely Standards (2007) | Ice Cream Everyday (2013) |

Singles from Ice Cream Everyday
- 1. "Orange Glow" Released: March 3, 2009; 2. "Don't Let Me Down" Released: April 14, 2009; 3. "Afraid" Released: June 11, 2013

Ice Cream Everyday is the fifth studio album from singer-songwriter Amel Larrieux. Originally scheduled for release on August 23, the record was released on October 22, 2013, on her independent label Blisslife Records. It is her first album in six years following 2007's jazz covers project Lovely Standards and her first recording of all new material since 2006's Morning.

Ice Cream Everyday was produced by Amel's husband Laru Larrieux, who produced all of her studio albums during her solo career. The album was partially recorded and mixed by Eric "Ibo" Butler, who previously worked with Larrieux on the self-titled album by her former group Groove Theory as well as her second effort Bravebird.

The first single "Afraid" was released to radio on June 11, 2013.

== Track listing ==
All songs written by Amel Larrieux and Laru Larrieux.

1. "Afraid" – 4:45
2. "A Million Sapphires" – 3:40
3. "I Do Take" – 5:28
4. "You Don't See Me" – 3:28
5. "Ur the Shhh" – 4:45
6. "Berries and Cream" – 4:26
7. "Danger" – 4:34
8. "Moment to Reflect" – 4:27
9. "Have You" – 3:02
10. "Orange Glow" – 4:11
11. "See Where You Are" – 3:47
12. "Don't Let Me Down" – 4:36
13. "Trapped Being Human" – 4:26
14. "I Do Take 2" – 5:28
15. "Soon" – 2:37
16. "Danger 2" – 4:32

== Personnel ==
Credits adapted from liner notes.

- Amel Larrieux – vocals, piano, keyboards, bass, synths, executive producer
- Laru Larrieux – keyboards, synths, bass, drum programming, guitar, sounds, executive producer, recording engineer, mixing
- Keith Witty – bass
- Robin Macatangay – guitar
- Adrian Harpham – drums
- Thomas Piper, Jr. – synths, additional programming, electronic snare
- Bahnamous Bowle – piano, synth bass
- Sky Larrieux – bass, piano, additional vocals, additional mixing
- Sanji-Rei Larrieux – additional vocals
- Paul Frazier – bass
- Jeffery Connors – bass
- Sheldon Thwattes – drums
- Vincent Richardson – organ
- John Notar – organ
- George Laks – sounds
- Matt Castillo – recording engineer
- Eric "Ibo" Butler – recording engineer, mixing, additional programming
- Young Michael K "Success" Harris – recording engineer, mixing
- Josh Glunta – recording engineer (live drums)
- 8hz – recording engineer, mixing
- Michael Fossenkemper – mastering
- Mark Coston – art direction, design
- Timothy Hill – photography

== Charts ==
Chart performance for Ice Cream Everyday
| Chart (2013) | Peak position |
|---|---|
| US Top R&B/Hip-Hop Albums (Billboard) | 43 |
