= SO2 =

SO2 or SO_{2} may refer to:

== Science ==
- Sulfur dioxide (SO_{2}), a colorless gas with a pungent smell
  - Sulfonyl group (R-SO_{2}-R), a functional group found primarily in sulfones, or a substituent
- SO(2), special orthogonal group of degree 2 in mathematics
- Oxygen saturation (SO_{2}), the concentration of oxygen dissolved in a medium
- S2 (star) or S0–2, a star near the central black hole at the center of the Milky Way
- 2015 SO_{2} or 2015 SO2, an Aten asteroid

== Military and police ==
- SO2, a staff officer of the second class, often a commissioned officer of lieutenant commander, major or squadron leader rank
- SO2, a London Metropolitan Police Specialist Operations command division
- Special Operations 2 – Operational, of the British, World War II Special Operations Executive

== Other uses ==
- SO2 (album), a 2010 album by Shinichi Osawa

== See also ==
- Oxygen saturation (medicine) (SaO_{2}, SvO_{2}, StO_{2}, SpO_{2})
- Soso (disambiguation)
- Soo (disambiguation)
- SO (disambiguation)
