= Touch Me (Starley song) =

Single by Starley
- Released: 9 June 2017
- Genre: Electropop
- Length: 3:38
- Label: Tinted; Spinnin' Records
- Songwriter(s): Amel Larrieux; Bryce Wilson; Darryl Brown; Hector Medel; Starley Hope

Starley singles chronology
"Call on Me" (2016)	"Touch Me" (2017)	"Been Meaning to Tell You" (2017)

"Touch Me" is a song by Australian singer/songwriter Starley, released as a single on 9 June 2017.

In an interview with auspOp in August 2017, Starley said "'Touch Me' is about being in a relationship with someone and not getting comfortable. Find out what that person likes mentally, physically, etc. and make an effort to do that. Don’t let it get boring!"

The song is inspired by Groove Theory's 1995 single "Tell Me". Starley told Amnplify, "I happen to be friends with Bryce from Groove Theory and have always loved "Tell Me" so I asked him if I could create a 2017 version. With his blessing I got in the studio with my good friend and collaborator Hannibal Hector and rewrote it."

== Track listing ==
Original
No.	Title	Length
1.	"Touch Me"	3:38

Throttle remix
No.	Title	Length
1.	"Touch Me" (Throttle Remix)	3:07

Dom Dolla remix
No.	Title	Length
1.	"Touch Me" (Dom Dolla Remix)	5:00

acoustic
No.	Title	Length
1.	"Touch Me" (acoustic)	2:35

Kideko remix
No.	Title	Length
1.	"Touch Me" (Kideko Remix)	3:19

== Charts ==
Chart (2017)	Peak position
Australia (ARIA)	65
