= MG4 =

MG4 may refer to:

- MG4, Heckler & Koch firearm
- MG4, British NVC community category
- MG4 (album)
- MG4 EV, a battery electric compact car
- Denel MG4, a South African machine gun
