= Call on Me (Starley song) =

Single by Starley

from the album One of One
- Released: 29 July 2016; 13 October 2016 (Re-release)
- Genre: Electropop (original); EDM (Ryan Riback remix)
- Length: 2:41; 3:42 (Ryan Riback Remix)
- Label: Tinted; Epic; Sony
- Songwriters: Starley Hope; Peter Wadams
- Producers: Peter Wadams; Odd Mob

Starley singles chronology
| "Into You" (2016) | "Call on Me" (2016) | "Touch Me" (2017) |

Music videos
- "Call on Me" on YouTube; "Call on Me" (Ryan Riback remix) on YouTube

"Call on Me" is the debut single by Australian singer-songwriter Starley. The song was written by her and Peter Wadams. It was made available for digital download on 29 July 2016 through Tinted Records, and it was re-released through Tinted Records and Epic Records on 13 October 2016.

== Track listing ==
Digital download
| No. | Title | Length |
|---|---|---|
| 1. | "Call on Me" | 2:41 |

Remixes EP
| No. | Title | Length |
|---|---|---|
| 1. | "Call on Me" (Odd Mob Remix) | 2:57 |
| 2. | "Call on Me" (Edwynn x Tikal x Spirix Remix) | 2:40 |
| 3. | "Call on Me" (Ryan Riback Remix) | 3:15 |
| 4. | "Call on Me" (Hella Remix) | 4:05 |
| 5. | "Call on Me" (Raffa Remix) | 4:17 |
| Total length: | | 17:14 |

CD single
| No. | Title | Length |
|---|---|---|
| 1. | "Call on Me" | 2:41 |
| 2. | "Call on Me" (Ryan Riback Remix) | 3:42 |
| Total length: | | 6:23 |

== Remixes ==
The track was remixed by a number of DJs including Odd Mob, Edwynn x Tikal x Spirix, Ryan Riback, Hella and Raffa on the Call on Me (Remixes) EP.

== Charts ==
=== Weekly charts ===
| Chart (2016–17) | Peak position |
|---|---|
| Austria (Ö3 Austria Top 40) | 7 |
| Belgium (Ultratop 50 Flanders) | 8 |
| Belgium Dance (Ultratop Flanders) | 12 |
| Belgium (Ultratop 50 Wallonia) | 4 |
| Belgium Dance (Ultratop Wallonia) | 1 |
| Canada Hot 100 (Billboard) | 38 |
| Czech Republic Airplay (ČNS IFPI) | 8 |
| Denmark (Tracklisten) | 4 |
| Finland (Suomen virallinen lista) | 16 |
| France (SNEP) | 15 |
| France Airplay (SNEP) | 5 |
| Germany (GfK) | 7 |
| Germany Dance (Official German Charts) | 3 |
| Hungary (Single Top 40) | 39 |
| Ireland (IRMA) | 4 |
| Italy (FIMI) | 30 |
| Malaysia (RIM) | 19 |
| Mexico Airplay (Billboard) | 37 |
| Netherlands (Dutch Dance Top 30) | 2 |
| Netherlands (Dutch Top 40) | 3 |
| Netherlands (Single Top 100) | 5 |
| Norway (VG-lista) | 4 |
| Scottish Singles Sales (Official Charts) | 7 |
| Spain (Promusicae) | 44 |
| Switzerland (Schweizer Hitparade) | 8 |
| UK Singles (Official Charts) | 6 |
| US Billboard Hot 100 | 65 |
| US Adult Pop Airplay (Billboard) | 23 |
| US Hot Dance/Electronic Songs (Billboard) | 10 |
| US Pop Airplay (Billboard) | 20 |

Ryan Riback remix version

| Chart (2016–17) | Peak position |
|---|---|
| Australia (ARIA) | 8 |
| Czech Republic Singles Digital (ČNS IFPI) | 13 |
| New Zealand (Recorded Music NZ) | 8 |
| Poland Airplay (ZPAV) | 31 |
| Slovakia Singles Digital (ČNS IFPI) | 13 |
| Sweden (Sverigetopplistan) | 1 |

=== Year-end charts ===
| Chart (2016) | Position |
|---|---|
| Sweden (Sverigetopplistan) | 80 |

| Chart (2017) | Position |
|---|---|
| Australia (ARIA) | 37 |
| Austria (Ö3 Austria Top 40) | 39 |
| Belgium (Ultratop Flanders) | 31 |
| Belgium (Ultratop Wallonia) | 14 |
| Denmark (Tracklisten) | 28 |
| France (SNEP) | 28 |
| Germany (Official German Charts) | 44 |
| Hungary (Stream Top 40) | 32 |
| Italy (FIMI) | 72 |
| Latvia Airplay (LaIPA) | 35 |
| Netherlands (Dutch Top 40) | 14 |
| Netherlands (Single Top 100) | 27 |
| New Zealand (Recorded Music NZ) | 47 |
| Sweden (Sverigetopplistan) | 26 |
| Switzerland (Schweizer Hitparade) | 22 |
| UK Singles (Official Charts Company) | 27 |
| US Hot Dance/Electronic Songs (Billboard) | 20 |

== Certifications ==
| Region | Certification | Certified units/sales |
|---|---|---|
| Australia (ARIA) | 4× Platinum | 280,000^{‡} |
| Belgium (BRMA) | 2× Platinum | 40,000^{‡} |
| Canada (Music Canada) | 4× Platinum | 320,000^{‡} |
| Denmark (IFPI Danmark) | 2× Platinum | 180,000^{‡} |
| France (SNEP) | Diamond | 233,333^{‡} |
| Germany (BVMI) | 3× Gold | 600,000^{‡} |
| Italy (FIMI) | 2× Platinum | 100,000^{‡} |
| New Zealand (RMNZ) | 4× Platinum | 120,000^{‡} |
| Spain (Promusicae) | Gold | 20,000^{‡} |
| Sweden (GLF) | 5× Platinum | 200,000^{‡} |
| United Kingdom (BPI) | 2× Platinum | 1,200,000^{‡} |
| United States (RIAA) | Platinum | 1,000,000^{‡} |
^{‡} Sales+streaming figures based on certification alone.
