= Tell Me (Groove Theory song) =

1995 single by Groove Theory

Single by Groove Theory

from the album Groove Theory
- Released: June 23, 1995
- Genre: R&B
- Length: 3:56
- Label: Epic
- Songwriters: Bryce Wilson; Amel Larrieux; Darryl Brown; Rick James
- Producer: Bryce Wilson

Groove Theory singles chronology
"Tell Me" (1995)	"Keep Tryin'" (1996)

"Tell Me" is a song by American R&B duo Groove Theory from their debut album, Groove Theory (1995). The track is a cover of Rhythm-N-Bass' 1993 song "Tell Me (If You Want Me Too)", which was also produced by Bryce Wilson. The song contains an interpolation of Mary Jane Girls' "All Night Long" which itself interpolates Keni Burke's "Risin' to the Top".

Released as a single in June 1995, "Tell Me" peaked at numbers three and five on the US Cash Box Top 100 and Billboard Hot 100 charts. Additionally, it reached the top 10 in Australia, Canada and Israel, peaking at numbers six, eight and nine, respectively. The single also peaked at number 14 in New Zealand and number 31 in both Iceland and the United Kingdom. "Tell Me" is certified gold in Australia and the United States and silver in the United Kingdom.

== Music video ==
The accompanying music video for "Tell Me", directed by Daniela Federici, begins with Amel Larrieux and Bryce Wilson in a recording studio. Larrieux sings into the microphone, whilst Wilson produces behind the studio panel. Larrieux bops in front a city skyline in other scenes. In between scenes are transitional shots, which feature either Larrieux singing or Wilson nodding.

== Legacy ==
In 2003, Raymond & Co wrote "Playing Games", which was melodically inspired by "Tell Me". In 2017, Australian singer Starley wrote "Touch Me", which was also heavily inspired by "Tell Me".

Accolades for "Tell Me"
Publication	Accolade	Rank	Ref.
Pitchfork	The 53 Best R&B Songs of the ’90s	*	
Pitchfork	The 250 Best Songs of the 1990s	189	
Soul Bounce	Top 100 Soul/R&B Songs	46	

== Charts ==
=== Weekly charts ===
Chart (1995–1996)	Peak position
Australia (ARIA)	6
Canada Retail Singles (The Record)	8
Europe (Eurochart Hot 100)	61
Europe (European Dance Radio)	13
Iceland (Íslenski Listinn Topp 40)	31
Israel (Israeli Singles Chart)	9
New Zealand (Recorded Music NZ)	14
Scottish Singles Sales (Official Charts)	83
UK Singles (Official Charts)	31
UK Dance (Official Charts)	11
UK Hip Hop/R&B (Official Charts)	4
US Billboard Hot 100	5
US Hot R&B Singles (Billboard)	3
US Maxi-Singles Sales (Billboard)	2
US Top 40/Mainstream (Billboard)	21
US Top 40/Rhythm-Crossover (Billboard)	2
US Cash Box Top 100	3

=== Year-end charts ===
Chart (1995)	Position
US Billboard Hot 100	65
US Hot R&B Singles (Billboard)	38
US Maxi-Singles Sales (Billboard)	26
US Top 40/Rhythm-Crossover (Billboard)	37

Chart (1996)	Position
Australia (ARIA)	55
US Billboard Hot 100	58
US Hot R&B Singles (Billboard)	66
US Maxi-Singles Sales (Billboard)	41
US Top 40/Mainstream (Billboard)	52
US Top 40/Rhythm-Crossover (Billboard)	10

== Certifications ==
Region	Certification	Certified units/sales
Australia (ARIA)	Gold	35,000^{^}
United Kingdom (BPI)	Silver	200,000^{‡}
United States (RIAA)	Gold	500,000^{^}
^{^} Shipments figures based on certification alone.

== Release history ==
Region	Date	Format(s)	Label(s)	Ref.
United States	June 23, 1995	12-inch vinyl; CD; cassette	Epic	
United States	August 1, 1995	Rhythmic contemporary radio	Epic	
Australia	August 14, 1995	CD; cassette	Epic	
Australia	November 27, 1995	Remix CD	Epic	

== AXSHN version ==
On June 9, 2017, production group AXSHN released a version of the song featuring Mexican singer Sofia Reyes. Erica Russell from PopCrush described it as a "throbbing tropical dance banger". The reviewer also highlighted Reyes' voice, writing "Sofia's smooth, sultry vocals beckon to the dance floor like the reflection of the moon sparkling against the Caribbean Sea".
