= This Feeling =

This Feeling may refer to:

- "This Feeling" (Sam Brown song), a song by Sam Brown from the album Stop!
- "This Feeling" (The Chainsmokers song)
- "This Feeling" (IYES and Ryan Riback song)
- "This Feeling", a song by Alabama Shakes from the album Sound & Color by Alabama Shakes
- "This Feeling", a song by James Brown from the album Get Up Offa That Thing
- "This Feeling", a song by Frencheska Farr from the album Inside My Heart
- "This Feeling", a song by L'Tric; see List of number-one dance singles of 2015 (U.S.)
- "This Feeling", a single by Prince Malachi
- "This Feeling", a song by Puressence from the album Only Forever
- "This Feeling", a song by Skrewdriver from the album Freedom What Freedom
- "This Feeling", a song by Tinashe from the album In Case We Die
- "This Feeling", a song by Truth Hurts from the album Truthfully Speaking
