= Keep Tryin' =

"Keep Tryin'" or Keep Trying may refer to:

- Keep Tryin' (Groove Theory song)
- Keep Tryin' (Hikaru Utada song)
- "Keep Tryin'", a 1977 song by Mandré

== See also ==
- Keep On Trying (disambiguation)
