= Vanity (Ai Otsuka song) =

Single by Ai Otsuka

from the album Marble
- Language: Japanese
- Released: July 14, 2023
- Genre: Electronic music, J-pop
- Length: 3:22
- Label: Avex Trax
- Songwriters: Aio; Shinichi Osawa
- Producer: Shinichi Osawa

Ai Otsuka singles chronology
"Maybe I Love You" (2023)	"Vanity" (2023)	"Freeky" (2023)

Music video
- "Vanity" on YouTube

"Vanity" is a song by Japanese singer-songwriter Ai Otsuka, released as a digital single on July 14, 2023, through Avex Trax. The song was composed and produced by Shinichi Osawa, marking this as the first collaboration between these two artists.

== Background and release ==
"Vanity" is a collaborative track crafted by Shinichi Osawa specifically for Otsuka, to be part of her first collaborative EP, Marble, to commemorate her twentieth anniversary in the music industry.

Otsuka noted that upon hearing the demo sent by Osawa, she instantly felt the track was perfectly suited to her style, despite not having met Osawa in person during the production process. Osawa gave Otsuka creative freedom, allowing her to either use the demo’s placeholder lyrics or write her own. Otsuka stated that she wrote the lyrics for the song aiming to capture the "toxic" essence of the melody, and admitted she was initially worried about Osawa’s reaction to its unconventional lyrics, but was relieved when they were approved. The song includes a striking refrain in the chorus, featuring the phrase "Copipe Papapara Popipire Ripepara Po," which Otsuka described as inspired by her love for incantation-like phrases, influenced by films like Hayao Miyazaki's Castle in the Sky. Additionally, Otsuka drew lyrical inspiration from a conversation with producer Koji Tsutaya, who shared that he became fond of her after she appeared in his dream before they met. This anecdote influenced the song’s lyrical content, adding a personal touch to the composition.

Osawa, on the other hand, described the song as having a unique "destiny," born from an intuitive creative process influenced by his mood and timing. He aimed to create something distinct from Otsuka’s previous work, and he believes his goal was achieved. Notably, Osawa remarked that the track is unlike any of his past works yet stems from a latent part of his artistic sensibility, ultimately brought to life through Otsuka’s expressive performance. He expressed gratitude for the collaboration with Otsuka, noting that without this opportunity, the song’s concept might have remained unrealized.

The single was released digitally on major music streaming platforms on July 14, 2023, becoming the first release from the Marble EP. Upon its release, the song was described as a blend of "Osawa's signature sophisticated electro music with Otsuka's delicate vocals," which resulted in a "mysterious and immersive soundscape." The song became Otsuka's first single influenced by electronic music in approximately six and a half years, since "Watashi" released in 2017.

== Promotion ==
"Vanity" was selected as the opening theme song for Yu Yu Wonderland, a live-action drama adaptation of the popular manga of the same name by Mankitsu, which began airing on July 15, 2023, on TV Osaka and BS TV Tokyo.

== Track listing ==
Vanity - Digital release
No.	Title	Lyrics	Music	Length
1.	"Vanity"	Aio	Shinichi Osawa	3:22
