= Jolyon Petch =

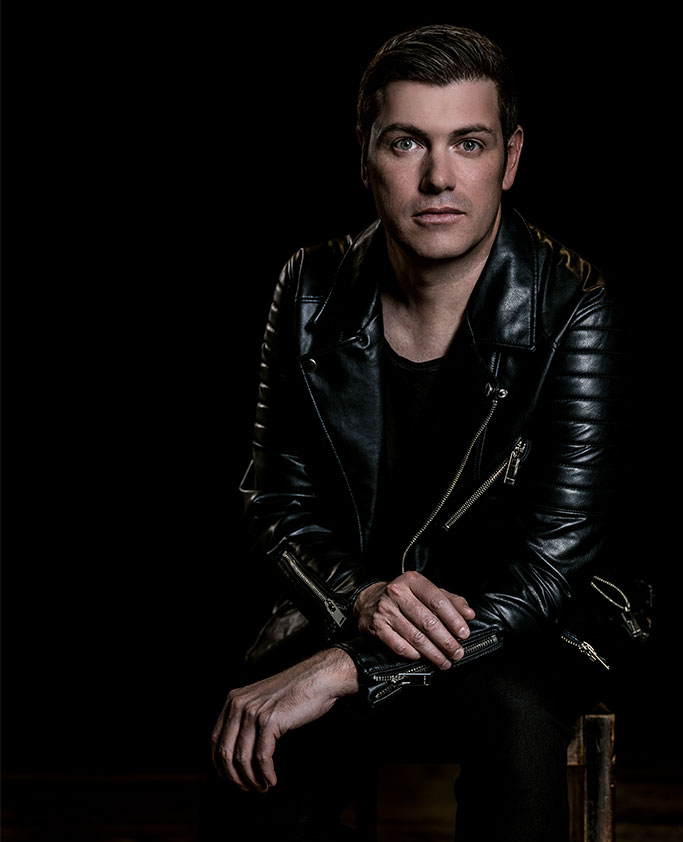
- Petch at Press Shot 2022

Background information
- Also known as: Elektrik Disko, YolaDisko
- Born: New Zealand
- Occupations: DJ, producer, remixer
- Years active: 2002–present
- Labels: Club Luxury, House Life
- Website: www.jolyonpetch.com

Jolyon Petch is a New Zealand-born, Australian-based DJ, producer and remixer, best known for his singles "Holding On" and "Dreams", which spent 3 weeks and 7 weeks respectively at number one on the Australian ARIA Club chart. Petch also released music under the aliases of Elektrik Disko, Auckland House Authority, Digital Remedy and YolaDisko.

As of 2023, he is the only New Zealand dance music producer to have produced over eleven number-one singles on the Australian ARIA Club chart. His breakthrough single "Dreams" also spent seven weeks at number one on the ARIA club chart, which gave the Kiwi producer his longest run at the top, making him the only New Zealander to ever accomplish this.

In 2022, his followup single to "Dreams" came out in September - "I Just Want Your Touch" which saw him collaborate with hit singer Starley. The single went straight to #1 on the ARIA club chart and held the top spot for five weeks consecutively plus adds to radio in Australia.

Petch's single "Spinning Around" was released on February 10, 2023, on TMRW Music and reached #1 on the ARIA Club Chart on its release day and has held the top spot for four weeks in a row. The track is a cover version of Kylie Minogue's "Spinning Around" and has received positive reviews for its upbeat energy and catchy chorus. The single reached #3 on the New Zealand Top 40 'Hot NZ Singles Chart' and also debuted at #40 on the hot 40 singles chart. October 2023 he was nominated for 'Best New Zealand Act' for the MTV Europe Music Awards for his original single 'Million Pieces'.

In November 2024, Petch released "Sunshine" in collaboration with Sheppard. The single peaked at #3 on the ARIA Club Chart. It received widespread national airplay, with A-rotation adds across the Hit Network (101.9 The Fox, 2Day FM), ARN Network, ACE Radio Network, and Fresh FM.

Petch also joined Sheppard as the official support act on their 2024 national Australian tour in support of their Zora album.

In April 2025, Petch released "Linger" featuring Tanya George. The single peaked at #3 on the ARIA Club Chart and debuted at #1 on the Hot NZ Singles Chart, marking his second #1 single on the New Zealand charts after "Dreams". In May 2025, "Linger" was also the second most added song on New Zealand radio, according to RadioScope.

His remixer credits include Troye Sivan, Freemasons, Robin Schulz, Nervo, Snoop Dogg, Oliver Nelson, Syke n' Sugarstarr, Junior Jack, Ron Carroll, Jason Herd, Calvo & Dazz, The Pet Shop Boys, Tobtok, Soul Avengerz, Conrad Sewell, Mel B, Carmen Electra, Jessica Sutta, Example and Starley.

== Career ==
His debut single "Calling 2002" was released via the One green apple compilation on Shock Records NZ in 2002 as J's Project featuring Hayley.

His 2017, "Otherside" ranked number one on the Beatport dance chart for over 50 days and stayed in the top 100 for over half a year.

In October 2019, Petch received the first clearance ever for publishing a cover version of Michael Jackson's single "Thriller". It peaked at number 8 on the ARIA Club chart and number 5 on the Beatport Dance chart.

In 2020, Petch partnered with Kid Crème for their single "How to Love Me". The single peaked at number one on the ARIA Club chart for 2 weeks and number 5 on the Music week UK Club chart.

In April 2021, Petch released a cover of Fleetwood Mac's "Dreams", which features uncredited vocals by Reigan Derry. The song became his first single to peak inside the ARIA top 50 singles chart. Starting in the month of August 2021, "Dreams" was the most played song on Australian radio, spending six weeks at the number one spot. The songs certified platinum in Australia in November 2021.

In 2021, his Elektrik Disko Music project released a cover of Bronski Beat's "Tell Me Why" which peaked at number one on the ARIA club chart for 3 weeks in June 2021.

In 2026, Petch collaborated under his Elektrik Disko alias with Russell Small, a founding member of Phats & Small and Freemasons, on "Tell Me", featuring Marina Davis. The single reached number one on the ARIA Club Tracks Chart.

== Discography ==
=== Singles ===
List of singles, with selected chart positions
Year	Title	Peak chart positions				Certifications
Year	Title	NZ	AUS	AUS Club	NZ Artists Hot	Certifications
2002	"Calling 2002" (as J's Project featuring Hayley )	—	—	—	—	
2009	"Hold Your Head Up" (as Sound Conducterz featuring Merenia Gillies)	—	—	—	—	
2010	"The Critters" (with Sam Hill)	—	—	—	—	
2010	"Bliss 2010" (with Sam Hill Vs. Th' Dudes)	—	—	—	—	
2010	"What Ya Got 2010" (with General Lee featuring Sherridan Leigh)	—	—	—	—	
2010	"Wrong"	—	—	—	—	
2010	"All I Do" (featuring Marqueal Jordan)	—	—	—	—	
2011	"Roxanne" (featuring The Secret Police)	—	—	—	—	
2011	"Bliss 2011" (with Sam Hill Vs. Th'Dudes)	—	—	—	—	
2011	"My Heart"	—	—	—	—	
2012	"SexyDancer" (with Sam Hill Vs. Katherine Ellis)	—	—	—	—	
2012	"Rise Up"/"The Music" (as Auckland House Authority)	—	—	—	—	
2012	"Roll wiv Me" (featuring Nicole Mitchell)	—	—	—	—	
2012	"Body On the Floor" (with Vince Harder and General Lee)	—	—	—	—	
2012	"Shaking That Ass (I See You Baby)" (with DJ Favorite)	—	—	—	—	
2013	"We Can Be Free" (with Greg Stainer)	—	—	—	—	
2013	"Lift Me Up" (featuring Nicole Mitchell)	—	—	—	—	
2013	"April Sun" (with Sam Hill featuring Riqi Harawira)	—	—	—	—	
2013	"Lights" (featuring Anikiko)	—	—	—	—	
2013	"Stay" (with Hannah Leigh)	—	—	—	—	
2013	"2 Soldiers" (with & Jotheo featuring Natalie Conway)	—	—	—	—	
2013	"We Got the Love" (with Ben Morris featuring Theory and Sarah C.)	—	—	—	—	
2013	"Right Now" (with Hannah Leigh)	—	—	—	—	
2013	"Another Universe" (with Natalie Conway)	—	—	—	—	
2013	"A Little Party Never Killed Nobody" (with DJ Favorite)	—	—	—	—	
2014	"Reach" (with Sian Evans)	—	—	—	—	
2014	"Feelin' Me"/"Always There" (as Sound Conducterz)	—	—	—	—	
2014	"Saxy Thang"	—	—	—	—	
2014	"Summer" (featuring Kings)	—	—	—	—	
2015	"Free" (with eSQUIRE and as PETCH featuring Esther Sparkes)	—	—	—	—	
2015	"Look for Me" (with Kid Crème)	—	—	—	—	
2015	"I Need a Miracle" (with Kings featuring Jamie Lee Wilson)	—	—	—	—	
2015	"Love Like This" (with eSQUIRE as PETCH featuring Leanne Brown)	—	—	—	—	
2015	"Rhythm Is a Dancer" (with eSQUIRE)	—	—	—	—	
2015	"Nothing Else" (with eSQUIRE as PETCH featuring NJ)	—	—	—	—	
2015	"All I Do" (with eSQUIRE as PETCH featuring Marqueal Jordan)	—	—	—	—	
2015	"Jumpin'" (with Mobin Master)	—	—	—	—	
2015	"Loneliness" (with Luca Debonaire)	—	—	—	—	
2015	"Fast Car" (featuring Livingstone)	—	—	3	—	
2016	"Feelin' Good" (with eSQUIRE as PETCH)	—	—	—	—	
2016	"Sweet Dreams" (with Andy Murphy)	—	—	8	—	
2016	"Losing My Mind" (as eSQUIRE and PETCH featuring Sian Evans)	—	—	—	—	
2016	"U Sure Do"	—	—	5	—	
2016	"Emotions" (as M1)	—	—	6	—	
2017	"You Can Call Me Al" (with Murph featuring Livingstone)	—	—	1	—	
2017	"Only You" (with Mind Electric featuring Kings)	—	—	7	—	
2017	"Boy In the Picture" (with Kid Crème featuring Sian Evans)	—	—	—	—	
2017	"Love the Way" (as Elektrik Disko)	—	—	—	—	
2017	"Otherside" (featuring GKCHP)	—	—	4	—	
2017	"If Everybody Looked the Same" (as M1)	—	—	8	—	
2018	"Everybody's Free (To Feel Good)" (as Elektrik Disko)	—	—	35	—	
2018	"So Shy" (as Elektrik Disko)	—	—	—	—	
2018	"Ain't Too Proud to Beg" (with Komes)	—	—	5	—	
2018	"Make a Move"	—	—	2	—	
2019	"Lover Lover" (with Digital Remedy)	—	—	1	—	
2019	"What Do You Feel" (with Mind Electric featuring Amy Pearson)	—	—	2	—	
2019	"Otherside 2019" (featuring GKCHP)	—	—	29	—	
2019	"Make Me Feel" (featuring J.D Davis)	—	—	—	—	
2019	"Africa" (as Lost Fields)	—	—	1	—	
2019	"You Come Along" (as YolaDisko)	—	—	—	—	
2019	"Rebel Love" (as Petch with Murph featuring Amy Pearson)	—	—	1	–	
2019	"Thriller" (featuring DaBeat)	—	—	8	—	
2020	"You Can't Play Around" (as YolaDisko)	—	—	10	—	
2020	"How to Love Me" (with Kid Crème)	—	—	1	—	
2020	"How Ya' Doin" (as YolaDisko)	—	—	—	—	
2020	"On My Mind" (with Digital Remedy)	—	—	7	—	
2020	"Best Part" (as Elektrik Disko)	—	—	9	—	
2020	"Show Me Love" (vs Robin S.)	—	—	1	—	
2020	"Umbrella"	—	—	3	—	
2021	"Holding On"	—	—	1	—	
2021	"Dreams"	27	16	1	1	ARIA: 2× Platinum
2021	"Tell Me Why" (as Elektrik Disko)	—	—	1	—	
2021	"My Destiny" (as Elektrik Disko)	—	—	2	—	
2022	"I Just Want Your Touch" (with Starley)	—	—	1	—	
2023	"Spinning Around"	—	—	1	3	
2023	"Million Pieces"	—	—	2	17	
2023	"Mr Brightside" (as Esquire & Petch)	—	—	2	—	
2023	"Fast Car 2024" (featuring Livingstone)	—	—	14	—	
2024	"Insomnia"	—	—	2	—	
2024	"Sunshine" (with Sheppard)	—	—	3	—	
2025	"Linger" (featuring Tanya George)	—	—	3	1	
2026	"Saving My Love"	—	—	5	—	
2026	"Tell Me" (as Elektrik Disko with Russell Small featuring Marina Davis)	—	—	1	—	

== Awards and nominations ==
=== ARIA Music Awards ===
The ARIA Music Awards is an annual ceremony presented by Australian Recording Industry Association (ARIA), which recognise excellence, innovation, and achievement across all genres of the music of Australia. They commenced in 1987.

Year	Nominee / work	Award	Result	Ref.
2021	"Dreams"	Best Dance Release	Nominated	
2022	"Dreams" (featuring Reigan)	Song of the Year	Nominated	
