= Get Up (Amel Larrieux song) =

1999 single by Amel Larrieux

Single by Amel Larrieux

from the album Infinite Possibilities
- Released: October 5, 1999
- Genre: R&B; neo soul
- Length: 4:04
- Label: 550 Music; Epic
- Songwriters: Amel Larrieux; Laru Larrieux
- Producers: Amel Larrieux; Laru Larrieux

Amel Larrieux singles chronology
"You Will Rise" (1996)	"Get Up" (1999)	"Sweet Misery" (2000)

Music video
- "Get Up" on YouTube

"Get Up" is a song recorded by American singer and songwriter Amel Larrieux. It was released on October 5, 1999 as the lead single from her debut solo studio album, Infinite Possibilities (2000). It was written by Larrieux and her husband, Laru Larrieux.

"Get Up" managed to enter the Billboard Hot 100 chart, peaking at number 97 and remains as Larrieux's only entry on the chart as a solo singer.

== Track listings ==
- CD, digital download, streaming
1. "Get Up"
2. "Get Up (Instrumental)"
- 12-inch
1. "Get Up"
2. "Get Up (Instrumental)"
3. "Get Up (Accapella)"
- Remixes, 12-inch
1. "Get Up (Remix) [featuring Puerto Rock]"
2. "Get Up (Livin' Proof Instrumental)"
3. "Get Up (Thread Had Fun Main Mix) [featuring Mos Def]"
4. "Get Up (Ron Trent Vox Mix 1)"
5. "Get Up (Dance Radio Mix)"

== Charts ==
Chart performance for "Get Up"
Chart (1999–2000)	Peak position
US Billboard Hot 100	97
US Hot R&B/Hip-Hop Songs (Billboard)	37
US Dance Club Songs (Billboard)	40
