= If I Were a Bell =

Song from the 1950 musical Guys and Dolls

"If I Were a Bell" is a song composed by Frank Loesser for his 1950 musical Guys and Dolls.

== Guys and Dolls ==
In the show Guys and Dolls, it is sung by the character Sister Sarah, originally performed by Isabel Bigley on Broadway, and memorialized on the original cast album. On a bet, Sky Masterson takes Sarah Brown to Havana to have dinner and gets her drunk. Sarah's stiff social barriers fall away and she realizes she is in love with Sky, and he with her. She sings this after they have an eventful dinner, but Sky refuses to take advantage of her drunkenness. It was also recorded by Lizbeth Webb who created the part in the original London production in 1953 at the London Coliseum.

== Miles Davis ==
It has become a jazz standard after it was featured by trumpeter Miles Davis, on the 1958 Prestige album Relaxin' with The Miles Davis Quintet. The Miles Davis Quintet featured tenor saxophone player John Coltrane, pianist Red Garland, bassist Paul Chambers, and drummer Philly Joe Jones. The song became a Miles Davis specialty and it appears on several live session recordings and compilations in different versions. The tune was taken up and performed by countless jazz musicians and is still a favorite in jam sessions.

=== The Cosby Show ===
The Miles Davis version was also used in the final scene of the final episode of The Cosby Show, when Cliff has rigged the doorbell outside to play the opening notes of the song. Then he and Clair dance off the set to it, breaking the fourth wall.

== Covers ==
- Petula Clark recorded a version for her 1966 My Love album.
- Holly Cole recorded it on her debut album Blame it on my Youth (1991).
- Bing Crosby recorded the song with Patty Andrews on September 7, 1950 and it appeared on the album Bing Crosby Sings the Song Hits from...
- Doris Day had a top-20 hit with her version recorded on September 28, 1950.
- Blossom Dearie recorded the song for her 1959 album Once Upon A Summertime, with one of the classic Oscar Peterson rhythm sections of Ed Thigpen and Ray Brown along with Mundell Lowe on guitar.
- Ella Fitzgerald recorded it for Ella Swings Lightly (1958).
- Red Garland recorded a version of this tune outside of Miles Davis' quintet for his album, Red Garland's Piano (1957).
- Chelsea Krombach sings it on her debut album, Profile (2004).
- Amel Larrieux covered this song on her May 2007 jazz standards album, Lovely Standards.
- In 2002, guitarist Chuck Loeb covered the song from his album, My Shining Hour.
- Dinah Shore covered the tune on the 1963 Reprise Musical Repertory Theatre album of Guys and Dolls
- Sarah Vaughan sang the song as a duet with Joe Williams, backed by the Count Basie Orchestra, on Count Basie/Sarah Vaughan.
- Dinah Washington covered it for her album In the Land of Hi-Fi (1956).
- Seth MacFarlane covered the song for his 2022 album Blue Skies.
- Gerald Clayton covered the song on his 2010 album Bond: The Paris Sessions.
