= Infinite Possibilities =

Studio album by Amel Larrieux
- Released: February 15, 2000
- Recorded: 1999
- Genre: R&B; neo soul; jazz
- Length: 47:57
- Label: 550 Music/Epic
- Producer: Amel Larrieux (exec.), Laru Larrieux

Amel Larrieux chronology
| Infinite Possibilities (2000) | Bravebird (2004) |

Singles from Infinite Possibilities
- 1. "Get Up" Released: October 5, 1999; 2. "Sweet Misery" Released: January 9, 2000; 3. "I N I" Released: March 20, 2000; 4. "Make Me Whole" Released: June 2000

Infinite Possibilities is the debut studio album from American R&B singer Amel Larrieux, released February 15, 2000, on 550 Music and distributed through Epic Records.

The album peaked at seventy-nine on the Billboard 200 chart.

== Release and reception ==
Professional ratings
Review scores
| Source | Rating |
|---|---|
| AllMusic | 3/5 stars |
| Entertainment Weekly | B+ |
| USA Today | 2.5/4 stars |

The album peaked at seventy-nine on the U.S. Billboard 200 and reached the twenty-first spot on the R&B Albums chart.

Derrick Mathis of AllMusic gave the album a good review, remarking that "as far as Larrieux's future is concerned, the possibilities are indeed, infinite."

== Track listing ==
| No. | Title | Music | Length |
|---|---|---|---|
| 1. | "Get Up" | Larrieux | 4:05 |
| 2. | "I N I" | Larrieux | 3:51 |
| 3. | "Sweet Misery" | Larrieux | 4:27 |
| 4. | "Searchin' for My Soul" | Larrieux | 3:46 |
| 5. | "Even If" | Larrieux | 4:39 |
| 6. | "Infinite Possibilities" | Larrieux | 4:19 |
| 7. | "Shine" | Larrieux | 4:43 |
| 8. | "Down" | Larrieux | 4:58 |
| 9. | "Weather" | Larrieux | 6:07 |
| 10. | "Make Me Whole" | Larrieux | 4:31 |

== Chart history ==
=== Album ===
| Chart (2000) | Peak position |
|---|---|
| U.S. Billboard 200 | 79 |
| U.S. R&B Albums | 21 |

=== Singles ===
| Year | Single | Peak chart positions | |
| Year | Single | U.S. Billboard Hot 100 | U.S. Hot R&B/Hip-Hop Singles & Tracks |
|---|---|---|---|
| 1999 | "Get Up" | 97 | 37 |
| 2000 | "Sweet Misery" | — | 81 |

"—" denotes releases that did not chart.

== Personnel ==
Information taken from Allmusic.

- drums (snare) – Janaki
- executive production – Amel Larrieux
- fender rhodes – Kwamé, Amel Larrieux
- keyboard bass – Amel Larrieux
- producer – Amel Larrieux, Laru Larrieux
- rainstick – Amel Larrieux
- vocals – Amel Larrieux
- vocals (background) – Amel Larrieux
