= Eri Nobuchika =

Eri Nobuchika 信近 エリ
- Born: August 3, 1985 (age 41)
- Origin: Fukuoka, Japan
- Genres: Japanese pop; Jazz; House; Easy listening
- Occupations: Singer; songwriter
- Years active: 2004–present
- Label: Sony Music Associated Records
- Website: nobuchika-eri.com

Eri Nobuchika (Japanese: 信近 エリ, Hepburn: Nobuchika Eri; born Nobuchika Eriko (信近 えり子), August 3, 1985) is a Japanese singer-songwriter, under the Fearless Records label on Sony Music Associated Records. She currently resides in Tokyo.

== Biography ==
=== Early years ===
Nobuchika's professional career began at an open Sony Music audition. She sent in her demo tape but forgot to include her address. The president of the audition wanted to contact her, and after asking for her through a few calls to Fukuoka post offices, he finally got hold of Nobuchika.

Through the audition, she attracted the interest of Shinichi Osawa. She received numerous label offers, but ultimately signed with Sony Music, and teamed up with Osawa. With Nobuchika on his label, Fearless Records, Osawa would go on primarily to produce her music as he did with fellow label artist bird.

=== 2004–2006: Debut and nobuchikaeri ===
After finishing high school at the age of 19, Eri started work on her debut single, "Lights", which was released on December 8, 2004. The single features the title song, as well as an acoustic version and a karaoke version. The B-track, "I hear the music in my soul", shows off Shinichi Osawa's underground club music background with Nobuchika providing a few vocals. "Lights" was the theme song of the Japanese film 深紅 (Shinku, or "The Deep Red") and the ending theme song for the anime Flag. The song was also featured on Q Entertainment's PlayStation Portable game Lumines: Puzzle Fusion (and its remake Lumines Remastered), along with "I hear the music in my soul." Many overseas fans discovered Eri through the game and it also helped launch her career in Japan.

Months later, on April 6, 2005, Nobuchika's second single, "Voice" was released. The song carries a Latin atmosphere with the use of Spanish guitars and carries more of Osawa's club sound. Along with the title song are a studio live version, a karaoke version, and a remix of "I hear the music in my soul." On Oricon's Top 100 chart, the single reached a peak of No. 94 and stayed on the charts for 3 weeks.

On June 29, 2005, "Sketch for Summer" was released, a very different genre compared to the previous singles. It was a mellow ballad with some hints of jazz. The single comes with a studio live version, a karaoke version, and a remix of "Voice." The music video was the first to show Nobuchika in color, rather than black and white. The single scored even lower on Oricon. It charted at No. 175 for just one week.

Eri's fourth single, "鼓動" (Kodou, meaning "heartbeat") was released on December 7, 2005, another ballad containing elements of acid jazz, with Eri accompanied by piano and horns. The song appeared in a TV commercial for the mobilecast mLink. "Kodou" is accompanied by a remix, a karaoke version, and a remix of "Sketch for Summer". The single was re-released two weeks later, replacing the karaoke version with an instrumental version with no background vocals.

Her debut album, nobuchikaeri, was released on December 21, 2005. It contained her four singles, as well as "I hear the music in my soul," and five new tracks. One of the tracks was Nobuchika's first recorded entirely in English. "Yume no Kakera" and "SING A SONG" were released as her first DVD single on March 1, 2006. The video for "Yume no Kakera" was created by Studio 4C, who also created animations for The Animatrix.

A 7-track album of remixes titled nobuchikaeri.rx was released on May 10, 2006. The album includes remixes of Nobuchika's singles by artists such as Röyksopp, Akufen, and more.

Nobuchika was featured in a radio program on the now-defunct bi-weekly Sony Music Japan vodcast "the swallowtail radio," in which she talked about her career, and read messages from fans.

=== 2006 to present: Independent work and Hands ===
After the release of nobuchikaeri.rx and Shinichi Osawa's move to Avex Trax in 2006, Nobuchika went into a lengthy hiatus with no releases.

An update on her blog told of a studio recording in Okinawa during the summer; this was eventually revealed as her collaboration with NAOTO, the leader of Japanese band Orange Range, in his solo project, delofamilia.

delofamilia's first album, quiet life, was released on December 5, 2007, featuring Nobuchika and AIR as guest vocalists, although Eri appears on the majority of the songs singing in mostly English and some Japanese. Nobuchika, NAOTO, and AIR all shared lyric-writing duties for the album.

In April 2009, Nobuchika announced that her second album, Hands, would be released on June 3, 2009, more than three years after her debut album. Nobuchika also launched her mixi account and a Myspace page with song samples, along with a live concert on release day to coincide with the new album. The album is to be distributed through independent record label Daiki Sound, and it contains eight tracks produced and written by a variety of artists, such as DSK from Port of Notes, The company, Yuu Sakai, and Ryuichiro Yamaki.

== Discography ==
=== Studio albums ===
List of albums, with selected chart positions
Title	Album details	Peak positions
Title	Album details	JPN Oricon
Nobuchikaeri	Released: December 21, 2005; Label: Sony Music Associated Records; Formats: CD	65
Hands	Released: June 3, 2009; Label: Hills Records; Formats: CD, digital download	—
III: Three	Released: November 2, 2016; Label: Avex Music Creative Inc.; Formats: CD, digital download	232
"—" denotes items that did not chart.

=== Remix albums ===
Title	Album details
Nobuchikaeri.rx	Released: May 10, 2006; Label: Sony; Formats: CD, vinyl set

=== Singles ===
List of singles, with selected chart positions
Title	Year	Peak chart positions	Album
Title	Year	JPN Oricon	Album
"Lights"	2004	78	Nobuchikaeri
"Voice"	2005	94	Nobuchikaeri
"Sketch for Summer"	2005	175	Nobuchikaeri
"Kodō" (Note: Japanese: 鼓動; "Pulse")	2005	—	Nobuchikaeri
"Yume no Kakera" (Note: Japanese: 夢のかけら; "Dream Pieces") (Note: DVD single.)	2006	—	Nobuchikaeri
"—" denotes items that did not chart or items that were ineligible to chart due to format.

==== Promotional singles ====
List of singles, with selected chart positions
Title	Year	Peak chart positions	Album
Title	Year	JPN Hot 100 Adult	Album
"Kimi Nan da" (Note: Japanese: きみなんだ; "You")	2009	95	Hands
"Kimi no Koe o" (Note: Japanese: 君の声を; "Your Voice")	2016	—	III: Three
"Hello"	2016	—	III: Three
"—" denotes items which did not chart.
