= Keep On Trying =

Keep On Trying may refer to:

- "Keep On Tryin'", a song by Twenty 4 Seven from the album I Wanna Show You
- "Keep On Trying", a song by Curiosity Killed the Cat from the album Getahead
- "Keep On Trying", a song by Garland Jeffreys from the album One-Eyed Jack
- "Keep On Trying", a song by Osibisa from the album Ojah Awake
- "Keep On Trying", a song by Slaughter and the Dogs from the album Do It Dog Style
- "Keep On Trying", a song by the Strawbs from the album Burning for You
- "Keep On Trying", a song by The Outsiders (Dutch band)
- "Keep On Trying", a song composed by Papa Charlie McCoy
- "Keep On Trying (Sechs Freunde)", a song by British Sea Power from the album Let the Dancers Inherit the Party
- Keep On Trying, an album by Emma Russack and Lachlan Denton

== See also ==
- Keep Tryin' (disambiguation)
