= Maybe I Love You =

Single by Ai Otsuka
- Language: Japanese
- Released: May 31, 2023
- Genre: J-pop
- Length: 3:28
- Label: Avex Trax
- Songwriter: Aio

Ai Otsuka singles chronology
"Smily 2" (2022)	"Maybe I Love You" (2023)	"Vanity" (2023)

Music video
- "Maybe I Love You" on YouTube

"Maybe I Love You" is a song by Japanese singer-songwriter Ai Otsuka, released as a digital single on May 31, 2023, through Avex Trax.

== Background and release ==
The song was first announced and performed live at Otsuka's Love Is Born: 19th Anniversary 2022 concert, held on September 11, 2022, at the Hibiya Park Outdoor Concert Hall in Tokyo. During the concert, Otsuka introduced "Maybe I Love You" as a previously unreleased song, inviting guitarists Simon Isogai and Yohei Makabe to join her on stage. Noting the song's origins in the spring, she described it as having a "gentle, spring-like scent." Upon the airing of the concert on Wowow in November 2022, Otsuka tweeted that the song had "no plans for release or streaming."

In May 2023, however, it was announced that the song had been commissioned as a collaboration song with Chikako Mitsuhashi's long-running manga series Chiisa-na Koi no Monogatari. An animated video featuring the song was published on YouTube on June 10, 2023. Both the video and the digital cover artwork for the single features a collaboration with Chiisa-na Koi no Monogatari, incorporating visuals inspired by the manga's iconic aesthetic. The live version from Love Is Born was subsequently also uploaded to YouTube on June 17, 2023.

The Love Is Born: 19th Anniversary 2022 live album was released on the same day. Apart from including the live recording of the song in said concert, its limited edition includes a bonus CD which includes the studio version of "Maybe I Love You".

== Composition and themes ==
"Maybe I Love You" is a medium-tempo ballad which showcases "[Otsuka's] delicate vocals and a bittersweet yet warm atmosphere [...] with lyrics about love that anyone can easily relate to emotionally." The song's arrangements, handled by Shin Sakiura, were described as "rich and layered", resulting in a track "with an emotional melody line and a striking rhythm."

== Track listing ==
Maybe I Love You - Digital release
No.	Title	Writer(s)	Length
1.	"Maybe I Love You"	Aio	3:28
