= Lovely Standards =

Studio album by Amel Larrieux
- Released: May 22, 2007
- Recorded: 2006–2007; Quad Recording Studios (New York City, New York)
- Genre: Jazz; soul
- Label: Blisslife
- Producer: Amel Larrieux, Laru Larrieux (also executive)

Amel Larrieux chronology
Morning (2006)	Lovely Standards (2007)	Ice Cream Everyday (2013)

Singles from Lovely Standards
- 1. "If I Were a Bell" Released: 2007

Professional ratings
Review scores
Source	Rating
Entertainment Weekly	(C)
PopMatters	(6/10)

Lovely Standards is the fourth studio album by American R&B-soul singer-songwriter Amel Larrieux, released in the United States on May 22, 2007, by Blisslife Records. It consists of a collection of covers of Great American Songbook jazz standards.

== Background ==
In an interview with Nu-Soul Magazine in late April 2009, Larrieux said of the album: "[W]e knew that it was gonna be a real niche album. It was gonna be about people that were truly loyal to me as an artist and willing to go wherever I was going." She went on to say that the album is geared toward people who "really do like jazz for jazz, not because the artist that they know is doing it, but they listen to jazz and they're understanding of being experimental within that form." Larrieux continues, referring to husband and producer Laru Larrieux: "We purposely only pressed up a small amount of albums, and you know, didn't go huge with it. We kind of wanted to feel our way around it, and view it as a kinda small intimate thing."

== Track listing ==
1. "If I Were a Bell" (Frank Loesser) – 3:20
2. "Try Your Wings" (Michael Barr, Dion McGregor) – 3:17
3. "Lucky to Be Me" (Leonard Bernstein, Adolph Green, Betty Comden) – 5:01
4. "Wild Is the Wind" (Dimitri Tiomkin, Ned Washington) – 2:57
5. "Shadow of Your Smile" (Johnny Mandel, Paul Francis Webster) – 2:53
6. "You're My Thrill" (Jay Gorney, Sidney Clare) – 3:34
7. "Younger Than Springtime" (Richard Rodgers, Oscar Hammerstein II) – 4:50
8. "Something Wonderful" (Rodgers, Hammerstein) – 3:31
9. "If I Loved You" (Rodgers, Hammerstein) – 3:03
10. "I Like the Sunrise" (Duke Ellington) – 4:54

== Original versions ==
Song	Original performer	Year
"If I Were a Bell"	Isabel Bigley	1950
"Try Your Wings"	Blossom Dearie	1958
"Lucky to Be Me"	John Battles	1944
"Wild Is the Wind"	Johnny Mathis	1957
"The Shadow of Your Smile" (retitled "Shadow of Your Smile")	Johnny Mandel	1965
"You're My Thrill"	Ward Silloway	1933
"Younger Than Springtime"	William Tabbert	1949
"Something Wonderful"	Terry Saunders	1956
"If I Loved You"	John Raitt and Jan Clayton	1945
"I Like the Sunrise"	Duke Ellington and His Orchestra	1949

== Personnel ==
=== Musicians ===
- Amel Larrieux – vocals
- Adrian Harpham – drums
- Keith Witty – strings, double bass

=== Production ===
- Amel Larrieux – arranger
- Laru Larrieux – producer, executive producer, arranger
- Kwame Harris - recorded music
- Joe Ferla – mixing
- Mark Wilder – mastering
- Ruvén Afanador – photography

== Charts ==
Chart (2007)	Peak position
U.S. Billboard 200	195
U.S. Billboard Top R&B/Hip-Hop Albums	32
U.S. Billboard Top Jazz Albums	3
U.S. Billboard Top Independent Albums	22

== Release history ==
Country	Date	Label
United States	May 22, 2007	Blisslife
Canada	May 22, 2007	Blisslife
United Kingdom	June 4, 2007	Blisslife
Germany	October 9, 2007	Blisslife
