= Ryan Riback =

- Born: Ryan Riback; 19 September 1981 (age 44); Johannesburg, South Africa
- Origin: South Africa
- Genres: Electro house; pop; trap; Melbourne bounce; tropical house
- Occupations: DJ; record producer; remixer
- Instruments: keyboards; Ableton; piano
- Years active: 2000–present
- Labels: Spinnin'; Kontor Records; Discowax; Liberator Records; BMG; Cloud 9 Records; Happy Music France; Sweat It Out; Ultra Music; Ministry of Sound; RBCK Records
- Website: ryanriback.com

Ryan Riback (born 19 September 1981), is an Australian DJ, record producer and remixer based in Caulfield, Victoria. Ryan Riback is most known for his remix of Australian pop artist, Starley's debut single "Call on Me" which exceeded triple platinum status in Australia, and platinum in the US.

== Musical career ==
Ryan Riback started his music career by taking piano lessons as a child. At the age of 16, his uncle gave him a Roland MC-303 Groovebox. From there he began learning FL Studio and experimenting with other DAWs until settling on Ableton. In 2006 Ryan commissioned his first remix, "Soon" by Telmo. Since that time Ryan has become an in demand remixer, commissioning remixes for Starley, Maroon 5, Fifth Harmony, Andy Grammer, Terror Jr etc.

In January 2017 Ryan released his own version of "All That She Wants" via Cloud 9 Music. His debut single came shortly thereafter in June 2017 with the release of "One Last Time" featuring the vocals of Some Chick. The record was released via Ryan's label RBCK Records and licensed and signed to Spinnin', Kontor Records, Discowax, Liberator Records and BMG.

== Discography ==
=== Singles ===
Title	Year	Album
2017	"One Last Time" (featuring Some Chick)	Non-album singles
2017	"GO 2.0" (with Burak Yeter)	Non-album singles
2017	"Do You Care" (featuring Iselin)	Non-album singles
2018	"Papercuts" (with Reed featuring Sunset City)	Non-album singles
2018	"This Feeling" (with IYES)	Non-album singles
2019	"Kinder Eyes" (featuring Ryann)	Non-album singles
2021	"(Just Can't) Hate U" (featuring Dotter)	Non-album singles

=== Remixes ===
- 2010 Daft Punk – "Derezzed" (Ryan Riback's Tron Guy Remix)
- 2016 Starley – "Call on Me" (Ryan Riback Remix)
- 2016 Maroon 5 – "Don't Wanna Know" (Ryan Riback Remix)
- 2016 Fifth Harmony – "That's My Girl" (Ryan Riback Remix)
- 2016 Fergie – "Life Goes On" (Ryan Riback Remix)
- 2016 Starley - "Call on Me" (Ryan Riback Remix)
- 2017 Kelly Clarkson – "Love So Soft" (Ryan Riback Remix)
- 2017 Lauv – "I Like Me Better" (Ryan Riback Remix)
- 2017 JP Cooper – "She's on My Mind" (Ryan Riback Remix)
- 2017 Jennifer Hudson – "Remember Me" (Ryan Riback Remix)
- 2017 Clean Bandit – "Rockabye" (Ryan Riback Remix)
- 2017 Andy Grammer – "Fresh Eyes" (Ryan Riback Remix)
- 2017 LANY – "ILYSB" (Ryan Riback Remix)
- 2017 Terror Jr – "Come First" (Ryan Riback Remix)
- 2018 MKTO – "How Can I Forget" (Ryan Riback Remix)
- 2018 Armin van Buuren featuring Josh Cumbee – "Sunny Days" (Ryan Riback Remix)
- 2018 MIKA featuring Pharrell Williams – "Celebrate" (Ryan Riback Remix)
- 2018 R3hab and Jocelyn Alice - "Radio Silence" (Ryan Riback Remix)
- 2018 AJR featuring Rivers Cuomo - Sober Up (Ryan Riback Remix)
- 2019 Walk the Moon - "Timebomb" (Ryan Riback Remix)
- 2019 Against The Current - "Almost Forgot" (Ryan Riback Remix)
- 2020 LittGloss - "L.A. Traffic" (Ryan Riback Remix)
