= Amel Larrieux =

American singer-songwriter

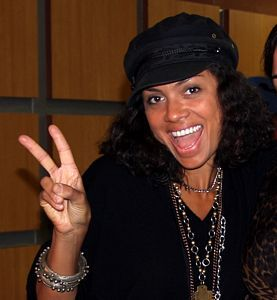
- Larrieux in San Diego on October 30, 2008

Background information
- Born: Amel Eliza Stowell; March 8, 1973 (age 53); New York City, U.S.
- Genres: R&B; soul; neo soul; jazz
- Occupations: Singer; songwriter; record producer
- Instruments: Vocals; keyboards
- Years active: 1991–present
- Labels: 550; Epic; Blisslife
- Formerly of: Groove Theory

Amel Eliza Larrieux (née Stowell; born March 8, 1973) is an American singer-songwriter, musician and keyboardist. Larrieux rose to fame in the mid-1990s as a founding member of the duo Groove Theory along with Bryce Wilson. After leaving the group in 1999, she released her debut solo album, Infinite Possibilities, the following year on Epic Records.

In late 2003, Larrieux and her husband, producer Laru Larrieux, founded the independent label Blisslife Records, on which she has released four albums so far. Larrieux cites Ella Fitzgerald, Prince, Sade, Rickie Lee Jones, Stevie Wonder, Shawn Colvin, Chaka Khan, John Lennon, Patrice Rushen, Jimi Hendrix, and Joni Mitchell as her musical influences.

== Life and career ==
=== Early life ===
Larrieux was born Amel Eliza Stowell on March 8, 1973, in New York City.

=== Groove Theory ===
In 1991, Larrieux met Mantronix member Bryce Wilson at Rondor Music. Wilson, who wanted to begin his solo career as producer and musician, was looking for a vocalist to work with. Wilson and Larrieux began to produce demos together and subsequently formed the duo Groove Theory. Their debut release, Groove Theory, spawned several radio hits such as "Tell Me", "Keep Tryin'", and "Baby Luv". The duo were also featured in successful motion picture soundtracks such as 1996's Sunset Park and 1997's Love Jones. Larrieux, pursuing a solo career, would not be involved in the duo's eventually-shelved second album The Answer. Makeda Davis would step in as lead singer in 1999 until Groove Theory officially disbanded in 2001. Larrieux said of leaving the group, "You have to make a bunch of compromises and .. you know, I just couldn't go on forever. We wanted different things and a combination of that and the label wanting different things from us just made me decide that it was time to move on."

=== Solo career ===
In 1996, Larrieux was featured on the self-titled debut album of Sade's backing band Sweetback, yielding the single "You Will Rise", which reached number 42 on the Hot R&B/Hip-Hop Songs chart.

Larrieux co-wrote and co-produced her debut solo album Infinite Possibilities, released in February 2000 on Epic Records, along with husband Laru Larrieux; the album reached number 79 on the Billboard 200 and number 21 on the Top R&B/Hip-Hop Albums, and produced the hit "Get Up", her highest-charting solo hit to date.

Larrieux parted ways with Epic Records after this CD. "I was asked to tone it down as a solo artist, which is one of the reasons why I was really glad to leave the major label where I was signed", she said. Husband Laru Larrieux, who had been co-writing and producing most of Amel's material, started the independent label Blisslife Records with her to distribute her music.

In 2001, Larrieux covered "Sophisticated Lady" with artist Clark Terry for the Red Hot Organization's compilation album Red Hot + Indigo, a tribute to Duke Ellington, which raised money for various charities devoted to increasing AIDS awareness and fighting the disease.

On November 10, 2010, Larrieux spoke about going independent, saying, "This is the right time [to be independent]. People are more hip to the internet. People are more open to what independent means." She went on to say that black independent artists are too under the radar.

Her second album Bravebird was released under Larrieux's independent label Blisslife Records label on January 20, 2004. While it underperformed on the Billboard 200, it peaked at number 28 on the Top R&B/Hip-Hop Albums and number five on Independent Albums. It spawned the midtempo radio single "For Real", which showcases her ability to utilize the whistle register and inspired Ebony magazine to rave about her "ethereal high-octave vocals that bring to mind Minnie Riperton. A portion of the album's seventh track, "Giving Something Up", could be heard in the commercial for BET's HIV/AIDS awareness campaign Rap-It-Up, in which Larrieux participated in September 2003.

Larrieux's collaboration with Stanley Clarke and Glenn Lewis, a cover of Roberta Flack and Donny Hathaway's 1972 song "Where Is the Love" from Clarke's 2003 album 1, 2, To the Bass, received a nomination for Best R&B Performance by a Duo or Group with Vocals at the 2004 Grammy Awards.

Larrieux's third album Morning was released in April 2006 and features the single "Weary", which reached number 29 on the Billboard Hot Adult R&B Airplay chart in May 2006. Morning is her highest-charting album to date, peaking at number 74. The song "No One Else", written for Mike Shaunessy, was featured on the soundtrack to Tyler Perry's 2007 film Why Did I Get Married?.

In May 2007, Larrieux released an album of jazz standard covers titled Lovely Standards. It broke into the top five of the Top Jazz Albums and sold 3,700 units in its first week of release.

Larrieux was featured on 2Pac's 2007 greatest hits album Best of 2Pac Part 1: Thug, on the previously unreleased song "Resist the Temptation".

On February 4, 2010, SoulSummer.com announced that Larrieux is currently in the studio with Bryce Wilson working on Groove Theory's second official album. The duo had their first live show together in years on October 7, 2010, in Tokyo, Japan. Larrieux said of the show, "Tokyo was too fly, as usual. The audiences just got better and better." Larrieux said in a November 2010 interview that she and Wilson are currently looking for a label they feel comfortable with. As of August 2011 Larrieux stated Groove Theory have not recorded any new material.

In March 2009, Larrieux released the songs "Orange Glow" and "Don't Let Me Down" from her fifth studio album, Ice Cream Everyday, to iTunes and other online music stores. Larrieux also contributed "Don't Let Me Down" to the Enough Project. Proceeds from the compilation fund efforts to make the protection and empowerment of Congo's women a priority, as well as inspire individuals around the world to raise their voice for peace in Congo. Larrieux said on October 19, 2010 that she was "dutifully" trying new things for her fifth studio album. In August 2011, Larrieux confirmed through Power Player Magazine the release date for her new album to be late January 2012. When asked about the five-year delay on her fifth album, Larrieux said she wanted to add and delete more songs to perfect the final product. "I stay on the road a lot", she said. "My experiences inform me as a writer, so then I come back and I have more songs to write, and I keep adding and subtracting, so the editing process made this album take a little bit longer than I expected."

Larrieux's song "Don't Let Me Down" was used in the 2014 film Beyond the Lights.

== Discography ==
=== Studio albums ===
Title	Album details	Peak chart positions					
Title	Album details	US	US R&B/HH	US R&B	US Indie	US Jazz	JPN
Infinite Possibilities	Released: February 15, 2000; Label: 550, Epic; Formats: LP, CD, digital download	79	21	—	—	—	—
Bravebird	Released: January 20, 2004; Label: Blisslife; Formats: CD, digital download	166	28	—	5	—	149
Morning	Released: April 25, 2006; Label: Blisslife; Formats: CD, digital download	74	8	—	5	—	—
Lovely Standards	Released: May 22, 2007; Label: Blisslife; Formats: CD, digital download	195	32	—	22	3	—
Ice Cream Everyday	Released: October 22, 2013; Label: Blisslife; Formats: CD, digital download	—	43	20	—	—	—
"—" denotes a recording that did not chart or was not released in that territory.

=== Singles ===
Title	Year	Peak chart positions			Album
Title	Year	US	US R&B	US Adult R&B	Album
"You Will Rise" (Sweetback featuring Amel Larrieux)	1996	—	42	20	Sweetback
"Get Up"	1999	97	37	10	Infinite Possibilities
"Sweet Misery"	2000	—	81	30	Infinite Possibilities
"I N I"	2000	—	—	—	Infinite Possibilities
"Make Me Whole"	2000	—	—	—	Infinite Possibilities
"Now You Know Better" (Mondo Grosso featuring Amel Larrieux)	2000	—	—	—	MG4
"For Real"	2004	—	45	22	Bravebird
"Weary"	2006	—	—	29	Morning
"If I Were a Bell"	2007	—	—	—	Lovely Standards
"Orange Glow"	2009	—	—	—	Ice Cream Everyday
"Don't Let Me Down"	2009	—	—	—	Ice Cream Everyday
"Afraid"	2013	—	—	13	Ice Cream Everyday
"—" denotes a recording that did not chart or was not released in that territory.

==== Promotional singles ====
Title	Year	Album
"Glitches (The Skin You're In)" (with The Roots)	2001	Red Star Sounds Volume One: Soul Searching

=== Guest appearances ===
Title	Year	Other artist(s)	Album
"Suspended In Time"	1995	Group Home	Livin' Proof
"Gaze"	1996	Sweetback	Sweetback
"Live for the Love"	1996	Reign	Indestructible
"Time After Time"	1997	Towa Tei, Viv	Sound Museum
"It's Luv"	1997	Deja Gruv	Luv Jonz
"Guidance"	2000	Guru	Guru's Jazzmatazz: Streetsoul
"Now You Know Better"	2000	Mondo Grosso	MG4
"Glitches"	2001	The Roots	Down to Earth: Music from the Motion Picture
"Sophisticated Lady"	2001	Clark Terry	Red Hot + Indigo
"Believe in Love"	2001	—N/a	Epic Records: A Season of Soul and Sounds
"I Don't Know"	2002	Soulive	Next
"What's Come Over Me?"	2002	Glenn Lewis	Barbershop: Music from the Motion Picture
"Where Is the Love"	2003	Stanley Clarke, Glenn Lewis	1, 2, To the Bass
"No One Else"	2007	—N/a	Tyler Perry's Why Did I Get Married?: Music from and Inspired by the Motion Picture
"Resist the Temptation"	2007	2Pac	Best of 2Pac Part 1: Thug

=== Music videos ===
Title	Year	Director(s)
"You Will Rise" (Sweetback featuring Amel Larrieux)	1996	Polish Brothers
"Get Up"	1999	Floria Sigismondi
"Sweet Misery"	2000	Earle Sebastian
"Glitches (The Skin You're In)" (with The Roots)	2001	Nzingha Stewart
"For Real"	2004	Sanaa Hamri
"Weary"	2006	Jon Menefee and 8 Hertz
