= Morning (Amel Larrieux album) =

Studio album by Amel Larrieux
- Released: April 21, 2006
- Recorded: 2005–2006; Blisslife Studios (Santa Monica, California); Little World Studios (Brooklyn, New York City, New York)
- Genre: R&B; soul; neo soul
- Label: Blisslife
- Producer: Laru Larrieux

Amel Larrieux chronology
Bravebird (2004)	Morning (2006)	Lovely Standards (2007)

Singles from Morning
- 1. "Weary" Released: April 4, 2006; 2. "No One Else" Released: 2007

Professional ratings
Review scores
Source	Rating
About.com	4/5 stars
Allmusic	4.5/5 stars
Entertainment Weekly	(positive)
PopMatters	(9/10)
Starpulse.com	4/5 stars

Morning is the third studio album by American R&B-soul singer-songwriter Amel Larrieux, released in the United States on April 25, 2006. Larrieux's second album released on her own independent label, Blisslife Records, it peaked at number seventy-four on the Billboard 200 and number eight on the Top R&B/Hip-Hop Albums, becoming the singer's highest-charting solo album on both charts to date. The album spawned the singles "Weary", which charted at number twenty-nine on the Billboard Hot Adult R&B Airplay and "No One Else", which was included on the soundtrack to Tyler Perry's 2007 film Why Did I Get Married?

== Track listing ==
All songs written by Amel Larrieux and Laru Larrieux.

1. "Trouble" – 2:47
2. "Unanswered Question" – 3:34
3. "No One Else" – 3:24
4. "Earn My Affections" – 3:35
5. "Weary" – 3:52
6. "Morning" – 3:46
7. "Gills and Tails" – 4:59
8. "Magic" – 4:02
9. "Just Once" – 3:36
10. "Mountain of When" – 4:38

== Personnel ==
=== Musicians ===
- Amel Larrieux – vocals, keyboards
- Laru Larrieux – acoustic guitar, percussion, keyboards, sounds, instrumentation
- Carlos Henderson – bass, double bass
- Chris Parks – guitar
- Daniel Walker – Gadulka

=== Production ===
- Amel Larrieux – art direction, stylist
- Laru Larrieux – producer, engineer, drum programming, art direction
- Dave Isaac – engineer, mix engineer
- Kwame "Young MIchael K Success" Harris – engineer, mixing
- Mark Coston II – art direction, design
- Carlos Henderson – overdubs
- Chris Parks – overdubs

== Charts ==
Chart (2006)	Peak position
U.S. Billboard 200	74
U.S. Billboard Top R&B/Hip-Hop Albums	8
U.S. Billboard Top Independent Albums	5

== Release history ==
Country	Date	Label
United Kingdom	April 21, 2006	Blisslife
United States	April 25, 2006	Blisslife
Canada	April 25, 2006	Sonic Unyon
Australia	April 26, 2006	Blisslife
Japan	August 18, 2006	Pony Canyon
Germany	September 20, 2007	Blisslife
