= Bird (singer) =

Japanese singer (born 1975)

bird
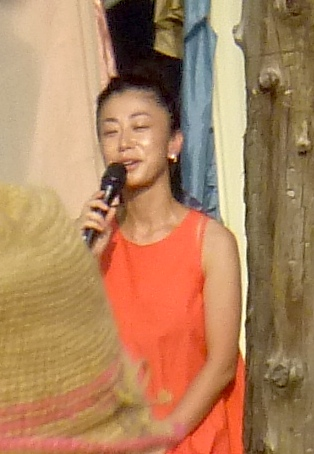

Background information
- Origin: Japan
- Genres: J-pop, Jazz, R&B, Pop
- Years active: 1990s-present
- Labels: RealEyes (1999-2001); Sony Music Entertainment Japan (2002-2006); Universal J (2007-2009); Sony Music Japan (2011-)
- Website: Official Website

Bird, stylized as bird (born December 9, 1975, as Yuki Kitayama (北山有紀)), is a Japanese singer.

== History ==
Kitayama graduated from the Notre Dame Academy, a girls-only high school in the Kansai region. She then attended Kansai University and graduated with a degree in sociology. While she was in university, she was a member of the school's light music club.

After graduating, she spent a year in New York City. Returning to Osaka in the late 1990s, she started her singing career by performing at various jazz clubs. After achieving fame in the locality, she was discovered by record producer Shinichi Osawa, better known as Mondo Grosso.

In 1998, Kitayama was featured in Zeebra's Mirai e no Kagi (Osawa's Realized Mix) released in the mini-album The Rhyme Animal Remix EP.1. She came up with the alias bird around this time, because her head resembled a bird's nest during her debut. Moreover, she expressed that she wanted her music to echo the song of small birds.

On March 20, 1999, she released her first single Souls on Osawa's label RealEyes. In July of the same year, bird released her first eponymously titled album on the Sony Music Japan label, which sold over 700,000 copies and won her the award of Japan Gold Record for Newcomers.

After RealEyes became independent from Sony Records, bird was able to become the lyricist and producer for her own music.

She is married to illustrator Jun Miura.

== Discography ==
=== Singles ===
	Release date	Title	Chart position
1st	March 20, 1999	SOULS	44
2nd	June 30, 1999	BEATS	27
3rd	August 25, 1999	君の音が聴こえる場所へ	76
4th	October 6, 1999	空の瞳	14
5th	December 1, 1999	満ちてゆく唇	70
6th	January 21, 2000	SOULS （Peach Bossa Mix）	
7th	April 1, 2000	GAME	25
	May 1, 2000	LIFE; MONDO GROSSO feat bird	
8th	September 27, 2000	オアシス	24
9th	November 22, 2000	マインドトラベル	73
10th	January 31, 2001	マーメイド3000	82
11th	7 March 2001	桜	
12th	August 22, 2001	flow	42
13th	December 5, 2001	ZERO	73
14th	February 6, 2002	私的パートナー	80
15th	April 24, 2002	散歩しよう	
16th	August 21, 2002	フラッシュ	
17th	September 10, 2003	チャンス	144
18th	July 22, 2004	ハイビスカス	155
19th	September 1, 2004	髪をほどいて	
20th	August 24, 2005	童神	140
21st	June 28, 2006	ファーストブレス	
22nd	October 4, 2006	SPARKLES	199
	29 November 2006	君が笑う方へ; Taiji All Stars feat bird	
23rd	July 11, 2007	BATUCADA	44
24th	July 23, 2008	サマーヌード/ダンシング・シスター	
	March 13, 2010	Soul Shine; Baker Brothers feat bird	
	December 3, 2022	Sea of Love	
	June 7, 2023	夏のクラクション	
	July 24, 2024	MONDO GROSSO「LIFE feat. bird (2024 re-edit)」	

=== Albums ===
	Release date	Title	Chart position
1st	July 23, 1999	bird	8
	November 10, 1999	bird －LIMITED SILVER EDITION	8
2nd	November 22, 2000	MINDTRAVEL	5
3rd	March 6, 2002	極上ハイブリッド	11
4th	October 8, 2003	DOUBLE CHANCE	22
5th	September 23, 2004	vacation	46
6th	October 4, 2006	BREATH	50
7th	May 25, 2011	NEW BASIC	
8th	March 20, 2013	Home	
9th	September 25, 2013	9	
10th	November 4, 2015	Lush	
11th	March 20, 2019	波形	
	June 19, 2024	bird e.p. (12inch vinyl Release)	

=== Other albums ===
	Release date	Title	Chart position
Live	May 23, 2001	LIVE! tour 2000+1	21
Best Of	September 28, 2005	bird's nest	27
Cover Album	November 28, 2007	BIRDSONG EP -cover BEATS for the party-	66
Cover Album	August 6, 2008	MY LOVE	69
Best Of	September 24, 2008	Free Soul Collection	246
Best Of	April 29, 2009	covers	
Best Of	March 20, 2013	bird's nest 2013	
Best Of	June 12, 2013	bird's best 2013	
Best Of	July 7, 2019	bird 20th Anniversary Best	
Best Of	September 18, 2024	bird 25th anniv. re-edit best + SOULS 2024	

=== VHS・DVD ===
Release date	Title
VHS、DVD; March 23, 2000	tour 1999 live!
VHS、DVD; May 23, 2001	bird tour 2000+1 live
VHS、DVD; September 19, 2001	bird clips! #1
DVD; October 9, 2005	bird LIVE! '04-'05
