= Soso =

Soso, So-so, or So so may refer to:

- Boris Michel Soso (1917-2002), American actor and film producer better known as Brad Dexter
- Soso, Mississippi, town in the United States
- Soso (search engine) (搜搜) a Chinese search engine site owned by Tencent Holdings Limited
- Soso, a childhood nickname of Joseph Stalin (1878 - 1953)
- Julie Soso (born 1960), Papua New Guinean politician
- Soso (born Wang Chingyi, 2001), Taiwanese singer and member of South Korean girl group GWSN
- Soso, nickname of Sophia Somajo (born 1985), Swedish musician
- Soso people of West Africa
- SO-SO, a Japanese beatboxer, looper, singer-songwriter and producer
- So So, a nickname for Southwest Center City, Philadelphia, a neighbourhood in Philadelphia
