= Odd Mob =

Music duo

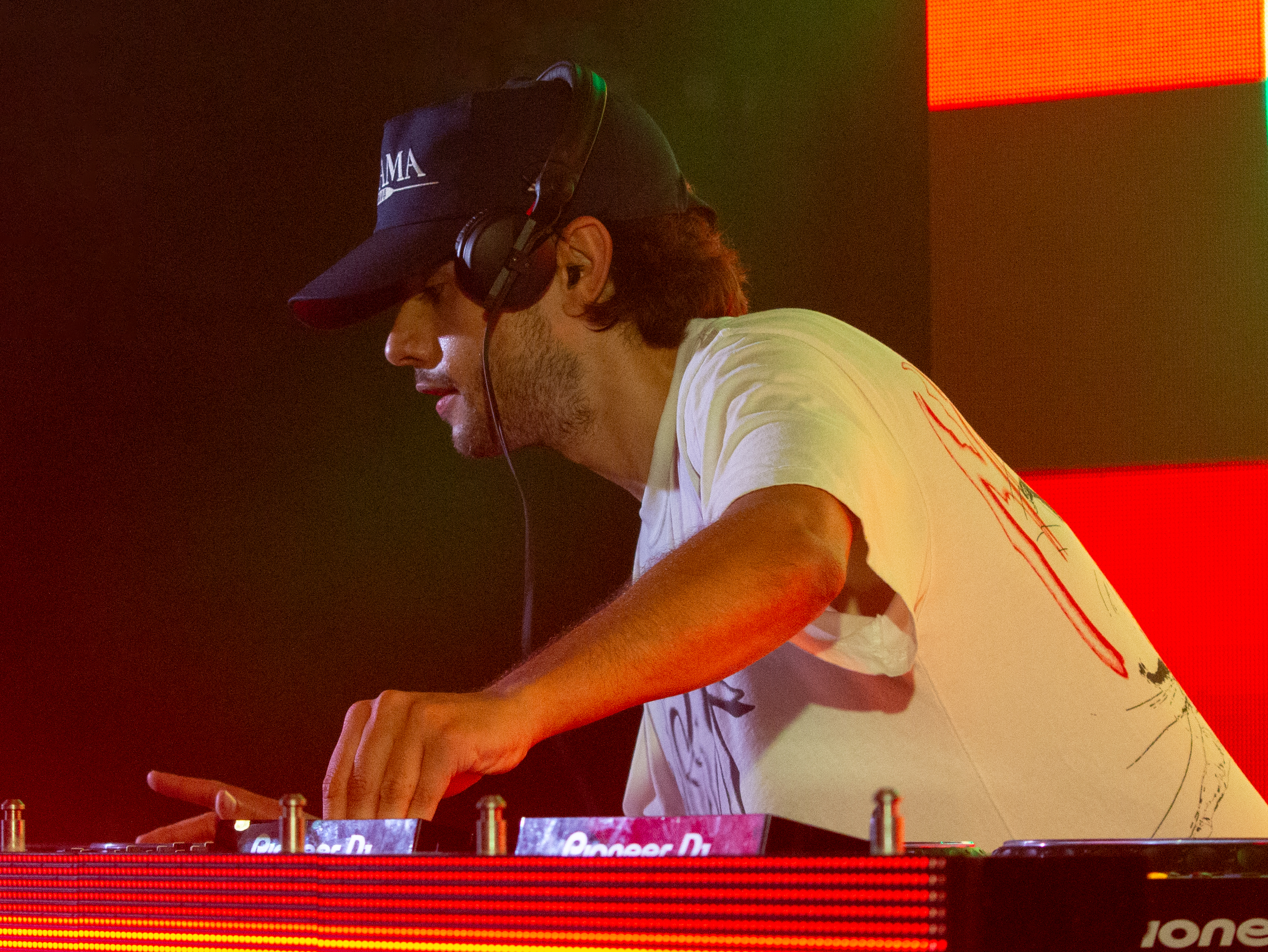
- Hope performing in February, 2026

Background information
- Born: 1993 (age 32–33)
- Origin: Brisbane, Queensland, Australia
- Genres: EDM, house
- Years active: 2013–present
- Labels: Central Station; Tinted Records
- Members: Harry Hope
- Past members: Robbie Jacobs
- Website: oddmb.com

Harry Hope, better known as Odd Mob, is an Australian DJ and record producer. Odd Mob was originally a duo, which included Hope and Robbie Jacobs; the latter left the duo in 2017. Odd Mob is most well known for the viral hit "Is It a Banger?", which placed at number 70 in the 2014 Triple J Hottest 100, and "Left to Right", which has since amassed over 8.8 million streams on Spotify alone, gaining support from the likes of Skrillex, Fred Again, Dom Dolla, Disclosure, Diplo and Chris Lake.

== Career ==
Odd Mob released their first single "The Tribe" in 2013, which was followed by "Jungla" in 2014. In September 2014, Odd Mob made a breakthrough with the track "Is It a Banger?", which became a viral hit and was voted into the Triple J Hottest 100, 2014. The song has since garnered over 8 million streams across various platforms.

In October 2015, Odd Mob released their debut EP, titled Diverse Universe.

In 2017, Jacobs left the band and Hope continued Odd Mob as a solo project.

The 2022 single "Left to Right" marked a significant return to the spotlight, receiving support from figures like Skrillex, Fred Again, Dom Dolla, Disclosure, Diplo, and John Summit. The track, based on portions of Soulja Boy's hit song "Crank That", was praised by Soulja Boy himself.

Odd Mob experienced his most significant year to date in 2023, undertaking multiple back-to-back tours across North America and performing in major cities and festivals such as EDC, Coachella, Hard Summer, Shambhala, and Sunset Music Festival. Additionally, Odd Mob secured a spot at the BMO Stadium alongside John Summit and Mau P on 16 December. Odd Mob was also ranked in 42nd position in the 2023 1001 Tracklist Top 100 Producer poll. That year, he released "XTC" and official remixes for artists including Hayden James, Martin Solveig, Jax Jones, and D.O.D.; his catalog extends to bootlegs under the Oddities brand. Later that year, he released "Losing Control" on John Summit's Experts Only imprint, which accumulated 1.5 million streams in the first two weeks across all platforms.

In 2024, Odd Mob released a club remix of Sean Paul's "Get Busy", gaining support from Fisher, Diplo, and Dom Dolla. The remix was certified Gold by Australian Recording Industry Association (ARIA) in 2025. Additionally, Odd Mob released a remix of John Summit's "Palm of My Hands", reaching the Beatport's number 1 spot within a week of the remix's release

In 2025, Odd Mob announced his first Australian headline tour, with the first stop at the Metro Theatre in Sydney and stops in Perth, Brisbane and Melbourne. Odd Mob released "Won’t Be Possible", a single alongside Dutch DJ Tiesto and English producers, Goodboys

== Discography ==
=== Extended plays ===
Title	EP details
Diverse Universe	Released: 16 October 2015; Label: Tinted Records; Formats: Digital download
Diffusion	Released: 16 October 2015; Label: Tinted Records; Formats: Digital download
Club Rompas	Released: 28 July 2023; Label: Tinted Records; Formats: Digital download

=== Charted singles ===
Title	Year	Peak chart positions		Album
Title	Year	AUS Club	US Dance/Mix Show	Album
"Marshmellow"	2015	36	—	Non-album singles
"Into You" (featuring Starley)	2016	1	—	Non-album singles
"Gassed Up"	2016	8	—	Non-album singles
"Feel So Good"	2017	1	—	Non-album singles
"Intrinsic"	2018	28	—	Non-album singles
"Won't Be Possible" (with Tiёsto and Goodboys)	2025	—	1	Non-album singles

=== Remixes ===
List of notable "Fisher remixes" singles, with year released and certifications
Title	Year	Peak chart positions	Certifications
Title	Year	AUS	Certifications
"Get Busy" (with Sean Paul	2024	—	ARIA: Gold
"—" denotes a recording that did not chart or was not released.

== Awards and nominations ==
=== AIR Awards ===
The Australian Independent Record Awards (commonly known informally as AIR Awards) is an annual awards night to recognise, promote and celebrate the success of Australia's Independent Music sector.

Year	Nominee / work	Award	Result	Ref.
2019	"Intrinsic"	Best Independent Dance, Electronica Or Club Single	Nominated	
2024	"Losing Control" (with Omnom)	Best Independent Dance, Electronica Or Club Single	Nominated	
2025	"Vertigo" (featuring Ed Graves)	Best Independent Dance, Electronica or Club Single	Nominated	

=== Queensland Music Awards ===
The Queensland Music Awards (previously known as Q Song Awards) are annual awards celebrating Queensland, Australia's brightest emerging artists and established legends. They commenced in 2006.

Year	Nominee / work	Award	Result (wins only)	Ref.
2026	Odd Mob	Breakthrough Artist	Won	
