= This Feeling (IYES and Ryan Riback song) =

Single by IYES and Ryan Riback
- Released: 9 December 2018
- Recorded: 2018
- Length: 3:18
- Label: Radikal
- Songwriter(s): Josh Christopher; Melis Soyaslanová; Ryan Riback
- Producer(s): Josh Christopher; Ryan Riback

Music video
- "This Feeling" on YouTube

"This Feeling" is a song by the German-based IYES and South African-born Australian dance remixer/producer Ryan Riback. Originally intended to be solely an IYES only single, Riback liked the track and collaborated on a newly re-recorded version of the song.

The track became the first number-one single for both artists in the United States on Billboard's Dance Club Songs chart, reaching the summit in its 9 March 2019 issue.

== Track listing ==
=== Original ===
Digital download

1. "This Feeling" – 3:18
2. "This Feeling" (Extended Mix) – 4:15

=== Remixes (Part 1) ===
Digital download

1. "This Feeling" (Teo Mandrelli Remix)
2. "This Feeling" (Jared Martson Remix Radio Edit)
3. "This Feeling" (MC4D Remix)
4. "This Feeling" (PANNY Remix)
5. "This Feeling" (Jared Martson Remix)
6. "This Feeling" (MC4D Remix Extended)

=== Remixes (Part 2) ===
Digital download

1. "This Feeling" (StoneBridge & Damien Hall Epic Mix)
2. "This Feeling" (StoneBridge & Damien Hall Epic Extended Mix)
3. "This Feeling" (StoneBridge & Damien Hall Epic Extended Mix Instrumental)

== Charts ==
=== Weekly charts ===
Chart (2018–19)	Peak position
US Dance Club Songs (Billboard)	1

=== Year-end charts ===
Chart (2019)	Position
US Dance Club Songs (Billboard)	34

== See also ==
- List of Billboard number-one dance songs of 2019
