= Bravebird =

Studio album by Amel Larrieux
- Released: January 20, 2004
- Recorded: 2003
- Genres: R&B; soul; neo soul; folk
- Label: Blisslife
- Producers: Amel Larrieux, Laru Larrieux, Threadhead, Basho Ink

Amel Larrieux chronology
Infinite Possibilities (2000)	Bravebird (2004)	Morning (2006)

Singles from Bravebird
- 1. "For Real" Released: November 25, 2003; 2. "We Can Be New" Released: 2004

Professional ratings
Review scores
Source	Rating
Allmusic	4/5 stars
Entertainment Weekly	B−
Blender	4/5 stars
Rolling Stone	3.5/5 stars
Stylus Magazine	C+

Bravebird is the second studio album by American R&B-soul singer-songwriter Amel Larrieux, released in the United States on January 20, 2004, by her independent label Blisslife Records. The album features the single "For Real", which reached number forty-five on Billboard's Hot R&B/Hip-Hop Songs chart, becoming Larrieux's second highest-charting solo single on the chart after 1999's "Get Up".

== Album information ==
On the significance of the album title and song "Bravebird", Larrieux told Barnes & Noble:

"I read a story in a magazine [about a survivor of female genital mutilation] and wrote about it. I guess it was a gift to her to extol her bravery. [The album title] became appropriate also because true supporters of my music found ways to hear the song before it got on the album. It had been floating around to DJs two years ago. And I do shows and perform the song, so everybody knew it. So I started referring to [my fans] as brave birds when I write messages to them on my web site." It is likely she was referring to Waris Dirie who is the author of Desert Flower.

== Track listing ==
All songs written by Amel Larrieux and Laru Larrieux.

1. "For Real" – 3:46
2. "Bravebird" – 4:48
3. "Dear to Me" – 4:12
4. "All I Got" – 3:50
5. "Beyond" – 3:05
6. "We Can Be New" – 4:57
7. "Giving Something Up" – 3:42
8. "Your Eyes" – 3:30
9. "Congo" – 4:40
10. "Sacred" – 3:43
11. "Say You Want It All" – 4:04
12. "All I Got2" – 2:48

=== Japanese edition ===
1. "For Real" – 3:46
2. "Bravebird" – 4:48
3. "Dear to Me" – 4:12
4. "All I Got" – 3:50
5. "Beyond" – 3:05
6. "We Can Be New" – 4:57
7. "Giving Something Up" – 3:42
8. "Your Eyes" – 3:30
9. "Congo" – 4:40
10. "Sacred" – 3:43
11. "All I Got2" – 2:48
12. "Just Once" - 3:42
13. "Say You Want It All" – 4:04

== Personnel ==
=== Musicians ===
- Amel Larrieux – vocals

=== Production ===
- Amel Larrieux – producer, art direction
- Laru Larrieux – producer, engineer, art direction, mixing
- Kwame "Young MIchael K Success" Harris – engineer, mixing
- Eric "Ebo" Butler – engineer, mixing
- Basho Ink – producer
- Herb Powers – mastering
- Andy Schlesinger – engineer, mixing
- Threadhead – producer

== Charts ==
Chart (2004)	Peak position
U.S. Billboard 200	166
U.S. Billboard Top R&B/Hip-Hop Albums	28
U.S. Billboard Top Independent Albums	5

== Release history ==
Country	Date	Label
United States	January 20, 2004	Blisslife
Canada	January 20, 2004	Blisslife
Japan	January 21, 2004	Eclectika
United Kingdom	January 26, 2004	Blisslife
Australia	January 27, 2004	Blisslife
Germany	October 19, 2004	Blisslife
