= Keep Tryin' (Groove Theory song) =

Single by Groove Theory

from the album Groove Theory
- Released: January 23, 1996
- Genre: R&B
- Length: 4:20
- Label: Epic
- Songwriters: Amel Larrieux, Guesly Larrieux & Bryce Wilson
- Producer: Bryce Wilson

Groove Theory singles chronology
| "Tell Me" (1995) | "Keep Tryin'" (1996) | "Baby Luv" (1996) |

"Keep Tryin'" is a song by American R&B group Groove Theory, recorded for their debut album, Groove Theory (1995). The song was released in January 1996 by Epic Records as the album's second single. It peaked at numbers 41 and 64 on the US Cash Box Top 100 and Billboard Hot 100 charts.

== Track listings ==
12", Vinyl

1. "Keep Tryin'" (Radio Edit) - 3:57
2. "Keep Tryin'" (Instrumental) - 4:17
3. "Keep Tryin'" (LP Version) - 4:20
4. "Keep Tryin'" (Acapella) - 3:57

12", Vinyl

1. "Keep Tryin'" (Hip Hop Mix w/ Rap) - 4:25
2. "Keep Tryin'" (Go-Go Mix) - 4:21
3. "Keep Tryin'" (Hip Hop Mix w/o Rap) - 4:25
4. "Keep Tryin'" (The Dream Sequence) - 4:35
5. "Keep Tryin'" (The Dream Sequence Instrumental) - 4:03
6. "Keep Tryin'" (The Wet Mix) - 7:00

== Personnel ==
Information taken from Discogs.

- bass – Eric "EBO" Butler
- engineering – Angela Piva
- executive production – Jimmy Henchmen, Amel Larrieux, Bryce Wilson
- keyboards – Bryce Wilson
- mastering – Chris Gehringer
- production – Bryce Wilson
- vocals (background) – Amel Larrieux

== Charts ==
| Chart (1996) | Peak position |
|---|---|
| US Billboard Hot 100 | 64 |
| US Hot Dance Music/Maxi-Singles Sales (Billboard) | 36 |
| US Hot R&B/Hip-Hop Singles & Tracks (Billboard) | 24 |
| US Rhythmic Top 40 (Billboard) | 29 |
| US Cash Box Top 100 | 41 |
