= The One (Shinichi Osawa album) =

Studio album by Shinichi Osawa
- Released: 3 September 2007
- Length: 71:14
- Label: Rhythm Zone (JP); Dim Mak Records (US)
- Producer: Shinichi Osawa

Shinichi Osawa chronology
Next Wave (2003)	The One (2007)	SO2 (2010)

Professional ratings
Review scores
Source	Rating
Allmusic	link

The One is an album by Japanese musician, DJ, record producer and composer Shinichi Osawa, and the first studio album released under his real name. The album is a major departure for Osawa; mainly electro house and breakbeat roots, and focusing more on the experimental variants of house (electro, fidget, among others) as well as electronic rock. Many tracks make use of regular instrumentation; usually guitars, bass and drums, but extending to koto in the final track.

It features collaborations with Au Revoir Simone, Princess Superstar, Ania Chorabik, Nelson, Freeform Five and others.

== Track listing ==
1. "Star Guitar" (The Chemical Brothers cover) – 5:55
2. "Detonator" – 4:58
3. "Electro411" – 5:21
4. "Our Song" – 5:25
5. "Dreamhunt" – 4:55
6. "Push" – 3:55
7. "Rendezvous" – 5:15
8. "The Patch" – 2:13
9. "Last Days" – 6:11
10. "State of Permission" – 5:08
11. "Foals" – 4:37
12. "The Golden" – 5:38
13. "Maximum Joy" – 6:24
14. "Ami Nu Ku Tuu (The One Version)" – 5:19
