= Groove Theory (album) =

Studio album by Groove Theory
- Released: October 24, 1995
- Recorded: 1994–1995
- Genre: R&B; neo soul; hip-hop soul
- Length: 59:14
- Label: Epic
- Producer: Bryce Wilson

Singles from Groove Theory
- 1. "Tell Me" Released: September 5, 1995; 2. "Keep Tryin'" Released: January 23, 1996; 3. "Baby Luv" Released: July 16, 1996

Groove Theory is the only studio album by the American R&B duo Groove Theory, released on October 24, 1995, by Epic Records. The album peaked at number sixty-nine on the US Billboard 200 chart. In October 1996, it was certified gold by the Recording Industry Association of America (RIAA) for surpassing 500,000 copies in the United States.

== Background ==
"Well, I mean, inspiration was being young and green and having years and years of songs written before then, and never being in the studio before. It's a live combination of inexperience, excitement, innocence, and a lot to say, you know being years and years of writing stuff, and watching things, and I grew up at the time that the Native Tongues was really popular, that really influenced me. I think I grew up in the heyday of hip-hop, the best hip-hop, the late 1980s, early 1990s, so I had a lot of stuff to inspire musically that was going on. And it was inspirational for me as a songwriter to be able to have all my own material that I was writing, as opposed to being in a group where some things are written for you."

— Amel Larrieux, 2009 interview with Nu-Soul Magazine

== Reception ==
Professional ratings
Review scores
Source	Rating
AllMusic	4/5 stars
Pitchfork	7.7/10

Stanton Swihart of AllMusic considered the effort "an exquisite, even innovative album. Not only did it (in retrospect) help to herald the progressive neo-soul movement, but its melding of decidedly hip-hop production techniques... with the emotional impulses and themes of soul was still a novel approach to making R&B at the time."

In a retrospective review, Stephen Kearse of Pitchfork declared the record "a cool and atmospheric bomb thrown into the waters of ’90s R&B… Although Groove Theory’s fusions never feel as audacious as the worldbuilding taking place on other syncretic mid-’90s R&B albums like Meshell Ndegeocello’s Plantation Lullabies, Sade’s Love Deluxe, D’Angelo’s Brown Sugar, and Janet Jackson’s janet., there's no friction from all the blending. Groove Theory imagined R&B as a tentpole genre that could house jazz scats, funk grooves, and rap edge without conflict. It's no accident that the terms most often used to describe the group are "cool" and "smooth."

== Track listing ==
All music by B. Wilson, A. Larrieux, and D. Brown except where noted.

No.	Title	Music	Length
1.	"10 Minute High"	B. Wilson, A. Larrieux, K. Deane	4:06
2.	"Time Flies"	B. Wilson, A. Larrieux, L. Larrieux, I. Lee	4:15
3.	"Ride"	B. Wilson, A. Larrieux, D. Brown, S. Jasper, I. Lee	5:08
4.	"Come Home"		4:40
5.	"Baby Luv"		4:48
6.	"Tell Me"		3:56
7.	"Hey U"		6:34
8.	"Hello It's Me"	T. Rundgren	5:03
9.	"Good 2 Me"	B. Wilson, A. Larrieux, D. Brown, L. Larrieux	4:12
10.	"Angel"		3:56
11.	"Keep Tryin' "	B. Wilson, A. Larrieux, L. Larrieux	4:20
12.	"You're Not the 1"		4:25
13.	"Didja Know"	B. Wilson, A. Larrieux, L. Larrieux	3:55
14.	"Boy at the Window"		5:13

== Personnel ==
- Art direction – Carol Chen
- Bass – Darryl Brown, Eric "Ibo" Butler, Kirk Lyons
- Design – Sean Evans
- Drums – Ralph Rolle
- Engineering – Russell Elevado, Joe Hornof
- Executive production – Jimmy Henchman, Amel Larrieux
- Guitar – Darryl Brown, Mike "Dino" Campbell
- Keyboard arrangements – Bryce Wilson
- Keyboards – Darryl Brown, Kevin Deane, Gary Montoute, Bryce Wilson
- Mastering – Chris Gehringer
- Mixing – Ron Banks, Russell Elevado, Dave Kennedy, Angela Piva
- Percussion – Jeff Haynes
- Production – Lamont Boles, Amel Larrieux, Bryce Wilson
- Production coordination – Donald Wood, Kim Lumpkin
- Programming – Isiah Lee
- Saxophone – Mike Phillips
- Stylist – Jamie Kimmelman
- Vocal arrangement – Amel Larrieux, Laru Larrieux, Trey Lorenz
- Vocals – Amel Larrieux, Laru Larrieux
- Vocals (background) – Sean Jasper, Jean, Amel Larrieux, Laru Larrieux, Trey Lorenz, Troy Montgomery

== Charts ==
=== Album ===
Chart performance for Groove Theory
Chart (1995)	Peak position
Australian Albums (ARIA)	29
US Billboard 200	69
US R&B Albums	14

=== Singles ===
Title	Year	Peak chart positions				
Title	Year	US Billboard Hot 100	US Hot Dance Music/Maxi-Singles Sales	US Hot R&B/Hip-Hop Singles & Tracks	US Rhythmic Top 40	US Top 40 Mainstream
"Tell Me"	1995	5	2	3	2	21
"Keep Tryin'"	1996	64	36	24	29	—
"Baby Luv"	1996	65	18	23	14	—

"—" denotes releases that did not chart.

== Certifications ==
Region	Certification	Certified units/sales
United States (RIAA)	Gold	500,000^{^}
^{^} Shipments figures based on certification alone.
