= Starley (singer) =

Australian singer and songwriter (born 1987)

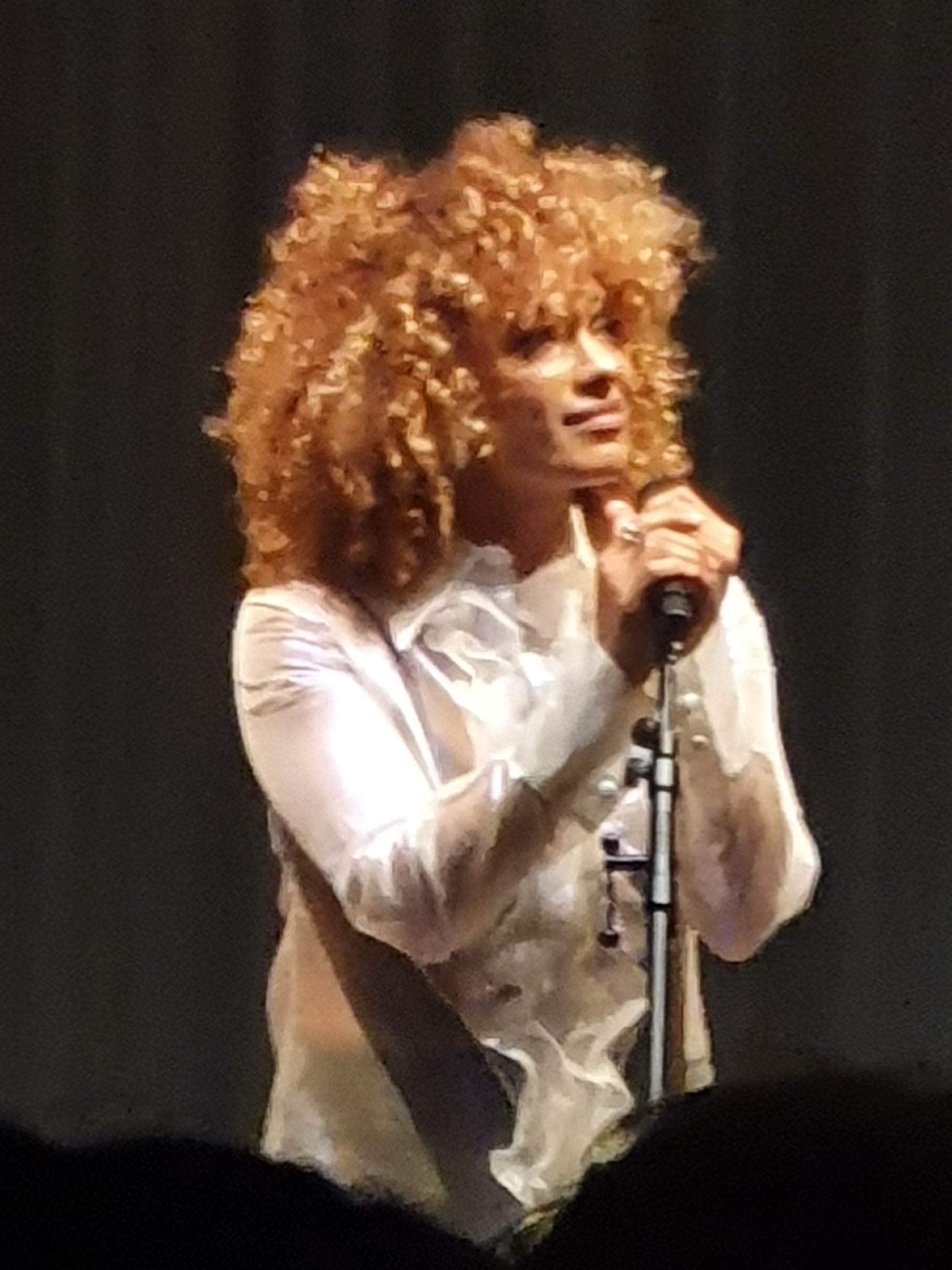
- Starley performing at the Auckland Town Hall, 2019

Background information
- Born: Starley Hope; 3 October 1987 (age 39); Sydney, New South Wales, Australia
- Genre: Electropop
- Occupations: Singer; songwriter
- Instrument: Vocals
- Years active: 2016–present
- Label: Tinted

Starley Hope (born 3 October 1987), known mononymously as Starley, is an Australian singer and songwriter. She is best known for her debut single "Call on Me", released in 2016, which was remixed into a club song by Ryan Riback the following year.

== Biography ==
=== Early life ===
Starley Hope was born and raised in Sydney, New South Wales, to a Mauritian father and an Australian mother of Filipino and Japanese descent. Her mother was a lounge singer and her father owned a blinds company. Her mother named her Starley, expecting her to be a star. She grew up in a religious family and sung in church as a child and initially wanted to be a drummer. As a child, she listened to Mariah Carey, Destiny's Child, and Phil Collins. When she was 14, she recorded a three-song demo. She received classical vocal training beginning at age 15.

=== Career ===
Starley moved to London to pursue a career in music. While she did get a publishing contract, she was generally unsuccessful and, after 5 years, she moved back to Australia to live with her parents after depleting all her funds.

Starley was featured on Odd Mob's single "So Into You", which was released on 8 April 2016.

Using her parents' piano in her bedroom, she wrote the song "Call on Me". She sent the song to several producers, including P-Money, who developed it into the final version. The song led to her getting a recording contract with Tinted Records, which released the song in July 2016. It was remixed into a club song by Ryan Riback the following year and reached the top 10 in the UK and in Australia. In the U.S., it peaked at number 65 on the Billboard Hot 100 and number 9 on the Dance/Electronic Songs record chart.

In 2018, Starley performed at the Sydney Mardi Gras for the first time and was the co-headline act at the official party.

In June 2018, Starley released "Love Is Love", a track to promote queer acceptance, released six months after the Australian Marriage Law Postal Survey.

In July and August 2018, Starley supported Katy Perry on the Australian dates of Witness: The Tour.

In November 2018, she appeared in the music video for "Baby" by Clean Bandit.

Starley released her debut album, One of One, on 25 September 2020.

On 15 October 2020, Starley appeared on episode four of the sixth season of The Bachelorette Australia. She performed atop the Sydney Harbour Bridge for Bachelorette Becky and Pete during their date.

In September 2022, Starley collaborated with music producer Jolyon Petch for their original single "I Just Want Your Touch", released on Central Station Records. The song topped the number-one spot on the ARIA Club Chart for five consecutive weeks.

== Personal life ==
Starley told her family she was bisexual in 2017. She had previously dated men and told Star Observer that her highly religious family were "surprised" and her announcement was a "big deal for them". She has suffered from depression, which she treated by exercising as much as three hours per day and at one time was interested in being a personal trainer.

== Discography ==
=== Albums ===
List of albums, with selected details
Title	Details
One of One	Released: 25 September 2020; Label: Central Station; Formats: CD, digital download, streaming

=== Singles ===
==== As lead artist ====
List of singles as lead artist, with selected peak chart positions and certifications
Title	Year	Peak chart positions											Certifications	Album
Title	Year	AUS	BEL (FL)	CAN	DEN	GER	FRA	IRE	NZ	SWE	UK	US	Certifications	Album
"Call on Me" (solo or Ryan Riback Remix)	2016	8	10	38	4	7	12	4	8	1	6	65	ARIA: 3× Platinum; BEA: Gold; BPI: 2× Platinum; BVMI: 3× Gold; GLF: 5× Platinum; IFPI DEN: Platinum; MC: 3× Platinum; RIAA: Platinum; RMNZ: Platinum; SNEP: Diamond	One of One
"Touch Me"	2017	65	—	—	—	—	—	—	— (Note: "Touch Me" did not enter the NZ Top 40 Singles Chart, but peaked at number three on the NZ Heatseeker Singles Chart.)	—	—	—		Non-album singles
"Been Meaning to Tell You"	2017	—	—	—	—	—	—	—	—	—	—	—		Non-album singles
"Love Is Love"	2018	—	—	—	—	—	—	—	—	—	—	—		One of One
"Signs"	2018	—	—	—	—	—	—	—	—	—	—	—		One of One
"Lovers + Strangers"	2019	—	—	—	—	—	—	—	—	—	—	—		One of One
"Arms Around Me"	2020	—	—	—	—	—	—	—	—	—	—	—		One of One
"Let Me In"	2020	—	—	—	—	—	—	—	—	—	—	—		One of One
"Better with U"	2020	—	—	—	—	—	—	—	—	—	—	—		One of One
"I Just Want Your Touch" (with Jolyon Petch)	2022	—	—	—	—	—	—	—	—	—	—	—		Non-album single
"Peace"	2026	—	—	—	—	—	—	—	—	—	—	—		

==== As featured artist ====
List of singles as featured artist, with year released and selected chart positions shown
Title	Year	Peak chart positions	Album
Title	Year	AUS Club	Album
"So Into You" (Odd Mob featuring Starley)	2016	1	Non-album singles
"Down Easy" (Showtek and MOTi featuring Starley and Wyclef Jean)	2018	—	Non-album singles
"I Just Want Your Touch" (Jolyon Petch featuring Starley)	2022	1	Non-album singles

== Awards ==
=== AIR Awards ===
The Australian Independent Record Awards (commonly known informally as AIR Awards) is an annual awards night to recognise, promote and celebrate the success of Australia's Independent Music sector.

Year	Nominee / work	Award	Result
2017	"Call on Me"	Best Independent Dance/Electronic Club Song or EP	Nominated

=== ARIA Music Awards ===
The ARIA Music Awards is an annual awards ceremony that recognises excellence, innovation, and achievement across all genres of Australian music.

Year	Nominee / work	Award	Result	Lost to
2017	"Call on Me"	Song of the Year	Nominated	Peking Duk - "Stranger (with Elliphant)"
