= Next Wave (album) =

Studio album by Mondo Grosso
- Released: June 25, 2003
- Length: 70:35
- Label: SMEJ
- Producer: Shinichi Osawa

Mondo Grosso chronology
MG4 (2000)	Next Wave (2003)	The One (2007)

Next Wave is an album by Japanese musician, DJ, record producer and composer Mondo Grosso. It contains collaborations with Kelis, Armand Van Helden, BoA, UA, Harry Romero and others. The track "Blaze it Up" appeared as "BLZ" on the soundtrack to the 2002 FIFA World Cup, Fever Pitch. The track "Shinin’" has appeared in the Lumines puzzle video game series.

== Track listing ==
1. "Blaze it Up" (feat. Blu) - 6:17
2. "Motormouth" (feat. Lori Fine) - 6:25
3. "Waitin' For T" (feat. Saigenji) - 5:07
4. "Intermezzo Cosmo" - 1:01
5. "Everything Needs Love" (feat. BoA) - 5:58
6. "Intermezzo Earth" - 1:07
7. "Fight for Your Right" (feat. Kelis) - 4:55
8. "Dancefloor Combat" (feat. Armand Van Helden) - 6:40
9. "Graceful Ways" (feat. Anis) - 6:33
10. "Next Wave" (w/ Towa Tei) - 5:33
11. "Tornado" (w/ Harry Romero) - 6:03
12. "Intermezzo Sun" - 1:14
13. "Shinin'" (feat. KJ) - 6:36
14. "光" (feat. UA) - 7:13
