= Groove Theory =

American music group

- Origin: New York City, New York, United States
- Genres: R&B, neo soul, hip-hop soul
- Years active: 1993–2001
- Labels: Epic, Columbia
- Past members: Bryce Wilson (1993–2001); Amel Larrieux (1993–1999); Makeda Davis (2000–2001)

Groove Theory was an American R&B duo, with former member, singer-songwriter Amel Larrieux and songwriter/producer/actor, Bryce Wilson. The group is best known for their 1995 hit "Tell Me", which reached the top five of Billboard's Hot 100 and the US Billboard R&B chart.

== Early years ==
The group formed in New York City in 1993, when Amel Larrieux met Bryce Wilson while she was working at Rondor Music as a receptionist. Larrieux had been working at the music publishing company since the age of 18. A publisher at the company had signed Wilson as a producer, and knew he was interested in forming a group. He approached Larrieux, who he knew was a singer-songwriter, with one of Wilson's production tracks, saying "look, you wanna try writing a song? You know I can give you one of the tracks, and you can do it, and if you don't mind, you can demo it." Wilson hoped to use the group as a chance to utilize his production talents, while Larrieux wanted a chance to shine in R&B. Wilson also found it useful for Larrieux to both write, sing, and arrange each song instead of shopping around for different singers and songwriters.

== Career ==
=== Commercial success ===
The group signed a recording contract with Epic Records, and in 1995, they released their self-titled debut album Groove Theory. The album featured the gold-selling hit single, "Tell Me", which reached number five on the Billboard Hot 100 and number three on the Hot R&B/Hip-Hop Songs chart. "Tell Me" also peaked at No. 31 on the UK Singles Chart in November 1995. Other charted singles included "Baby Luv" and "Keep Trying", which reached numbers 18 and 36 on the R&B chart, respectively. The album also went on to be certified gold.

=== Break up ===
Larrieux left Groove Theory in 1999 to pursue a solo career, and was replaced by Makeda Davis, a songwriter and session singer/background vocalist who appeared on 1997 K-Ci & JoJo album Love Always and co-wrote rapper Amil's "I Got That". The group signed with Columbia Records and recorded a new album, The Answer, which was expected for release in 2000. Displeased with Columbia's track record at the time with urban projects, Wilson asked for a release from the label, causing the album to remain unreleased. A single entitled "4 Shure" was released from the album to minor chart performance.

Larrieux began her solo career in her absence from the group, forming her own independent record label, Blisslife, to distribute her music. Wilson appeared in the films Beauty Shop, Trois and Hair Show, and produced music for Beyoncé, Amerie and Mary J. Blige. In a 2016 interview with music publication the Fader, Wilson revealed that the entire shelved album The Answer was heard and praised by rapper Jay-Z and Beyoncé at an impromptu studio listening session with Lupe Fiasco manager Chill Patterson, Wilson, and a few other people, after which Jay-Z began shopping songs from the shelved project to Beyoncé, Janet Jackson, and other artists/labels. As a result, Wilson and Davis appear as co-writers on several songs for other artists: "Hip-Hop Star" and unreleased songs "Settle 4 U" and "Scent of You" from Beyoncé's debut album Dangerously In Love (2003), "Not The Only One" from Amerie's sophomore album Touch (2005), and "It's OK" from Mashonda's debut album January Joy (2005).

== Discography ==
=== Albums ===
| Title | Album details | Peak chart positions | | | Certifications |
| Title | Album details | US | US R&B | AUS | Certifications |
|---|---|---|---|---|---|
| Groove Theory | Released: October 24, 1995; Label: Epic; Formats: CD, LP, cassette, digital download | 69 | 14 | 29 | RIAA: Gold |

=== Singles ===
| Title | Year | Peak chart positions | | | | | Certifications | Album |
| Title | Year | US | US R&B | AUS | NZ | UK | Certifications | Album |
|---|---|---|---|---|---|---|---|---|
| "Tell Me" | 1995 | 5 | 3 | 6 | 14 | 31 | RIAA: Gold; ARIA: Gold; BPI: Silver | Groove Theory |
| "Keep Tryin'" | 1996 | 64 | 24 | — | — | — | | Groove Theory |
| "Baby Luv" | 1996 | 65 | 23 | — | — | — | | Groove Theory |
| "4 Shure" | 2000 | — | 97 | — | — | — | | The Answer |
