= SO2 (album) =

Studio album by Shinichi Osawa
- Released: June 30, 2010
- Length: 64:27
- Label: AVEX TRAX (JP); Southern Fried Records (EUR/US)
- Producer: Shinichi Osawa

Shinichi Osawa chronology
The One (2007)	SO2 (2010)

SO2 is an album released by the Japanese musician, DJ, record producer and composer Shinichi Osawa on June 30, 2010 and is the second studio album under his real name.

== Track listing ==
1. "Love Will Guide You" - 5:39 (feat. Tommie Sunshine)
2. "Sylkill" - 3:35
3. "Zingaro" - 5:49
4. "Heart Goes Boom" - 3:49 (feat. The Black Ghosts)
5. "Pianoctro" - 4:38
6. "Technodluv" - 5:27
7. "BUTTON!!" - 3:37
8. "Singapore Swing" - 4:46 (feat. Paul Chambers)
9. "BBG BBB" - 5:38
10. "Morphy" - 5:23
11. "Paris" - 4:46
12. "London (Homes Not Where You Lay Your Head)" - 5:37
13. "Thank You For Your Love" - 5:51
