= Shinichi Osawa =

Musical artist (born 1967)

- Born: February 7, 1967 (age 59)
- Origin: Tokyo, Japan
- Genres: Electronic; electro house; big beat
- Occupations: Musician; DJ; record producer; composer
- Years active: 1989–present
- Labels: For Life; Avex Trax; Rhythm Zone; Sony Music Japan; Southern Fried; Data; Dim Mak
- Website: www.shinichi-osawa.com

Shinichi Osawa (Japanese: 大沢 伸一, Hepburn: Ōsawa Shin'ichi; born 7 February 1967), also known by his stage name Mondo Grosso, is a Japanese musician, DJ, record producer and composer. Over the course of his career, he has worked in genres ranging from acid jazz to house, with strong influences of underground club music, though his recent work has been in the genre of electro house. HMV Japan rated Mondo Grosso at number 95 on their "Top 100 Japanese Pop Artists," and Shinichi Osawa was ranked as Japan's number 3 overall DJ by TopDeejays.com as of 2016.

== Background ==
Shinichi Osawa was originally the producer and bassist for the popular Japanese musical group Mondo Grosso, which formed in Kyoto in 1991 on the For Life Records label. However, in 1995, after the group disbanded, Osawa concentrated more on his own material, collaborating with many artists such as Monday Michiru, Amel Larrieux, UA, Chara, Dragon Ash and even Ayumi Hamasaki. During his collaborative work in 1997, he became a solo producer, releasing the R&B-infused acid jazz and house album Closer.

He made a move from For Life Records to Sony Music Associated Records in 1999, where he began his own label. Throughout the years, Osawa acted as a producer for artists such as Bird and Eri Nobuchika. His 2000 album MG4 displayed the diversity of his production, fusing jazz and house. It featured the hit song 'Life,' featuring Bird. In 2003 he released Next Wave, a more traditional house album.

Osawa provided the hypnotic array of techno music on the popular PlayStation Portable game Lumines in 2004. He did not reappear as a composer for its sequel.

In 2007, Osawa signed to record label Avex Trax. Feeling that, in comparison to his previous albums, the sound reflected more closely his DJ sets and performances (performed under his real name), Osawa released his electro house album The One under the moniker of 'Shinichi Osawa' rather than 'Mondo Grosso.' "Our Song" was the initial single released in Japan, followed by the Chemical Brothers cover Star Guitar. Under his real name, Osawa has received more international attention, creating acclaimed remixes of Felix da Housecat's "Radio" and Digitalism's "Pogo." He also performed at Electric Daisy Carnival, which was his first performance in America. He is also featured in Clazziquai's Robotica album in a remix for Prayers by Christina Chu.

In 2008, he remixed #1-hit song Startin' by Japanese pop sensation Ayumi Hamasaki. The mix appeared on the album Ayu-mi-x 6 -GOLD-.

In October 2008, following a release of "Star Guitar" as a single by Data Records, Southern Fried Records made a digital release of "The One" in the UK. A physical release is scheduled for January 2009.

In November 2008, "Our Song" appeared on the 16th version of Konami's DJ simulation series Beatmania IIDX, alongside several other songs by Avex's House Nation group.

Osawa is currently involved in Ravex, a collaboration with fellow Avex DJs Tomoyuki Tanaka and Taku Takahashi established to mark 20 years of Avex. Their debut album Trax was released on April 8, 2009, and follows the release of the singles "I Rave U" and "Believe in LOVE" featuring BoA.

Osawa released SO2, the second album under his given name, on June 16, 2010 digitally and June 30 on CD/DVD.

In 2009, Osawa collaborated with Takeshi Kobayashi to form the duo Bradberry Orchestra. With the lead single "LOVE CHECK," Bradberry Orchestra released their first album "Vol.0" on March 16, 2011 in Japan through Avex. Songs from the album have been used to promote Sony's Xperia phone as well as SEGA's Yakuza Of the End.

Currently, Osawa hosts a bi-monthly online radio show called Date Line with fellow DJ Masatoshi Uemura on block.fm.

In 2017, he released the Mondo Grosso song "Labyrinth". The music video, starring actress Hikari Mitsushima, has over 37 million views on YouTube as of January 2024.

Along with Australian artist RHYME, Osawa is half of the duo RHYME SO. They released their single "Fashion Blogger" in March 2020. In 2021, Osawa and RHYME opened The Nuts Exchange, a vegan cafe in Shibuya that serves Australian-Japanese fusion food.

== Representation ==
Currently, Osawa is signed onto Avex Trax's Rhythm Zone label. Previously he was signed to Sony Music Japan's FEARLESS RECORDS division and released albums under the title of Mondo Grosso (Italian for "big world"), showing influences of Brazilian music and language in songs such as "Maigo no Astronauta" or "Carnival of Colors."

== Discography ==
- The One (2007)
- SO2 (2010)
