= MG4 (album) =

Studio album by Mondo Grosso
- Released: November 27, 2000
- Length: 72:21
- Label: Epic
- Producer: Shinichi Osawa

Mondo Grosso chronology
Closer (1998)	MG4 (2000)	Next Wave (2003)

MG4 is an album by the Japanese musician, DJ, record producer and composer Mondo Grosso.

== Track listing ==
1. "MG2SS" - 7:45
2. "Into the Wind" - 0:42
3. "Butterfly" - 6:03
4. "Show Me Your Love - 5:33
5. "Into the sound" - 0:23
6. "Life" - 7:08
7. "MG4BB" - 5:37
8. "SCENARIO" - 6:08
9. "Into the Seawind" - 1:06
10. "Samba Do Gato" - 7:37
11. "Now You Know Better " - 5:32
12. "STAR SUITE I: New Star" - 3:17
13. "STAR SUITE II: Fading Star" - 4:10
14. "STAR SUITE III: North Star" - 7:19
15. "1974 - Way Home-" - 4:37
