= Hitomi Takahashi discography =

This article contains the discography of Japanese punk/rock singer Hitomi Takahashi.

== Discography ==
=== Albums ===
#	Information	Sales
1	Sympathy: Format: CD, CD+DVD; Released: March 1, 2006; Oricon Top 200 weekly peak: #10	39,000
2	Bamboo Collage: Format: CD, CD+DVD; Released: October 24, 2007; Oricon Top 200 weekly peak: #63	5,000
3	Picorinpin: Format: CD; Released: September 28, 2011; Oricon Top 200 weekly peak: Did not chart	1,000

=== Singles ===
#	Information	Sales
1	"Bokutachi no Yukue" 僕たちの行方: Released: April 13, 2005; Format: CD5"; Oricon Top 200 weekly peak: #1	136,000
2	"Evergreen": Released: August 10, 2005; Format: CD5"; Oricon Top 200 weekly peak: #22	29,000
3	"Aozora no Namida" 青空のナミダ: Released: November 30, 2005; Format: CD5", CD5"+DVD; Oricon Top 200 weekly peak: #8	83,000
4	"Communication" コミュニケイション: Released: July 12, 2006; Format: CD5"; Oricon Top 200 weekly peak: #60	2,200
5	"Ko·mo·re·bi" コ・モ・レ・ビ: Released: November 1, 2006; Format: CD5"; Oricon Top 200 weekly peak: #50	3,000
6	"Candy Line" キャンディ・ライン: Released: March 7, 2007; Format: CD5"; Oricon Top 200 weekly peak: #14	18,000
7	"Jet Boy Jet Girl": Released: August 1, 2007; Format: CD5", CD5"+DVD; Oricon Top 200 weekly peak: #33	7,000
8	"Tsuyoku Nare" 強くなれ: Released: September 12, 2007; Format: CD5"; Oricon Top 200 weekly peak: #68	2,000
9	"Atashi no Machi, Ashita no Machi" あたしの街、明日の街: Released: June 4, 2008; Format: CD5"; Oricon Top 200 weekly peak: #43	4,100
10	"Wo-Ai-Ni" ウォーアイニー: Released: September 9, 2009; Format: CD5"; Oricon Top 200 weekly peak: #14	10,000
11	"Koisuru Pierotti" 恋するピエロッティ: Released: July 21, 2010; Format: CD5", CD5"+DVD; Oricon Top 200 weekly peak: #128	550
12	"Music": Released: February 23, 2011; Format: CD5", CD5"+DVD; Oricon Top 200 weekly peak: Did not chart	—
13	"Poolside": Released: July 27, 2011; Format: CD5", CD5"+DVD; Oricon Top 200 weekly peak: Did not chart	—

=== Featured/collaborative releases ===
Release	Album	Title
November 2, 2005	Mobile Suit Gundam Seed Destiny Complete Best	"Bokutachi no Yukue"
January 25, 2006	Hit Style	"Bokutachi no Yukue"
January 25, 2006	Matchy Tribute	"Midnight Shuffle"
October 25, 2006	Blood+ Complete Best	"Aozora no Namida"
December 20, 2006	The Songs for Death Note the Movie: The Last Name Tribute	"Drive"
October 3, 2007	Terra e... Original Soundtrack II	"Jet Boy Jet Girl" (Terra e..." Opening Mix)
