= Atashi no Machi, Ashita no Machi =

"Atashi no Machi, Ashita no Machi (あたしの街、明日の街)"

Single by Hitomi Takahashi
- Released: June 4, 2008
- Genre: Punk/Rock
- Length: 12 min 55 s
- Label: gr8! records
- Songwriter: Hitomi Takahashi
- Producer: Satoru Hiraide

Hitomi Takahashi singles chronology
"Tsuyoku Nare" (2007)	"Atashi no Machi, Ashita no Machi (あたしの街、明日の街)" (2008)

"Atashi no Machi, Ashita no Machi (あたしの街、明日の街, My Town, Tomorrow's Town)" is the 9th single released by Japanese punk/rock singer Hitomi Takahashi under the Sony Records (gr8! records) label, and is her first release for 2008 and since her graduation from high school. This single was released over seven months after her album Bamboo Collage, and over eight months after her last single. Tsuyoku Nare

== Overview ==
"Atashi no Machi, Ashita no Machi (あたしの街、明日の街)" is the 9th single release by Japanese punk singer, Hitomi Takahashi, and her first single since 2005's "Aozora no Namida" to not be produced by Takuya. The title song was used as the first opening theme song for the anime Toshokan Sensō, which began airing on April 10. The song is said to be related to Takahashi's recent move from her hometown of Sendai to Tokyo, and the lyrics were written by Takahashi herself. Also, the coupling track for the single, "mother's car", was used as the ending theme song of the NHK TV show "Digital Stadium". In all, the single contained a total of three tracks, and came with a limited edition sticker for first pressings of the CD. This single also marks the first time all the song lyrics on the single were written solely by Takahashi.

== Track listing ==
1. "Atashi no Machi, Ashita no Machi (あたしの街、明日の街)" - 4:49
  Lyrics by Hitomi Takahashi
  Music by Satoru Hiraide
  Arranged by Satoru Hiraide
2. "mother's car" - 4:25
  Lyrics by Hitomi Takahashi
  Music by Satoru Hiraide
  Arranged by Satoru Hiraide
3. "Miss Lady (ミス・レイディ)" - 3:39
  Lyrics by Hitomi Takahashi
  Music by Satoru Hiraide
  Arranged by Satoru Hiraide

== Personnel ==
- Hitomi Takahashi – vocals

== Production ==
- Mixing - Satoru Hiraide
- Guitar & Bass technician - Kazutaka Minemori
- Art Direction & Design - Rie Kategawa
- Photography - Takayuki Abe
- Hair & Make-up - Yohji Fujihara
- Stylist - Mika Nagasawa

== Performances ==
- March 29, 2008 - Sotsu Fess

== Charts ==
Oricon Sales Chart (Japan)

Release	Chart	Peak Position	First Week Sales	Sales Total	Chart Run
4 June 2008	Oricon Daily Singles Chart	#27			
4 June 2008	Oricon Weekly Singles Chart	#43	2,495	4,105	4 weeks

== Oricon Chart Positions ==
Mon	Tue	Wed	Thu	Fri	Sat	Sun	Week Rank	Sales	Total Sales
-	27	32	46	45	40	47	43	2,495	2,495
-	-	-	-	-	-	-	100	792	3,287
-	-	-	-	-	-	-	145	421	3,708
-	-	-	-	-	-	-	198	397	4,105
