= NiNa =

Japanese music group

NiNa (ニナ, Nina) are a Japan-market six-piece group formed in 1999 containing Kate Pierson (of The B-52's), bassist Mick Karn (of Japan), vocalist Yuki Isoya (of Judy and Mary), Takemi Shima and Masahide Sakuma (both of The Plastics), and Steven Wolf, the session drummer. Masahide composed most of the music with input from Pierson and Yuki who also wrote the lyrics. From the 30-second opening track, which starts with ominous techno music and ends with Yuki and Pierson exclaiming "Hello everybody nice to meet you we're NiNa," the band's eponymous and only album is very diverse.

The distinctive album contains a wide variety of music from straightforward ballads to electronica. Credited as a "conceptual and visual agent provocateur," Shima appears to have played a Brian Eno-like role on the recording. The album and two singles which preceded it were all hits in Japan but are mostly unknown in other parts of the world with the exceptions of avid B-52s/Kate Pierson fans.

== Singles ==
- Happy Tomorrow
- Aurora Tour
- Route 246 (NiNa)

== Anime ==
The tracks "Happy Tomorrow" and "Rest in Peace" were used as end-credit songs for the anime television series "Arc the Lad", released in the US by ADV Films despite the fact the former had previously served as the opening-credit song for the J-Drama "Kanojo-tachi no jidai" (1999).

== Albums ==
- NiNa
