= Jet Boy Jet Girl (Hitomi Takahashi song) =

Single by Hitomi Takahashi

from the album Bamboo Collage
- Released: August 1, 2007
- Genre: Punk/J-pop/Rock
- Length: 18 min 01 s
- Label: gr8! records
- Songwriters: Hitomi Takahashi, mavie
- Producer: TAKUYA

Hitomi Takahashi singles chronology
"Candy Line" (2007)	"Jet Boy Jet Girl" (2007)	"Tsuyoku Nare" (2007)

"Jet Boy Jet Girl" is Hitomi Takahashi's 7th single under the Sony Records (gr8! records) label, and was released on August 1, 2007, in two different versions - CD only and CD+DVD.

== Overview ==
"Jet Boy Jet Girl" is the 7th single released by Japanese punk-rock singer Hitomi Takahashi, and her 2nd single to be released in 2007, five months after "Candy Line". The song replaced Uverworld's "endscape" as the opening theme song for the anime Toward the Terra, making "Jet Boy Jet Girl" the second opening theme for the anime. First pressings of the CD+DVD version included an animation video clip of Toward the Terra, along with a sticker and tarot card.

Like her past three singles, "Jet Boy Jet Girl" was produced by Takuya Asanuma of Judy and Mary fame, and the b-side song "Pride" was produced by 175R's shogo.k, who previously produced the song "Drive" for her. The main song "Jet Boy Jet Girl" is described as "featuring a fun sound designed to complement the anime", while "Pride" is described as a "rock tune that's set to get the summer concert bumping". The special DVD movie does not contain a music video as "Aozora no Namida" did, but a series of random, moving clips with "Jet Boy Jet Girl" playing in the background.

Sample of the translated lyrics:

Jet boy, accelerate, don't let go, no matter what
Jet girl, push on, ascend up the air current, and fly high
There's no reasoning behind it, I want to be at your side
With just that, I can be invincible

== Music video ==
Filming for the music video of "Jet Boy Jet Girl" took place on June 23, 2007, in Joso, Ibaraki. Like the music video for "Candy Line", the music video for "Jet Boy Jet Girl" was directed by Jun'ya Masuyama.

== Track listing ==
=== CD Portion ===
1. "Jet Boy Jet Girl" – 4:34
  Lyrics by Hitomi Takahashi & mavie
  Music by Takuya
  Arranged by Takuya
2. "Pride" – 3:35
  Lyrics by shogo.k
  Music by shogo.k
  Arranged by Takuya
3. "Jet Boy Jet Girl -Instrumental-" – 4:31
4. "Pride -Instrumental-" – 3:35
5. "Jet Boy Jet Girl -Terra e... Opening Mix-" – 1:34

=== DVD Portion ===
1. "Jet Boy Jet Girl 'Terra e...' Special Collaboration Animated Music Video"

== Personnel ==
- Hitomi Takahashi – vocals
- TAKUYA - guitars, keyboards, & programming (Tracks #1 & #2)
- Katsuhiko Kurosu - bass (Tracks #1 & #2)
- Kōta Igarashi - drums (Tracks #1 & #2)
- nishi-ken - keyboards & programming (Track #1)

== Charts ==
Oricon Sales Chart (Japan)

Release	Chart	Peak Position	First Week Sales	Sales Total	Chart Run
1 August 2007	Oricon Daily Singles Chart	#22			
1 August 2007	Oricon Weekly Singles Chart	#33	4,300	4,300+	2 weeks
