= Takuya (singer) =

Takuya 浅沼 拓也
- Born: September 9, 1971 (age 54); Kyoto, Japan
- Genres: Rock
- Occupations: Musician, singer, songwriter, record producer
- Instruments: Guitar, vocals
- Years active: 1988–present
- Label: Universal Music Japan
- Website: www.takuya-web.com

Takuya Asanuma (浅沼 拓也, Asanuma Takuya; born 9 September 1971), better known mononymously as Takuya (stylized in all caps as TAKUYA), is a Japanese musician, singer, songwriter and record producer. He was formerly the second guitarist of Judy and Mary. He currently works as a solo artist under the name Takuya and also had a solo project called Robots which was dissolved in 2009. He was previously married to a former geisha from Gion, but they divorced in 2006. His most recent release was a duet with Aya Kamiki titled "W-B-X (W-Boiled Extreme)", the theme for Kamen Rider W.

== Discography ==
=== Singles ===
As Robots

1. "Koibito" (コイビト, Friend; September 1, 1997)
2. "Robot" (October 29, 1997)
3. "Palette" (パレット, Paretto; February 25, 1998)
4. "she-through" (May 13, 1998)
5. "Alchemist" (September 9, 1999)
6. "Irotoridori no Sekai" (イロトリドリ ノ セカイ; September 9, 1999)
7. "Jumping Jack" (November 3, 1999)
8. "Cloud Collector" (January 1, 2000)
- Digital singles as Robots
  1. "Greatest delight" (June 18, 2006)
  2. "Kill Me Lil Bee" (キルミーリルビー, Kiru Mī Riru Bī; May 28, 2007)
  3. "Zero" (December 24, 2008)
  4. "Butterfly" (バタフライ, Batafurai; January 28, 2009)

As Takuya

1. "I love you" (September 11, 2002)
2. "Hotaru" (October 23, 2002)
3. "Ai x Go! Yu x Go!" (January 18, 2012)

Collaboration

1. "WBX (W-Boiled Extreme)" (November 11, 2009) (with Aya Kamiki)
2. "Over Again" (February 10, 2021) (with Aya Kamiki)

=== Albums ===
As Robots

1. Guitar de Pop (November 6, 1997)
2. Cloud Collector (November 3, 1999)
3. Dying Music (September 5, 2007)
4. Kogare Sandy mo Sam mo (転がれサンディもサムも, Kogare Sandi mo Samu mo; February 18, 2009)

As Takuya

1. The Wide Wild World (November 27, 2002)
2. 54 it (read as "go for it") (September 1, 2004)

== Music production ==
- Saruganseki's "Hatsukoi" (Lyrics & composition as Takuya, arrangement as Robots)
- Lucifer's "Seitenshi Blue" (Composition), "Silent Melody" (Composition), "Tokyo Illusion" (Composition), "Carnation Crime" (Composition), "Rinne no Hitomi" (Composition), "Tsubasa" (Composition), & "Hyper Sonic Soul" (Composition)
- Juemilia's "Reset" (Lyrics with Yasushi Akimoto & Composition)
- SMAP's "Susume!"
- Hitomi Takahashi's "Komorebi" (Composition & Arrangement), "Candy Line" (Composition & Arrangement), "Jet Boy Jet Girl" (Composition & Arrangement), & "Tsuyoku Nare" (Composition & Arrangement)

== See also ==
- An Music School
