= Mean Machine (band) =

Japanese rock band

- Origin: Japan
- Genres: Rock
- Years active: 2001
- Label: Epic
- Past members: Ayumi Ito, Chara, Chiwaki, Yukari, Yuki
- Website: Official Epic/Sony website (in Japanese)

Mean Machine is an all-girl Japanese rock band. Mean Machine starred in the Tower Records "No Music, No Life" advertising campaign, and debuted in 2001.

== History ==
Mean Machine was founded in 1998 by J-pop vocalist Chara, musician/DJ Chiwaki Mayumi, vocalist Yuki of Judy and Mary, saxophonist Yukarie of The Thrill, and actress Ayumi Ito. The group was conceived as a lighthearted side project, and the band members deliberately chose instruments new to them: Yuki and Chara played drums in the band, Mayumi played guitars, Yukarie played bass, and Ayumi was the vocalist.

In 2001, Mean Machine released the single "Suuhaa," named for a kind of breathing exercise Chara learned when she was pregnant. It reached #18 on the Oricon singles chart. Later that year, their debut album Cream was released. The album reached #7 on the Oricon chart and remained on the charts for five weeks. A second single was released later that year, "Knock on You," reaching #38 on the Oricon chart.

The group was dissolved shortly afterward because of complications with the band members' solo careers.

== Members ==
Name	Role	Profession	Notes
Ayumi 伊藤歩; Romaji: Ayumi Ito	Vocalist, lyricist	Actress	Co-starred with Chara in Shunji Iwai's "Swallowtail Butterfly" as Ageha, winning her the Japanese Academy Award for best new actress and best supporting actress.
CHIWAKI ちわきまゆみ; Romaji: Mayumi Chiwaki	Guitarist, songwriter	Musician, DJ	Debuted with "Good Morning, I Love You" in 1985.
YUKARIE	Bassist, songwriter	Musician	Tenor sax for The Thrill. Debuted with "A MILLION DOLLAR BAND THE THRILL" in 1992.
Yuki (有希) 磯谷有希; Romaji: Yuki Isoya	Drummer, songwriter	Solo artist	Ex-Judy and Mary vocalist, current successful solo artist. Debuted in 1993 with "POWER OF LOVE".
Chara 佐藤美和; Romaji: Miwa Sato	Drummer, songwriter	Solo artist	Immensely popular pop artist. Debuted with "Heaven" 1991.

== Discography ==
=== Albums ===
Year	Album Information	Chart positions
2001	Cream: Released: 14 November 2001; Label: Epic Records (ESCL-2270); Formats: CD, digital download	7

=== Singles ===
Release	Title	Oricon singles charts	CDTV music video charts	Album
2001	Sūhā (スーハー)	18	18	Cream
2001	Knock on You	38	41	Cream
