= Kate Pierson =

American singer, lyricist, multi-instrumentalist (b. 1948)

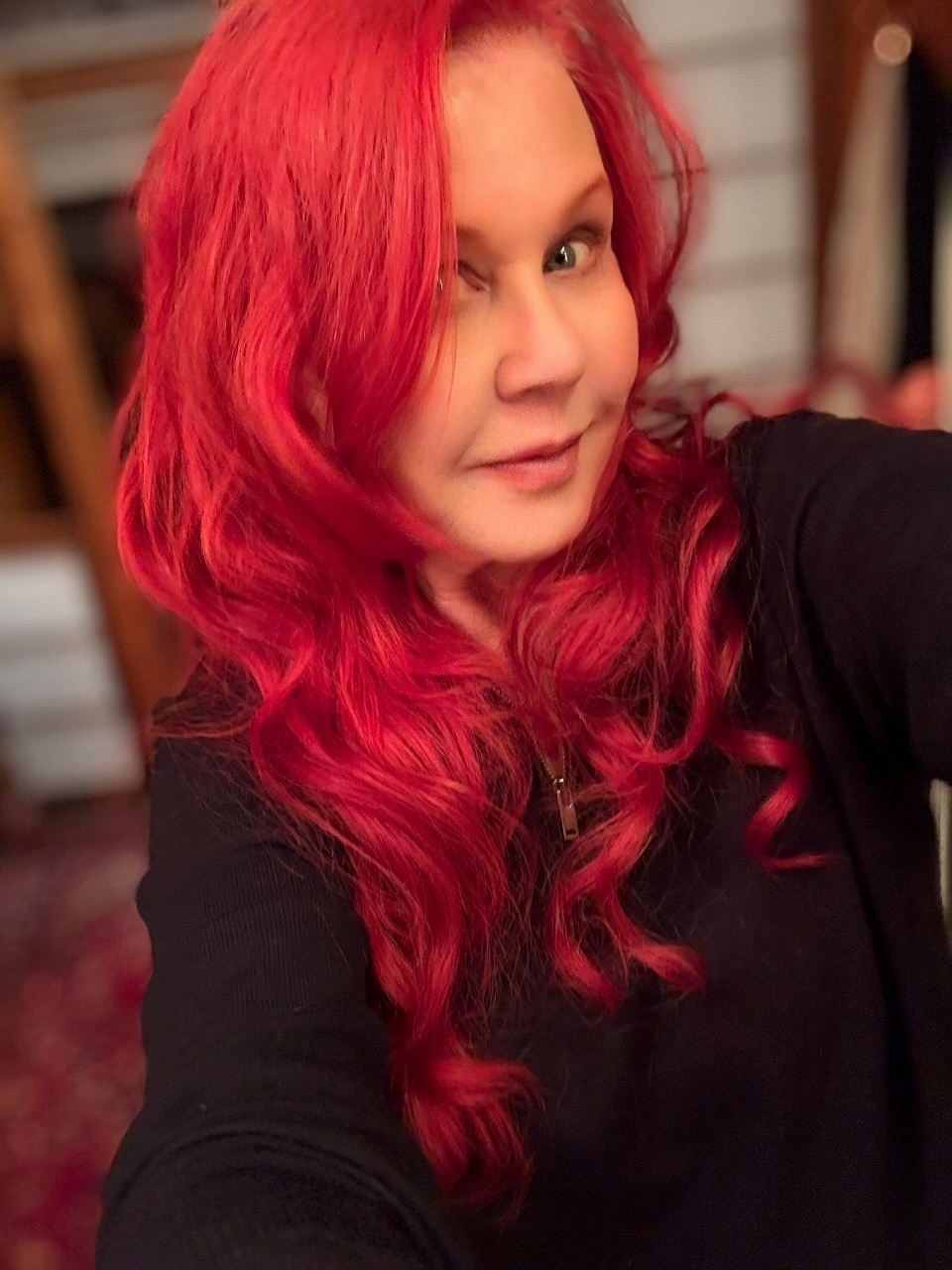
- Pierson in 2024

Background information
- Born: Catherine Elizabeth Pierson; April 27, 1948 (age 78); Weehawken, New Jersey, U.S.
- Genres: Rock; new wave
- Occupations: Musician; singer; songwriter
- Instruments: Vocals; keyboards; guitar; bass; percussion
- Years active: 1976–present
- Labels: Warner Bros.; Reprise; Island; Astralwerks; Lazy Meadow Music
- Member of: The B-52s
- Formerly of: NiNa

Catherine Elizabeth Pierson (born April 27, 1948) is an American singer, lyricist, and founding member of the B-52s. She plays guitar, bass, and various keyboard instruments. In the early years, as well as being a vocalist, Pierson was the main keyboard player and performed on a keyboard bass during live shows and on many of the band's recordings, taking on a role usually filled by a bass guitar player, which differentiated the band from their contemporaries. This, along with Pierson's distinctive, wide-ranging singing voice, remains a trademark of the B-52s' unique sound. Pierson has also collaborated with many other artists, including the Ramones, Iggy Pop, and R.E.M.

In February 2015, Pierson released her first solo album, Guitars and Microphones, featuring material co-written by Sia. She later released the non-album single "Better Not Sting the Bee", and then she released an April 16, 2016 cover of "Venus" as a single. Side B included "Radio In Bed" written by Kate and her wife Monica Coleman. Both tracks were produced by Jack White.

== Early life and education ==
Pierson was born in Weehawken, New Jersey, and raised in Rutherford.

Pierson briefly attended Wheaton College in Wheaton, Illinois before transferring to Boston University, where she earned a journalism degree. She then traveled around Europe for a time in the 1970s, including six months working as a barmaid in The Anson pub in Wallsend, England, before returning to the U.S. and moving to Athens, Georgia, where she lived on a farm and earned a living as a paste-up artist in the type shop of the local newspaper.

== Music career ==
Pierson met up with the other members of what would become the B-52s while living in Athens, Georgia. The band formed in October 1976 and played a few parties before heading to New York to play some shows. Eventually, Pierson and the other band members began commuting between Athens and New York, playing gigs.

== Personal life ==
Pierson was married to Brian Cokayne, a Mancunian, whom she met while living in Europe between 1971 and 1973.

From 1981 to 1996, Pierson was in a relationship with artist Tim Rollins.

In 2003, Pierson began a relationship with artist and designer Monica Coleman. They married on August 3, 2015.

Pierson and Coleman developed Kate's Lazy Meadow motel complex in Mount Tremper, New York in 2003. They have also owned Kate's Lazy Cabin in nearby Lake Hill, New York, both in the Catskill Mountains, Kate's Lazy Desert in Landers, California, and Kate's Lazy Cape located on Cape Cod, Massachusetts. They have operated the businesses together. In 2022, Pierson indicated that the couple had sold Kate's Lazy Meadow, then purchased a vacation home on Cape Cod in Truro, Massachusetts.

In a 2015 interview, Pierson stated that she identifies as bisexual.

== Collaborations ==
- The Ramones, in the early 1980s on the song "Chop Suey", with Cindy Wilson and Debbie Harry; the title is available as a bonus track on the Ramones' re-release CD Pleasant Dreams.
- Pierson, Wilson and Strickland were part of the group Melon, and recorded two songs ("I Will Call You" and "Honeydew") for a Japanese TV show titled Snakeman Show. The soundtrack LP (in 1980) and CD (in 1988) were only released in Japan.
- Fred Schneider, on his Fred Schneider & the Shake Society solo album from 1984, on songs "Monster", "Summer in Hell", "I'm Gonna Haunt You" and "Boonga (The New Jersey Caveman)".
- Iggy Pop, on the 1990 Top-30 song "Candy".
- R.E.M., on the songs "Shiny Happy People" and "Me in Honey" from the 1991 album Out of Time, and "Fretless" from the 1991 soundtrack Until the End of the World.
- Matthew Sweet, on the 1989 album Earth.
- With Cindy Wilson on their cover of the McFadden & Whitehead's song "Ain't No Stoppin' Us Now", recorded for the soundtrack The Associate in 1996.
- The soundtrack for The Rugrats Movie, released in 1998 contains the track "The World Is Something New to Me" and features Pierson, Schneider and Wilson along with other artists.
- "We Are Family", a single released to raise money for the victims of the September 11 attacks, features Pierson and Schneider in the chorus and on the DVD documentation.
- Pierson sang with Jay Ungar and Molly Mason on their 2003 album Relax Your Mind, on the track "Bad Attitude".
- In 2005, #4 of the Esopus magazine came with a free CD that contained the song Bunnies. The track was written and performed by Kate and Pat Irwin.
- Junior Senior, on the song "Take My Time" from the 2005 album Hey Hey My My Yo Yo (with Cindy Wilson).
- Peter Jöback, duet on the song "Sing" from the 2009 album East Side Stories.
- David Byrne and Fatboy Slim, on the song "The Whole Man" from the 2010 album Here Lies Love.
- She was also a member of the Japanese group NiNa with Yuki Isoya and co-wrote and performed a complete album, with the hit singles "Happy Tomorrow" and "Aurora Tour". The album and singles were only released in Japan. Two songs were used as the ending theme song to the anime Arc the Lad.
- She appeared in Blondie's music video for "Mother".
- The soundtrack album Phineas and Ferb: Rockin' and Rollin' released in September 2013 features Pierson singing: "Let's Spend Half A Day".
- One song on Downes Braide Association's 2017 album Skyscraper Souls.
- Provided backing/additional vocals with the B52s on Miranda Lambert's 2022 "Music City Queen" on the album Palomino.
- She sang and appeared in a music video with Pylon Reenactment Society, on the song "Fix It (feat. Kate Pierson)" from the 2024 album Magnet Factory.
- Elettrodomestico is a project by Jane Wiedlin (Go-Go's). Their album ED includes the tracks In Case of Misadventure and Another Day / Another Night. Kate sings on both tracks. Available on Bandcamp since 2024.
- In 2026, Mike Campbell & The Dirty Knobs released the album Mission of Mercy. It includes the track Bongo Mania, which features vocals by Kate.

== Albums ==
- 2015: Guitars and Microphones
- 2024: Radios & Rainbows

== Film and television ==
- The Rugrats Movie (1998, voice only)
- The Flintstones (1994, as "The BC-52's")
- A Matter of Degrees (1990)
- Athens, GA: Inside/Out (1987)
- One Trick Pony (1980)
- Pierson portrayed a club owner in the Flight of the Conchords episode "What Goes on Tour".
- The Adventures of Pete and Pete (1993, "What We Did on Our Summer Vacation")
- Pierson is credited alongside Fred Schneider in the Nickelodeon cartoon Rocko's Modern Life for the theme song vocals.
- Pierson, with the B-52's, appeared in an episode of the CBS soap opera Guiding Light in 1982.
- Pierson, with the B-52's, performed a parody of the song "Love Shack" titled "Glove Slap" in an episode of The Simpsons (1999, "E-I-E-I-(Annoyed Grunt)").
- Phineas and Ferb (2012): performed the song "Spend Half a Day" in the episode "Perry the Actorpus".
- Pierson appears as herself in one episode of Difficult People titled "36 Candles".
