= Komorebi =

"Ko·mo·re·bi"

Single by Hitomi Takahashi

from the album Bamboo Collage
- Released: November 1, 2006
- Genre: J-pop, Rock
- Length: 16:26
- Label: gr8! records
- Songwriter(s): Hitomi Takahashi, Akiko Watanabe
- Producer(s): TAKUYA

Hitomi Takahashi singles chronology
"Communication" (2006)	"Ko·mo·re·bi" (2006)	"Candy Line" (2007)

"Ko·mo·re·bi" (コ・モ・レ・ビ) is Hitomi Takahashi's 5th single under the Sony Records (gr8! records) label. The single was released in one format on November 1, 2006.

== Overview ==
"Ko·mo·re·bi" is Hitomi Takahashi's fifth single. It was used as the theme song for Tegami, a film starring Takayuki Yamada, Tetsuji Tamayama, and Erika Sawajiri. This single also found Hitomi once again working with ex-Judy and Mary member TAKUYA.

The title song is described by CDJapan as "a ballad perfect for the love story in the film", and came with a special, limited letter from Hitomi. The coupling track on the single, "DRIVE", was labeled as "special", because of the many different other artists who worked on the song. Such people include SHOGO (175R) arranging the music, TAKUYA producing the music, TEPPEI (from 3.6MILK) on the guitars, SATOSHI (from 3.6MILK) on the bass guitar, and MOBY (from SCOOBIE DOO) on the drums. The song is described as being about life-size music. Also, though Hitomi has co-written the lyrics of most of her other songs, "Drive" is the first song where the lyrics are completely written by her.

Musically, "Ko·mo·re·bi" has a different tone than Hitomi's past singles. The title song is a mid-tempo ballad, unlike any song that Hitomi has ever done; even the previous ballad song "evergreen" had a heavy rock influence to it, while this song leans towards a more 'traditional' ballad. The b-side, however, is heavily rock-influenced song, reminiscent of such songs such as "Bōkensha" and "Subarashiki Kono Sekai".

Sample of the translated lyrics:

I'll hold your hand like this forever
I don't care if a cold wind sometimes blows
You taught me
That tears aren't for sorrow

== Music video ==
A screen capture of the music video.

The music video for Ko·mo·re·bi aired for the public on MTV "M-SIZE" on October 23, 2006. The PV was filmed around the Mount Fuji area, and was directed by AT. The video starts off with Hitomi walking into a recording studio. She then proceeds to place headphones on, and begins singing into a microphone with a stand holding the lyrics of the song in front of her. The camera rotates 360° around her, and soon the recording studio fades in and out of a misty forest area. Other scenes show Hitomi singing in the forested area without the studio equipment, along with scenes of the scenery, as well (particularly the sunlight shining through the trees - 木漏れ日 (komorebi) means in Japanese the light filtering through the trees). The fading in and out of the studio occurs numerous times, until the song is finally over - Hitomi walks out of the studio, and a single green leaf falls on the chair she had been standing in front of.

Another version of the PV was filmed with clips from the movie "Tegami" in it.

== Track listing ==
1. "コ・モ・レ・ビ" - 4:50
  Lyrics by Hitomi Takahashi & Akiko Watanabe
2. "Drive" – 3:22
  Lyrics by Hitomi Takahashi
3. "コ・モ・レ・ビ (Instrumental)" – 4:49
4. "Drive (Instrumental)" – 3:22

== Personnel ==
- Hitomi Takahashi - vocals on all tracks
- TAKUYA - guitars on tracks 1 and 2
- Jun Umeda (梅田 潤) - bass on track 1
- TEPPEI (3.6MILK) - guitars on track 2
- SATOSHI (3.6MILK) - bass on track 2
- Okamoto "MOBY" Takuya (SCOOBIE DO) - drums on track 2
- SHOGO (175R) - music arrangement on track 2

== Charts ==
Oricon Sales Chart (Japan)

Release	Chart	Peak Position	First Week Sales	Sales Total	Chart Run
1 November 2006	Oricon Daily Singles Chart				
1 November 2006	Oricon Weekly Singles Chart	#50	2,457	2,457+	2 weeks
