= Communication (Hitomi Takahashi song) =

"Communication コミュニケイション"

Single by Hitomi Takahashi

from the album Bamboo Collage
- Released: July 12, 2006
- Recorded: STUDIO SOUND DALI, C MUSIC Studio, MIT Studio
- Genre: J-pop, Rock
- Length: 23 min 08 s
- Label: gr8! records
- Songwriters: Hitomi Takahashi, Akiko Watanabe, april pool & Youichi Kuramochi
- Producer: TAKUYA

Hitomi Takahashi singles chronology
"Aozora no Namida" (2005)	"Communication コミュニケイション" (2006)	"Ko·mo·re·bi" (2006)

"Communication" is Hitomi Takahashi's 4th single under the Sony Records (gr8! records) label. The single was released in only one format on July 12, 2006, nearly eight months after her last single Aozora no NAMIDA.

== Overview ==
"Communication (コミュニケイション, Komyunikeishon)" is Hitomi's fourth single, and, as of now, is her least successful single. "Communication", the a-side, was being used as the ending theme song for the Japanese TV show "MUSIC FIGHTER" during the month of July 2006. Like her past single "evergreen", this single has failed to enter the Daily Top 20 on the Oricon Charts and even failed to enter the Weekly Top 30, its position being a weak #60. Most fans blame this on the lack of promotion Sony gave this single; an example being that there were no TV performances. However, it ranked #6 on the "This Week's Sony Music, CD Chart! Best 10!!!" for the week of 7/10~7/16.

This single marks Takahashi's beginning partnership with ex-Judy and Mary member Takuya, who produced and arranged the first two tracks on the single. The 3rd track is a cover of the song that was originally sung by the Magokoro Brothers. The entire single is described as a "new breed rock", which includes the genres of rock, emo, punk, and reggae. Lyrically, the a-side song deals with the notion that communication is extremely important in any kind of relationship, hence the title "Communication". The musical aspect of the song showcases Takahashi's quick change from singing pop/rock music to punk/rock music.

Sample of the translated lyrics:

I want to laugh with you, I want to trust you, and I don't care if it hurts
I want to understand you more - I can't hold back this communication
It's not enough, everything's not enough, I want to keep going
As I take the first step, the scenery changes, just start the communication

== Music video ==
A screen capture of the music video.

The PV, promotional video, for "Communication" aired on the channel MO-N SAKIDORI on June 29, 2006, at midnight. Like her last two PVs, this PV was directed by AT, and was filmed at Saitama University. In this PV, which is much more simple than her previous PVs, both Hitomi and her band are showcased in a white room with glass windows in the background. The first half of the PV has Hitomi singing in front of a microphone with large speakers behind her; the camera is constantly switching its view on Hitomi. The next half of the PV shows Hitomi singing around many light bulbs, with the band playing behind her. From there, the PV switches scenes from the white room to the darkroom with light bulbs surrounding Hitomi.

== Track listing ==
1. "Communication (コミュニケイション)" - 5:14
  Lyrics by Hitomi Takahashi & Akiko Watanabe
  Music and arrangement by Takuya
2. "sunshine" - 5:15
  Lyrics by April pool
  Music and arrangement by Takuya
3. "Subarashiki Kono Sekai (素晴らしきこの世界)" - 7:18
  Lyrics and music by Youichi Kuramochi
  Arrangement by Koji Igarashi
4. "コミュニケイション -Instrumental-" - 5:14

== Personnel ==
- Hitomi Takahashi - vocals (All tracks) & harp (Track #3)
- TAKUYA - guitars (Tracks #1 & #2)
- Koji Igarashi - keyboards (Tracks #1, #2, & #3)
- Ninji - bass (Track #1)
- Takashi Furuta - drums (Tracks #1 & #2)
- Hiroshi Udagawa - bass (Track #2)
- Kazuyoshi Baba - guitars (Track #3)
- Michitarou - bass (Track #3)
- Keiji Masuoka - drums (Track #3)

== Production ==
- Producer - TAKUYA
- Directors - Kazuma Jo, Taku Sugawara
- A&R - Naoki Yoshitake
- A&R Chief - Takashi Nakamura

== Charts ==
Oricon Sales Chart (Japan)

Chart	Peak Position	First Week Sales	Sales Total
Oricon Daily Singles Chart			
Oricon Weekly Singles Chart	#60	2,142	2,142+
Oricon Yearly Singles Chart			
