= Candy Line =

"Candy Line (キャンディ・ライン)"

Single by Hitomi Takahashi

from the album Bamboo Collage
- Released: March 7, 2007
- Genre: Punk/J-pop/Rock
- Length: 15 min 50 s
- Label: gr8! records
- Songwriter(s): Hitomi Takahashi, Kuwahara Yasunobu
- Producer(s): TAKUYA

Hitomi Takahashi singles chronology
"Ko·mo·re·bi" (2006)	"Candy Line (キャンディ・ライン)" (2007)	"Jet Boy Jet Girl" (2007)

"Candy Line" is Hitomi Takahashi's 6th single under the Sony Records (gr8! records) label, and was released on March 7, 2007, four months after her previous single "Ko·mo·re·bi."

== Overview ==
"Candy Line (キャンディ・ライン, Kyandei Rain)" is Hitomi Takahashi's 6th single, and is the 4th ending theme song to the anime Gintama as of January 7. The single came with a wide "Gintama" sticker, along with an original "Gintama" calendar that dates from April 2007 to March 2008. Also, to commemorate the release of this single, Hitomi held a special live titled HITOMI TAKAHASHI LIVE "Candy Line" on March 29, where Takuya made a guest appearance. For promotion of this single, various commercials with Gintoki from Gintama and Hitomi Takahashi herself have aired on Japanese televisions.

As her previous two singles, "Candy Line" is produced by ex-Judy and Mary member TAKUYA. The main song is described as a pop rock tune, which will remind the listener of the heyday of Judy and Mary, and will give Hitomi a "new appeal." The b-side song, "Kanjiru Mama," is produced by Gagaga SP member Kuwahara Yasunobu, and is said that it will become the center of attention on the punk scene.

Sample of the translated lyrics:

Ah, you believe in me, you want to love me
Even if I say I'm all right now
You're always waiting for me, unadorned
In a pure, unchanging place, you're laughing
And waiting for me

== Music video ==
The music video for the single first aired on the television show M-ON! on February 15, 2007. The music video was directed by Jun'ya Masuyama.

The music video starts off with Hitomi walking towards a door, and, when she goes to the other side, her outfit changes completely. Hitomi then starts singing in a pink room, where she encounters a variety of different things such as a mimicking pole, a shadow attached to her feet, a skeleton, a guitar playing "lawn man", and four dancing shadows. During the chorus, Hitomi, wearing a red shirt, a long red overcoat with black stripes, and jeans, sings in a darkened room with a skeleton band. The room sparks with electricity during the second chorus and guitar solo. The end of the music video features Hitomi singing in front of the mimicking door again. This time, however, she approaches the door, and looks on the other side. What she finds causes her to gap in horror, though what's behind the door is never revealed to the watcher.

== Track listing ==
1. "Candy Line (キャンディ・ライン)" – 4:03
  Lyrics by Hitomi Takahashi
  Music and arrangement by Takuya
2. "Kanjiru Mama (感じるまま)" – 3:01
  Lyrics and music by Kuwahara Yasunobu
  Arrangement by Takuya
3. "キャンディ・ライン -Instrumental-" – 4:01
4. "感じるまま -Instrumental-" – 3:01
5. "キャンディ・ライン -Gin Tama Ending Mix-" – 1:31

== Personnel ==
- Hitomi Takahashi – vocals (All tracks)
- TAKUYA - guitars (Tracks #1 & #2) & bass (Track #1)
- Kōta Igarashi - drums (Tracks #1 & #2)
- Kuwahara Yasunobu - bass (Track #2)

== Performances ==
- April 15, 2007 - Sakura · Sakura · SAKURA!

== Charts ==
Oricon Sales Chart (Japan)

Release	Chart	Peak Position	First Week Sales	Sales Total	Chart Run
7 March 2007	Oricon Daily Singles Chart	#12			
7 March 2007	Oricon Weekly Singles Chart	#14	11,484	15,002	2 weeks
