= Yuki (singer) =

Japanese singer

- Born: 磯谷有希 (Isoya Yuki); February 17, 1972 (age 54); Hakodate, Hokkaido, Japan
- Genres: Pop; rock
- Occupations: Singer; songwriter
- Years active: 1991–present
- Label: Sony Music Entertainment Japan (formerly)
- Formerly of: Judy and Mary; NiNa; Mean Machine
- Spouse: Yoichi Kuramochi (m. 2000)
- Website: yukiweb.net

Yuki Kuramochi (倉持 有希, Kuramochi Yuki; born February 17, 1972), known professionally as Yuki (stylized as YUKI), is a Japanese singer. She is best known as the lead vocalist for Judy and Mary. She founded Judy and Mary in 1991 and became a solo artist in 2002. She has also been a member of the bands NiNa (1999, with Kate Pierson of the B-52's, bassist Mick Karn of Japan, former members of the Japanese New Wave band the Plastics Masahide Sakuma and Takemi Shima, and session drummer Steven Wolf) and Mean Machine (alongside Chara, 2001).

== Biography ==
Yuki was born Yuki Isoya (磯谷 有希, Isoya Yuki) in Hakodate, Hokkaido. After graduating from Hakodate Otani College, she worked as a beautician. She met Yoshihito Onda who visited Hakodate to make a movie, The Triple Cross. The meeting triggered the formation of Judy and Mary in 1992. After Judy and Mary disbanded, Yuki made her solo debut in 2002. She married Magokoro Brothers frontman Yoichi Kuramochi in September 2000, and gave birth to her first child, a boy, on April 18, 2003. However, the child died from unknown causes (SIDS) on March 17, 2005. She gave birth to a second child on August 29, 2006, and a third child in June 2009.

== Backup band ==
=== Band Astro ===
They perform in her tour or recording.

- Guitar: Jun Matsue (Spoozys)
- Drums: Atsushi Matsushita (Zazen Boys)
- Bass: Hiroharu Kinoshita (ex. L⇔R, curve509)
- All keyboard instruments: Makoto Minagawa (ex Shiina Ringo)
- DJ / manipulator: Yohei Tsukasaki

=== The Urah ===
They performed in her tour or recording in 2010.

- All keyboard instruments: Kiyohide Ura (ex Diamond Head)
- Guitar: Tsuneo Imahori
- Guitar: Akihito "Akkin" Suzuki (ex. Heart Bazaar, ex Shiina Ringo, ex Kaela Kimura)
- Bass: Kenji Ueda (ex. The Pillows)
- Drums: Tsuyoshi Miyagawa

== Discography ==
=== Original albums ===
Year	Album information	Chart positions	Total sales	Certifications (sales thresholds)
2002	Prismic: Released: March 27, 2002; Label: Epic (ESCL-2300); Formats: CD, digital download	3	298,240	Gold
2003	Commune: Released: March 26, 2003; Label: Epic (ESCL-2400); Formats: CD, digital download	11	90,000	Gold
2005	Joy: Released: February 23, 2005; Label: Epic (ESCL-2634); Formats: CD, digital download	1	343,000	Platinum
2006	Wave: Released: September 6, 2006; Label: Epic (ESCL-2865); Formats: CD, digital download	1	358,000	Platinum
2010	Ureshikutte Dakiau yo (うれしくって抱きあうよ; "Happily Holding Each Other"): Released: March 10, 2010; Label: Epic (ESCL-3392); Formats: CD, digital download	1	166,146	Gold
2011	Megaphonic: Released: August 24, 2011; Label: Epic (ESCL-3756~3757, ESCL-3758); Formats: CD, digital download	1	119,980	Gold
2014	Fly: Released: September 17, 2014; Label: Epic (ESCL-4277~8, ESCL-4279); Formats: CD, digital download	2	58,591	
2017	Mabataki (まばたき; "Blink"): Released: March 15, 2017; Label: Epic (ESCL-4837~9, ESCL-4840, ESJL-3088~9, ESTL-4); Formats: CD, digital download, LP	1	50,888 (phy.); 8,544 (dig.)	
2019	For me: Release: February 6, 2019; Label: Epic; Formats: Digital download	5	29,783 (phy.); 5,340 (dig.)	
2021	Terminal: Released: April 28, 2021; Label: Epic; Formats: CD, digital download	2 (phy.); 1 (dig.)	22,909 (phy.); 2,972 (dig.)	
2023	Parade ga Tsuzukunara (パレードが続くなら; "If the Parade Goes On"): Released: February 1, 2023; Label: Epic; Formats: CD, digital download	7 (phy.)	11,371 (phy.); 802 (dig.)	
2024	Slits: Released: June 12, 2024; Label: Epic; Formats: CD, digital download	5	12,053 (phy.)	

=== Other albums ===
Year	Album information	Chart positions	Total sales	Certifications
2007	Five-star: Greatest hits album; Released: October 3, 2007; Label: Epic (ESCL-3015); Formats: CD, digital download	1	362,000	Platinum
2010	Yuki "The Present" 2010.06.14,15 Bunkamura Orchard Hall: Live album; Released: December 1, 2010; Label: Epic (ESCL-3555); Formats: CD, digital download	9	29.982	
2012	Powers of Ten: 10 years greatest hits.; Released: February 1, 2012; Label: Epic (ESCL-3838); Formats: CD, digital download	2	112.818	Gold
2022	Free & Fancy: EP; Released: May 11, 2022; Label: Epic (ESCL-5655); Formats: CD, digital download	9	5,000	
2022	Bump & Grind: EP; Released: November 2, 2022; Label: Epic (ESCL-5658); Formats: CD, digital download	14	5,000	

=== Singles ===
==== As lead artist ====
Release	Title	Notes	Chart positions			Oricon sales	Album
Release	Title	Notes	Oricon singles charts	Billboard Japan Hot 100†	RIAJ digital tracks†	Oricon sales	Album
2002	"The End of Shite"		6	—	—	125,000	Prismic
2002	"Prism" (プリズム, Purizumu)		11	—	—	87,000	Prismic
2002	"66db"	Re-cut single	30	—	—	9,500	Prismic
2002	"Stand Up! Sister" (スタンドアップ！シスター, Sutando Appu! Shisutā)		10	—	—	33,000	Commune
2003	"Sentimental Journey" (センチメンタルジャーニー, Senchimentaru Jānī)		17	—	—	24,000	Commune
2003	"Humming Bird" (ハミングバード, Hamingu Bādo)		23	—	—	11,000	Commune
2004	"Home Sweet Home"		9	—	—	57,000	Joy
2004	"Hello, Goodbye" (ハローグッバイ, Harō Gubbai)		6	—	—	43,000	Joy
2005	"Joy"	Certified Gold for cellphone downloads	10	—	—	61,000	Joy
2005	"Nagai Yume" (長い夢; "Long Dream")	Certified Gold for copies shipped and cellphone downloads	4	—	—	86,000	Wave
2005	"Dramatic" (ドラマチック, Doramachikku)	Certified Gold for copies shipped	2	—	—	77,000	Wave
2005	"Yorokobi no Tane" (歓びの種; "Seeds of Happiness")	Certified Gold for copies shipped	5	—	—	69,000	Wave
2006	"Melancholinista" (メランコリニスタ, Merankorinisuta)		10	—	—	43,000	Wave
2006	"Fugainai ya" (ふがいないや; "Cowardly")		6	—	—	39,000	Wave
2007	"Biscuit" (ビスケット, Bisuketto)	Digital single, certified Gold for cellphone downloads	—	—	18*	—	Five-star
2007	"Hoshikuzu Sunset" (星屑サンセット; "Stardust Sunset")	Certified Gold for cellphone downloads	4	—	36*	44,000	Five-star
2007	"Wonder Line" (ワンダーライン, Wandārain)		4	—	19*	35,000	—
2008	"Kisha ni Notte" (汽車に乗って; "Riding on the Train")		5	9	61*	35,000	Ureshikutte Dakiau yo
2008	"Message" (メッセージ, Messēji)	Digital single	—	46	—	—	—
2009	"Rendezvous" (ランデヴー, Randevū)		6	8	45*	36,000	Ureshikutte Dakiau yo
2009	"Cosmic Box"		6	42	13	30,000	Ureshikutte Dakiau yo
2010	"Ureshikutte Dakiau yo" (うれしくって抱きあうよ; "Happily Holding Each Other")		5	5	8	24,000	Ureshikutte Dakiau yo
2010	"Futari no Story" (２人のストーリー; "Our Story")		4	9	17	27,000	—
2011	"Himitsu" (ひみつ; "Secret")		—	—	—	—	—
2012	"Playball / Sakamichi no Melody" (プレイボール / 坂道のメロディ; "Playball / Melody on the Slope")		—	4	—	—	—
2012	"Watashi no negaigoto" (わたしの願い事; "My wish")		—	—	—	—	—
2013	"STARMANN"		—	—	—	—	—
2014	"Daredemo lonely" (誰でもロンリー; "Everyone lonely")		15	—	—	15,000	FLY
2016	ポストに声を投げ入れて( Mailing Out My Voice)	Ending theme for Pokémon the Movie: Volcanion and the Mechanical Marvel					
2019	"Sunday Girl"	Limited Vinyl Release	44	—	—	1,270	forme
2021	"Baby, it's you / My lovely ghost"	Double A-side Single	7	—	—	7,000	Terminal

*charted on monthly Chaku-uta Reco-kyō Chart
†Japan Hot 100 established February 2008, RIAJ Digital Track Chart established April 2009

==== As featured artist ====
Release	Title	Chart positions		Oricon sales	Album
Release	Title	Oricon singles charts	Billboard Japan Hot 100	Oricon sales	Album
1999	"Ai no Hi Mittsu Orange" (愛の火 3つ オレンジ; "Fire of Love, Three, Orange") (Chara+Yuki)	6	—	230,000	—
2010	"Bedtime Story" (ベッドタイムストーリー, Beddotaimu Sutōrī) (Jazztronik feat. Yuki)	27	53	4,400	TBA

=== DVDs ===
- Yuki Videos (ユキビデオ) (March 2, 2005)
- Sweet Home Rock'n Roll Tour (March 2, 2005)
- Yuki Live Yuki Tour "Joy", May 20, 2005 at Nippon Budokan (ユキライブ YUKI TOUR "joy" 2005年5月20日 日本武道館) (January 25, 2006)
- Yuki Videos 2 (ユキビデオ2) (March 19, 2008)
- Yuki Live "5-star": The Gift Will Suddenly Arrive (May 28, 2008)
- Yuki concert New Rhythm Tour 2008 (March 4, 2009)

=== Books ===
- Yuki Girly Rock – Yuki biography (1997)
- Yuki Girly Swing – Yuki autobiography & diary (1997)
- Yuki Girly Folk – Yuki biography (2000)
- Yuki Girly Boogie – Yuki autobiography & diary (2000)
- Yuki Girly Wave – Yuki biography (2004)
- Yuki Girly Tree – Yuki autobiography & diary (2004)

== Appearances ==
=== Movies ===
- Mizu no Onna (水の女; Water Woman) – cameo appearance

=== Radio ===
- Yuki: Hello! New World (2017–present)
