= Ayumi Ito =

Japanese actress (born 1980)

- 伊藤 歩
- Born: April 14, 1980 (age 46); Tokyo, Japan
- Occupation: Actress
- Years active: 1993–present
- Agent: Twin Planet
- Spouse: Yusuke Hosoya (m. 2026)

Ayumi Ito (伊藤 歩, Itō Ayumi; born April 14, 1980) is a Japanese actress from Tokyo, Japan.

== Career ==
Ito played a supporting role in Tokyo!. She also appeared in Kiyoshi Kurosawa's 2012 television drama Penance, and sang in the band Mean Machine.

== Personal life ==
On January 5, 2026, Ito announced her marriage with actor Yusuke Hosoya after two years dating.

== Filmography ==
=== Film ===
- Samurai Kids (1993) – Chizuko Kusubayashi
- Swallowtail (1996) – Ageha
- Dr. Akagi (1998)
- All About Lily Chou-Chou (2001) – Yūko Kuno
- Owl (2003) – Daughter
- Hana and Alice (2004)
- A Day on the Planet (2004) – Kate
- Riyu (2004) – Ayako Takarai
- Kagen no Tsuki (2004) – Sayaka Kamijo
- Curtain Call (2005) – Kaori Hashimoto
- Final Fantasy VII: Advent Children (2005) – Tifa Lockhart (voice)
- Last Order: Final Fantasy VII (2005) – Tifa Lockhart
- The Go Master (2006) – Kazuko Nakahara
- Crickets (2006) – Eiko
- Vanished (2006) – Chie
- Tokyo Tower: Mom and Me, and Sometimes Dad (2007) – Tamama
- Tokyo! (2008) – Akemi
- Be Sure to Share (2009) – Nakagawa Yoko
- Solanin (2010) – Ai Kotani
- Bandage (2010) – Nobuko Yukari
- Gantz (2011) – Eriko Ayukawa
- Soup (2012) – Mika Shibuya
- Konshin (2012) – Tamiko Sakamoto
- The Room (2012) – Yumi
- Yokomichi Yonosuke (2013) – Chiharu
- Flower of Shanidar (2013) – Yurie
- Judge! (2014) – Kiichiro Ota's former girlfriend
- Sekigahara (2017) – Hebishiro/Acha
- Cheer Boys!! (2019) – Satsuki Takagi
- Labyrinth of Cinema (2020) – Yoshiko Kawashima
- Noise (2022) – Chihiro Aoki
- Dr. Coto's Clinic 2022 (2022) – Rika Andō
- Immersion (2023) – Fumiko Ide
- White Flowers and Fruits (2025)
- Gorilla Hall (2025)
- A Place Called Home (2026)
- Chaser Game W: A Match Made in Heaven (2026)
- Ooloo Blue (2026)
- How to Generate a Perfect Crime (2026)

=== Television dramas ===
- Dr. Coto's Clinic (2003) – Rika Andō
- Midnight Diner (2011) – Ikumi/Miku
- Ohisama (2011) – Natsuko Takahashi
- Penance (2012) – Mayu Murakami
- Crime and Punishment: A Falsified Romance (2012) – Yoshio Tachi
- Never Let Me Go (2016) – Ruko Horie
- Poison Daughter, Holy Mother (2019)
- Tokyo Vice (2022–24) – Misaki Taniguchi
- YuYu Hakusho (2023) – Atsuko Urameshi
- Beyond Goodbye (2024) – Midori Tateishi
- The Big Chase: Tokyo SSBC Files (2025) – Yukari Hoshino (ep. 2)
- Romantics Anonymous (2025) – Motomi Kawamura

=== Video games ===
- Kingdom Hearts II (2005) – Tifa Lockhart
- Dirge of Cerberus: Final Fantasy VII (2006) – Tifa Lockhart
- Dissidia 012 Final Fantasy (2011) – Tifa Lockhart
- Final Fantasy Explorers (2014) – Tifa Lockhart
- World of Final Fantasy (2016) – Tifa Lockhart
- Dissidia Final Fantasy Opera Omnia (2017) – Tifa Lockhart
- Itadaki Street: Dragon Quest and Final Fantasy 30th Anniversary (2017) – Tifa Lockhart
- Dissidia Final Fantasy NT (2019) – Tifa Lockhart
- Final Fantasy VII Remake (2020) – Tifa Lockhart
- Crisis Core: Final Fantasy VII Reunion (2022) – Tifa Lockhart
- Final Fantasy VII: Ever Crisis (2023) – Tifa Lockhart
- Final Fantasy VII Rebirth (2024) – Tifa Lockhart
