= Five-Star (album) =

Greatest hits album by Yuki
- Released: October 3, 2007
- Recorded: 2001–2007
- Genre: Pop
- Label: Epic
- Producer: Yuki

Yuki chronology
Wave (2006)	Five-Star (2007)	Ureshikutte Dakiau Yo (2010)

Five-Star, also referred to as Single Collection: Five-Star, is the first greatest hits album by J-pop singer Yuki, released on October 3, 2007 in Japan. This album commemorates the fifth anniversary of her solo debut. The album was released in two formats, a CD only version and a CD+DVD version, which is in a black-and-silver or white-and-gold leather slipcase. The album debuted at number one on the Japanese Oricon Albums Chart and was certified Platinum in the month of its release by the Recording Industry Association of America (RIAJ).

== Track listing ==
Five-Star track listing
No.	Title	Lyrics	Music	Arranger(s)	Length
1.	"The End of Shite"	Aiha Higurashi	Aiha Higurashi	Aiha Higurashi
2.	"Prism (プリズム)"	Yuki	Andy Sturmer	Andy Sturmer, John Fields
3.	"66db"	Yuki	Yuki	Yuki, Atsushi Yuasa
4.	"Stand Up! Sister (スタンドアップ！シスター)"	Yuki	Kiichiro Namba	Shigekazu Aida, Yuki & Prismic Yuki Band
5.	"Sentimental Journey (センチメンタルジャーニー)"	Yuki	Tomoya Matsuura
6.	"Humming Bird (ハミングバード)"	Yuki, Caravan	Caravan	Shigekazu Aida, Strings arranged by Neko Saito
7.	"Home Sweet Home"	Yuki	Yusuke Tanaka	Yusuke Tanaka
8.	"Hello, Goodbye (ハローグッバイ)"	Yuki, Kōichi Tsutaya	Kōichi Tsutaya	Atsushi Yuasa
9.	"Joy"	Yuki, Kōichi Tsutaya	Kōichi Tsutaya	Yusuke Tanaka, Atsushi Yuasa
10.	"Nagai Yume (長い夢, Long Dream)"	Yuki	Tsutaya	Tsutaya
11.	"Dramatic (ドラマチック)"	Yuki	Tsutaya	Tsutaya
12.	"Yorokobi no Tane (歓びの種, Seed of Happiness)"	Yuki	Tsutaya	Masanori Shimada
13.	"Melancholinista (メランコリニスタ)"	Yuki	Tsutaya
14.	"Fugainaiya (ふがいないや, Worthless)"	Yuki	Tsutaya	Kenji Tamai, Atsushi Yuasa
15.	"Hoshikuzu Sunset (星屑サンセット, Stardust Sunset)"	Yuki	mugen	Yuki, Kenji Tamai, Atsushi Yuasa, mugen, Strings arranged by Ittetsu Gen
16.	"Biscuit (ビスケット)" (bonus track)	Yuki	Kōichi Tsutaya	Yuki, Takibie

DVD
No.	Title	Length
1.	"Biscuit" (music video)
2.	"Yukinko (ゆきんこ, Snow Child) Around the World" (episodes 1–12)

== Charts ==
Chart performance for Five-Star
Chart (2007)	Peak position
Japanese Albums (Oricon)	1

== Certifications ==
Certifications for Five-Star
Region	Certification	Certified units/sales
Japan (RIAJ)	Platinum	250,000^{^}
^{^} Shipments figures based on certification alone.

== Release history ==
Release history for Five-Star
Country	Date
Japan	October 3, 2007
