= Guitars and Microphones =

Studio album by Kate Pierson
- Released: February 17, 2015
- Genre: Pop
- Length: 36:39
- Label: Lazy Meadow Music
- Producer: Sia & Tim Anderson

Professional ratings
Aggregate scores
Source	Rating
Metacritic	63/100
Review scores
Source	Rating
MusicOMH	4/5 stars
Pitchfork Media	(6.4/10)

Guitars and Microphones is the debut studio solo album by Kate Pierson of The B-52s. It was released in February 2015 under Lazy Meadow Music.

== Track listing ==
No.	Title	Writer(s)	Length
1.	"Throw Down the Roses"	Dallas Austin, Sia Furler, Kate Pierson	3:28
2.	"Mister Sister"	Furler, Pierson, Nick Valensi	3:09
3.	"Guitars and Microphones"	Christopher Braide, Furler, Pierson	4:24
4.	"Crush Me with Your Love"	Braide, Furler	3:20
5.	"Bottoms Up"	Furler, Pierson, Valensi	2:38
6.	"Bring Your Arms"	Braide, Furler	3:55
7.	"Wolves"	Braide, Pierson	4:14
8.	"Matrix"	Sam Dixon, Furler	4:37
9.	"Time Wave Zero"	Tim Anderson, Furler, Pierson	3:24
10.	"Pulls You Under"	Dallas Austin, Furler, Pierson	3:24
