= Aozora no Namida =

"Aozora no Namida (青空のナミダ)"

Single by Hitomi Takahashi

from the album sympathy
- Released: November 30, 2005
- Recorded: C MUSIC Studio, Studio Sound DALI, MIT Studio
- Genre: J-pop, Rock
- Length: 18 min 00 s (CD); 22 min 36 s (CD+DVD)
- Label: gr8! records
- Songwriters: Hitomi Takahashi, Natsumi Watanabe & mavie
- Producer: Kazuma Jo

Hitomi Takahashi singles chronology
"evergreen" (2005)	"Aozora no Namida (青空のナミダ)" (2005)	"Communication" (2006)

"Aozora no Namida" (青空のナミダ; "Tears of the Blue Sky") is Hitomi Takahashi's third single under the Sony Records label. The single was released on November 30, 2005, in two different formats: CD only and CD+DVD. This is the third retail single to be released for her first album Sympathy.

== Overview ==
"Aozora no Namida" was used as the first opening theme song for the anime Blood+. The single was originally slated to be released on October 12, 2005, but was pushed back to a later date. This is Hitomi's first single to be in two formats, CD only and CD+DVD. On its first day on the Oricon charts, "Aozora no Namida" hit #5, and managed to get #8 for its first week. The music video for this single includes animation of Blood+ made specifically for the video. A rerecorded version of "Aozora no Namida" was recorded in 2007 on her single, "Tsuyoku Nare", and features a stronger punk/rock influence as opposed to the pop/rock influence of the original.

== Music video ==
A screen capture of the music video.

The promotional video for "Aozora no Namida" was directed by AT, and, like her previous two, was filmed at an unknown location. The PV starts off with the main character of Blood+, Saya Otonashi, preparing to fight a Chiropteran. The scene suddenly changes to Hitomi waking up on a staircase, looking around, and then walking down the staircase. The scene changes again to Saya killing the Chiropteran, the scene also constantly switching from Hitomi to this scene as Hitomi continues to "search" around the place. As the PV progresses, Hitomi stumbles upon Saya fighting another Chiropteran, with Saya losing control of her sword. Also, other scenes of Hitomi can be seen; Hitomi sitting on a bunch of rocks with steam around her, and Hitomi singing in a subway-like setting (this is also where the fight against the second Chiropteran takes place). Hitomi grabs the sword and kills the Chiropteran causing Saya to disappear with a smile. The end of the PV features Hitomi walking out onto a cliff to view a city being ravaged by more Chiroptera, her eyes glowing red.

== Track listing ==
CD

1. "Aozora no Namida" (青空のナミダ) - 4:31
  Lyrics by Hitomi Takahashi & Natsumi Watanabe
  Music by Hidenori Tanaka
  Arrangement by Hyoe Yasuhara
2. "Mō Hitotsu no Yoake" (もうひとつの夜明け) - 3:28
  Lyrics by Hitomi Takahashi & mavie
  Music and arrangement by Shinya Saito
3. "My Answer" - 5:23
  Lyrics by mavie
  Music and arrangement by Yuta Nakano
4. "Aozora no Namida -Instrumental-" (Hidenori Tanaka) - 4:31

DVD

1. "Aozora no Namida" (PV) - 4:36

== Personnel ==
- Hitomi Takahashi - vocals

== Production ==
- Producer - Kazuma Jo
- Directors - Kazuma Jo, Taku Sugawara
- Recording - Eiichi Nishizawa (Studio Rine)
- Mixing - Eiichi Nishizawa (Studio Rine)
- Music Video Director - AT (Hinx Minx)

== Performances ==
- 2005 - MBS Anime Fes.'05
- October 29, 2005 - Music Fair 21
- December 10, 2005 - CDTV
- December 18, 2005 - "Sendai 89ers vs. Osaka Evessa" basketball game
- May 7, 2006 - Sony Music Anime Fes.06
- June 11, 2006 - Sony Music Anime Fes.06 at Osaka

== Charts ==
Oricon Sales Chart (Japan)

Release	Chart	Peak Position	First Week Sales	Sales Total	Chart Run
November 30, 2005	Oricon Daily Singles Chart	#5			
November 30, 2005	Oricon Weekly Singles Chart	#8	44,629	83,523	12+ weeks
November 30, 2005	Oricon Yearly Singles Chart				

== RIAJ certification ==
"Aozora no Namida" has been certified gold for shipments of over 100,000 by the Recording Industry Association of Japan.
