= Bokutachi no Yukue =

"Bokutachi no Yukue (僕たちの行方)"

Single by Hitomi Takahashi

from the album sympathy
- Released: April 13, 2005
- Recorded: C MUSIC Studio, Studio Sound DALI, MIT Studio
- Genre: J-pop, Rock
- Length: 19 min 39 s
- Label: gr8! records
- Songwriter(s): Yuta Nakano, Hitomi Takahashi, Natsumi Watanabe & mavie
- Producer(s): Kazuma Jo

Hitomi Takahashi singles chronology
"Bokutachi no Yukue (僕たちの行方)" (2005)	"evergreen" (2005)

"Bokutachi no Yukue" (僕たちの行方, lit. "Our Whereabouts") is Hitomi Takahashi's debut single under Sony Records' (gr8! records) label. The single was released on April 13, 2005, in one format. This is the first retail single for her first album "sympathy."

== Overview ==
"Bokutachi no Yukue" is Hitomi Takahashi's debut single and so far, her most successful single in terms of sales and its Oricon Weekly position. The single became an instant hit, and debuted at #1 for its first week on the Oricon Charts. This made her the second female to have had a debut single reach #1 and the third solo artist to have a debut single reach #1 (in Japan). The single ended up selling well over 100,000 copies. The A-side song "Bokutachi no Yukue" is the 3rd opening theme song for the anime series Gundam SEED Destiny.

When the song was unveiled on the Gundam SEED Destiny official website, the website received so many hits that it had to temporarily shutdown for lack of bandwidth.

The song is a darker pop/rock tune with "violin" type sounds to add gloominess to the song. A guitar is played throughout most of the song, stopping every once in a while for no more than 20 seconds, there is also a long guitar solo after the second chorus is sung. The Kirin part of her song "Kaze no Kirin" is a mystical Chinese creature whose appearance signifies a good omen.

Sample of the translated lyrics:

We keep looking
For our destination, getting lost on the way
Even if we cry from sorrow
Someday it will change to light
'Cause I'm Never Gonna Stop Streak My Dream

== Music video ==
The music video used for "Bokutachi no Yukue" was shot by director Seki Ryuuji. The video has Hitomi singing in a seemingly deserted wasteland. Hitomi is also shown running throughout the video, until she stops in front of a cloaked man. After receiving a white rose from him, everything starts to become blurred as a fierce wind forms from the rose. Once the wind dissipates, she proceeds to follow the man and then the video ends.

== Track listing ==
1. "Bokutachi no Yukue (僕たちの行方)" - 4:31
  Lyrics by Yuta Nakano & shungo.
  Music and arrangement by Yuta Nakano
2. "Kaze no Kirin (風のキリン) (Giraffe of Wind)" - 6:41
  Lyrics by Hitomi Takahashi & Natsumi Watanabe
  Music by Tsutomu Yamasaki
  Arrangement by Shinya Saito
3. "Melody (メロディ)" - 3:50
  Lyrics by Hitomi Takahashi & mavie
  Music by BOUNCEBACK
  Arrangement by Gen Kushizaki
4. "僕たちの行方 -Instrumental- " - 4:31

== Personnel ==
- Hitomi Takahashi - vocals

== Production ==
- Producers - Kazuma Jo
- Director - Kazuma Jo, Taku Sugawara
- Mixing - Eiichi Nishizawa (Studio Rine)
- Hair & Make-up - Mihoko Fujiwara
- Styling - Itoko Shiino
- Photography - Makoto Okuguchi
- Design - Sachie Shibata

== Performances ==
- ?, 2005 - MBS ANIME FES.'05
- April 15, 2005 - PopJam
- April 18, 2005 - C-Toryumon
- April 22, 2005 - Music Station
- April 23, 2005 - CDTV
- May 6, 2005 - Music Fighter
- August 28, 2005 - Bokura no Ongaku♪LIVE
- October 29, 2005 - MUSIC FAIR 21
- March 9, 2006 - Gold Disc Award 2006
- May 7, 2006 - Sony Music Anime Fes.06
- June 11, 2006 - Sony Music Anime Fes.06 at Osaka

== Charts ==
Oricon Sales Chart (Japan)

Release	Chart	Peak Position	First Week Sales	Sales Total	Chart Run
13 April 2005	Oricon Daily Singles Chart	#1			
13 April 2005	Oricon Weekly Singles Chart	#1	60,445	135,898+	14 weeks
13 April 2005	Oricon Yearly Singles Chart	#75			

== RIAJ Certification ==
"Bokutachi no Yukue" has been certified gold for shipments of over 100,000 by the Recording Industry Association of Japan.
