= Sympathy (Hitomi Takahashi album) =

Studio album by Hitomi Takahashi
- Released: March 1, 2006
- Recorded: MIT Studio, C Music Studio, Studio Sound Dali, Sunrise Studio Towerside, Prime Sound Studio Form, Studio Take One
- Genres: Pop rock; power pop; pop punk
- Length: 50:55
- Label: Gr8!
- Producers: Kazuma Jo; Taku Sugawara

Hitomi Takahashi chronology
Sympathy (2006)	Bamboo Collage (2007)

Sympathy is the first album by Japanese singer Hitomi Takahashi. The album was released on March 1, 2006 by Gr8! Records, a division of Sony Music Entertainment Japan, and three singles preceded it.

== Overview ==
Sympathy is the debut original studio album released by Takahashi. The album was released in Japan in two formats, CD+DVD and CD only, both of them containing the same cover. As information about the album was unveiled, Hitomi's Official Site announced that the album song "Yakusoku" would be used as the ending theme for the Japanese TV program The Sunday.

The album received much promotion upon its release, an example being that Hitomi appeared on TV many times a day with a message concerning her album. More attempts at promotion were made as Hitomi appeared on various radio programs. In addition to all of this, Hitomi further promoted her album by appearing in a variety of magazines.

Sympathy showcases a wide variety of musical genres, mostly in the pop and rock area. Songs range from pop/rock songs, such as "Get the Future", to the more rock/ballad songs like "Yakusoku". The album even contains a little country music in the song "Koto no Ha". Overall, though, the album remains close to the genre pop/rock that the three singles released before this album contained.

Overall, reception of the album was positive, many people claiming it as wonderful and a success on Hitomi's part. However, the album did not go without complaints. The album was said to be mediocre, and that it would have been better had it been more on the rock side than pop/rock.

== Track listing ==
=== CD ===
1. "Get the Future" – 3:34
  Lyrics, music, and arrangement by Koichi Tsutaya
2. "Aozora no Namida (青空のナミダ) (Tears of the Blue Sky)" – 4:30
  Lyrics by Hitomi Takahashi & Natsumi Watanabe
  Music by Hidenori Tanaka
  Arrangement by Hyoe Yasuhara
3. "Kodoku na Gunshū (孤独な群衆) (Lonely Crowd)" – 3:15
  Lyrics by Hitomi Takahashi & Mavie
  Music and arrangement by Katsuhiko Kurosu
4. "Koto no Ha (コトノハ) (Leaves of Words)" – 5:05
  Lyrics by Akiko Watanabe
  Music by Jun Ichikawa
  Arrangement by Masanori Shimada
5. "Evergreen" – 5:17
  Lyrics by Hitomi Takahashi & Hidenori Tanaka
  Music by Hidenori Tanaka
  Arrangement by Tomoji Sogawa
6. "Beatin'" – 4:08
  Lyrics by Hitomi Takahashi & Mavie
  Music and arrangement by Tomoki Kikuya
7. "Melody (メロディ)" – 3:48
  Lyrics by Hitomi Takahashi & Mavie
  Music by BOUNCEBACK
  Arrangement by Gen Kushizaki
8. "Yakusoku (約束) (Promise)" – 5:01
  Lyrics by Hitomi Takahashi & Hiroaki Hayama
  Music and arrangement by Hiroaki Hayama
9. "Mou Hitotsu no Yoake (もうひとつの夜明け) (Another Daybreak)" – 3:27
  Lyrics by Hitomi Takahashi & Mavie
  Music and arrangement by Shinya Saito
10. "Skull" – 2:58
  Lyrics by Hitomi Takahashi & Akiko Watanabe
  Music and arrangement by Hyoe Yasuhara
11. "Bokutachi no Yukue (僕たちの行方) (Our Whereabouts) -Album Version-" – 4:31
  Lyrics by Yuta Nakano & Shungo.
  Music and arrangement by Yuta Nakano
12. "16" – 5:00
  Lyrics by Hitomi Takahashi & Mavie
  Music by Yuta Nakano
  Arrangement by Masanori Shimada

=== DVD ===
1. "Bokutachi no Yukue" (僕たちの行方; music video)
2. "Evergreen" (music video)
3. "Aozora no Namida" (青空のナミダ; music video)

== Personnel ==
=== Musicians ===
- Hitomi Takahashi – vocals
- Koichi Tsutaya – keyboards, programming, and backing vocals (Track 1)
- A_S_E – guitars (Track 1)
- Takeshi Taneda – bass guitar (Tracks 1 and 4)
- Takashi Furuta – drums (Track 1)
- Hyoe Yasuhara – keyboards and programming (Tracks 2 and 10)
- Kazuyoshi Baba – guitars (Tracks 2, 3, 4 and 8)
- Rei Shimizu – bass guitar (Tracks 2 and 10)
- Kazutaka Kiritoshi – drums (Tracks 2, 7, 8 and 9)
- Katsuhiko Kurosu – programming (Track 3)
- Koji Igarashi – keyboards (Tracks 3 and 6)
- Kazuhiro Sunaga – bass guitar (Tracks 3 and 8)
- Masuke Nozaki – drums (Tracks 3 and 5)
- Masanori Shimada – keyboards and programming (Tracks 4 and 12)
- Tomoyasu Kawamura – drums (Track 4)
- Tomoji Sogawa – keyboards and programming (Track 5)
- Yoshihiko Chino – guitars (Track 5)
- Naoya Emi – bass guitar (Track 5)
- Tomoki Kikuya – programming and guitars (Track 6)
- Toshihisa Tanaka – bass guitar (Track 6)
- Yasuo Sano – drums (Track 6)
- Marico Harada – backing vocals (Track 6)
- Gen Kushizaki (No-torious) – keyboards, programming, guitars and bass guitar (Track 7)
- Hiroaki Hayama – keyboards and programming (Track 8)
- Shinya Saito – keyboards and programming (Track 9)
- Yutaka Ishii – guitars and bass guitar (Track 9)
- Takamichi Tsugei – guitars (Track 10)
- Kaori Kobayashi – drums (Track 10)
- Yuta Nakano – keyboards and programming (Track 11)
- Kohei Tsuda – guitars (Track 11)
- Takashi Yonekura – guitars (Track 11)
- Mio Okamura – violins (Track 11)
- Yoshiaki Kanoh – guitars (Track 12)
- Sting Miyamoto – bass guitar (Track 12)
- Masayuki Muraishi – drums (Track 12)

=== Production ===
- Directors of songs – Kazuma Jo and Taku Sugawara
- Art direction – Hiroyuki Yui (elaion Inc.)
- Design – Sachie Shibata (bold Co., Ltd.)
- Photography – Hidemi Ogata
- Styling – Itoko Shiino
- Hair and make-up – Mihoko Fujiwara (Ritz)
- Illustration – Frederic Thomain

== Charts ==
Album – Oricon Sales Chart (Japan)

Release	Chart	Peak position	First week sales	Sales total
1 March 2006	Oricon Daily Albums Chart	7		
1 March 2006	Oricon Weekly Albums Chart	10	24,283	39,347+
1 March 2006	Oricon Monthly Albums Chart	30		

Singles – Oricon Sales Chart (Japan)

Release	Single	Chart	Peak position
13 April 2005	"Bokutachi no Yukue"	Oricon Daily Singles Chart	1
13 April 2005	"Bokutachi no Yukue"	Oricon Weekly Singles Chart	1
10 August 2005	"Evergreen"	Oricon Daily Singles Chart	19
10 August 2005	"Evergreen"	Oricon Weekly Singles Chart	22
30 November 2005	"Aozora no Namida"	Oricon Daily Singles Chart	5
30 November 2005	"Aozora no Namida"	Oricon Weekly Singles Chart	8
