= Evergreen (Hitomi Takahashi song) =

Single by Hitomi Takahashi

from the album Sympathy
- Released: August 10, 2005
- Recorded: C Music Studio, Studio Sound Dali, MIT Studio
- Genre: J-pop; rock
- Length: 19:02
- Label: Gr8!
- Songwriter(s): Hitomi Takahashi; Hidenori Tanaka; Mavie
- Producer(s): Kazuma Jo

Hitomi Takahashi singles chronology
"Bokutachi no Yukue" (2005)	"Evergreen" (2005)	"Aozora no Namida" (2005)

"Evergreen" is the second single by Japanese singer Hitomi Takahashi released under the Sony Records (gr8! records) label. The single was released on August 10, 2005, in one format. This is the second retail single to be released from her first album Sympathy.

== Overview ==
"Evergreen" is the second single released by Takahashi. The A-side song was used as the first theme song for the Japanese TV drama New Kids War. Though this single did not sell as well as her first, it still managed to appear in the top 30 on the Japanese Oricon Charts and overall almost sold 30,000 copies. "Evergreen" is currently her third best selling single in terms of sales.

The title song is a ballad, in which Takahashi sings about how the world changes, but memories will always stay the same. A guitar is used throughout the song, and a piano can also be heard playing during the song. In addition, unlike her previous A-side, the lyrics for "Evergreen" were partially penned by Takahashi herself. In contrast, the B-side song, "Bōkensha", is a fast-paced pop-rock song, which, though it has never appeared on an album, is frequently used during her live shows.

Sample of the translated lyrics:

The wet tracks in the twilight
That summer we walked hand in hand is still within me even now
I'll never, never forget
The countless stories you gave me will cross time and we
Will surely meet again; believe in a miracle

== Music video ==
The music video for "Evergreen" was directed by AT, and was filmed somewhere in Hokkaido. The PV starts with Hitomi walking through a field, the camera only showing her legs. Once the song starts, the first verse and chorus of the PV features a close-up of Hitomi singing with a sunset background behind her. As the PV progresses to the instrumental, another scene emerges with Hitomi in a field with hills in the background. When the instrumental ends, the PV switches between the two scenes. The ending of the PV features two birds flying off into the sky. Also, so far there is no full-length version of the PV.

== Track listing ==
1. "Evergreen" – 5:19
  Lyrics by Hitomi Takahashi & Hidenori Tanaka
  Music by Hidenori Tanaka
  Arrangement by Tomoji Sogawa
2. "Bōkensha (冒険者)" – 4:11
  Lyrics by Hitomi Takahashi & mavie
  Music by Hyoei Yasuhara
  Arrangement by Hyoei Yasuhara
3. "Evergreen" (instrumental) – 5:19
4. "(冒険者)" (instrumental) – 4:11

== Personnel ==
=== Musicians ===
- Hitomi Takahashi – vocals
- Yoshihiko Chino – guitars
- Tomoji Sogawa – keyboards, APF and programming
- Naoya Emi – bass guitar
- Masuke Nozaki – drums
- Takamichi Tsugei – guitars
- Rei Shimizu – bass guitar
- Hyoei Yasuhara – keyboards and programming

=== Production ===
- Producer – Kazuma Jo
- Directors – Kazuma Jo, Taku Sugawara
- Mixing – Eiichi Nishizawa (Studio Rine)
- Music video director – AT (Hinx Minx)

== Performances ==
- August 19, 2005 – Music Fighter
- August 20, 2005 – CDTV
- August 28, 2005 – Bokura no Ongaku♪Live
- October 29, 2005 – Music Fair 21
- April 15, 2007 – Sakura · Sakura · Sakura!

== Charts ==
Oricon Sales Chart (Japan)

Release	Chart	Peak position	First week sales	Sales total	Chart run
10 August 2005	Oricon Daily Singles Chart	19			
10 August 2005	Oricon Weekly Singles Chart	22	8,184	29,116	10 weeks
