= Tsuyoku Nare =

"Tsuyoku Nare (強くなれ)"

Single by Hitomi Takahashi

from the album Bamboo Collage
- Released: September 12, 2007
- Genre: Punk/J-pop/Rock
- Length: 14 min 29 s
- Label: gr8! records
- Songwriters: Hitomi Takahashi, mavie, TAKUYA, Natsumi Watanabe

Hitomi Takahashi singles chronology
"Jet Boy Jet Girl" (2007)	"Tsuyoku Nare (強くなれ)" (2007)	"Atashi no Machi, Ashita no Machi" (2008)

"Tsuyoku Nare (強くなれ, Become Strong)" is Hitomi Takahashi's 8th single under the Sony Records (gr8! records) label, and was released on September 12, 2007, just a little over one month after her 7th single "Jet Boy Jet Girl".

== Overview ==
"Tsuyoku Nare (強くなれ)" is the 8th single release by Japanese punk singer, Hitomi Takahashi. The song was known for quite sometime before the announcement of the single, and had already been chosen as the ending theme song for the movie "Hōtai Club". The a-side song was also used as the ending theme song for the Japanese variety TV show, "KING's BRUNCH" during the months of August and September. First pressings of the CD came with a complimentary ticket for the showing of "Hōtai Club", though the ticket was not available for those living outside Japan. Upon its first week of release, "Tsuyoku Nare" charted at #68, making it her lowest charting single to date.

Like the past four singles she has released, the title song was produced by ex-Judy and Mary member Takuya, while the lyrics were personally written by Takahashi herself after she read the original book. As can be heard in the movie's trailers, "Tsuyoku Nare" is a ballad song very similar to "Ko·mo·re·bi". The coupling track is an alternate recording of Hitomi's 2005 single "Aozora no Namida". The new recording of the song gives it a much stronger punk/rock feel to it as opposed to the original version, which was heavily influenced by pop/rock.

== Track listing ==
1. "Tsuyoku Nare (強くなれ)" - 4:47
  Lyrics by Hitomi Takahashi, mavie & Takuya
  Music by Takuya
  Arranged by Takuya
2. "Aozora no NAMIDA (青空のナミダ) -'07 Ver.-" - 4:50
  Lyrics by Hitomi Takahashi & Natsumi Watanabe
  Music by Hidenori Tanaka
  Arranged by Takuya
3. "強くなれ -Instrumental-" - 4:47

== Personnel ==
- Hitomi Takahashi – vocals (All tracks)
- TAKUYA - guitars (Tracks #1 & #2)
- Katsuhiko Kurosu - bass (Track #1)
- Kōta Igarashi - drums (Track #1)
- Koji Igarashi - keyboards (Track #1)
- Steve Etou - percussions (Track #1)
- Hirose HEESEY Yōichi - bass (Track #2)
- Sōru Tooru - drums (Track #2)
- nishi-ken - keyboards (Track #2)

== Performances ==
- July 14, 2007 - King's Brunch

== Charts ==
Oricon Sales Chart (Japan)

Release	Chart	Peak Position	First Week Sales	Sales Total	Chart Run
12 September 2007	Oricon Daily Singles Chart				
12 September 2007	Oricon Weekly Singles Chart	#68			1 week
