= Bamboo Collage =

Studio album by Hitomi Takahashi
- Released: October 24, 2007
- Genre: Pop punk, punk rock, pop rock
- Length: 54:43 (CD)
- Label: gr8! records
- Producer: TAKUYA

Hitomi Takahashi chronology
sympathy (2006)	Bamboo Collage (2007)

Bamboo Collage is Hitomi Takahashi's second album released under gr8! records, a division of Sony Records. The album was released on October 24, 2007, and, like its predecessor, the album came in two versions, CD Only and CD+DVD. There were a total of five singles to promote the album.

== Overview ==
Bamboo Collage is the second original studio album to be released by Japanese punk/rock singer Hitomi Takahashi. The album came out just over a month after the release of her 8th single, "Tsuyoku Nare", and over a year and a half after her debut album "sympathy". The album contains a total of six new songs - the other seven were already released on the five singles released for the album's promotion. As with the singles released for this album, all songs were produced by Takuya, while music and lyrics were written by punk/rock artists such as shogo.k from 175R and Maeda and Yamamoto from GagagaSP.

Unlike her debut album, nearly every song on Bamboo Collage falls in the punk/rock genre, while only containing one true ballad song. The album even contains the genre of ska in the song "Breakthrough" - a genre that Takahashi had never before attempted. The version of "Ko·mo·re·bi" that appears on the album is modified so that it is no longer the ballad song it once was, but is now a punk/rock version to fit with the rest of the album.

== Track listing ==
=== CD Portion ===
1. "Graduation (グラデュエイション)" – 5:16
  Lyrics, music, and arrangement by Takuya
2. "Candy Line (キャンディ・ライン)" – 4:02
  Lyrics by Hitomi Takahashi
  Music and arrangement by Takuya
3. "Pride" – 3:35
  Lyrics and music by shogo.k
  Arrangement by Takuya
4. "Breakthrough (ブレイクスルー)" – 3:09
  Lyrics by Kohei Japan
  Music and arrangement by Takuya
5. "Yoru no Melody (夜のメロディ)" – 5:36
  Lyrics and music by Satoshi Yamamoto
  Arrangement by Takuya
6. "Tsuyoku Nare (強くなれ)" – 4:47
  Lyrics by Takuya, Hitomi Takahashi, & mavie
  Music and arrangement by Takuya
7. "Renai Kyou no Uta (恋愛狂の歌)" – 3:27
  Lyrics and music by Cozakku Maeda
  Arrangement by Takuya
8. "Selection (セレクション)" – 3:10
  Lyrics by Hitomi Takahashi & Hidenori Tanaka
  Music by Kou Heiya
  Arrangement by Takuya
9. "Communication (コミュニケイション)" – 5:10
  Lyrics by Hitomi Takahashi & Akiko Watanabe
  Music and arrangement by Takuya
10. "Ko·mo·re·bi (コ･モ･レ･ビ) -Bamboo Ver.-" – 4:16
  Lyrics by Hitomi Takahashi & Akiko Watanabe
  Music and arrangement by Takuya
11. "Jet Boy Jet Girl" – 4:34
  Lyrics by Hitomi Takahashi & mavie
  Music and arrangement by Takuya
12. "Stay Tune" – 4:11
  Lyrics by Kohei Japan
  Music and arrangement by Takuya
13. "Kanjiru Mama (感じるまま)" – 3:02
  Lyrics and music by Kuwahara Yasunobu
  Arrangement by Takuya

=== DVD Portion ===
1. "Communication (コミュニケイション)" (music video)
2. "Ko·mo·re·bi (コ･モ･レ･ビ)" (music video)
3. "Candy Line (キャンディ・ライン)" (music video)
4. "Jet Boy Jet Girl" (music video)
5. "Tsuyoku Nare (強くなれ)" (music video)

== Personnel ==
- Hitomi Takahashi - vocals (All tracks)
- B-side Boys - backing vocals (Track #4)
- TAKUYA - guitars (All tracks), bass (Track #2), programming (Tracks #2, #3, & #11), & keyboards (Track #3 & #11)
- Hirose "HEESEY" Yōichi - bass (Tracks #1, #4, #5, #7, #8, #10, & #12)
- Sōru Tōru - drums (Tracks #1, #4, #5, #7, #8, #10, & #12)
- nishi-ken - keyboards (Tracks #1, #4, #7, #8, #10, #11, & #12)
- Kōta Igarashi - drums (Tracks #2, #3, #6, #11, & #13)
- Katsuhiko Kurosu - bass (Tracks #3, #6, & #11)
- Ken Iikawa (LONG SHOT PARTY) - trumpet (Track #4)
- kj (LONG SHOT PARTY) - sax (Track #4)
- Koji Igarashi - keyboards (Tracks #5, #6, & #9)
- Steve Etou - percussions (Track #6)
- Ninji - bass (Track #9)
- Takashi Furuta - drums (Track #9)
- Kuwahara Yasunobu- bass (Track #13)

== Production ==
- Directors - Kazuma Jo & Taku Sugawara
- Art Direction - Junya Mathyama
- Jacket Design - Saori "hammer" Hamanaka
- Styling - Mika Nagasawa
- Hair & Make-up - Naoki Katagiri

== Charts ==
Album - Oricon Sales Chart (Japan)

Release	Chart	Peak position	First week sales	Sales total
24 October 2007	Oricon Daily Albums Chart	37		
24 October 2007	Oricon Weekly Albums Chart	#63	3,000	5,000+

Singles - Oricon Sales Chart (Japan)

Release	Single	Chart	Peak position
12 July 2006	"Communication"	Oricon Weekly Singles Chart	60
1 November 2006	"Ko·mo·re·bi"	Oricon Weekly Singles Chart	50
7 March 2007	"Candy Line"	Oricon Weekly Singles Chart	14
1 August 2007	"Jet Boy Jet Girl"	Oricon Weekly Singles Chart	33
12 September 2007	"Tsuyoku Nare"	Oricon Weekly Singles Chart	68
