= Hitomi Takahashi (singer) =

Japanese singer (born 1989)

Hitomi Takahashi 高橋 瞳
- Born: April 8, 1989 (age 37)
- Origin: Shiogama, Miyagi, Japan
- Genres: Pop rock; pop punk; power pop; punk rock
- Occupations: Singer; lyricist
- Instrument: Vocals
- Years active: 2005–present
- Label: gr8 Records!
- Website: http://www.takahashihitomi.com/

Hitomi Takahashi (高橋 瞳, Takahashi Hitomi; born April 8, 1989) is a Japanese pop rock singer from Shiogama, Miyagi. She is best known by her songs "Bokutachi no Yukue" and "Aozora no Namida", which were theme songs to animation programs Gundam Seed Destiny and Blood+, respectively. With the former, she became the third artist in to top the Oricon charts with a debut single.

== Biography ==
=== Pre-Debut ===
Hitomi Takahashi was born on April 8, 1989, in the Miyagi Prefecture of Japan. By the influence of her father, she grew up listening to his favorite music, which was classic rock such as Eric Clapton and the Beatles.

In 2002, she entered junior-high/middle school. Upon entrance, Hitomi joined the school softball team and joined kendo, where she obtained the level of sho-dan. It was during these years that she expressed an interest in becoming an artist's backup dancer, and began dancing with her friends.

During a karaoke singing event in 2003, Hitomi's friends encouraged her to sing live. Though she expressed a disliking for singing karaoke in front of a large crowd, she eventually sang because of her friend's encouragement, and from that time on the desire to become a singer awoke in her. During her second year in junior-high school, in the middle of the summer of 2003, Hitomi applied for the Sony Music Auditions. Because of a change in interest, Hitomi moved from singing dance music to singing rock music.

In 2004, Hitomi was selected as the finalist for the Sony Music SD audition (Vo-che3); 20,000 others had auditioned. She had been worried that because of her height (147 cm), she would be overlooked, but her powerful voice attracted the attention of people while she sang live. The end of 2004 found her being chosen to sing the theme song for Gundam Seed Destiny. Recording of her song "Bokutachi no Yukue" began at the end of the year.

=== Sympathy ===
In 2005, she was in the middle of high school entrance exams as the title for her 1st single "Bokutachi no Yukue" was announced. The single was released in April 2005, and debuted at No. 1 on the Oricon charts. This was a huge success, making Hitomi the second female singer to have a debut single in the number one spot, and the third solo artist to have a debut single reach the top spot. The single ended up selling well over 100,000 copies. Hitomi soon entered Shiogama Girls High School, and started her first radio personality on Date fm (FM Sendai) called Takahashi Hitomi: Sound D・N・A~.

The second single from Hitomi, "Evergreen", was released on August 12, 2005. The song was used as the theme song for the Japanese TV drama "New Kids War". The single sales were much lower than her previous single, with the single debuting at No. 22 on the Japanese Oricon Charts, and selling a little less than 30,000 copies. Takahashi's third single, "Aozora no Namida", was soon released on November 30, 2005, and it was used as the 1st opening theme song for the anime Blood+. (It had originally been planned for an October 12, 2005 released, but was pushed back to the later date.) Its first week on the charts found it at number eight on the Oricon charts with 44,629 copies sold, and it eventually sold over 80,000 copies.

On February 22, Hitomi's Official Fan Club was revealed, the title being a play on the first letter of her name and her height, "H147." Hitomi also won an award at the 20th Japanese Gold Disc Awards for New Artist of the Year, and sang live at the event.

The first studio album from the singer, Sympathy, was released on March 1, 2006. The album came in two formats, CD only and CD+DVD (limited edition), and contained 12 tracks in total, with 7 of them being previously unreleased songs. The album debuted at number ten for its first week on the Oricon Charts, and sold over 30,000 copies. For the release of the album, Hitomi held her first live concert on April 1, 2006. Commenting on how much she enjoyed the concert, Hitomi soon decided to hold more concerts for her "sympathy" album. The concerts were named the Hitomi Takahashi Live "Sympathy" ~BOXX Series~, and became a way for her to promote new songs. In total, the tour had six lives.

=== Bamboo Collage ===
Hitomi released her 4th single "Communication" on July 12, 2006. The song was the ending theme song for "MUSIC FIGHTER" during the month of July 2006. Once finally released, this single failed to make it in the Top 20 Daily Charts. It also failed to make it in the Weekly Top 30, and was revealed to debut at number sixty on the charts, selling a little more than 2,000 copies in its first week.

It was during the eighth month of 2006 that news of a new single surfaced. This single, titled "Ko·mo·re·bi", was officially announced to be Hitomi's 5th single at the end of August, and was used as the theme song for the movie Tegami, which features actors Takayuki Yamada, Tetsuji Tamayama, and Erika Sawajiri. Similar to her past single, "Ko·mo·re·bi" failed to chart in the Top 30 Weekly Charts, and debuted at No. 50 for its first week on the charts, only selling about 300 more copies than "Communication". In spite of this, Hitomi was chosen to be one of many artists to take part in the new tribute album for the new Death Note movie.

Following the release of her two unsuccessful singles was the song "Candy Line", which was officially announced on Christmas Day. The song was chosen to be used as the 4th ending theme for the anime series, Gin Tama. When released, the single became her biggest hit since "Aozora no Namida", and reached No. 14 during its first week on the Oricon charts, and overall was reported as selling over 15,000 copies.

As her 2nd single of 2007, Takahashi released her 7th single, titled "Jet Boy Jet Girl", which was released on August 1, 2007. The title song was the new opening theme song to the anime "Terra e...", and her second single to be released in CD only and CD+DVD formats. The single did not receive the same success as "Candy Line", but sold over double of her 4th and 5th singles.

Takahashi also released a new single a little more than one month after "Jet Boy Jet Girl", with the title "Tsuyoku Nare". The title song, aptly named "Tsuyoku Nare", was used as the ending theme song of the movie "Hōtai Club". As her past four singles, this song was produced by Takuya, and the lyrics were personally written by Takahashi herself. Though heavily promoted via the movie, "Tsuyoku Nare" failed to match the success of her "sympathy" era singles.

Continuing the speedy releasing of material, Takahashi released her 2nd album Bamboo Collage. The album featured all the singles since the release of "Communication", and was her first album to reflect her change from pop rock to punk, a change which was made because her voice was thought to be better suited to the latter genre. As most of the singles released for promotion of this album, "Bamboo Collage" failed to enter the Oricon Weekly Top 30. Despite this, though, Takahashi held her first tour, which consisted of four lives during the early parts of December.

=== Picorinpin ===
Since the album release and tour, Takahashi kept a low profile in the music scene, but was recording for a few months. On March 1, 2008, Takahashi graduated from high school, and moved from Sendai to Tokyo. Her 9th single "Atashi no Machi, Ashita no Machi", released on June 4, 2008, was used as first opening theme song of the anime Toshokan Sensō, while its b-side, "Mother's Song" was used as the ending theme of the NHK BS2 TV show Digital Stadium. After more than a year, September 9, 2009, Takahashi released "Wo Ai Ni" as collaboration with Beat Crusaders. The song was used as the 14th ending theme for anime television series Gin Tama.

On September 28, 2011, Takahashi released her third album, Picorinpin, as her last release with Sony Music Records. The album featured productions of several artists, including Chara, Koji Nakamura and Rolly Teranishi. Picorinpin failed to enter the Top 200 of the Oricon charts, and sold less than 500 copies.

== Discography ==
- Sympathy (2006)
- Bamboo Collage (2007)
- Picorinpin (2011)
