= Judy and Mary =

Japanese rock band

- Origin: Kanagawa, Japan
- Genres: Pop rock; pop punk; noise pop; art pop; alternative rock
- Years active: 1991–2001
- Labels: Chainsaw Records; Epic/Sony Records
- Past members: Yoshihito Onda; Yuki Isoya; Kohta Igarashi; Takuya Asanuma (1993-2001); Taiji Fujimoto (1991-1993)
- Website: official website

Judy and Mary (often stylized as JUDY AND MARY) was a Japanese rock band formed in 1991 in Japan by bassist Yoshihito Onda and vocalist Yuki, with drummer Kohta Igarashi and guitarist Taiji Fujimoto completing the lineup in 1992. Guitarist Takuya replaced Taiji the following year. The band is known for their innovative punk, rock, and pop meldings of noisy but melodic music in the 1990s.

== History ==
In 1992, Judy and Mary released an album and accompanying video, Be Ambitious, on the independent Chainsaw Records label. The band was soon signed by Epic/Sony Records and released their first major label single, "Power of Love", in 1993. The band's major label debut album, J.A.M, was released in 1994. Judy and Mary quickly became one of the most popular bands in Japan. Their song "Sobakasu" was used as the first opening theme for the anime television series Rurouni Kenshin, and sold over a million copies.

Judy and Mary released seven original albums, three compilation albums (through 2006) and twenty-two singles. The band dissolved in March 2001.

Yuki is now enjoying a successful solo career as YUKI. Takuya is also currently a solo artist. Onda joined the band Hot Rod Crue, but since 2008 has been a member, along with Igarashi, of the band Zamza.

A tribute album was released in 2009, with artists such as Tamio Okuda and Halcali covering Judy and Mary's major hits.

== Members ==
Past members

- Yuki (ユキ) = Yuki Isoya (磯谷 有希, Isoya Yuki; born February 17, 1972 in Hokkaido) - vocalist, lyricist
- Yoshihito Onda (恩田 快人, Onda Yoshihito; born December 13, 1963 in Hyogo) - bassist, composer
- Takuya (タクヤ) = Takuya Asanuma (浅沼 拓也, Asanuma Takuya; born September 9, 1971 in Kyoto) - guitarist, lyricist, composer
- Kohta Igarashi (五十嵐 公太, Igarashi Kōta; born January 17, 1963 in Kanagawa) - drums, composer
- Taiji Fujimoto (藤本 泰司, Fujimoto Taiji) - guitarist

== Discography ==
=== Albums ===
==== Studio albums ====
Year	Album Information	Chart positions	Total sales
1992	Be Ambitious: Independently released EP; Released: April 1992; Label: Crown; Re-released December 16, 2000; Re-released September 19, 2001	19*	11,000*
1994	J.A.M.: Released: January 21, 1994; Label: Epic Records Japan (ESCB-1466)	23	189,000
1994	Orange Sunshine: Released: December 1, 1994; Label: Epic Records Japan (ESCB-1555)	5	681,000
1995	Miracle Diving: Released: December 4, 1995; Label: Epic Records Japan (ESCB-1707)	2	939,000
1997	The Power Source: Released: March 26, 1997; Label: Epic Records Japan (ESCB-1805)	1	2,162,000
1998	Pop Life: Released: June 24, 1998; Label: Epic Records Japan (ESCB-1890)	2	1,150,000
2001	Warp: Released: February 7, 2001; Label: Epic Records Japan (ESCB-1890)	1	887,000

*positions from 2001 re-release.

==== Compilation albums ====
Year	Album Information	Chart positions	Total sales
1999	44982 Vs. 1650: 3CD Live album.; Released: March 31, 1999; Label: Epic Records Japan (ESCB-1890)	7	287,000
2000	Fresh: Greatest hits album.; Released: March 23, 2000; Label: Epic Records Japan (ESCB-2110)	1	1,776,000
2001	The Great Escape: Complete Request Best: 2CD greatest hits album.; Released: May 23, 2001; Label: Epic Records Japan (ESCB-2230)	1	780,000
2006	Complete Best Album: Fresh: 2CD greatest hits album.; Released: February 13, 2006; Label: Epic Records Japan (ESCB-2230)	2	222,000
2009	15th Anniversary Complete Single Box: 22CD singles box set; Released: August 5, 2009; Label: Epic Records Japan (ESCL-3220)	83	2,000

=== Singles ===
List of singles, with selected chart positions, showing year released, sales, certifications and album name
Title	Year	Peak chart positions	Sales	Certifications	Album
Title	Year	JPN	Sales	Certifications	Album
"Power of Love"	1993	95	3,000	—N/a	J.A.M.
"Blue Tears"	1993	–	—N/a	—N/a	J.A.M.
"Daydream"	1994	58	13,000	—N/a	J.A.M.
"Hello! Orange Sunshine"	1994	22	99,000	—N/a	Orange Sunshine
"Cheeze "Pizza""	1994	15	77,000	—N/a	Orange Sunshine
"Chiisa na Koro Kara" (小さな頃から, Since I Was Little)	1995	37	39,000	—N/a	Orange Sunshine
"Over Drive"	1995	4	670,000	—N/a	Miracle Diving
"Doki Doki" (ドキドキ, Heartbeat)	1995	8	256,000	—N/a	Miracle Diving
"Sobakasu" (そばかす, Freckles) (Note: 1st opening theme song for Rurouni Kenshin)	1996	1	1,058,000	RIAJ: Platinum (streaming)	The Power Source
"Classic" (クラシック, Kurashikku)	1996	3	632,000	—N/a	The Power Source
"Kujira Jū Ni Gō" (くじら12号, Whale No. 12)	1997	5	447,000	—N/a	The Power Source
"Lovely Baby" (ラブリーベイベー, Raburī Beibē)	1997	12	96,000	—N/a	The Power Source
"Lover Soul"	1997	5	504,000	—N/a	Pop Life
"Sanpomichi" (散歩道, Promenade) (Note: theme song for the television drama News no Onna)	1997	3	479,000	—N/a	Pop Life
"Music Fighter" (ミュージック ファイター, Myūjikku Faitā)	1998	4	148,000	—N/a	Pop Life
"Iro Toridori no Sekai" (イロトリドリ ノ セカイ, World of Various Colors)	1998	11	76,000	—N/a	Pop Life
"Tegami o Kaku yo" (手紙をかくよ, I Write a Letter)	1998	22	22,000	—N/a	Pop Life
"Brand New Wave Upper Ground"	2000	4	158,000	—N/a	Warp
"Hitotsu Dake" (ひとつだけ, Only One)	2000	9	111,000	—N/a	Warp
"Mottö" (More)	2000	8	138,000	—N/a	Warp
"Lucky Pool" (ラッキープール, Rakkī Pūru)	2001	3	183,000	—N/a	Warp
"Peace (Strings Version)"	2001	8	73,000	—N/a	Warp

=== Books/Publications ===
- Jam Book (March 15, 1996)
- Yuki Girly Rock -yuki biography- (1997)
- Yuki Girly Swing -yuki autobiography & diary- (1997)
- Yuki Girly Folk -yuki bio- (2000)
- Yuki Girly Boogie -yuki autobio- (2000)
- Yuki Girly Wave -yuki bio- (2004)
- Yuki Girly Tree -yuki autobio) (2004)
- What's In Jam-Pack (memorial compilation of 'What's In' magazine articles)

== Bibliography ==
- Tetsuishi, Mihoko and Jam (1996). Jam Book. Sony Magazines. ISBN 4-7897-1038-6.
- Isoya, Yuki (February 1997). Girly Swing. Sony Magazines. ISBN 4-7897-1153-6.
- Utsunomiya, Miho and Yuki (February 1997). Girly Rock. Sony Magazines. ISBN 4-7897-1152-8.
- Isoya, Yuki (30 June 2000). Girly Boogie. Sony Magazines. ISBN 4-7897-1565-5.
- Tetsuishi, Mihoko and Yuki (2000). Girly Folk. Sony Magazines. ISBN 4-7897-1566-3.
