= Animals (Sparkadia song) =

Single by Sparkadia

from the album Postcards
- Released: October 14, 2007 (UK); November 10, 2007 (AUS)
- Recorded: 2006/07
- Genre: Indie rock, Alternative rock
- Length: 3:04
- Label: Ark Recordings (UK); Ivy League Records (AUS)
- Songwriter(s): Sparkadia
- Producer(s): Ben Hillier

Sparkadia singles chronology
"Animals" (2007)	"Too Much to Do" (2008)

"Animals" is the debut single taken from Sparkadia's debut album Postcards. The single was released digitally in the UK and in Australia. The single brought recognition to the band and made it onto the Triple J's Hottest 100 playlist of 2007.

== Track list ==
The single was digitally released.

== Chart positions ==
The single was not eligible to chart in either UK or Australia. Although the single was on high rotation on Australian radio program 'Triple J'.

== Music video ==
The music video appears to be a high budget shot video. It is partly animated and features the band performing with mystique backgrounds.
