= Showgirl (disambiguation) =

A showgirl is a dancer or performer in a stage entertainment show.

Showgirl(s) may also refer to:

== Business ==
- Promotional model, a model active at product presentation events, etc.

== Films and plays ==
- Show Girl (1928 film), starring Alice White
- Show Girl (1929 musical), by the Gershwins and others
- The Showgirl, a 1960 Spanish musical film
- Show Girl (1961 musical), by Charles Gaynor
- Showgirls, a 1995 film directed by Paul Verhoeven

== Music ==
- Showgirl (album), a 2004 digital live album by singer Kylie Minogue
- "Show Girl" (The Auteurs song), the debut single by The Auteurs
- "Show Girl" (Slimmy song), a song 2008 on Slimmy's album Beatsound Loverboy
- Showgirl: The Greatest Hits Tour, the first Greatest Hits tour by Kylie Minogue
  - Showgirl (video)
- Showgirl: The Homecoming Tour, the conclusion to Minogue's "Showgirl Tour"
- Showgirls (soundtrack), the soundtrack album to the 1995 film Showgirls
- "Showgirl" (Mumzy Stranger song), a song by Mumzy Stranger, featuring Veronica Mehta, from his 2010 mixtape No Stranger To This

== See also ==
- Showgirl in Hollywood, a 1930 musical comedy/drama film
