= No Control =

No Control may refer to:

== Film ==
- No Control (1927 film), an American film

== Music ==
=== Albums ===
- No Control (Bad Religion album) or the title song, 1989
- No Control (Eddie Money album) or the title song, 1982
- No Control (Turbo Fruits album), 2015
- No Control (Suzi Quatro album), 2019

=== Songs ===
- "No Control", by 311 from Transistor, 1997
- "No Control", by Atreyu from In Our Wake, 2018
- "No Control", by Blackfire, 2002
- "No Control", by Brand New from Science Fiction, 2017
- "No Control", by Bullet for My Valentine from Bullet for My Valentine, 2004
- "No Control", by David Bowie from Outside, 1995
- "No Control", by One Direction from Four, 2014
- "No Control", by Pepper from No Shame, 2006
- "No Control", by Robert Palmer, B-side of "You Blow Me Away", 1994
- "No Control", by Willow from Coping Mechanism, 2022

== See also ==
- "No Controles", a 1983 song by Olé Olé, covered by several other performers
- No Controles (album), by Stereo Total, 2009
