= Showgirl (video) =

2005 live DVD by Kylie Minogue

Kylie Showgirl

Video by Kylie Minogue
- Released: 25 November 2005
- Recorded: 6 May 2005
- Venue: Earl's Court (London, England)
- Genre: Pop music
- Length: 144:00
- Label: EMI
- Director: Russell Thomas
- Producer: Philippa R. Pettett

Kylie Minogue chronology
Ultimate Kylie (2004)	Kylie Showgirl (2005)	White Diamond / Showgirl: Homecoming (2007)

Kylie Minogue chronology
Ultimate Kylie (2004)	Showgirl (2005)	Showgirl: Homecoming Live (2007)

Kylie Showgirl is a live DVD by Australian pop singer Kylie Minogue. Filmed during Minogue's Showgirl: The Greatest Hits Tour on 6 May 2005 at Earls Court Exhibition Centre in London, England, it was released by EMI on 25 November 2005 in Europe.

== Track listing ==
Act 1: Showgirl
No.	Title	Writer(s)	Length
1.	"Overture"	Steve Anderson
2.	"Better the Devil You Know"	Mike Stock; Matt Aitken; Pete Waterman
3.	"In Your Eyes"	Kylie Minogue; Richard Stannard; Julian Gallagher; Ash Howes
4.	"Giving You Up"	Miranda Cooper; Brian Higgins; Tim Powell; Lisa Cowling; Paul Woods; Nick Coler; Minogue
5.	"On a Night Like This"	Steve Torch; Graham Stack; Mark Taylor; Brian Rawling

Act 2: Smiley-Kylie
No.	Title	Writer(s)	Length
6.	"Shocked"	Stock; Aitken; Waterman
7.	"What Do I Have to Do"	Stock; Aitken; Waterman
8.	"Spinning Around"	Ira Shickman; Osborne Bingham; Kara DioGuardi; Paula Abdul

Act 3: Denial
No.	Title	Writer(s)	Length
9.	"In Denial"	Neil Tennant; Chris Lowe
10.	"Je ne sais pas pourquoi"	Stock; Aitken; Waterman
11.	"Confide in Me"	Anderson; Dave Seaman; Owain Barton

Act 4: What Kylie Wants, Kylie Gets
No.	Title	Writer(s)	Length
12.	"Red Blooded Woman" / "Where the Wild Roses Grow"	Johnny Douglas; Karen Poole / Nick Cave
13.	"Slow"	Minogue; Dan Carey; Emilíana Torrini
14.	"Please Stay"	Minogue; Stannard; Gallagher; John Themis

Act 5: Dreams
No.	Title	Writer(s)	Length
15.	"Over the Rainbow"	Harold Arlen; Yip Harburg^{[a]}
16.	"Come into My World"	Rob Davis; Cathy Dennis
17.	"Chocolate"	Douglas; Poole
18.	"I Believe in You"	Minogue; Jason Sellards; Scott Hoffman
19.	"Dreams"	Minogue; Anderson; Seaman

Act 6: Kyliesque
No.	Title	Writer(s)	Length
20.	"Hand on Your Heart"	Stock; Aitken; Waterman
21.	"The Loco-Motion"	Gerald Goffin; Carole King
22.	"I Should Be So Lucky"	Stock; Aitken; Waterman
23.	"Your Disco Needs You"	Minogue; Guy Chambers; Robbie Williams

Encore: Minx in Space
No.	Title	Writer(s)	Length
24.	"Put Yourself in My Place"	Jimmy Harry
25.	"Can't Get You Out of My Head"	Davis; Dennis
26.	"Especially for You"	Stock; Aitken; Waterman
27.	"Love at First Sight"	Minogue; Stannard; Gallagher; Howes; Martin Harrington

Extras
No.	Title	Length
28.	"Behind the Feathers" (backstage documentary)
29.	"Screen Projections" ("Shocked/What Do I Have to Do?/Spinning Around" and "Red Blooded Woman/Where the Wild Roses Grow")
30.	"ROM section" (DVD, weblink, screensavers, desktop wallpaper, and Showgirl gallery)

Notes

- ^{^a} Yip Harburg is miscredited as Hamburg.

== Charts ==
In 2005, Kylie Showgirl was certified 3× Platinum in Australia by the Australian Recording Industry Association, and became the twenty-sixth best selling music DVD in the country. The following year the DVD was re-certified 4× Platinum.

Chart (2005)	Peak position
Australian Music DVD (ARIA)	1
Austrian Music DVD (Ö3 Austria)	6
Belgian Music DVD (Ultratop Flanders)	10
Spanish Music DVD (Promusicae)	11
UK Music Videos (OCC)	2

== Certifications ==
Region	Certification	Certified units/sales
Argentina (CAPIF)	Platinum	8,000^{^}
Australia (ARIA)	4× Platinum	60,000^{^}
France (SNEP)	Gold	10,000^{*}
United Kingdom (BPI)	2× Platinum	100,000^{*}
^{*} Sales figures based on certification alone.^{^} Shipments figures based on certification alone.

== Release details ==
Country	Date	Label	Format	Catalog
United Kingdom	28 November 2005	EMI	DVD	3433519
United Kingdom	28 November 2005	EMI	UMD	3433516
Australia	9 December 2005	EMI	DVD	
Japan	21 December 2005	Toshiba/EMI	DVD	TOBW3270
Brazil	April 2007	EMI	DVD	
