= Jealousy (Sparkadia song) =

Single by Sparkadia

from the album Postcards
- Released: August 14, 2008 (UK); July 7, 2008 (AUS)
- Recorded: 2006/07
- Genre: Indie rock, Alternative rock
- Length: 4:49 (Album Version); 3:48 (Radio Version)
- Label: Ark Recordings (UK); Ivy League Records (AUS)
- Songwriter(s): Sparkadia
- Producer(s): Ben Hillier

Sparkadia singles chronology
| "Too Much to Do" (2008) | "Jealousy" (2008) | "Morning Light" (2008) |

"Jealousy" is the third single and tenth track taken from Sparkadia's debut album Postcards. The song got 'Premier Pick of the Week' which is a future prediction on the Australian Music Report site which is the official site for Australian radio. "Jealousy" was released at the time Sparkadia went on their national 'Postcards' tour around Australia and received massive amounts of airplay on mainstream stations. Jealousy also managed to score a place at #79 on Australia's Triple J Hottest 100, 2008.

== Music video ==
The music video features the band members celebrating a wedding shot on a low budget camera. In the video, lead singer Alex and guitarist Tiffany play newlyweds celebrating their marriage at a ceremony and after celebrations, Nick (bassist) plays the best man and Dave (drummer) a groomsman. Following the wedding the group head to the reception, during which Dave gets up and dances on a chair and the video shows the group dancing and celebrating. At a pivotal moment of the clip the camera zooms in on Nick and Tiffany in the background dancing alone. This is followed by a slowmo of Nick staring at Tiffany and finally Nick giving Tiffany a kiss on the cheek during the wedding. From this point on Tiffany's face is scratched out as more scenes are shown from the day. The video concludes with a picture of Nick and Alex seemingly burning away followed by a shot of Tifanny blowing a kiss from the start of the clip, but with her face slowly scratched out of view.

== Release ==
The single was never released physically, but digitally.
