= Talking Like I'm Falling Down Stairs =

Single by Sparkadia

from the album The Great Impression
- Released: September 1, 2010 (AUS)
- Recorded: 2010
- Genre: Indie rock, Alternative rock
- Length: 4:06
- Label: Ivy League Records
- Songwriter(s): Alexander Burnett
- Producer(s): Mark Tieku

Sparkadia singles chronology
"Morning Light" (2008)	"Talking Like I'm Falling Down Stairs" (2010)	"China" (2011)

"Talking Like I'm Falling Down Stairs" is the first single taken from Sparkadia's second studio album The Great Impression, released in Australia on September 1, 2010. The single received high rotation on Australian radio network Triple J and placed at #24 in their Hottest 100 of 2010.

== Chart positions ==
Australia - #59

== Music video ==
The official music video was filmed on location in a 1930s mental asylum in Auckland, New Zealand in September 2010. The video was directed by New Zealand video agency Blur And Sharpen. The building was converted into an art school in the 1990s and was subsequently purchased by the Church of Scientology.

Alexander Burnett described the grandiose and dilapidated building as evoking The Shining and The Great Gatsby.

During down time on the shoot, Alexander Burnett took several photographs with portraits of L Ron Hubbard.

== Remix ==
An official "DREAMTRAK DIAMOND" remix was created frequent Alexander Burnett and Antony & Cleopatra collaborator by Dreamtrak (Swim Deep, Foals, Cymbals) and uploaded to SoundCloud in 2011.

Burnett requested a remix from Dreamtrak which "sounded like a surreal party that defies time and space that takes place at Studio 54 and the Hacienda at the same time."
