= Too Much to Do =

Single by Sparkadia

from the album Postcards
- B-side: "The Plague"
- Released: February 14, 2008 (UK); May 31, 2008 (AUS)
- Recorded: 2006/07
- Genre: Indie rock, Alternative rock
- Length: 3:10
- Label: Ark Recordings (UK); Ivy League Records (AUS)
- Songwriter: Sparkadia
- Producer: Ben Hillier

Sparkadia singles chronology
"Animals" (2007)	"Too Much to Do" (2008)	"Jealousy" (2008)

"Too Much to Do" is the second single taken from Sparkadia's debut album, Postcards. "Too Much to Do" brought Sparkadia recognition after large amounts of airplay and the 'Too Much to Do Tour'. The single was a commercial success and in Australia and the UK. It was the first single to be released physically.

== Track listing ==
1. "Too Much to Do"
2. "The Plague"

== Chart positions ==
Australia - No. 99 (Physical Release)

== Music video ==
Music video was shot in Sydney, Australia. It was directed by Daniel Reisinger and Max Brown and choreographed by Richard James Allen. It features some trick photography with the band playing along with people moving in fast motion.
