= The Great Impression =

Studio album by Sparkadia
- Released: 18 March 2011
- Recorded: 2010
- Genre: Alternative rock
- Length: 47:32
- Label: Ivy League

Sparkadia chronology
Postcards (2008)	The Great Impression (2011)

The Great Impression is the second full-length studio album by Australian alternative rock band Sparkadia. It was released on 18 March 2011, with "Talking Like I'm Falling Down Stairs" and "China" released as singles prior to the album's release.

The album reached number 8 on the Australian charts and was the week's "feature album" on ABC's Triple J station.

== Track listing ==
The Great Impression track listing
No.	Title	Length
1.	"The Great Impression"	2:35
2.	"Fingerprints"	3:40
3.	"Talking Like I'm Falling Down Stairs"	4:06
4.	"China"	4:41
5.	"Love Less Love"	4:14
6.	"Ghost"	4:55
7.	"Shoot Straight"	3:03
8.	"Mary"	4:02
9.	"Hurt Me"	4:23
10.	"I Started Something I Couldn't Finish"	3:02
11.	"The Lost Ones"	3:12
12.	"Fade from View"	5:44

Bonus Tracks
No.	Title	Length
13.	"Still Can't Make Up My Mind"	4:05
14.	"Too Young"	4:22

== Charts ==
Chart performance for The Great Impression
Chart (2011)	Peak position
Australian Albums (ARIA)	8
