= Giving You Up =

2005 single by Kylie Minogue

Single by Kylie Minogue

from the album Ultimate Kylie
- B-side: "Made of Glass"
- Released: 28 March 2005
- Studio: Xenomania (Kent, England)
- Length: 3:34
- Label: Festival Mushroom; Parlophone
- Songwriters: Miranda Cooper; Brian Higgins; Tim Powell; Lisa Cowling; Paul Woods; Nick Coler; Kylie Minogue
- Producers: Brian Higgins; Xenomania

Kylie Minogue singles chronology
"I Believe in You" (2004)	"Giving You Up" (2005)	"2 Hearts" (2007)

Music video
- "Giving You Up" on YouTube

"Giving You Up" is a song by Australian singer Kylie Minogue, from her second major greatest hits album Ultimate Kylie (2004). The song was released as the album's second and final single on 28 March 2005. It was co-written by Minogue with Miranda Cooper, Brian Higgins, Tim Powell, Lisa Cowling, Paul Woods, and Nick Coler, while production was by Higgins and Xenomania. The track was her last solo single before she was diagnosed with breast cancer two months later; her next single was "2 Hearts" in 2007.

"Giving You Up" received mixed reviews from music critics, who complimented Minogue's vocals but dismissed the production and composition. It peaked inside the top ten in both Australia and the United Kingdom, and also charted in Austria, Belgium, Denmark, and Finland. Alex and Martin commissioned the accompanying music video for the single, which shows Minogue as a giantess and walking around the streets of London. "Giving You Up" has only been performed on her Showgirl: The Greatest Hits Tour in 2005.

== Background and composition ==
In August 2004, it was announced that Minogue would be recording new tracks, rumoured to be some kind of Christmas material. The month after, it was announced that she would be releasing a greatest hits album, titled Ultimate Kylie, containing two new tracks, being "I Believe in You" and "Giving You Up"; Jake Shears and Babydaddy were in charge of the production of the former, whilst the latter was produced by Brian Higgins and Xenomania. A separate compilation DVD with the same name, containing several music videos by the singer, was also released to coincide with the distribution of the album. In the same statement, it was announced that "I Believe in You" would be the lead single from the compilation.

"Giving You Up" was released digitally as the second single from Ultimate Kylie on 25 March 2005. Three days later, it was released physically in the United Kingdom. It was released as a limited edition vinyl single in the United Kingdom. In Australia, the CD single was released on 11 April 2005 and was limited to 25,000 copies. All formats feature the B-side "Made of Glass", which was written by Minogue and Xenomania during the recording sessions for Ultimate Kylie in 2004. It was also recorded by British recording artist Rachel Stevens but was never released.

"Giving You Up"
22-second sample of the song.

"Giving You Up" was written and recorded during mid-2004 in London, England by Minogue and Xenomania. It was the third new song recorded for the compilation; the other two were "I Believe in You" and "Loving You", with the latter being cut from the album.

== Critical reception ==
"Giving You Up" received mixed reviews from pop music critics. In a review for About.com, Jason Shawahn called the song "a sultry little throbber" and wrote that its "Minogue at her best". Chris Taylor from MusicOMH was less impressed, and wrote that the song was "not one of Kylie's most inspired singles". Pitchfork reviewer Nick Sylvester called the song "a return to big sound Fever electro, but with subtler production: all the hacksaw synth is pushed back and sanded off, so Kylie's head voice doesn't have to go through eight additional filters to compete with the bristle".

== Chart performance ==
"Giving You Up" entered at number eight on the Australian Singles Chart. It lasted seven weeks in the top fifty. It entered the Spanish Singles Chart at number seven, and peaked at six the following week. It lasted six weeks in the chart. The song entered the UK Singles Chart at number six and lasted ten weeks in the top 100. It reached number 137 in the Annual UK Singles Chart of 2005. "Giving You Up" entered and peaked at number twenty on the Irish Singles Chart. The song reached the top forty in other territories in Europe, including Finland, Belgium, Germany, Netherlands, and Switzerland. The song reached number 13 on the European Hot 100 Singles chart.

== Music video ==
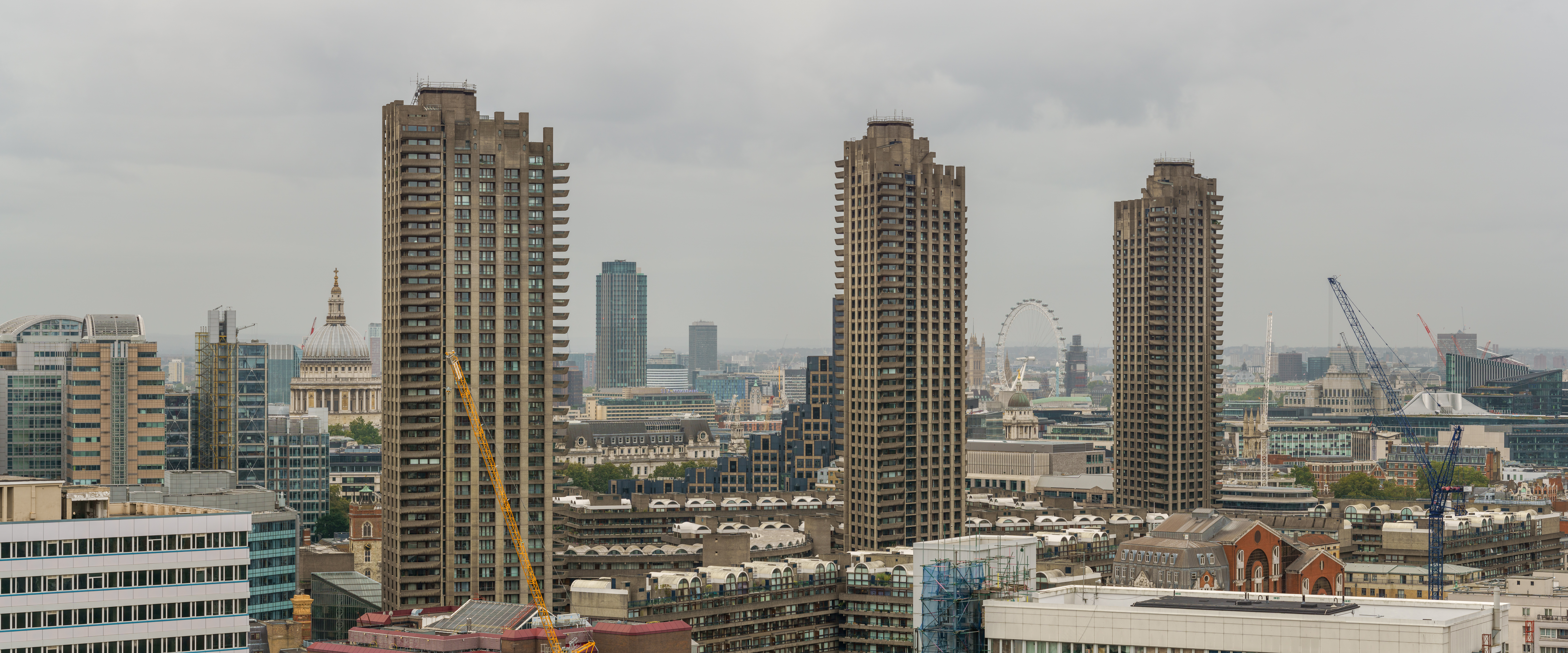
Parts of the music video for "Giving You Up" depict Minogue in the Beech Street tunnel under the Barbican Estate in London.

A music video for "Giving You Up" was directed by Alex and Martin and filmed in February 2005 in London, England. It premiered in February 2005 and was released commercially on the song's CD single. In 2006, the video was nominated for "Best International Video" at the 15th Annual MVPA Awards.

The video features Minogue as a 17-foot tall, vampy, blonde giantess roaming through the streets and clubs of London at night. There are three sequences; the first features Minogue walking through the Beech Street tunnel under the Barbican Estate, the second of her walking through the streets and the third of her in a club. Throughout the video Minogue meets several people. In a sequence on the streets, she dances in front of a taxi cab that has stopped to let her across a zebra crossing. Minogue then heads to a club where she meets a shy man who is interested in her. In another scene on the streets, Minogue walks past three men, and begins to dance and sing to them.

== Live performances ==
"Giving You Up" has only been performed on her Showgirl: The Greatest Hits Tour in 2005. The song was used at the first segment, which features her in a blue showgirl costume with a blue headdress. The performance is supported by back-up dancers wearing green showgirl and showboy costumes. Minogue was unable to complete the tour as she was diagnosed with early breast cancer and had to cancel the Australian leg of the tour. The performance of the song was included in the Showgirl video album (2005).

== Formats and track listings ==
- Australian and New Zealand CD maxi-single
1. "Giving You Up" – 3:31
2. "Made of Glass" (Kylie Minogue, Miranda Cooper, Brian Higgins, Lisa Cowling, Tim Powell, Matt Gray) – 3:12
3. "Giving You Up" (Riton Re-Rub vox) – 6:32
4. "Giving You Up" (Alter Ego dub) – 6:31
5. "Giving You Up" (video)
- UK and European CD single
1. "Giving You Up" (original) – 3:31
2. "Made of Glass" – 3:11
- UK and European CD maxi-single
1. "Giving You Up" (original) – 3:31
2. "Giving You Up" (Alter Ego dub) – 6:31
3. "Giving You Up" (Riton Re-Rub vox) – 6:32
4. "Giving You Up" (video)
- UK and European 12-inch picture disc

A1. "Giving You Up" (Riton Re-Rub dub) – 6:32
B1. "Giving You Up" (original) – 3:31
B2. "Giving You Up" (Alter Ego remix) – 6:33

- German exclusive CD maxi-single
1. "Giving You Up" (original) – 3:32
2. "Your Disco Needs You" (German Almighty radio edit) – 3:29
3. "Your Disco Needs You" (video)
- Digital EP
1. "Giving You Up" – 3:30
2. "Giving You Up" (Alter Ego mix) – 6:33
3. "Giving You Up" (Riton Re-Rub vox) – 4:12
4. "Giving You Up" (Riton Re-Rub dub) – 6:32
5. "Made of Glass" – 3:15

== Personnel ==
Personnel are lifted from the Ultimate Kylie liner notes.

- Kylie Minogue – lead vocals
- Xenomania – production
- Tim Powell – keyboards, programming, mixing
- Brian Higgins – production, keyboards, programming
- Paul Woods – keyboards, programming
- Jeremy Wheatley – mixing
- Ashley Phase – mastering

== Charts ==
=== Weekly charts ===
Weekly chart performance for "Giving You Up"
Chart (2005)	Peak position
Australia (ARIA)	8
Australian Dance (ARIA)	1
Austria (Ö3 Austria Top 40)	45
Belgium (Ultratop 50 Flanders)	25
Belgium (Ultratip Bubbling Under Wallonia)	2
Belgium Dance (Ultratop Flanders)	16
CIS Airplay (TopHit)	77
Denmark (Tracklisten)	12
Europe (Eurochart Hot 100)	13
Finland (Suomen virallinen lista)	14
Germany (GfK)	27
Greece (IFPI)	13
Hungary (Editors' Choice Top 40)	24
Hungary (Single Top 40)	6
Ireland (IRMA)	20
Italy (FIMI)	23
Netherlands (Dutch Top 40)	34
Netherlands (Single Top 100)	23
Russia Airplay (TopHit)	81
Scottish Singles Sales (Official Charts)	5
Spain (Promusicae)	6
Switzerland (Schweizer Hitparade)	40
UK Singles (Official Charts)	6
UK Hip Hop/R&B (Official Charts)	25

=== Year-end charts ===
Year-end chart performance for "Giving You Up"
Chart (2005)	Position
Romania (Romanian Top 100)	70
UK Singles (OCC)	137

== Release history ==
Release dates and formats for "Giving You Up"
Region	Date	Format(s)	Label	Ref.
Various	25 March 2005	Digital download	Parlophone	
United Kingdom	28 March 2005	12-inch vinyl; CD	Parlophone	
Australia	11 April 2005	CD	Festival Mushroom	
Germany	2 May 2005	CD	Parlophone	
