= Come into My World =

2002 single by Kylie Minogue

- Cover for CD1 and digital download

Single by Kylie Minogue

from the album Fever
- Released: 21 October 2002
- Recorded: 2001; 2002 (single version)
- Studio: Rob's, Phil's, Big & Ump
- Genre: Dance-pop
- Length: 4:06 (single version)
- Label: Festival Mushroom; Parlophone; Capitol
- Songwriters: Cathy Dennis; Rob Davis
- Producers: Cathy Dennis; Rob Davis

Kylie Minogue singles chronology
"Love at First Sight" (2002)	"Come into My World" (2002)	"Slow" (2003)

Music video
- "Come into My World" on YouTube

"Come into My World" is a song recorded by Australian singer Kylie Minogue for her eighth studio album Fever (2001). Written and produced by Cathy Dennis and Rob Davis, it is a dance-pop song in which the singer pleads to her lover to come into her "world". "Come into My World" was released as the fourth and final single from Fever on 21 October 2002.

Critical reception towards "Come into My World" was positive; the majority of the critics commended the song's composition and commercial appeal. In Australia, the single peaked at number four on the ARIA Singles Chart. It found moderate success in the United Kingdom, where it debuted and peaked at number eight on the UK Singles Chart. The single also charted within the top 20 in Belgium, Hungary, Italy, Romania, Canada and New Zealand, and peaked at number 91 on the US Billboard Hot 100.

The accompanying music video for "Come into My World", directed by Michel Gondry and produced by Partizan, features duplicated Kylies walking in Paris alongside local townspeople. The video received positive reviews, with critics praising the idea. "Come into My World" was first performed on her KylieFever2002 tour, and has featured on all her tours up until the Aphrodite: Les Folies Tour in 2011. The song was later honoured with a Grammy Award for Best Dance Recording during the 2004 ceremony, becoming Minogue's first Grammy.

== Background and composition ==
Kylie Minogue "Come into My World" (2002)
A 24-second sample of "Come into My World" containing the chorus and hook of the song. Minogue invites her lover into her "world" through the lyrics.

Following the global success of her eighth studio album Fever (2001), and the album's subsequent singles; "Can't Get You Out of My Head", "In Your Eyes", and "Love at First Sight", Minogue's label Parlophone decided to release a fourth single worldwide. Minogue enlisted several producers including Rob Davis and Cathy Dennis, both of whom worked with Minogue previously; the duo wrote and produced "Come into My World". According to Minogue's official website, "Come into My World" was a last minute addition to the album.

The maxi CD editions of the single contain remixes of the song, live recordings of "Love at First Sight", and album track "Fever". The CD single was also accompanied by a DVD single. The single version, which features additional vocals and production, has subsequently been used on both physical and digital reissues of the Fever album.

NME wrote that "Come into My World" was derivative of the song "Can't Get You Out of My Head" from the same album. According to Jason Thompson at PopMatters, the song describes Minogue's "plea for love" as Minogue invites her partner into her life.

== Artwork ==
The artwork for "Come into My World" was photographed by Nick Knight, who also photographed the single artworks for "Love at First Sight". During 2002, Minogue launched her Love Kylie lingerie collection, and enlisted Knight to photograph Minogue to promote it; out takes were later re-used for the artwork of "Love at First Sight". Knight was requested by Minogue to shoot the artwork for the "Come into My World" cover sleeve, which features Minogue holding a bouquet of flowers; different coloured lights are projecting against Minogue's skin, similar to the work of her 1997 album, Impossible Princess. The second CD features a different pose in the same set, and the DVD artwork features a close-up of the first CD. Minogue's creative collaborator, and close friend, William Baker, commented about the photo shoot; "Kylie possesses that indefinable star quality and charisma that is so often lacking in many of her contemporaries." A high-quality out-take of the single was included into Minogue's 2012 coffee table book, Kylie / Fashion.

== Critical reception ==
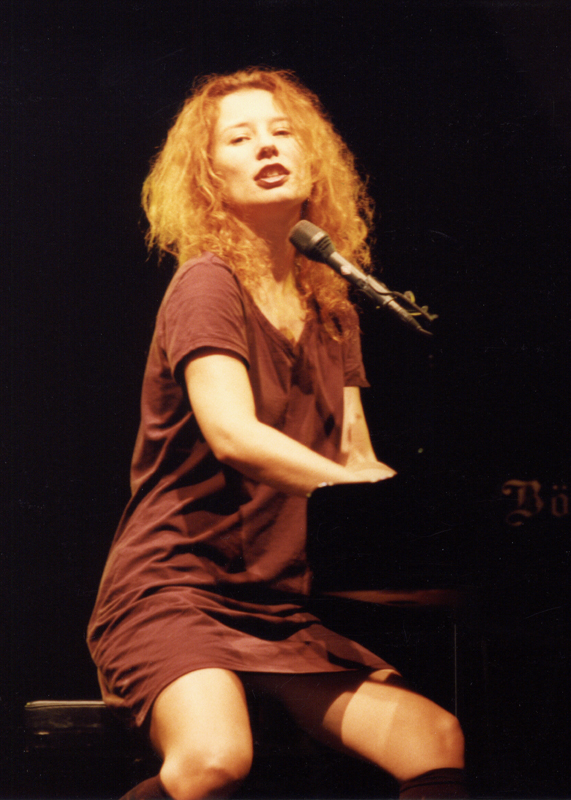
The orchestral arrangement of "Come into My World" was compared to the work of American artist Tori Amos.

Chris True from AllMusic highlighted "Come into My World" as an album stand out from Fever, and a career stand out track. Jon O'Brien from the same publication reviewed Minogue's 2011 box set, The Albums 2000–2010 compilation that featured "Come into My World", and discussed the Fever period by saying "Full of Gaelic guitar licks, filtered house synths, and slinky electro beats, 2001 follow-up Fever has aged much better, but while the superbly hypnotic "Can't Get You Out of My Head" is inarguably her career's best single, the album is far from a one-trick-pony, with the euphoric Stardust-inspired "Love at First Sight," and the chilled-out dream pop of "Come into My World" also highlighting just how deadly a weapon Minogue's seductive purr is." Scott Harrah from Stagezine commended the singles from Fever and their commercial appeal, stating that the first four singles (including "Come into My World") "were irresistible dance-pop that made America fall in love with Kylie all over again."

Minogue re-recorded "Come into My World" in an orchestral arrangement for her 2012 compilation, The Abbey Road Sessions; this version received favourable reviews from music critics. Annie Zaleski from The A.V. Club said "Come into My World" sounds like early Tori Amos, courtesy of a coquettish delivery and classical-inspired piano..." Marc Hirsh from The Boston Globe said "On the other hand, the original was shiver-inducing straight through, and 'dediscofying' such mighty (overseas) hits as 'I Believe in You' and 'Come into My World' into cocktail folk or Shirley Bassey nightclub soul turns them into trifles. It turns out, those songs really want to dance." A reviewer from samesame.com.au said "As great as the original was, it's listening to the version here, much like hearing all of the songs included on The Abbey Road Sessions, that makes you realise what is perhaps the single greatest achievement of this project – namely, that it has given Minogue what she's needed all along in order to prove her detractors wrong: the space in which to relax, to breathe, and to simply sing."

=== Accolades ===
At the 2003 ARIA Music Awards, "Come into My World" was nominated for Best Pop Release, and represented Minogue for the Best Female Artist award; she lost both awards to Delta Goodrem's debut album Innocent Eyes as well as her single Born to Try released in 2002, respectively. That same year, Minogue won the Best Music Video for "Come into My World" at the UK CADS Awards. In 2004, "Come into My World" was nominated for a Grammy Award for Best Dance Recording; this was Minogue's second consecutive nomination, previously nominated for "Love at First Sight" in 2003 in the same category, and went on to be nominated two more times in 2005 for "Slow", and 2006 for "I Believe in You". Minogue went on to win the award that night; it marked the first time an Australian music artist had won an award in a major category at the American award show since Australian rock band Men at Work won the award for "Best New Artist" in 1982, and the eighth Australian to win a Grammy. The song was Minogue's only Grammy award-winning song, until "Padam Padam" won the inaugural Grammy for Best Pop Dance Recording in 2024. Minogue did not attend the opening for the Grammy Awards in Los Angeles, California on 8 February 2004, but accepted the award at the backstage press room conference; she attended the Grammy Awards opening a year prior at the same location, her only appearance there. Minogue said of the award; "To actually be a recipient is incredibly special, I am thrilled and cannot wait to bring it home."

== Chart performance ==
"Come into My World" debuted at number eight on the UK Singles Chart, her lowest charting single from Fever, but lasted ten weeks inside the top 100. In Australia, "Come into My World" entered the top ten by debuting at number four on the Australian Singles Chart, staying in the charts for nine weeks. The song was certified gold by the Australian Recording Industry Association (ARIA) for shipments of 35,000 units. In New Zealand, the song debuted at number thirty-four on the charts, then rose to number twenty, lasting for eleven weeks in the chart. In the United States, "Come into My World" reached ninety-one on the US Billboard Hot 100 chart, her lowest charting single in that country until it was tied with her 2003 single, "Slow". The song reached twenty and twenty-eight on the US Dance Club Songs and the Mainstream Top 40, respectively. As of March 2011, "Come into My World" is Minogue's fifth highest selling single in the United States, and her third highest selling single from the Fever period, selling 56,000 units.

== Music video ==
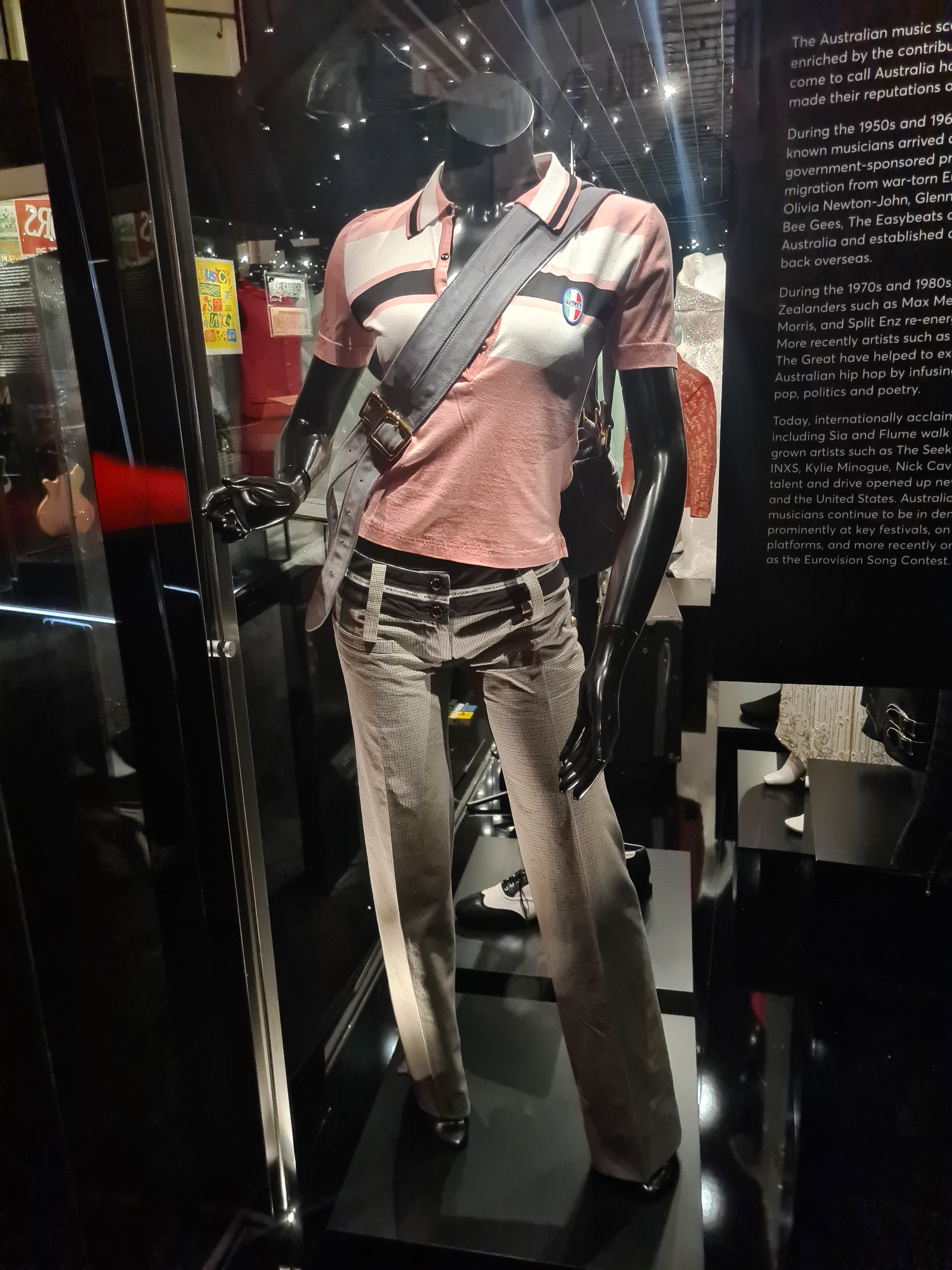
The clothes worn by Minogue in the video for "Come into My World", Australian Music Vault, Melbourne

The video was directed by French director Michel Gondry and updated a concept he had already used for Neneh Cherry's "Feel It" music video. The video was shot in one on 8 September 2002 at the intersection of Rue du Point du Jour and Rue de Solférino, within the Boulogne-Billancourt suburb of Paris. Fifty extras were on hand, including Russian actor Sacha Bourdo. The video, which took fifteen days to design and digitally master, features Minogue strolling around the intersection. Every time she completes a full circle, a duplicate of her appears from the Dry Cleaners, and by the end of the video there are four distinct Minogue duplicates amidst an extremely chaotic scene with each background extra also depicted four times. The video ends with a fifth Minogue emerging as the start of a further iteration is glimpsed while the picture fades out.

A reviewer from Slant Magazine placed the video for "Come into My World" at the top of their Best of the Aughts: Music Videos list. The reviewer compared the video to Zbigniew Rybczyński's short animated film, Tango. Pitchfork Media placed it at number 14 on their The Top 50 Music Videos of the 2000s list.

Scott Plagenhoef said of the video: "Arguably the most re-watchable video of the decade, Michel Gondry pulls out the 'Star Guitar' multiplication trick and applies it to Kylie and the streets of Paris." Complex placed it at number 79 on their list "Top 100 Music Videos of the 2000s". Rolling Stone magazine placed the song at number 59 on their list of the "100 Greatest Music Videos" in July 2021.

== Live performances ==
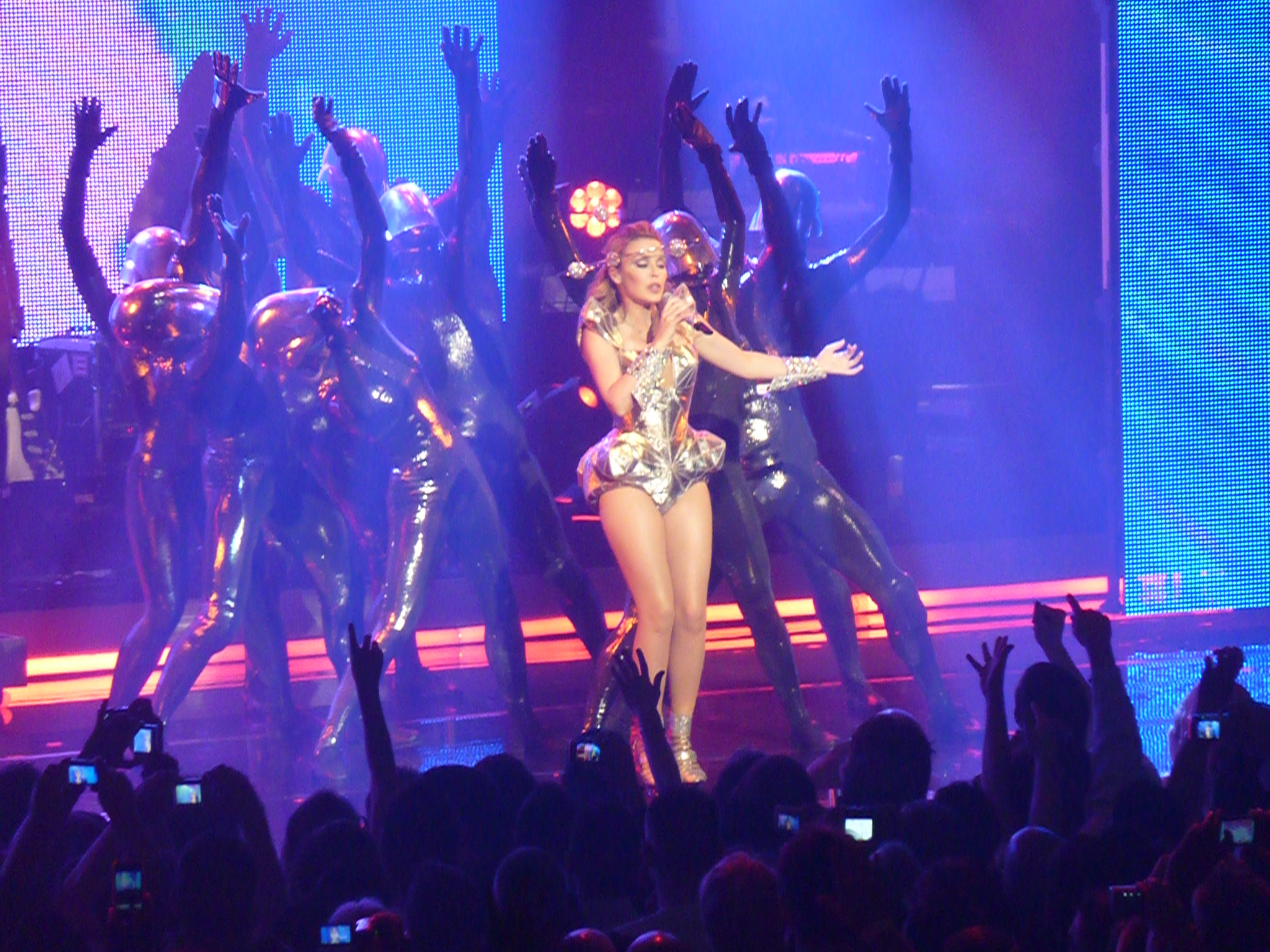
Minogue performing the song during her For You, For Me Tour, 2009

The song was included in the introduction segment of the KylieFever2002 tour, which was launched to promote Fever. "Come into My World" was included on the set list of Minogue's Showgirl: The Greatest Hits Tour in 2005. Minogue was unable to complete the tour as she was diagnosed with early breast cancer and had to cancel the Australian leg of the tour. After undergoing treatment and recovery, she resumed the concert tour in the form of Showgirl: The Homecoming Tour in 2007, and "Come into My World" was again added to the set list. In 2008, she performed the song on the KylieX2008 tour, which was launched to promote her tenth studio album X. The show was split into eight acts and "Come into My World" was featured on the fifth act entitled "Naughty Manga Girl", in a Fisherspooner remix version. In 2009, she performed a new version of the song on the For You, For Me tour, which was her first concert tour in North America, for the "Xlectro Static" act. Minogue performed an a cappella version for her 2011 Aphrodite World Tour on selected dates, by fan requests. Minogue had included the song on her Kylie Summer 2015, where she performed "Come into My World" at Newmarket, England, and Merseyside, England. In 2020, Kylie performed an acoustic snippet of the song in the encore of the São Paulo date of the Summer 2019 tour, after fans requested it during the concert.

== Other appearances and usage ==
"Come into My World" has been included on several compilation albums released by Minogue. The song's first inclusion was Minogue's 2004 compilation, Ultimate Kylie, which appeared on the second disc. The Fisherspooner remix appeared on Minogue's tenth remix album, Boombox (2008). The orchestral version was released on Minogue's thirteenth greatest hits, and first orchestral compilation, The Abbey Road Sessions. The song also appears on Minogue's 2011 box set compilation, The Albums 2000–2010, which served on the Fever disc while its most recent appearance is on the 2019 greatest hits album Step Back in Time: The Definitive Collection. The music video for "Come into My World" has been included once on Minogue's 2004 video compilation, Ultimate Kylie. The live versions for her Fever Tour, Showgirl: Homecoming Tour and For You, For Me Tour appears on their respective live releases. On 16 February 2018, Australian singer Betty Who released a cover of the song for Made in Australia compilation by Amazon Music.

In March 2026, the music video for "Come into My World" was recreated in a commercial directed by Gondry and produced by Partizan for Chanel, featuring actress Margot Robbie and Minogue herself.

== Track listings ==
Australian and European CD maxi-single 1

1. "Come into My World" (radio edit) – 4:06
2. "Come into My World" (Ashtrax mix) – 5:02
3. "Come into My World" (Robbie Rivera's Hard & Sexy mix) – 7:01
4. "Come into My World" (video)

Australian and European CD maxi-single 2

1. "Come into My World" (radio edit) – 4:06
2. "Love at First Sight" (live at Manchester) – 4:19
3. "Fever" (live at Manchester) – 3:43

Australian and European DVD single

1. "Come into My World" (live at Manchester video) – 7:22
2. "Come into My World" (Fischerspooner mix audio) – 4:17
3. Documentary Footage (video excerpt) – 1:56

Benelux and Canadian 2-track CD single

1. "Come into My World" (radio edit) – 4:06
2. "Come into My World" (Fischerspooner mix) – 4:17

French exclusive CD maxi-single

1. "Come into My World" (radio edit) – 4:06
2. "Come into My World" (Fischerspooner mix) – 4:17
3. "Come into My World" (Joachim Garraud radio edit) – 3:51

US 12-inch single

A1. "Come into My World" (Robbie Rivera's Hard & Sexy mix) – 7:01
A2. "Come into My World" (radio edit) – 4:06
B1. "Come into My World" (Fischerspooner mix) – 4:17
B2. "Come into My World" (Ashtrax mix) – 5:00

Digital download

1. "Come into My World" (Joachim Garraud radio edit) – 3:51
2. "Come into My World" (Live in Manchester) – 6:12
3. "Come into My World" (radio edit) – 4:06
4. "Come into My World" (Robbie Rivera's NYC dub) – 9:15

== Credits and personnel ==
Credits are adapted from the liner notes of "Come into My World".

- Kylie Minogue – vocals, backing vocals
- Rob Davis – songwriting, production, piano, keyboards, bass and drum programming
- Cathy Dennis – songwriting, production
- Nick Knight – photographer

== Charts ==
=== Weekly charts ===
2002–2003 weekly chart performance for "Come into My World"
Chart	Peak position
Australia (ARIA)	4
Australian Dance (ARIA)	2
Austria (Ö3 Austria Top 40)	59
Belgium (Ultratop 50 Flanders)	35
Belgium (Ultratip Bubbling Under Wallonia)	2
Canada (Nielsen SoundScan)	15
Canada CHR/Top 40 (Nielsen BDS)	26
Denmark (Tracklisten)	15
Eurochart Hot 100 (Music & Media)	20
France (SNEP)	78
Germany (GfK)	47
Hungary (Rádiós Top 40)	10
Ireland (IRMA)	11
Italy (FIMI)	13
Netherlands (Dutch Top 40)	24
Netherlands (Single Top 100)	35
New Zealand (Recorded Music NZ)	20
Quebec (ADISQ)	36
Romania (Romanian Top 100)	12
Scottish Singles Sales (Official Charts)	9
Spain (Promusicae)	15
Switzerland (Schweizer Hitparade)	66
UK Singles (Official Charts)	8
US Billboard Hot 100	91
US Dance Singles Sales (Billboard)	20
US Pop Airplay (Billboard)	28

=== Year-end charts ===
2002 year-end chart performance for "Come into My World"
Chart	Position
Canada (Nielsen SoundScan)	80
UK Airplay (Music Week)	72

2003 year-end chart performance for "Come into My World"
Chart	Position
Colombia (B&V)	6
Romania (Romanian Top 100)	42

== Certifications ==
Certifications and sales for "Come into My World"
Region	Certification	Certified units/sales
Australia (ARIA)	Gold	35,000^{^}
United States	—	56,000
^{^} Shipments figures based on certification alone.

== Release history ==
Release dates and formats for "Come into My World"
Region	Date	Format(s)	Label(s)	Ref.
United States	21 October 2002	Contemporary hit radio; rhythmic contemporary radio	Capitol	
United States	22 October 2002	12-inch vinyl	Capitol	
Australia	4 November 2002	DVD; maxi CD (Note: "Come into My World" was made available in two maxi CD variants, with one including remixes alongside the original version and the song's music video, and the other including two B-sides.)	Festival Mushroom	
Germany	11 November 2002	DVD; maxi CD	EMI	
United Kingdom	11 November 2002	Maxi CD	Parlophone	
France	12 November 2002	Maxi CD	Capitol	
France	28 January 2003	CD	Capitol	
