= Turbo Fruits =

American band

- Origin: Nashville, Tennessee, United States
- Genres: Alternative rock, Garage rock
- Years active: 2006–2016
- Labels: Ecstatic Peace, Ark Recordings, Fat Possum, Serpents & Snakes, Thirty Tigers/Melvin Records
- Members: Jonas Stein
- Past members: John Eatherly; Max Peebles; Zack Martin; Wes Taylor; Kingsley Brock; Dave McCowen; Matt Hearn
- Website: turbofruits.com

Turbo Fruits was a garage rock band, formed in 2006 by Jonas Stein in Nashville, Tennessee. The band released four studio albums and a string of singles, with Stein being the only constant member before the band split up in 2016.

== Biography ==
The band was formed by Be Your Own Pet guitarist/vocalist Jonas Stein. Turbo Fruits formed while Stein was still in Be Your Own Pet. The earliest version of Turbo Fruits also included Be Your Own Pet drummer John Eatherly who performed on the self-titled debut, which was released in the U.S. via Thurston Moore's Ecstatic Peace! label and then a few months later in the United Kingdom by ARK Recordings. The duo later added bassist Max Peebles for touring. Stein continued the band after Be Your Own Pet folded in 2008 and again after Eatherly and Peebles left the band to join Be Your Own Pet's frontwoman Jemina Pearl in her solo project. Stein then added bassist Wes Traylor and drummer Zack Martin for Turbo Fruits' second album, Echo Kid, which was released in fall 2009 on Fat Possum. That fall, the band (Stein, Eatherly & Peebles) also appeared in Drew Barrymore's directorial debut Whip It. Just before Echo Kid was released, Taylor and Martin left the band to start Nashville based rock band Natural Child and Matt Hearn and Dave McCowen of Nashville's The Tits were recruited for touring. In the summer of 2010 Kingsley Brock was added on guitar making the band a 4-piece for the first time.

On April 20, 2015 Turbo Fruits released No Control on Thirty Tigers / Melvin Records. No Control was produced by Jeremy Ferguson from Battle Tapes Recording, and Patrick Carney of The Black Keys.

In September 2016, it was announced that the band had officially split up earlier that year. Stein released his first solo effort Chillsesh as the soundtrack to a video diary.

== Band members ==
Current members

- Jonas Stein – Lead Guitar, Lead Vocals (2006–present)

Former members

- John Eatherly – Drums (2006–2008)
- Max Peebles – Bass, Backing Vocals (2008)
- Zack Martin – Drums (2009)
- Wes Taylor – Bass, Backing Vocals (2009)
- Matt Hearn – Drums (2009–2016)
- Dave McCowen – Bass, Backing Vocals (2009–2015)
- Kingsley Brock – Rhythm Guitar, Backing Vocals (2010–2015)

=== Appearances ===
- Reading and Leeds Festival (2006)
- SXSW (2007 - 2011)
- CMJ Music Marathon (2008 - 2011)
- Whip It (film) (2009)
- Sled Island Festival (2010)

=== Support tours & shows ===
- Jay Reatard
- Black Lips
- Surfer Blood
- Dinosaur Jr.
- Built To Spill
- Band of Skulls
- Monotonix
- Deer Tick
- Hard Working Americans

== Discography ==
=== Studio albums ===
- Turbo Fruits - July 17, 2007 (Ecstatic Peace) / August 6, 2007 (Ark Recordings)
- Echo Kid - September 29, 2009 (Fat Possum Records) / November 23, 2009 (Ark Recordings)
- Butter - September 11, 2012 (Serpents & Snakes Records)
- No Control - April 20, 2015 (Thirty Tigers Records) (Melvin Records)

=== Singles ===
- Mama's Mad Cos I Fried My Brain 7" - September 29, 2009 (Fat Possum Records)
- Colt 45 7" - February 20, 2010 (CASS Records)
- Get Up Get On Down (Digital EP) - June 14, 2010 (Ark Recordings)
- Where the Stars Don't Shine 7" - October 12, 2010 (Turbo Time Records)
- Keepin' On 7" - December 14, 2010 (Turbo Time Records)
- Sweet Thang 7" - March 7, 2012 (Turbo Time Records)
- Harley Dollar Bill$7'' - July 17, 2012 (Turbo Time Records)
- Pick Up The Scraps (Digital EP)'' - March 11, 2014 (Turbo Time Records)

=== Splits ===
- Christmas (Baby Please Come Home) / Split 7" with PUJOL - October 12, 2010 (Turbo Time Records)
- Ain't the Only One Havin' Fun / Split 7" with Quintron & Miss Pussycat - February 25, 2011 (Bruise Cruise Records)
- Dreams For Sale / Split 7" with Jacuzzi Boys - December 2, 2011 (Turbo Time Records)
- Love Tennessee / Split 7" with Bad Cop - July 31, 2012 (Jeffery Drag Records)
