= Ultimate Kylie =

2004 album by Kylie Minogue

Greatest hits album by Kylie Minogue
- Released: 22 November 2004
- Recorded: 1987–2004
- Genres: Pop; dance-pop; disco
- Length: 121:01
- Labels: Parlophone; Festival Mushroom
- Producers: Stock Aitken Waterman; Brothers in Rhythm; Mike Spencer; Jake Shears; Babydaddy; Sunny Roads; Johnny Douglas; Ian Curnow; Phil Harding; Julian Gallagher; Richard Stannard; Cathy Dennis; Rob Davis; Brian Higgins; Karen Poole; Guy Chambers; Jimmy Harry; James Dean Bradfield; Dave Erigna; Dave Ball; Ingo Vauk; Lorenzo Al Dino Pizzileo; Sergio Flores; Graham Stack; Mark Taylor

Kylie Minogue chronology
Artist Collection (2004)	Ultimate Kylie (2004)	Showgirl (2005)

Singles from Ultimate Kylie
- 1. "I Believe in You" Released: 6 December 2004; 2. "Giving You Up" Released: 28 March 2005

Ultimate Kylie is the second major greatest hits album by Australian singer Kylie Minogue, and her first greatest hits released under her contract with Parlophone, her record company between 1999 and 2015. The compilation was released in many different formats including a two-disc edition and a deluxe double disc with a bonus DVD. A separate compilation DVD with the same name, was released to accompany the audio versions. The album includes two new tracks; its lead single, "I Believe in You", and the second single, "Giving You Up". A third track, "Made of Glass", was recorded for the album but not used; it was included on the physical releases of "Giving You Up".

Ultimate Kylie was commended by contemporary critics who noted the musical and credible progression from the start of her career; some critics criticised the earlier material. The album reached the top ten in the United Kingdom, Australia, Ireland, Greece, and Germany, while it charted in several other territories including Spain, Sweden, and New Zealand. The album was certified platinum by the International Federation of the Phonographic Industry (IFPI) for one million shipments throughout Europe. "I Believe in You" debuted inside the top ten in several countries worldwide, while "Giving You Up" charted moderately in some regions. The compilation was promoted through the Showgirl: The Greatest Hits Tour in 2005. After Minogue was diagnosed with breast cancer, she cancelled the tour and was resumed with another leg in 2006.

This compilation was superseded by 2019's Step Back in Time: The Definitive Collection with only "Giving You Up" not being included on the expanded, 3-CD version of the latter.

== Background ==
Ultimate Kylie is Minogue's ninth greatest hits album, and her first compilation through Parlophone. The release follows her eight previous greatest hits albums, The Kylie Collection (1988), Greatest Hits (1992), Hits+ (2000), Confide in Me (2001), Greatest Hits 87–97 and its re-release (2002 and 03), Greatest Hits: 87–99 (2003), and Artist Collection (2004). Greatest Hits and Hits+ are her only compilations released through her signed labels; Greatest Hits was released through her 1987–1992 record label, PWL, and Hits+ was released through her 1993–1998 record label, Deconstruction Records. Ultimate Kylie is her first greatest hits album under her contract with Parlophone; her final greatest hits release through the contract was The Albums 2000–2010 (2011). On Minogue's website, she shared her thoughts on the release:

Since my first hit, I can’t believe how quickly time has passed. This collection is very dear to me and holds a lifetime of memories. There is nothing like time to give you a sense of perspective and I hope the listener gets as much enjoyment out of these tracks as I do. I feel lucky to have had the opportunity to experiment throughout the years and that my fans have embraced the need in me to try new approaches. I am just as excited about the new tracks featured here as I am about all the others on the record. At this point in my career, I am happy to celebrate the past and look forward to the future.

On 22 November 2004, Ultimate Kylie was released as a standard two-disc set. Three versions were issued; the standard two-disc set, and a digital release through Amazon.com and iTunes Store; as of May 2011, the digital release has been removed from digital stores. The third format was a triple-disc package, with the original two-discs and a bonus DVD, including music video content; this was released in Australia through HMV stores in 2006. A DVD with the same name was simultaneously released which included several music videos of Minogue that have never appeared on a DVD before. It includes the completed video of the single "I Believe in You", but no video of "Giving You Up" was produced at the album and DVD's release. The DVD contains all the music videos with of the songs with on-screen lyrics (with the exception of "Giving You Up", which had not been filmed at the time of release). It also contains Minogue's performance at the 2002 BRIT Awards of "Can't Get Blue Monday Out of My Head" – a mix of her song "Can't Get You Out of My Head" and New Order's "Blue Monday". Early versions of the UK DVD were known to suffer from disc rot after a short period of time, where the playing surface becomes cloudy or forms a 'cracked' pattern. The record label offered free replacements to those who returned their damaged copies. "Can't Get You Out of My Head" is also featured in edited form with the first chorus removed. "Giving You Up" had not been filmed yet and is represented in the instrumental intro on the menu page.

On 28 October 2006, upon resuming her Showgirl tour, the compilation was re-issued as the "Showgirl Homecoming Special Edition" and included the two-disc compilation plus the corresponding DVD in a three-disc set.

== Critical response ==
Professional ratings
Review scores
Source	Rating
AllMusic	4.5/5 stars
About.com	4/5 stars
Billboard	positive
Blender	3/5 stars
MusicOMH	positive
PopMatters	8/10
Stylus	C
Yahoo! Music	8/10

Ultimate Kylie received a generally positive response from music critics. PopMatters gave it a positive review, saying: "Ultimate Kylie, which seems condensed even at its double-disc length, is one of the best collections of dance music available, even while including her '80s pop hits. It is enough to get her MP3s permanently out of my "guilty pleasures" bin" and gave the album an 8 out of 10 rating, which means that the album was of excellent status and "among the best work of the given artist, or among the best in the given genre". Stephen Thomas Erlewine from AllMusic gave it a very positive review, awarding it four and a half out of five stars. At first he said "There certainly hasn't been a shortage of Kylie Minogue hits compilations", but finished the album with a positive review and ending saying "it nevertheless gives all the hits, both big and small, in one place, which means that this not only makes this ideal for fans for all levels of dedication, it means that Ultimate Kylie lives up to its billing." Music Week staff noted that "this is a "greatest hits" truly deserving of the name, and offers more hits than you can shake a stick at".

Jason Shawahn from About.com gave it a positive review, awarding it four stars out of five. He praised the album for its inclusion of two new songs, which he feels were "among the finest tracks that Kylie has recorded in years" and show her at her best. He later finished saying "but as far as providing the comprehensive Kylie, the folks at EMI have done a pretty good job." In a review for Stylus Magazine, Mark Edwards called the first disc "horribly naff" and full of "squeaky songs". The review also mentioned "every year or two she’ll release another pop gem, sell a squillion more calendars and finally retire as a multi-millionairess with a greatest hits compilation in every household. Because everyone loves Kylie, even if half of this album is terrible." Jaime Gill from Yahoo! Music gave it a positive review, saying "But why not accept it as merely the brand for a shiny double CD of brilliant pop tunes? If she disappeared tomorrow few would really care, but if songs like this did we really, really would." In 2007, The Guardian included the album in their "1000 Albums You Must Hear Before You Die" list. In 2006, "I Believe in You" was nominated for a Grammy Award in the Best Dance Recording category at the 48th Grammy Awards.

== Chart performance ==
In the United Kingdom, Ultimate Kylie debuted at number four, staying in for thirty-one weeks. The album was certified triple platinum by the British Phonographic Industry (BPI) for shipments of 900,000 units. The album entered at number five on the Australian Albums Chart, and stayed in the top fifty for forty-two weeks, Minogue's longest charting greatest hits album. Ultimate Kylie was certified quadruple platinum by the Australian Recording Industry Association (ARIA), selling over 280,000 copies in the country. In New Zealand, the album entered at thirty-nine on the New Zealand Albums Chart, and reached thirty-three.

Ultimate Kylie had other success in other countries as well. The album managed to peak at number fourteen and thirty-five in Belgium (Flanders) and Belgium (Wallonia), being certificated Platinum there. The album debuted at number forty-nine in Spain, and it eventually peaked at number thirty-four after fifteen weeks in the charts. The album was certificated Gold in the country, selling over 50,000 copies. The album also peaked at number eight on the Irish Albums Chart, and was certificated Platinum by the Irish Recording Music Association (IRMA).

== Promotion ==
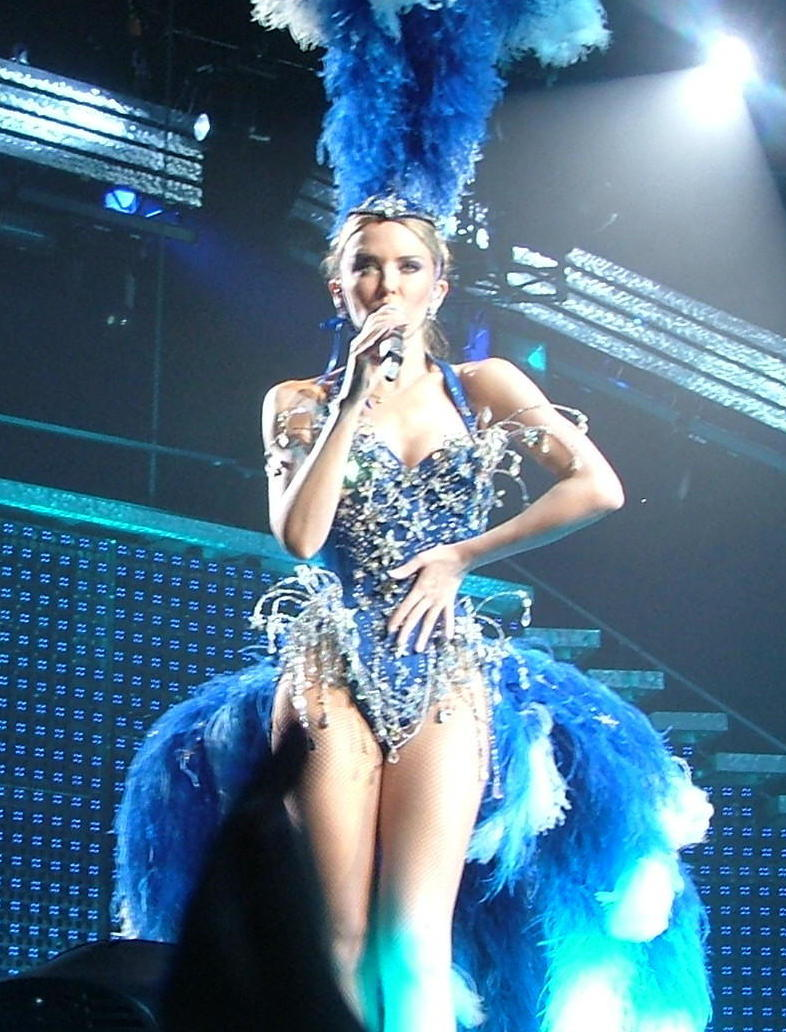
Minogue performing during Showgirl: The Greatest Hits Tour (2005)

In order to promote Ultimate Kylie and the single, Minogue performed "I Believe in You" in shows such as Top of the Pops, Nordic Music Awards, Top of the Pops Saturday, Premios Ondas, Star Academy, Hit Machine, Today with Des and Mel, and Wetten, dass..?. On 24 October 2004, it was announced that Minogue also would go on tour to promote the compilation. It commenced on 19 March 2005 and ended on 7 May 2005, visiting 14 cities in 11 European countries, totalling 37 concerts. The show was split into six acts and an encore: Showgirl; Smiley Kylie; Denial; What Kylie Wants, Kylie Gets; Dreams; Kyliesque and Minx in Space. After performing in Europe, she travelled to Melbourne, where she was diagnosed with breast cancer and was forced to cancel the tour; she intended to extend the tour to Asia and Australia. Two recordings from the tour were released; the first was a video album titled Kylie Showgirl, and released in November 2005, whilst the second one was released in December as an extended play with eight tracks from the tour, titled Showgirl.

In November 2005, her tour promoter announced the tour's restart for the end of the following year, with an update from the original version "as a thank you for the patience and understanding of Australian ticket holders". She resumed the tour, entitled Showgirl: Homecoming Tour, in November 2006 with a performance in Sydney. Her dance routines had been reworked to accommodate her medical condition, and slower costume changes and longer breaks were introduced between sections of the show to conserve her strength. The media reported that Minogue performed energetically, with the Sydney Morning Herald describing the show as an "extravaganza" and "nothing less than a triumph". The tour was released as a live album, titled Showgirl: Homecoming Live, in January 2007. The Greatest Hits Tour grossed more than US$19.97 million from 23 shows in the United Kingdom alone, and the Homecoming Tour grossed $40.11 million($62.28 million in 2025 dollars).

=== Singles ===
"I Believe in You" was released as the lead single from the compilation. Premiered on radio stations on 14 October 2004, it was released in the United Kingdom on 6 December 2004. "I Believe in You" reached the number two position in the region, only behind "Do They Know It's Christmas?" by Band Aid. It also peaked within the top ten in Australia, Austria, Denmark, Italy and Ireland, also becoming her best entry on Billboard's Hot Dance Club Songs chart, after "Slow".

It was announced that "Giving You Up" would be released as the second and last single from the compilation. It was released as a single on 28 March 2005 in the United Kingdom. It peaked at number six on the singles charts, giving Minogue her 30th top ten hit. It also reached the top ten in Australia, Scotland and Spain, and the top twenty in Denmark, Finland and Ireland.

== Track listing ==
Disc one
No.	Title	Writer(s)	Producer(s)	Length
1.	"Better the Devil You Know" (from Rhythm of Love, 1990)	Mike Stock; Matt Aitken; Pete Waterman	Stock Aitken Waterman	3:53
2.	"The Loco-Motion" (7" mix; from Kylie, 1988)	Gerry Goffin; Carole King	Stock Aitken Waterman	3:14
3.	"I Should Be So Lucky" (from Kylie)	Stock; Aitken; Waterman	Stock Aitken Waterman	3:24
4.	"Step Back in Time" (from Rhythm of Love)	Stock; Aitken; Waterman	Stock Aitken Waterman	3:04
5.	"Shocked" (DNA 7" mix featuring Jazzi P; from Rhythm of Love, 1990)	Stock; Aitken; Waterman; Pauline Bennett	Stock Aitken Waterman; DNA	3:09
6.	"What Do I Have to Do" (7" mix; from Rhythm of Love)	Stock; Aitken; Waterman	Stock Aitken Waterman	3:33
7.	"Wouldn't Change a Thing" (from Enjoy Yourself, 1989)	Stock; Aitken; Waterman	Stock Aitken Waterman	3:14
8.	"Hand on Your Heart" (from Enjoy Yourself)	Stock; Aitken; Waterman	Stock Aitken Waterman	3:51
9.	"Especially for You" (with Jason Donovan; from Ten Good Reasons, 1989)	Stock; Aitken; Waterman	Stock Aitken Waterman	3:56
10.	"Got to Be Certain" (from Kylie)	Stock; Aitken; Waterman	Stock Aitken Waterman	3:19
11.	"Je Ne Sais Pas Pourquoi" (from Kylie)	Stock; Aitken; Waterman	Stock Aitken Waterman	4:01
12.	"Give Me Just a Little More Time" (from Let's Get to It, 1991)	Edyth Wayne; Ronald Dunbar	Stock; Waterman	3:06
13.	"Never Too Late" (from Enjoy Yourself)	Stock; Aitken; Waterman	Stock Aitken Waterman	3:21
14.	"Tears on My Pillow" (from Enjoy Yourself)	Sylvester Bradford; Al Lewis	Stock Aitken Waterman	2:29
15.	"Celebration" (from Greatest Hits, 1992)	Robert Bell; James Taylor	Phil Harding; Ian Curnow	3:57
Total length:				51:35

Disc two
No.	Title	Writer(s)	Producer(s)	Length
1.	"I Believe in You"	Kylie Minogue; Jake Shears; Babydaddy	Shears; Babydaddy	3:21
2.	"Can't Get You Out of My Head" (from Fever, 2001)	Cathy Dennis; Rob Davis	Dennis; Davis	3:49
3.	"Love at First Sight" (from Fever)	Minogue; Richard Stannard; Julian Gallagher; Ash Howes; Martin Harrington	Stannard; Gallagher	3:57
4.	"Slow" (from Body Language, 2003)	Minogue; Dan Carey; Emilíana Torrini	Sunnyroads	3:13
5.	"On a Night Like This" (from Light Years, 2000)	Steve Torch; Graham Stack; Mark Taylor; Brian Rawling	Stack; Taylor	3:33
6.	"Spinning Around" (from Light Years)	Ira Shickman; Osborne Bingham; Kara DioGuardi; Paula Abdul	Mike Spencer	3:27
7.	"Kids" (radio edit; with Robbie Williams; from Light Years)	Williams; Guy Chambers	Chambers; Steve Power	4:20
8.	"Confide in Me" (radio edit; from Kylie Minogue, 1994)	Steve Anderson; Dave Seaman; Owain Barton	Brothers in Rhythm	4:26
9.	"In Your Eyes" (from Fever)	Minogue; Stannard; Gallagher; Howes	Stannard; Gallagher	3:18
10.	"Please Stay" (from Light Years)	Minogue; Stannard; Gallagher; John Themis	Stannard; Gallagher	4:04
11.	"Red Blooded Woman" (from Body Language)	Johnny Douglas; Karen Poole	Douglas; Poole	4:20
12.	"Giving You Up"	Miranda Cooper; Brian Higgins; Tim Powell; Lisa Cowling; Paul Woods; Nick Coler; Minogue	Higgins; Xenomania	3:30
13.	"Chocolate" (radio edit; from Body Language)	Douglas; Poole	Douglas; Poole	4:01
14.	"Come into My World" (single version; from Fever)	Dennis; Davis	Dennis; Davis	4:06
15.	"Put Yourself in My Place" (radio edit; from Kylie Minogue)	Jimmy Harry	Harry	4:11
16.	"Did It Again" (single version; from Impossible Princess, 1997)	Minogue; Anderson; Seaman	Brothers in Rhythm	4:14
17.	"Breathe" (radio edit; from Impossible Princess)	Minogue; Dave Ball; Ingo Vauk	Ball; Vauk	3:40
18.	"Where the Wild Roses Grow" (with Nick Cave; from Murder Ballads, 1996)	Cave	Tony Cohen; Victor Van Vugt	3:57
Total length:				69:26

Digital edition (bonus track)
No.	Title	Writer(s)	Length
19.	"Dancing Queen" (music video; from Intimate and Live, 1998)	Benny Andersson; Björn Ulvaeus; Stig Anderson	3:45
Total length:			73:11

Japanese edition (Disc one)
No.	Title	Length
1.	"Better the Devil You Know" (from Rhythm of Love)	3:53
2.	"The Loco-Motion" (7" mix; from Kylie)	3:14
3.	"I Should Be So Lucky" (from Kylie)	3:24
4.	"Turn It into Love" (from Kylie)	3:36
5.	"Step Back in Time" (from Rhythm of Love)	3:04
6.	"Shocked" (DNA 7" mix featuring Jazzi P; from Rhythm of Love)	3:09
7.	"What Do I Have to Do" (7" mix; from Rhythm of Love)	3:33
8.	"Wouldn't Change a Thing" (from Enjoy Yourself)	3:14
9.	"Hand on Your Heart" (from Enjoy Yourself)	3:51
10.	"Especially for You" (with Jason Donovan; from Ten Good Reasons)	3:56
11.	"Got to Be Certain" (from Kylie)	3:19
12.	"Je Ne Sais Pas Pourquoi" (from Kylie)	4:01
13.	"Give Me Just a Little More Time" (from Let's Get to It)	3:06
14.	"Never Too Late" (from Enjoy Yourself)	3:21
15.	"Tears on My Pillow" (from Enjoy Yourself)	2:29
16.	"Celebration" (from Greatest Hits)	3:57
17.	"Did It Again" (single version; from Impossible Princess)	4:14
18.	"Breathe" (radio edit; from Impossible Princess)	3:40

Japanese edition (Disc two)
No.	Title	Length
1.	"I Believe in You"	3:21
2.	"Can't Get You Out of My Head" (from Fever)	3:49
3.	"Love at First Sight" (from Fever)	3:57
4.	"Slow" (from Body Language)	3:13
5.	"On a Night Like This" (from Light Years)	3:33
6.	"Spinning Around" (from Light Years)	3:27
7.	"Kids" (radio edit; with Robbie Williams; from Light Years)	4:20
8.	"Confide in Me" (radio edit; from Kylie Minogue)	4:26
9.	"In Your Eyes" (from Fever)	3:18
10.	"Please Stay" (from Light Years)	4:04
11.	"Red Blooded Woman" (from Body Language)	4:20
12.	"Giving You Up"	3:30
13.	"Chocolate" (radio edit; from Body Language)	4:01
14.	"Come into My World" (single version; from Fever)	4:06
15.	"Put Yourself in My Place" (radio edit; from Kylie Minogue)	4:11
16.	"Where the Wild Roses Grow" (with Nick Cave; from Murder Ballads)	3:57
17.	"Can't Get Blue Monday Out of My Head"	4:03
18.	"Slow" (Chemical Brothers remix)	3:57

Ultimate Kylie – DVD / Showgirl Homecoming special edition – DVD
No.	Title	Length
1.	"I Should Be So Lucky"	3:28
2.	"Got to Be Certain"	3:20
3.	"The Loco-Motion" (7" mix)	3:22
4.	"Je Ne Sais Pas Pourquoi"	3:22
5.	"Especially for You" (with Jason Donovan)	3:44
6.	"Hand on Your Heart" (video mix)	3:44
7.	"Wouldn't Change a Thing"	3:19
8.	"Never Too Late"	3:26
9.	"Tears on My Pillow"	2:33
10.	"Better the Devil You Know"	3:59
11.	"Step Back in Time"	3:09
12.	"What Do I Have to Do?" (7" mix)	3:39
13.	"Shocked" (DNA 7" mix)	3:13
14.	"Give Me Just a Little More Time"	3:09
15.	"Celebration"	4:04
16.	"Confide in Me" (master mix)	6:02
17.	"Put Yourself in My Place" (radio edit)	4:12
18.	"Where the Wild Roses Grow"	4:08
19.	"Did It Again" (radio edit)	3:53
20.	"Breathe" (radio edit)	3:40
21.	"Spinning Around"	3:32
22.	"On a Night Like This"	4:12
23.	"Kids" (with Robbie Williams)	4:49
24.	"Please Stay"	4:08
25.	"Can't Get You Out of My Head" (radio edit)	3:16
26.	"In Your Eyes"	3:23
27.	"Love at First Sight"	4:01
28.	"Come into My World" (single version)	4:18
29.	"Slow"	3:59
30.	"Red Blooded Woman"	4:14
31.	"Chocolate" (radio edit)	4:09
Total length:		118:27

DVD bonus feature
No.	Title	Length
32.	"I Believe in You"	3:25
33.	"Can't Get Blue Monday Out of My Head" (live at the Brit Awards)	4:11
Total length:		7:36

Notes

- The German edition replaces "Please Stay" with "Your Disco Needs You" (Casino Radio & Club Mix)

== Charts ==
=== Weekly charts ===
Weekly chart performance for Ultimate Kylie
Chart (2004–2005)	Peak position
Australian Albums (ARIA)	5
Austrian Albums (Ö3 Austria)	15
Belgian Albums (Ultratop Flanders)	14
Belgian Albums (Ultratop Wallonia)	35
Danish Albums (Hitlisten)	17
Dutch Albums (Album Top 100)	37
Finnish Albums (Suomen virallinen lista)	24
German Albums (Offizielle Top 100)	10
Greek Albums (IFPI)	9
Irish Albums (IRMA)	8
Italian Albums (FIMI)	42
Japanese Albums (Oricon)	39
New Zealand Albums (RMNZ)	33
Norwegian Albums (VG-lista)	18
Scottish Albums (Official Charts)	5
Spanish Albums (Promusicae)	34
Swedish Albums (Sverigetopplistan)	23
Swiss Albums (Schweizer Hitparade)	19
UK Albums (Official Charts)	4

=== Year-end charts ===
2004 year-end chart performance for Ultimate Kylie
Chart (2004)	Position
Australian Albums (ARIA)	42
UK Albums (OCC)	22

2005 year-end chart performance for Ultimate Kylie
Chart (2005)	Position
Australian Albums (ARIA)	38
Belgian Albums (Ultratop Flanders)	82
German Albums (Official Top 100)	74
UK Albums (OCC)	86

2006 year-end chart performance for Ultimate Kylie
Chart (2006)	Position
Australian Albums (ARIA)	40

=== Decade-end charts ===
Decade-end chart performance for Ultimate Kylie
Chart (2000–2009)	Position
Australian Albums (ARIA)	82

== Certifications and sales ==
Certifications and sales for Ultimate Kylie album
Region	Certification	Certified units/sales
Australia (ARIA)	4× Platinum	280,000^{^}
Austria (IFPI Austria)	Gold	15,000^{*}
Belgium (BRMA)	Platinum	50,000^{*}
Ireland (IRMA)	3× Platinum	45,000^{^}
Spain (Promusicae)	Gold	50,000^{^}
United Kingdom (BPI)	3× Platinum	900,000^{*}
United States	—	50,000
Summaries
Europe (IFPI)	Platinum	1,000,000^{*}
^{*} Sales figures based on certification alone.^{^} Shipments figures based on certification alone.

Certifications and sales for Ultimate Kylie video
Region	Certification	Certified units/sales
Argentina (CAPIF)	Platinum	8,000^{^}
Australia (ARIA)	3× Platinum	45,000^{^}
France (SNEP)	Gold	10,000^{*}
United Kingdom (BPI)	2× Platinum	100,000^{^}
^{*} Sales figures based on certification alone.^{^} Shipments figures based on certification alone.

== Album credits ==
- Mastered by Ashley Phase at Whitfield Street Mastering.
- Liner notes written by Neil Rees & Nigel Goodall with thanks and acknowledgement to Tom Parker.
- Kylie's visual direction and styling by William Baker.
- Photography by Simon Emmett.
- Sleeve direction and design and photo montages by Tony Hung for Adjective Noun.
