= No Control (film) =

1927 film

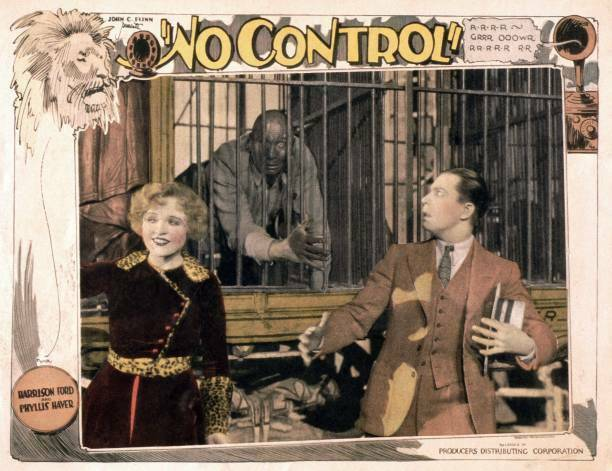
- Directed by: Scott Sidney
- Written by: Frank Condon (story); Tay Garnett; Zelda Sears
- Produced by: John C. Flinn
- Starring: Harrison Ford; Phyllis Haver; Jack Duffy
- Cinematography: Georges Benoît
- Production company: Metropolitan Pictures Corporation of California
- Distributed by: Producers Distributing Corporation
- Release date: April 7, 1927
- Running time: 60 minutes
- Country: United States
- Languages: Silent; Sound (Synchronized); English Intertitles

No Control is a 1927 American silent comedy film directed by Scott Sidney and starring Harrison Ford, Phyllis Haver and Jack Duffy. Due to the public apathy towards silent films, a sound version was also prepared in 1928. While the sound version has no audible dialog, it was released with a synchronized musical score with sound effects using both the sound-on-disc and sound-on-film process.

== Cast ==
- Harrison Ford as John Douglas Jr
- Phyllis Haver as Nancy Flood
- Jack Duffy as Noah Flood
- Tom Wilson as Asthma
- Toby Claude as Mrs. Douglas
- E.J. Ratcliffe as John Douglas
- Larry Steers as Kid Dugan
- Albert Schaefer as The Fat Kid

== Music ==
The sound version features a theme song entitled “I’ve No Control of My Heart” by Marian Gillespie (words) and John Hagen (music).

== Bibliography ==
- Connelly, Robert B. The Silents: Silent Feature Films, 1910-36, Volume 40, Issue 2. December Press, 1998.
- Munden, Kenneth White. The American Film Institute Catalog of Motion Pictures Produced in the United States, Part 1. University of California Press, 1997.
