= Postcards (Sparkadia album) =

Studio album by Sparkadia
- Released: 31 May 2008
- Recorded: 2007–2008, London
- Genre: Alternative rock
- Length: 45:10
- Label: Ivy League

Sparkadia chronology
Things Behind the Sun (2007)	Postcards (2008)	The Great Impression (2011)

Singles from Postcards
- 1. "Animals" Released: 10 November 2007; 2. "Too Much to Do" Released: 14 February 2008; 3. "Jealousy" Released: 7 July 2008; 4. "Morning Light" Released: 26 December 2008

Postcards is the debut album by Australian alternative rock band Sparkadia. The album was recorded in 2007 in London. Sparkadia worked with producer Ben Hillier who has previously worked with famous acts such as; U2, Blur, Doves, Suede and Depeche Mode. Frontman Alexander Burnett stated that "Postcards is a grower, once you listen to it a few times you begin to appreciate it".

At the J Awards of 2008, the album was nominated for Australian Album of the Year.

== Track listing ==
1. "Too Much to Do" – 3:10
2. "Kiss of Death" – 3:15
3. "Morning Light" – 3:43
4. "Help Yourself" – 3:10
5. "Connected" – 4:48
6. "Our Own Way" – 3:49
7. "Animals" – 3:01
8. "Up in the Air" – 3:19
9. "The Last Thing You Need" – 3:45
10. "Jealousy" – 4:36
11. "Space and Time" – 3:48
12. "Sleeping Lion" – 4:51

== Charts ==
Chart performance for Postcards
Chart (2008)	Peak position
Australian Albums (ARIA)	23
