= No Control (Turbo Fruits album) =

Studio album by Turbo Fruits
- Released: April 21, 2015
- Recorded: 2015, Battle Tapes Recording, Nashville, Tennessee, US
- Genre: Alternative rock, garage rock, punk rock
- Length: 36:00
- Label: Melvin, Turbo Time
- Producer: Jeremy Ferguson, Patrick Carney

Turbo Fruits chronology
Butter (2012)	No Control (2015)

Singles from No Control
- 1. "The Way I Want You"; 2. "Don't Let Me Break Your Heart Again"; 3. "No Reason to Stay"

No Control is an album by American band Turbo Fruits, which was released on April 21, 2015.

== Track listing ==
All songs were produced by Jeremy Ferguson, except where noted.

All tracks are written by Jonas Stein, Kingsley Brock, Dave McCowen and Matt Hearn.

No.	Title	Length
1.	"Show Me Something Real"	3:47
2.	"The Way I Want You" (producer: Patrick Carney)	3:05
3.	"Don't Let Me Break Your Heart Again"	4:00
4.	"Favorite Girl"	2:51
5.	"Need to Know"	3:22
6.	"Don't Change"	3:32
7.	"No Reason to Stay" (producer: Carney)	3:15
8.	"Friends"	2:30
9.	"Blow These Clouds"	2:17
10.	"Worry About You"	3:15
11.	"Big Brother"	4:15
Total length:		36:00

== Personnel ==
Turbo Fruits

- Jonas Stein – vocals, guitar
- Kingsley Brock – vocals, guitar
- Dave McCowen – bass guitar
- Matt Hearn – drums

Additional personnel

- Matt Rowland – keys
- Jeremy Ferguson – keys, guitar

Production

- Jeremy Ferguson & Patrick Carney
- Mastered by Marc Chevalier
- Engineered by Matt Legge & Roger Moutenot
- Cover art by Jamin Orrall
- Band photo by Karlo X Ramos
- Layout & design by Isaiah Lujan
