= Showgirl: The Greatest Hits Tour =

2005 concert tour by Kylie Minogue

- Tour by Kylie Minogue
- Promotional poster for the tour
- Location: Europe
- Associated album: Ultimate Kylie
- Start date: 19 March 2005
- End date: 7 May 2005
- Legs: 1
- No. of shows: 37
- Box office: US$19.97 million (23 reported shows)

Kylie Minogue concert chronology
- KylieFever2002 (2002); Showgirl: The Greatest Hits Tour (2005); Showgirl: Homecoming Tour (2006–07)

Showgirl: The Greatest Hits Tour was the eighth concert tour by Australian singer Kylie Minogue. It was launched in support of her second major greatest hits compilation, Ultimate Kylie (2004) and visited Europe. It began on 19 March 2005 in Glasgow, Scotland at SECC Concert Hall 4 and concluded on 7 May 2005 in London, England at the Earls Court Exhibition Centre. The tour was announced on 24 October 2004, promoted by 3A Entertainment in Europe and Frontier Touring in Asia and Australia. Showgirl: The Greatest Hits Tour was intended to be a celebration of both Minogue's career and long-term relationship with her audience.

Eight distinct sections divided the tour; Showgirl, Smiley Kylie, Denial, What Kylie Wants, Kylie Gets, Dreams, Kyliesque, Minx in Space, and an encore. It featured costumes from designers such as Karl Lagerfeld and Julien Macdonald, as well as the iconic showgirl costume designed by John Galliano. The tour also featured an Art Deco-inspired stage costing £1,000,000. The set list consisted of Minogue's greatest hits along with the singles from Ultimate Kylie.

The tour was also commercially successful. The shows in the United Kingdom sold out in two hours and went on to gross nearly $20 million. In Europe, 339,105 tickets were sold in total. The tour also placed 46th on Pollstar's 2005 "Top 100 Worldwide Tours" at the conclusion of the year. Footage from the 6 May show in London was also filmed for television broadcast and DVD release. It was released on DVD in November 2005, titled Showgirl. The following month, a live album of the same name was released, featuring eight songs from the show.

Twenty shows in Australia and three shows in Asia were originally scheduled for the tour. Following the conclusion of the European leg, Minogue travelled to Australia to continue the tour, where she was diagnosed with breast cancer. The remainder of the tour, including a headlining slot at the 2005 Glastonbury Festival, was consequently cancelled. The shows in Australia were rescheduled and 14 additional shows in the United Kingdom were added following Minogue's recovery. The tour resumed in November 2006, renamed Showgirl: Homecoming Tour, with a revised set list and new costumes to accommodate her medical state.

== Background ==
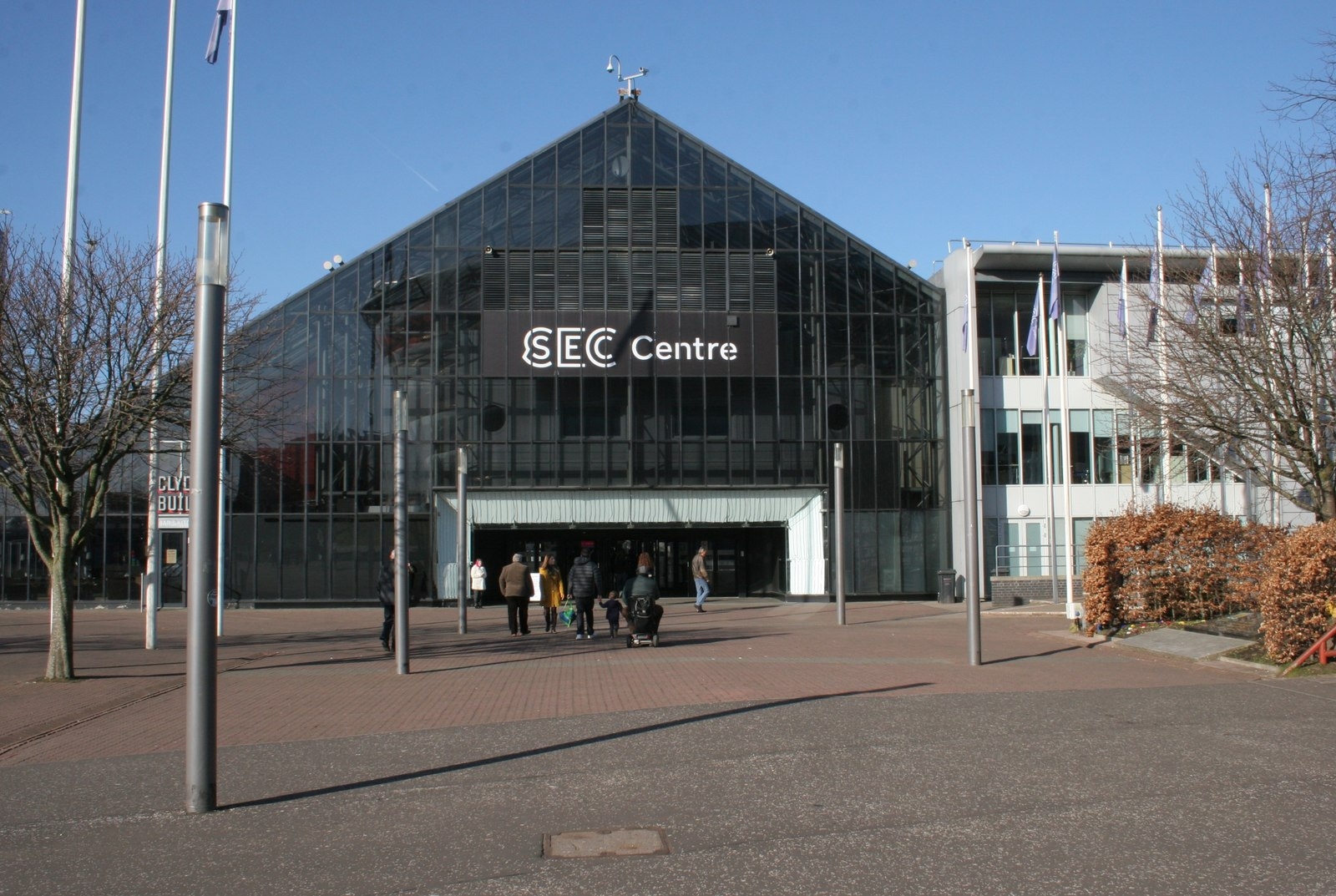
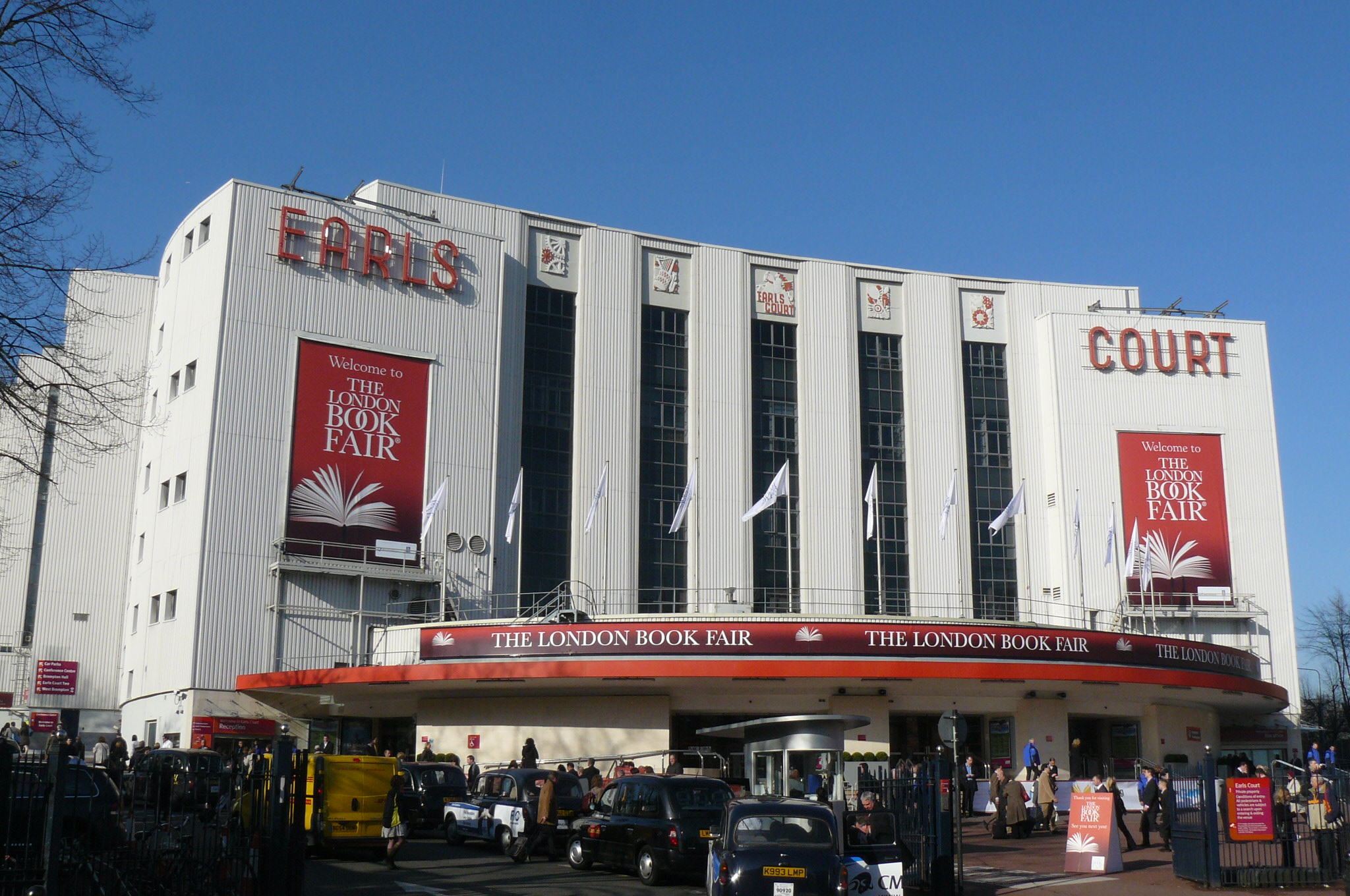
Showgirl: The Greatest Hits Tour commenced in Glasgow, Scotland at the SECC Concert Hall 4 (left) and concluded in London, England at the Earls Court Exhibition Centre (right).

Following a "lacklustre" reception to the release of her ninth studio album, Body Language (2003), Minogue's second major greatest hits compilation was announced in August 2004. In October of the same year, it was announced that Minogue would embark on Showgirl: The Greatest Hits Tour to promote the compilation, and Ultimate Kylie was released to critical reception the following month. She described the tour as "a celebration of pop songs and my career, but also a long-term relationship with my audience". The tour was promoted by 3A Entertainment in Europe and Frontier Touring in Asia and Australia.

Dates for shows in Europe were announced first. All shows in the United Kingdom sold out within two hours. The announcement of dates in Australia and Asia followed, as well as a headline appearance at the 2005 Glastonbury Festival. Minogue was scheduled to be the first female to headline the festival since 1999.

== Postponements and cancellations ==
Prior to the tour, Minogue saw a doctor over concerns about breast cancer, but was given the all-clear. The tour commenced and, following the conclusion of the European shows, she travelled to Australia to continue the tour. On 17 May 2005, it was announced that Minogue had been diagnosed with breast cancer during a family visit to Melbourne, and would undergo immediate treatment. As a consequence, the remaining dates of Showgirl: The Greatest Hits Tour were cancelled. In a statement issued by her record company, Minogue said that she "was so looking forward to bringing the Showgirl tour to Australia and to Glastonbury and I'm sorry to have to disappoint my fans". She later underwent a lumpectomy and an eight-month cycle of chemotherapy and radiotherapy.

=== Tour resumption ===
Following Minogue's recovery, the resumption of the tour was announced in June 2006. The rescheduled tour was renamed Showgirl: Homecoming Tour, and was originally planned to consist of dates in Australia only. Shows in the United Kingdom were added, and the tour commenced in November 2006. Alterations to the set list, choreography and costumes were made to accommodate Minogue's medical condition.

== Concert synopsis ==
The show was split into seven acts: Showgirl, Smiley Kylie, Denial, What Kylie Wants, Kylie Gets, Dreams, Kyliesque and Minx in Space, with the addition of an encore. The show opens with an instrumental introduction dubbed the "Showgirl Overture". Minogue then rises out of the stage dressed in a blue showgirl outfit, going on to sing "Better the Devil You Know", which is quickly followed by performances of "In Your Eyes" and "Giving You Up". Minogue then performs "On a Night Like This", beginning as a ballad, which closes the first section of the show.

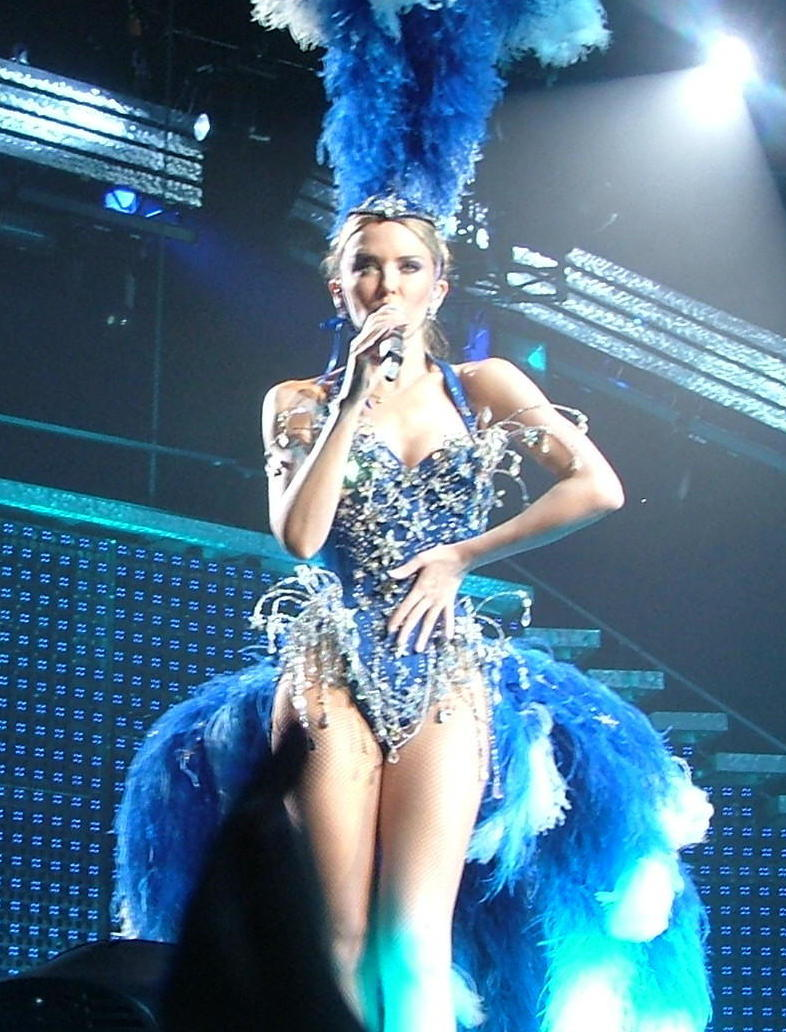
Minogue performing in Paris, France at the Zénith de Paris

The second section begins with a dance interlude, using excerpts of "Do You Dare?", before Minogue rises out of the centre of the stage to perform a medley of "Shocked", "What Do I Have to Do" and "Spinning Around". During this medley, several other songs are sampled and interpolated, such as: "It's No Secret", "Keep on Pumpin' It", "Give Me Just a Little More Time", "What Kind of Fool (Heard All That Before)", "I'm Over Dreaming (Over You)", "Finally"), "Step Back in Time" and "Such a Good Feeling".

The third section begins with a performance of "In Denial", a virtual duet with Neil Tennant. This is followed by a performance of "Je Ne Sais Pas Pourquoi", before Minogue closes the act with a performance of "Confide in Me".

The fourth act begins with fake showers and gym equipment rising onto the stage, before Minogue appears to sing "Red Blooded Woman", which features a chorus of "Where the Wild Roses Grow". Minogue then performs "Slow" which is followed by a performance of "Please Stay".

The fifth section begins with a cover of "Somewhere Over the Rainbow" where Minogue rises from behind the stage on a sequinned moon. This is then followed by a torch version of "Come into My World". Minogue then performs "Chocolate" and "I Believe in You", the latter being performed atop the transformed "cake lift". The act closes with a performance of "Dreams".

The sixth section opens with a performance of "Hand on Your Heart", where Minogue emerges on stage in front of a big heart. She then goes on to perform a jazz version of "The Locomotion" which is followed by a performance of "I Should Be So Lucky". Minogue then closes the act with a performance of "Your Disco Needs You".

The penultimate section opens with a performance version of "Put Yourself in My Place", and a performance of "Can't Get You Out of My Head" closes the main body of the show. Minogue then performed a two-song encore, performing a sing-a-long version of "Especially for You", before closing the show with a performance of "Love at First Sight", as a video montage of her career is shown on the video screens behind her.

== Setlist ==
Act 1: Showgirl

1. "Overture"
2. "Better the Devil You Know"
3. "In Your Eyes"
4. "Giving You Up"
5. "On a Night Like This"

Act 2: Smiley Kylie

6. "Shocked" (contains excerpts from "Do You Dare?", "It's No Secret", "Give Me Just A Little More Time", "Keep on Pumpin' It" and "What Kind of Fool (Heard All That Before)")
7. "What Do I Have to Do" (contains excerpt from "I'm Over Dreaming (Over You)")
8. "Spinning Around" (contains excerpts from "Step Back in Time" along with elements of "Finally" and "Such a Good Feeling")

Act 3: Denial

9. "In Denial" (virtual duet with Neil Tennant)
10. "Je Ne Sais Pas Pourquoi"
11. "Confide in Me"

Act 4: What Kylie Wants, Kylie Gets

12. "Red Blooded Woman" (contains excerpts from "Where the Wild Roses Grow")
13. "Slow"
14. "Please Stay"

Act 5: Dreams

15. "Over the Rainbow"
16. "Come into My World"
17. "Chocolate"
18. "I Believe in You"
19. "Dreams"

Act 6: Kyliesque

20. "Hand on Your Heart"
21. "The Loco-Motion"
22. "I Should Be So Lucky"
23. "Your Disco Needs You"

Act 7: Minx in Space

24. "Put Yourself in My Place"
25. "Can't Get You Out of My Head"

Encore

26. "Especially for You" (Intro contains an excerpt of "Love's in Need of Love Today")
27. "Love at First Sight"

== Broadcasts and recordings ==
Minogue's performance at Earls Court Exhibition Centre in London on 6 May 2005 was filmed for television broadcast and DVD release. The performance was released on DVD and Universal Media Disc on 28 November 2005, and was simply titled Showgirl. The DVD also featured "Behind the Feathers", a documentary, screensavers and exclusive photographs. The DVD reached number twenty-six on Australia's End of the Year Music DVD Chart in 2005. It was certified platinum in the UK in 2005 and four times platinum in Australia in 2006. Showgirl was nominated for Best Music DVD at the 2006 ARIA Music Awards, losing to Eskimo Joe.

On 12 December 2005, Minogue released a digital EP featuring eight songs recorded in London, England during the Showgirl: The Greatest Hits Tour, again titled Showgirl.

== Tour dates ==
List of concerts
Date (2005)	City	Country	Venue	Opening acts
19 March	Glasgow	Scotland	SECC Concert Hall 4	Melody Club
20 March	Glasgow	Scotland	SECC Concert Hall 4	Melody Club
22 March	Glasgow	Scotland	SECC Concert Hall 4	Melody Club
23 March	Glasgow	Scotland	SECC Concert Hall 4	Melody Club
24 March	Glasgow	Scotland	SECC Concert Hall 4	Melody Club
26 March	Paris	France	Zénith de Paris	Melody Club
27 March	Rotterdam	Netherlands	Rotterdam Ahoy Sportpaleis	Melody Club
28 March	Antwerp	Belgium	Sportpaleis	Melody Club
30 March	Vienna	Austria	Wiener Stadthalle	Melody Club
31 March	Munich	Germany	Olympiahalle	Melody Club
1 April	Basel	Switzerland	St. Jakobshalle	Melody Club
3 April	Aalborg	Denmark	Gigantium	Melody Club
4 April	Hamburg	Germany	Color Line Arena	Melody Club
5 April	Cologne	Germany	Kölnarena	Melody Club
7 April	Dublin	Ireland	Point Theatre	Melody Club
8 April	Dublin	Ireland	Point Theatre	Melody Club
9 April	Dublin	Ireland	Point Theatre	Melody Club
11 April	Dublin	Ireland	Point Theatre	Melody Club
12 April	Dublin	Ireland	Point Theatre	Melody Club
15 April	Birmingham	England	NEC Arena	Melody Club
16 April	Birmingham	England	NEC Arena	Melody Club
17 April	Birmingham	England	NEC Arena	Melody Club
19 April	Birmingham	England	NEC Arena	Melody Club
20 April	Birmingham	England	NEC Arena	Melody Club
21 April	Birmingham	England	NEC Arena	Melody Club
23 April	Manchester	England	MEN Arena	Melody Club
24 April	Manchester	England	MEN Arena	Melody Club
26 April	Manchester	England	MEN Arena	Melody Club
27 April	Manchester	England	MEN Arena	Melody Club
28 April	Manchester	England	MEN Arena	Melody Club
30 April	London	England	Earls Court Exhibition Centre	Melody Club
1 May	London	England	Earls Court Exhibition Centre	Melody Club
2 May	London	England	Earls Court Exhibition Centre	Melody Club
4 May	London	England	Earls Court Exhibition Centre	Melody Club
5 May	London	England	Earls Court Exhibition Centre	Melody Club
6 May	London	England	Earls Court Exhibition Centre	Melody Club
7 May	London	England	Earls Court Exhibition Centre	Melody Club

=== Cancelled shows ===
List of concerts, showing date, city, country, venue and reason for cancellation
Date	City	Country	Venue	Reason
19 May 2005	Sydney	Australia	Sydney Super Dome	Breast cancer diagnosis
20 May 2005	Sydney	Australia	Sydney Super Dome	Breast cancer diagnosis
21 May 2005	Sydney	Australia	Sydney Super Dome	Breast cancer diagnosis
23 May 2005	Melbourne	Australia	Rod Laver Arena	Breast cancer diagnosis
24 May 2005	Melbourne	Australia	Rod Laver Arena	Breast cancer diagnosis
25 May 2005	Melbourne	Australia	Rod Laver Arena	Breast cancer diagnosis
27 May 2005	Melbourne	Australia	Rod Laver Arena	Breast cancer diagnosis
28 May 2005	Melbourne	Australia	Rod Laver Arena	Breast cancer diagnosis
29 May 2005	Melbourne	Australia	Rod Laver Arena	Breast cancer diagnosis
31 May 2005	Sydney	Australia	Sydney Entertainment Centre	Breast cancer diagnosis
1 June 2005	Sydney	Australia	Sydney Entertainment Centre	Breast cancer diagnosis
2 June 2005	Sydney	Australia	Sydney Entertainment Centre	Breast cancer diagnosis
4 June 2005	Brisbane	Australia	Brisbane Entertainment Centre	Breast cancer diagnosis
5 June 2005	Brisbane	Australia	Brisbane Entertainment Centre	Breast cancer diagnosis
6 June 2005	Brisbane	Australia	Brisbane Entertainment Centre	Breast cancer diagnosis
8 June 2005	Adelaide	Australia	Adelaide Entertainment Centre	Breast cancer diagnosis
9 June 2005	Adelaide	Australia	Adelaide Entertainment Centre	Breast cancer diagnosis
12 June 2005	Perth	Australia	Burswood Dome	Breast cancer diagnosis
13 June 2005	Perth	Australia	Burswood Dome	Breast cancer diagnosis
14 June 2005	Perth	Australia	Burswood Dome	Breast cancer diagnosis
17 June 2005	Singapore		Singapore Indoor Stadium	Breast cancer diagnosis
20 June 2005	Bangkok	Thailand	IMPACT Arena	Breast cancer diagnosis
23 June 2005	Hong Kong		HKCEC Hall 3	Breast cancer diagnosis
26 June 2005 (Note: Intended to be part of Glastonbury.)	Pilton	England	Worthy Farm	Breast cancer diagnosis

== Box office score data ==
Venue	City	Attendance	Gross revenue
SECC Concert Hall 4	Glasgow	43,100 / 43,100	$3,040,468
MEN Arena	Manchester	74,060 / 74,060	$5,234,740
Earls Court Exhibition Centre	London	105,840 / 105,840	$7,125,132
Total		288,976 / 288,976 (100%)	$19,972,894

== Personnel ==
- Russel Thomas – director
- Bill Lord – executive producer
- Kylie Minogue – executive producer
- Terry Blamey – executive producer
- William Baker – creative director
- Alan MacDonald – creative director
- Steve Anderson – musical producer
- Sean Fitzpatrick – tour manager
- Michael Rooney – choreography
- Rafael Bonachela – choreography
- John Galliano – costume design
- Karl Lagerfeld – costume design
- Julien Macdonald – costume design
- Ed Meadham – costume design
- Gareth Pugh – costume design
- Manolo Blahnik – shoes
- Bvlgari – jewelry
- Stephen Jones – millinery
- Karen Alder – hair stylist

== See also ==
- "2005 Showgirl – The Greatest Hits Tour"
- SHOWGIRL 2005
- Kylie Minogue SHOW GIRL the Greatest Hits tour – 2005
