= I Believe in You (Kylie Minogue song) =

2004 single by Kylie Minogue

Single by Kylie Minogue

from the album Ultimate Kylie
- B-side: "B.P.M."
- Released: 29 November 2004
- Recorded: 2004
- Studio: EMI (London, England)
- Genre: Pop; Euro disco
- Length: 3:21
- Label: Festival Mushroom; Parlophone
- Songwriters: Kylie Minogue; Jake Shears; Babydaddy
- Producers: Jake Shears; Babydaddy

Kylie Minogue singles chronology
"Chocolate" (2004)	"I Believe in You" (2004)	"Giving You Up" (2005)

Music video
- "I Believe in You" on YouTube

"I Believe in You" is a song by Australian singer Kylie Minogue from her second major greatest hits album, Ultimate Kylie (2004). It was released as the lead single from the compilation on 29 November 2004. Minogue co-wrote the song alongside its producers: Jake Shears and Babydaddy from Scissor Sisters. "I Believe in You" is a pop and Euro disco song in which Minogue proclaims there are many things in which she does not believe, but that she does believe in the listener.

"I Believe in You" received positive reviews from music critics. Commercially the song was also successful, reaching number one in Romania, number two in the United Kingdom and number six in Australia. The song became a dance hit in the United States, peaking at number three on the Billboard Dance Club Play chart and number four on the Billboard Dance Radio Airplay chart. It earned a nomination for a 2006 Grammy Award in the Best Dance Recording category.

== Background ==
In August 2004, it was announced that Minogue would be recording new tracks, rumored to be some kind of Christmas material. The month after, it was announced that the artist would be releasing a greatest hits album, titled Ultimate Kylie, containing two new tracks, being "I Believe in You" and "Giving You Up"; Jake Shears and Babydaddy were in charge of the production of the former, whilst the latter was produced by Brian Higgins and Xenomania. A separate compilation DVD with the same name, containing several music videos by the singer, was also released to coincide with the distribution of the album. In the same statement, it was announced that "I Believe in You" would be the lead single from the compilation.

Minogue's collaboration with Shears and Babydaddy was seen as unlikely by many, including the singer herself. "When the idea of working together came up I thought, 'well, I love their album but that is not the music I make'. However, we got on immediately; we were on the same wavelength", she said. However, the pair agreed to work with Minogue after discovering they were both huge fans of each other's music. Shears said they "gelled" whilst in the studio, elaborating that the experience "has been really surreal and cool. I was so anxious beforehand, I had jet lag and just wanted to make something good and we've had a fantastic time. Actually we're really collaborating and it went really well and I'm happy because I think she had a really good time. I think we made some really good stuff. We just got down to business. We were down there (in the studio) for long days so I feel like we got to know each other quite a bit which was pretty fun".

== Composition ==
"I Believe in You"

"I Believe in You" is a pop and Euro disco song, which features the use of synthesizers and keyboards. The lyrics of the song, co-written by Minogue, describe how she does not believe in anything except her lover, although the song details of a spirit the speaker believes in hence the lyrics "I don't believe that when you die your presence isn't felt." Written and recorded for Ultimate Kylie during the summer of 2004 in London, the song takes its inspiration from disco and 80s new wave electropop music, and has been described as similar to 80s-era New Order.

The song opens with a keyboard playing the choral melody. This melody is maintained throughout the song, except for occasional pauses for Minogue's verses. As the song continues, drums and synth strings are added into the background, which continue through the whole song. The refrain features Minogue singing a high octave chorus with strings and a thumping beat in the background. "I love it. It does everything it's meant to do and then some," said Minogue about the song.

== Critical response ==
"I Believe in You" received a positive response from many music critics. A review by Mark Edwards from Stylus Magazine called the song "a masterpiece" and "a fabulous return to form" from her previous album, Body Language, which was not well reviewed by some music critics. Joey Rivaldo, in a review for About.com, said the song was "perfect for radio" and praised it for its "nice laid back pop sound." Rivaldo also said that "although it has taken a while for many to catch on to this tune, looking back, many say it was well worth the wait." In his review, Rivaldo gave the song three out of five stars. In another review for About.com, Jason Shawahn called the song "one of the finest eurodisco confections to come down the pike since the glory days". Virgin.net called the song a "rather demure and stylish collaboration" with Jake Shears and Babbydaddy, and said that "while it may all lack any really enticing hooks (or particularly interesting lyrics), it's still quite an enchanting record" due to its "pulsing analogue bassline and kick drum combo."

The song was nominated for an ARIA Award in Australia for "Best Pop Release" in 2005, and Minogue garnered a nomination for "Best Female Artist", providing her with an ARIA Award nomination for the eighth consecutive year. The song was also nominated for a 2006 Grammy Award in the "Best Dance Recording" category, providing Minogue with a Grammy nomination in that category for the fourth consecutive year.

== Release and commercial performance ==
"I Believe in You" debuted on radio on 14 October 2004. It was released on 29 November 2004 in Australia and on 6 December in the United Kingdom. In the UK, it debuted and peaked at number two on the UK singles chart, remaining in the top 10 for four consecutive weeks and spent 13 weeks on the chart in total. As March 2014, it sold 150,000 copies in the UK. In most European countries, the song was a top-10 hit on both the singles and airplay charts, reaching number one in Romania, number two in Denmark and Scotland, number four in Austria, number five in Hungary, Iceland, and Spain, number six in Switzerland, number nine in Ireland, and number ten in the Netherlands. It additionally reached the top 20 in Italy, Germany, Belgium (Flanders and Wallonia), Norway, Sweden, and Finland. In France, the song made a relatively low chart showing, peaking at number 35, which was mainly due to the fact that the single was not made commercially available until the following year and could only be purchased as an import single at the time of its commercial release.

In the United States, the single did not chart on the Billboard Hot 100, but did peak at number three on the Billboard Hot Dance Club Play chart and number four on the Billboard Hot Dance Airplay chart. The single returned Minogue to popularity in the American dance market (her last single, "Chocolate", did not chart on any Billboard issues). However, the song did not gain popularity outside of the dance music market. In New Zealand, it debuted at number 38, then after two weeks, it peaked at number 29, but dropped out after five weeks.

== Music video ==
=== Background and synopsis ===
The accompanying music video for "I Believe in You" was directed by Vernie Yeung and choreographed by Rafael Bonachela. The premise of the futuristic video involved Minogue performing different scenarios within a studio filled with colourful neon lights. The clip opens with Minogue standing in the centre of a large "sphere" enclosed by neon lights as it revolves around her. Upon reaching the second verse, a new sphere, with a new set of lights, is added around Minogue, as she wears a new costume and glitter around her eyes. These notable high-end visual effects were done by Soho-based company The Mill, who were responsible for enhancing the light bars on these spheres, as well as adding a new light with each new sphere introduced. The video progresses to Minogue dancing before a psychedelic flash of swirling colours, before resolving to a black background lit up by a troupe of dancers wearing "glow effects". It was revealed that these multi-coloured light bulbs were actually attached to the bodies of the dancers, who had to carry their power sources around in makeshift "shopping" bags for the duration of the shoot. As the video concludes, these four sequences are then intercut amongst each other until they gradually fade out.

Costumes for the video were designed by Dolce & Gabbana, and consisted of a series of dresses which Minogue described as "floaty", including a dress of purple silk chiffon with gold mesh fabric bra-top and girdle, worn with gold metallic shoes made by Chloé. They were then donated to the Arts Centre Melbourne (displayed in the Kylie Minogue Collection) by Kylie herself in 2006.

=== Release and reception ===
The complete version of "I Believe in You" featured in the music video has been released commercially through CD singles and digital downloads, and some include remixes by Mylo and Skylark. The video was released commercially on the Ultimate Kylie companion DVD, released in December 2004.

== Remixes ==
Three official remixes were commissioned to promote the song. Mylo created two remixes, the Mylo Vocal and the Mylo Dub, which use the song's original vocals over a new bassline constructed with synthesizers and some electric guitar. The remixes received positive reviews from music critics. About.com stated that the remix provides the song with an "electro trip", commenting that it is "the perfect mix for all the Mixshow DJs out there." Skylark's mix features a kick beat and according to About.com is "more geared toward the clubs" as it is more "underground" than Mylo's remixes.

All three remixes were included on the CD single and offered through downloads in December 2004. A radically different version of the song was crafted in 2007 for The Kylie Show, a one-off television program that aired on UK's ITV on 10 November 2007 as a marketing vehicle for her tenth studio album X. The new version changed the song from an up-tempo electronic song into a torch song. This version was also performed by Minogue during her KylieX2008 concert world tour.

== B-side ==
"B.P.M." was released as the B-side to the commercial single release of "I Believe in You". The song was produced by Richard Stannard, and Julian Gallagher (collectively known as BiffCo), and was written by Minogue, Stannard and Gallagher. The song had gone through many incarnations; it began as an instrumental track written by Stannard and Gallagher titled "Sunset River", and when the two began working with Minogue, lyrics were added and changes were made to the music. Originally recorded during the Body Language album sessions in 2003, the song was not released until the release of Ultimate Kylie a year later. "B.P.M." was one of the many songs that were considered to be added to the album as a new track, but was released as a B-side to "I Believe in You" instead.

== Live performances ==
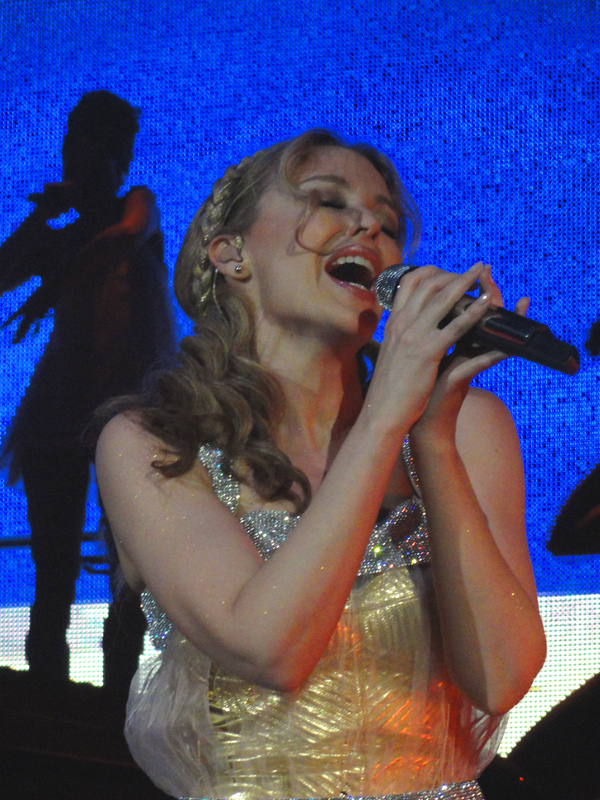
Minogue performing the song on her Aphrodite: Les Folies Tour (2011)

In order to promote Ultimate Kylie and the single, Minogue performed "I Believe in You" in shows such as Quelli che... il calcio, Top of the Pops, Nordic Music Awards, Top of the Pops Saturday, Premios Ondas, Star Academy, Hit Machine, Today with Des and Mel, and Wetten, dass..?.

The song was included on the 2005 Showgirl: The Greatest Hits Tour. Minogue was unable to complete the tour as she was diagnosed with early breast cancer and had to cancel the Australian leg of the tour. After undergoing treatment and recovery, she resumed the concert tour in the form of Showgirl: The Homecoming Tour in 2006, and "I Believe in You" was again added to the set list.

She performed a ballad version, described as orchestral, of the song on her KylieX2008 and was described as a blue train by newspapers. This song was performed as part of all four set orders in the act entitled "Starry Nights" (or "Beach Party" in the case of one leg). She performed the same version on her For You, for Me tour in 2009 in the fifth act, following performances of "White Diamond" and "Confide in Me". Minogue performed the song again in 2011 on her Aphrodite: Les Folies Tour, where there is slight remixing. It was performed in the second act following a performance of "Illusion". She is pulled round the stage on a chariot by her male dancers who are dressed to resemble horses. She most recently performed the song on her Golden Tour, replacing "Breathe".

Minogue also performed the song as a ballad on Star Academy with Quentin Mosimann, and The Kylie Show TV special. In 2012, she performed The Abbey Road Sessions version of the song on BBC Proms in the Park. She performed the song at Royal Windsor Horse Show in the grounds of Windsor Castle, during a special event celebrating the 90th birthday of Queen Elizabeth II in 2016.

== Formats and track listings ==
- Australian and New Zealand CD maxi-single
1. "I Believe in You" (original version) – 3:22
2. "B.P.M." – 4:05
3. "I Believe in You" (Mylo vocal mix) – 6:03
4. "I Believe in You" (Skylark mix) – 7:57
5. "I Believe in You" (video)
- UK and European CD single
1. "I Believe in You" (original version) – 3:21
2. "B.P.M." – 4:04
- UK and European CD maxi-single
1. "I Believe in You" (original version) – 3:21
2. "I Believe in You" (Mylo vocal mix) – 6:02
3. "I Believe in You" (Skylark mix) – 7:56
4. "I Believe in You" (video)
- UK and European 12-inch picture disc

A1. "I Believe in You" (original version) – 3:21
B1. "I Believe in You" (Mylo dub) – 6:10
B2. "I Believe in You" (Skylark mix) – 7:56

- Digital EP
1. "I Believe in You" – 3:21
2. "I Believe in You (Mylo vocal) – 3:23
3. "I Believe in You (Skylark mix) – 7:57
4. "B.P.M." – 4:05

== Personnel ==
Personnel are lifted from the Ultimate Kylie liner notes.

- Kylie Minogue – writing, vocals
- Jake Shears – writing, production
- Babydaddy – writing, production
- Mark Aubrey – engineering
- Jeremy Wheatly – mixing
- Ashley Phase – mastering

== Charts ==
=== Weekly charts ===
Weekly chart performance for "I Believe in You"
Chart (2004–2005)	Peak position
Australia (ARIA)	6
Australian Dance (ARIA)	2
Austria (Ö3 Austria Top 40)	4
Belgium (Ultratop 50 Flanders)	13
Belgium (Ultratop 50 Wallonia)	20
Belgium Dance (Ultratop Flanders)	5
CIS Airplay (TopHit)	22
Denmark (Tracklisten)	2
Europe (Eurochart Hot 100)	2
Finland (Suomen virallinen lista)	20
France (SNEP)	35
Germany (GfK)	12
Greece (IFPI)	6
Hungary (Rádiós Top 40)	5
Iceland (Tónlist)	5
Ireland (IRMA)	9
Italy (FIMI)	11
Netherlands (Dutch Top 40)	10
Netherlands (Single Top 100)	14
New Zealand (Recorded Music NZ)	29
Norway (VG-lista)	13
Paraguay (Notimex)	2
Romania (Romanian Top 100)	1
Russia Airplay (TopHit)	20
Scottish Singles Sales (Official Charts)	2
Spain (Promusicae)	5
Sweden (Sverigetopplistan)	16
Switzerland (Schweizer Hitparade)	6
UK Singles (Official Charts)	2
US Dance Club Songs (Billboard)	3
US Dance Airplay (Billboard)	4

=== Year-end charts ===
2004 year-end chart performance for "I Believe in You"
Chart (2004)	Position
Australian Dance (ARIA)	18
CIS Airplay (TopHit)	122
Russia Airplay (TopHit)	68
UK Singles (OCC)	63

2005 year-end chart performance for "I Believe in You"
Chart (2005)	Position
Austria (Ö3 Austria Top 40)	59
Europe (Eurochart Hot 100)	34
Germany (Media Control GfK)	75
Hungary (Rádiós Top 40)	85
Italy (FIMI)	68
Netherlands (Dutch Top 40)	93
Romania (Romanian Top 100)	7
Switzerland (Schweizer Hitparade)	61
US Hot Dance Airplay (Billboard)	13

== Certifications and sales ==
Certifications and sales for "I Believe in You"
Region	Certification	Certified units/sales
Australia (ARIA)	Gold	35,000^{^}
United Kingdom (BPI)	Silver	200,000^{‡}
^{^} Shipments figures based on certification alone.^{‡} Sales+streaming figures based on certification alone.

== Release history ==
Release dates and formats for "I Believe in You"
Region	Date	Format	Label	Ref.
Australia	29 November 2004	CD	Festival Mushroom	
Germany	6 December 2004	CD	Parlophone	
United Kingdom	6 December 2004	12-inch vinyl; CD	Parlophone	

== In popular culture ==
In 2014, the version of "I Believe in You" from Minogue's album The Abbey Road Sessions was used in a television advertisement for the British building society Nationwide.

== See also ==
- List of Romanian Top 100 number ones of the 2000s
