= Where the Wild Roses Grow =

1995 single by Nick Cave and the Bad Seeds and Kylie Minogue

Single by Nick Cave and the Bad Seeds and Kylie Minogue

from the album Murder Ballads
- B-side: "The Ballad of Robert Moore & Betty Coltrane"; "The Willow Garden"
- Released: 2 October 1995
- Studio: Atlantis, Sing Sing, Metropolis (Melbourne, Australia); Wessex (London, England)
- Genre: Pop rock; post-punk; gothic rock; punk blues; murder ballad
- Length: 3:57
- Label: Mute
- Songwriter: Nick Cave
- Producers: Tony Cohen; Victor Van Vugt

Nick Cave and the Bad Seeds singles chronology
"Red Right Hand" (1994)	"Where the Wild Roses Grow" (1995)	"Henry Lee" (1996)

Kylie Minogue singles chronology
"Put Yourself in My Place" (1994)	"Where the Wild Roses Grow" (1995)	"Some Kind of Bliss" (1997)

Music video
- "Where the Wild Roses Grow" on YouTube

"Where the Wild Roses Grow" is a song by Australian rock band Nick Cave and the Bad Seeds and pop singer Kylie Minogue. Released in October 1995 by Mute Records, the murder ballad is the fifth song and lead single from the band's ninth studio album, Murder Ballads (1996). It was written by the band's frontman, Nick Cave and produced by Tony Cohen and Victor Van Vugt. The accompanying music video was directed by Rocky Schenck.

The song received a positive reception from music critics and became the band's most successful single worldwide, reaching No. 3 in Norway, the top five in Australia and Israel, and the top twenty in the United Kingdom, Ireland, Germany and New Zealand. It also received a limited promotional release in the United States. The song was certified gold in Germany in 1996 for 250,000 copies sold, despite never reaching the top ten in that country. It charted again at the bottom of the German Top 100 in 2008 because of digital downloads after it was used in a soap opera. "Where the Wild Roses Grow" was also certified gold in Australia for selling 50,000 copies.

Cave was inspired to write "Where the Wild Roses Grow" after listening to the traditional song "Down in the Willow Garden", a tale of a man courting a woman and killing her while they are out together. Cave arranged this tale as the second of two B-sides, "The Ballad of Robert Moore & Betty Coltrane" / "The Willow Garden", released on the CD-Maxi single version.

Although the song does not feature on a Minogue studio album, it can be found on her compilations Hits +, Greatest Hits 1987–1999, Ultimate Kylie, The Abbey Road Sessions and Step Back in Time: The Definitive Collection. Minogue performed a chorus of the song during her Showgirl: The Greatest Hits and Showgirl: The Homecoming tours.

It reached number eight in Triple J's Hottest 100 in 1995. In 2012, NME listed the song in their 100 Best Songs of the 1990s list at number 35, while in 2014, NME placed it at number 378 on their list of the 500 Greatest Songs of All Time list.

== Background ==
Cave described writing the song:

"Where The Wild Roses Grow" was written very much with Kylie in mind. I'd wanted to write a song for Kylie for many years. I had a quiet obsession with her for about six years. I wrote several songs for her, none of which I felt was appropriate to give her. It was only when I wrote this song, which is a dialogue between a killer and his victim, that I thought finally I'd written the right song for Kylie to sing. I sent the song to her and she replied the next day.

— Nick Cave, quoted in Molly Meldrum presents 50 Years of Rock in Australia (2007)

A CD of the track—which had Blixa Bargeld singing Minogue's lines—was sent to Minogue's parents' house (as she was staying there at the time) prior to her recording the song. This Bargeld duet track was featured on Nick Cave and the Bad Seeds B Sides and Rarities on disc 2, track 12, released in 2005.

Nick Cave and the Bad Seeds and Kylie Minogue first performed the song publicly on 4 August 1995 in Cork, Ireland.

== Composition ==
According to the sheet music edition published by SheetMusicNow.com, "Where The Wild Roses Grow" is written in the compound time signature of 6/8 and is set in the key signature of G minor at a tempo of 56 beats per minute.

== Critical reception ==
Larry Flick from Billboard magazine wrote, "This is not a joke. Not since Debbie Gibson contributed backing vocals on the Circle Jerks's cover of the Soft Boys' 'I Wanna Destroy You' has there been such an odd collaboration of musical talent. Australia's queen of bubble-gum pop meets the underground art rock of Nick Cave on this moody track. Forget 'Loco-Motion': Minogue carries her own as Cave catapults his vocals into a moody pit of musical melancholy and lyrical despair. Brilliant." Another Billboard editor, Paul Verna, complimented it as a "ghostly beautiful duet". James Masterton for Dotmusic described the song as "a gorgeous, mellow 1940s-sounding ballad." Simon Price from Melody Maker named it Single of the Week, writing, "Cave and Kylie isn't actually that strange. After all, Minogue, who, judging by her vocals, may possibly own a copy of this year's Mercury Awards winner, has nothing to lose. [...] You know exactly what this sounds like. Morricone, Leone, Peckinpah, blah blah. Cut to the final reel, though, and even I'm shocked. Down by the river, "He" kneels above "Her" with a rock in his fist, and calmy batters her brains out, whispering ...all beauty must die..."

Pan-European magazine Music & Media commented, "Written especially for Minogue, the diminutive singer forms an unlikely but stunning combination with Cave. It is a brooding and haunting song that finds Cave in a sombre, Leonard Cohen-type mood against Minogue's declaring diction. The tension gradually builds up as each tells their version of a tale of murder." A reviewer from Music Week gave it a score of four out of five, adding, "Nick croons while Kylie purrs in this folksy foretaste of the album of murder ballads". Sylvia Patterson from NME declared it as a "riverside melodrama duet of violin wobbles and breathy husks". She wrote, "Croaky, in a very real sense. A tense, ghostly, Grimm's fairytale wherein the midget fights gamely to keep her voice tied to the whispering reeds while the nutter secures his to the coal bunker at the core of the earth. And, possibly because they're both undeniably unhinged, it's... quite good." In December 1995, NME ranked "Where the Wild Roses Grow" number 27 in their list of "NME Writers' Top 50 Singles of 1995". Gina Morris from Select noted, "A meeting of cool and populist, should be huge." Siân Pattenden from Smash Hits gave the song two out of five, writing, "This is a dull, lifeless (ha, ha) record with a dreamy chorus and boring end. She was better off duetting with Jason. At least he didn't kill her at the song's end."

In her show on German ARD national public television, German comedian Carolin Kebekus criticized the song as inappropriately romanticizing femicide.

== Music video ==
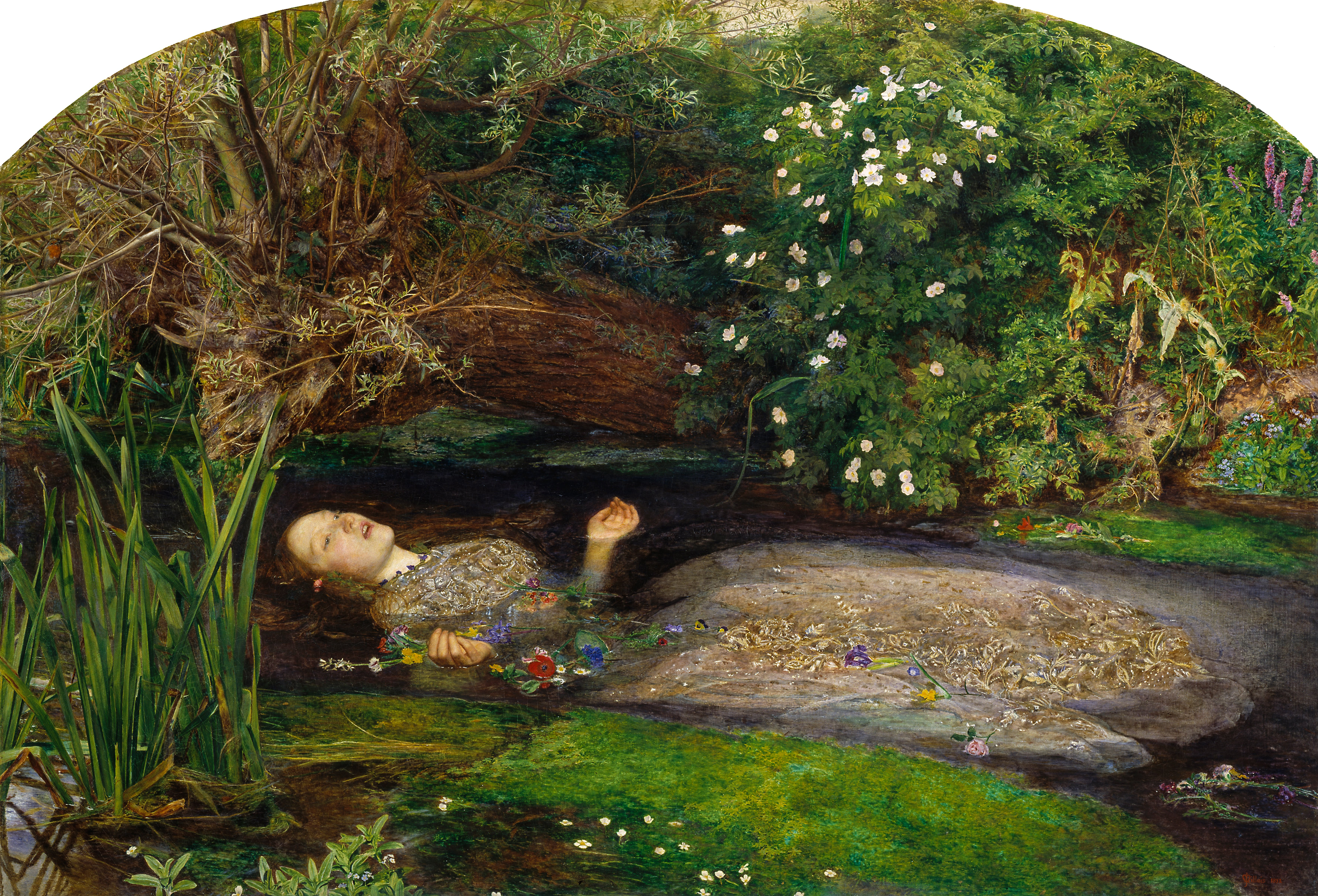
The painting Ophelia by John Everett Millais inspired scenes within the music video.

The music video for "Where the Wild Roses Grow", commissioned by Emma Davies for Mute Records, shot by American photographer and music video director Rocky Schenck and produced by Nick Verden for Atlas Films, shows Kylie Minogue in character, apparently having been murdered by Nick Cave's character. We see her in ghost-like form and also in a river in a pose reminiscent of Millais's painting Ophelia (1851–52). The video ends with Cave's character putting a rose in Minogue's mouth and closing her eyelids.

== Live performances ==
Cave and Minogue performed the song together live on stage in London on 3 June 2018 when Kylie made a surprise appearance during the Nick Cave and the Bad Seeds set at All Points East festival.

Minogue performed the song on the following concert tours:

- Showgirl: The Greatest Hits Tour (performed as a medley with "Red Blooded Woman")
- Showgirl: The Homecoming Tour (performed as a medley with "Red Blooded Woman")
- For You, for Me (performed as a medley with "Red Blooded Woman")
- Golden Tour (where Kylie presents a member of the audience with a single red rose)
- Tension Tour (where Kylie also presents a member of the audience with a rose)

Minogue appeared as a surprise guest at Coldplay's Enmore Theatre show in Sydney, Australia, on 19 June 2014, where they performed the song as a duet. Cave and Minogue performed the song at the Glastonbury Festival 2019.

Nick Cave and The Bad Seeds did live performances of this song featuring a duet between Nick Cave and Blixa Bargeld from the mid to late 90s. Many of the occasions were captured on video by fans and can be seen on video media websites.

Sample of "Where the Wild Roses Grow"

== Other version ==
A guide track with the Bad Seeds guitarist, Blixa Bargeld, singing Kylie Minogue's vocal part was released on the compilation B-Sides & Rarities.

== Awards ==
- 1996 ARIA Awards: 'Single of the Year', 'Song of the Year' & 'Best Pop Release'.

== Formats and track listings ==
- Australian CD and cassette single; UK CD single (D1188; C 1188; CDMUTE 185)
1. "Where the Wild Roses Grow" (Cave) – 3:58
2. "The Ballad of Robert Moore & Betty Coltrane" (Cave) – 3:34
3. "The Willow Garden" (traditional) – 3:57
- UK 7-inch and cassette single (MUTE 185; CMUTE 185)
1. "Where the Wild Roses Grow" (Cave) – 3:58
2. "The Ballad of Robert Moore & Betty Coltrane" (Cave) – 3:34

== Charts ==
=== Weekly charts ===
Chart (1995–1996)	Peak position
Australia (ARIA)	2
Austria (Ö3 Austria Top 40)	4
Belgium (Ultratop 50 Flanders)	3
Belgium (Ultratop 50 Wallonia)	8
Denmark (IFPI)	9
Europe (Eurochart Hot 100)	8
Europe (European Hit Radio)	25
Finland (Suomen virallinen lista)	5
France (SNEP)	37
Germany (GfK)	12
Iceland (Íslenski Listinn Topp 40)	3
Ireland (IRMA)	6
Israel (Israeli Singles Chart)	2
Netherlands (Dutch Top 40)	9
Netherlands (Single Top 100)	9
New Zealand (Recorded Music NZ)	11
Norway (VG-lista)	3
Scottish Singles Sales (Official Charts)	9
Sweden (Sverigetopplistan)	3
Switzerland (Schweizer Hitparade)	11
UK Singles (Official Charts)	11
UK Indie (Music Week)	1

=== Year-end charts ===
Chart (1995)	Rank
Australia (ARIA)	41
Belgium (Ultratop 50 Flanders)	27
Belgium (Ultratop 50 Wallonia)	61
Europe (Eurochart Hot 100)	59
Israel (Israeli Singles Chart)	17
Latvia (Latvijas Top 50)	89
Netherlands (Dutch Top 40)	94
Netherlands (Single Top 100)	76
Sweden (Topplistan)	13

Chart (1996)	Rank
Austria (Ö3 Austria Top 40)	24
Europe (Eurochart Hot 100)	64
Germany (Media Control)	65
Iceland (Íslenski Listinn Topp 40)	61

== Certifications ==
Region	Certification	Certified units/sales
Australia (ARIA)	Gold	35,000^{^}
Germany (BVMI)	Gold	250,000^{^}
^{^} Shipments figures based on certification alone.
