= Ark Recordings =

- Founded: 2005
- Founder: Jamie Davis & Russell Warby
- Distributor(s): PIAS Entertainment Group
- Genre: Indie
- Country of origin: UK

Ark Recordings is a London-based independent record label, run by Jamie Davis (of Transcopic Records) and Russell Warby (VP of WME Agency UK, Music Power 1001).

The label was launched in 2005 after Transcopic Records went on a hiatus, and Davis joined forces with Warby to create a cross-Atlantic signings imprint. It has since had releases by UK and international acts including Jamaican reggae artist Little Roy, New York based Alberta Cross, Turbo Fruits (feat. Be Your Own Pet's Jonas Stein), Josephine, Sparkadia, Tacks The Boy Disaster, Magic Wands and Liverpool's The 747s.

Releases such as Josphine's "A Freak A" and Little Roy's Nirvana cover of "Sliver" enjoyed extensive UK radio coverage and press and online coverage. The label has also had mentions on BBC Radio 2 and BBC 6 Music by Steve Lamacq and Nemone.

In May 2012, Ark Recordings merged with Irish independent label Rubyworks Records.

== Releases ==
ARK001 – The 747s : Equilibrium / Set Me Free, 7"/CD/DL single (2006)
ARK002 – The 747s : Night & Day, 7"/CD/DL single (2006)
ARK003 – The 747s : Zampano, CD/ DL Album (2006)
ARK004 – The 747s : Death of a Star, 7"/CD/DL single (2006)
ARK005 – The 747s : Rainkiss, DL single (2006)
ARK006 – Turbo Fruits : Turbo Fruits, CD/DL Album (2007)
ARK007 – Turbo Fruits : Volcano, 7" Ltd Edition/DL single (2007)
ARK008 – Tacks, The Boy Disaster : Oh, Beatrice EP, CD/DL Mini-Album (2007)
ARK009 – Sparkadia : Animals, DL single (2007)
ARK010 – Sparkadia : Too Much To Do, DL single (2008)
ARK011 – Sparkadia : Postcards, CD/DL Album (2008)
ARK012 – Magic Wands : Teenage Love, DL single (2008)
ARK013 – Magic Wands : Black Magic, 7"/DL single (2008)
ARK014 – Sparkadia : Morning Light, DL single (2008)
ARK015 – Alberta Cross : Thief and the Heartbreaker EP, CD/DL Mini-Album (2008)
ARK016 – Alberta Cross : Broken Side of Time, CD/LP/DL Album (2009)
ARK017 – Alberta Cross : ATX, DL single (2009)
ARK018 – Turbo Fruits : Echo Kid, CD/DL Album (2009)
ARK020 – Turbo Fruits : Get Up Get on Down EP, CD/DL (2010)
ARK021 – Josephine : I Think It Was Love Digital EP, DL (2010)
ARK022 – Josephine : A Freak A EP, DL (2010)
ARK023 – Little Roy : Sliver/Dive, 7"/DL (2011)
ARK024 – Little Roy : Battle For Seattle, CD/DL/LP album (2011)
ARK025 – Little Roy : Come As You Are, 7"/DL single (2011)
ARK026 – Alberta Cross : Rolling Thunder EP, USA only (2011)
ARK027 – Little Roy : Lithium (Radio edit), DL single (2011)
ARK028 – Alberta Cross : Songs of Patience, CD/DL/LP album (2012)
ARK029 – Alberta Cross : Magnolia (Radio edit), DL single (2012)
ARK030 – Josephine : Portrait, CD/DL/LP album (2012)
ARK031 – Josephine : What A Day, DL single (2012)
ARK032 – Alberta Cross : Laydown, DL/7" single (2012)
ARK033 – Deap Vally : Gonna Make My Own Money, 7"/DL single (2012)

== Current artists ==
- Alberta Cross
- Deap Vally
- Josephine
- Little Roy

== Previous artists ==
- Magic Wands
- The 747s
- Tacks The Boy Disaster
- Sparkadia
