= Sparkadia =

Australian band

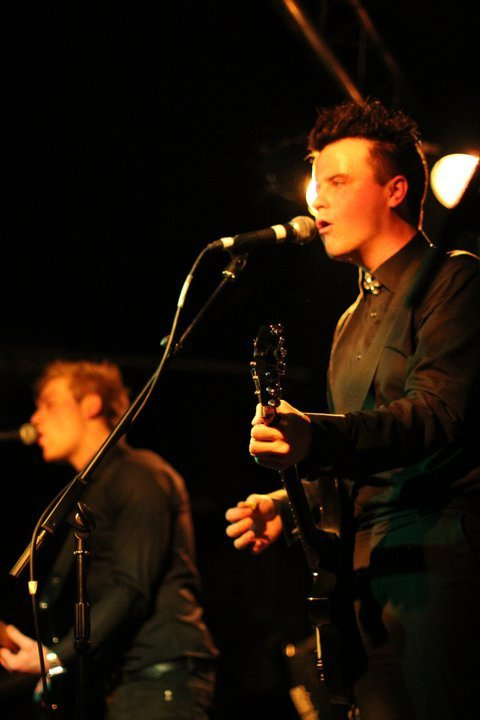

Background information
- Origin: Sydney, New South Wales, Australia
- Genres: Alternative rock, indie rock
- Years active: 2004–2012
- Labels: Boundary/Inertia; Ivy League; Ark Recordings
- Past members: Alexander Burnett; David Hall; Josephine Ayling; Nick Rabone; Tiffany Preece; Adam Foreman
- Website: sparkadia.com.au

Sparkadia was an Australian rock band, formed in Sydney in 2004. They were originally known as The Spark. The band was formed by Alexander Burnett (vocals, guitar) and Dave Hall (drums), and eventually expanded with the addition of Nick Rabone (bass) and Josephine Ayling (keyboards, guitar, vocals) in 2006. In 2008 Ayling was replaced by Tiffany Preece on guitars and vocals. By 2009 Sparkadia was Burnett's solo project. Sparkadia released two studio albums, Postcards (31 May 2008) and The Great Impression (18 March 2011).

== Band history ==
=== 2004–2007: Formation and Things Behind the Sun ===
Sparkadia formed as a duo in 2004 in Sydney by Alexander Burnett on lead vocals and David Hall on drums.

On 17 February 2007 Sparkadia released their debut extended play titled, Things Behind the Sun, on Boundary Sounds through Inertia Records, which peaked in the ARIA Singles Chart top 100 for four weeks in March–April.

In 2007, Sparkadia supported Elbow on their tour of Australia following the release of the Things Behind the Sun EP. This was followed by a tour of the UK that included supporting Irish band The Thrills, whom they were to support again the following year on their Australian tour.

=== 2008–2009: Postcards ===
In May 2008, the band released "Too Much to Do", the second single from their debut studio album. "Too Much to Do" reached No. 11 on the ARIA Hitseekers Singles Chart.

Their first studio album, Postcards, was released on 31 May 2008 and reached number 23 in the ARIA Albums Chart. For the album the line-up were Ayling, Burnett, Hall and Rabone. Soon after Ayling was replaced by Tiffany Preece on guitars and vocals. However, by 2009 Sparkadia had become Burnett's solo project; according to Burnett: Hall had "moved onto other things", Preece had left to have a baby, and Rabone went to India.

In 2008, Sparkadia toured with Jimmy Eat World on their European tour. This was followed by shows with Vampire Weekend, as well as their own headline shows across the UK and Europe.

In 2009, the band recorded a cover of "This Boy's in Love" by The Presets for Triple J's Like a Version Volume 5.

In 2009, Sparkadia toured Australia as part of the Big Day Out, before embarking on a string of sold-out shows across Australia before amicably parting ways as a four piece.

=== 2010–2011: The Great Impression ===
In September 2010 Sparkadia issued the next single, "Talking Like I'm Falling Down Stairs", which peaked in the top 100. Another single, "China", was issued in March 2011. Burnett, as Sparkadia, had moved to London to work on the second album in mid-January 2010.

The Great Impression was issued on 18 March 2011, which reached number 8 on the ARIA Albums Chart. On 20 March it was the week's "feature album" on national youth radio Triple J.

In March 2011, Burnett was the featured cover star for Sydney music magazine The Drum, with the tagline "Sparkadia I'll Do It Myself". The feature photo shoot was conducted by award winning music photographer Daniel Boud.

=== 2012–present: Solo work ===
Following Sparkadia's The Great Impression, Burnett joined the Nick Cave Straight To You concert series organised by Triple J. He performed on many of the songs on the tour including his own rendition of The Boys Next Door's "Shivers", and the duet "Where the Wild Roses Grow" with Lanie Lane. The subsequent live recording/DVD went on to win an ARIA Award at the ARIA Music Awards of 2012.

From December 2012, Burnett has largely worked as a songwriter. He has collaborated and co-written tracks for various artists including DJ Snake, Alison Wonderland, Kaiser Chiefs, Digitalism, George Maple, Flight Facilities, Elizabeth Rose, Dan Sultan, Thelma Plum, Tieks, LDRU, Rationale and more.

Burnett also had a deep house project called Antony & Cleopatra, which was based in London. It is a duo with Anita Blay (AKA CocknBullKid), whom Burnett met in London in 2014 during a pop writing session. In 2016, Burnett claimed to be working on the third Sparkadia album. As of August 2024, however, no further updates have been given regarding the project.

== Members ==
- Alexander Burnett – lead vocals, guitar, keyboards (2004–present)
- David Hall – drums (2004–2009)
- Josephine Ayling – guitar, keyboards, vocals (2006–2008)
- Nick Rabone – bass guitar (2006–2009)
- Tiffany Preece – guitars, vocals (2008–2009)

== Discography ==
=== Studio albums ===
List of studio albums, with selected chart positions
Title	Album details	Peak chart positions
Title	Album details	AUS
Postcards	Released: June 2008; Label: Ivy League (IVY063); Format: CD, LP, Download	23
The Great Impression	Released: 18 March 2011; Label: Ivy League (IVY105); Format: CD	8

=== Extended plays ===
List of extended plays, with selected chart positions
Title	EP details	Peak chart positions
Title	EP details	AUS
Things Behind the Sun	Released: 17 February 2007; Label: Boundary Sounds (BS0003); Format: CD, LP, Download	83

=== Single ===
List of singles, with year released, selected chart positions, and album shown
Title	Year	Peak chart positions	Album
Title	Year	AUS	Album
"Morning Light"	2007	—	Things Behind the Sun
"Animals"	2007	—	Postcards
"Too Much to Do"	2008	—	Postcards
"Jealousy"	2008	—	Postcards
"Talking Like I'm Falling Down Stairs"	2010	75	The Great Impression
"China"	2011	81	The Great Impression
"Mary"	2011	—	The Great Impression
"Love Less Love"	2011	—	The Great Impression
