= Lights Camera Action (Kylie Minogue song) =

2024 single by Kylie Minogue

Single by Kylie Minogue

from the album Tension II
- Released: 27 September 2024
- Genre: Electronic; club; Eurodance
- Length: 2:42
- Label: Darenote; BMG
- Songwriters: Lewis Thompson; Ina Wroldsen; Kylie Minogue
- Producers: Lewis Thompson; Adria Garcia

Kylie Minogue singles chronology
"Edge of Saturday Night" (2024)	"Lights Camera Action" (2024)	"Someone for Me" (YouNotUs remix) (2025)

Music video
- "Lights Camera Action" on YouTube

"Lights Camera Action" is a song by Australian singer Kylie Minogue. It was released on 27 September 2024, by BMG and Minogue's company Darenote, and distributed in digital, streaming, and physical formats. It is the lead single from Minogue's seventeenth studio album, Tension II (2024), and was written by her, Ina Wroldsen, and producer Lewis Thompson, with additional production by Adria Garcia.

The song, loosely inspired by the euphoric sound and nightclub aesthetic of Minogue's previous album, Tension (2023), is an uptempo electronic track with club and Eurodance influences. Lyrically, the song talks about living a glamorous lifestyle. Music critics praised "Lights Camera Action" for its high energy, overall production and sound, and Minogue's performance. Its inclusion on the parent album drew positive feedback from critics.

Commercially, the song reached component charts in Australia, Germany, Italy, Latvia, Lithuania, New Zealand, the United Kingdom, and the United States. Sophie Muller directed the music video, which features Minogue in various costumes and performing the song on a staged set in Budapest, Hungary, and received positive feedback from critics.

Channel 9 used the song to promote 2025 Australian Open coverage. Sony Sports Network also used the song for the knockout phase of 2024–25 UEFA Champions League coverage.

== Background and release ==
Following the critical and commercial success of Minogue's sixteenth studio album Tension, Variety announced that the album would be repackaged and released in 2024. The following month, Minogue hinted at working on new music during interviews at the 66th Annual Grammy Awards, where she won the inaugural Grammy Award for Best Pop Dance Recording for her single "Padam Padam". During the same year, she collaborated on several tracks, including "Dance Alone" with Australian singer Sia, "Midnight Ride" with South African singer Orville Peck and American DJ Diplo, "My Oh My" with American singer Bebe Rexha and Swedish artist Tove Lo, and "Edge of Saturday Night" with American DJ The Blessed Madonna.

On 19 September, Minogue teased an announcement on social media, and one day later, she revealed her seventeenth studio album, Tension II, its release formats, her Tension Tour, and the album's lead single "Lights Camera Action". On 21 September, she teased the track at a listening party alongside the rest of the material from Tension II. Additionally, Minogue shared a short snippet of the track and its cover art; the artwork is a still from the single's music video, which was filmed in Budapest, Hungary. On 27 September, BMG and Minogue's company Darenote released the single in digital and streaming formats. The same day, a digital EP featuring remixes by Confidence Man, Zach Witness, and Jaconda was released, including the original and extended mix. On 3 October, Minogue announced the single's release on three physical formats, which would be shipped from 17 October.

== Composition ==
"It’s quite hypnotic. It’s lots of fun, and you will probably just be throwing in ‘Lights Camera Action’ to general parlance from now."

— Minogue describing "Lights Camera Action".

"Lights Camera Action" was written by Minogue, Ina Wroldsen and its producer Lewis Thompson. Minogue served as the song's vocal engineer, while Wroldsen provided additional background vocals and Thompson handled the programming and instrumentation. Minogue teased the song with Vogue Singapore saying, "One of the writers that wrote 'Padam Padam' worked on this track so there’s definitely a link. When I heard the demo, I just thought it was a fun song and what’s important was this tension and hold that draws you in. It draws and then it drops and it’s a pretty solid drop." Regarding the song's vibe, Minogue stated "It’s quite hypnotic. It’s lots of fun, and you will probably just be throwing in ‘Lights Camera Action’ to general parlance from now." Furthermore, she stated to NME that the song follows "that similar kind of hypnotic quality" that was similar to her single "Padam Padam", and felt the lyric "Lights camera action, that’s it" was a bit "catchphrase-y".

Musically, it is a club-inspired electronic and Eurodance track with "raving synths" and "hard strutting beats" that lasts two minutes and 42 seconds. Shore Fire Media wrote that the song "captures the carefree spirit of the nightclub and continues the euphoric, electronic sound of previous album Tension". Billboard writer Jessica Lynch compared "Lights Camera Action" to the sounds of Tension, writing that Minogue dives "deeper into the electronic world, continuing the nightclub-inspired sound that made her last album Tension a global hit." Lynch also described the track as "packed with high-energy beats fit for the dance floor." Rolling Stone editor Conor Lochrie expressed a similar sentiment, comparing it to the sounds of Tension and believing it "captures the carefree spirit of the nightclub". Similarly, Ky Stewart of Junkee felt the song was "another homage to Kylie's favourite place: the dance floor", while also noting that the track "carries the dance-electronic atmosphere from Tension but it stands strong on its own. Pushing Kylie deeper into the genre, ushering her into yet another era."

Classic Pop writer Dan Biggane described it as a "high energy club-inspired track" that follows Minogue's dance-oriented contribution to "Edge of Saturday Night". Alim Kheraj of Attitude compared it to Minogue's single "Timebomb" (2012), writing that it "feels more warehouse rave than Tension's chintzy gay club" and that its "thick and rubbery electronics whir under strutting beats and campy lyrics". According to Euphoria writer Nmesoma Okechukwu, the song's lyrics discuss Minogue's glamorous life "in a braggadocio kind of way". Mandy Rogers, writing for EQ Music, thought the vibe and sound of "Lights Camera Action" were similar to the runway segments on the American reality competition show RuPaul's Drag Race. Talia M. Wilson of Riff thought its sound differed from Minogue's electro-pop and dance sound, saying it "sounds more like the newer artists who listened to her music growing up", citing the modern dance composition.

== Critical reception ==
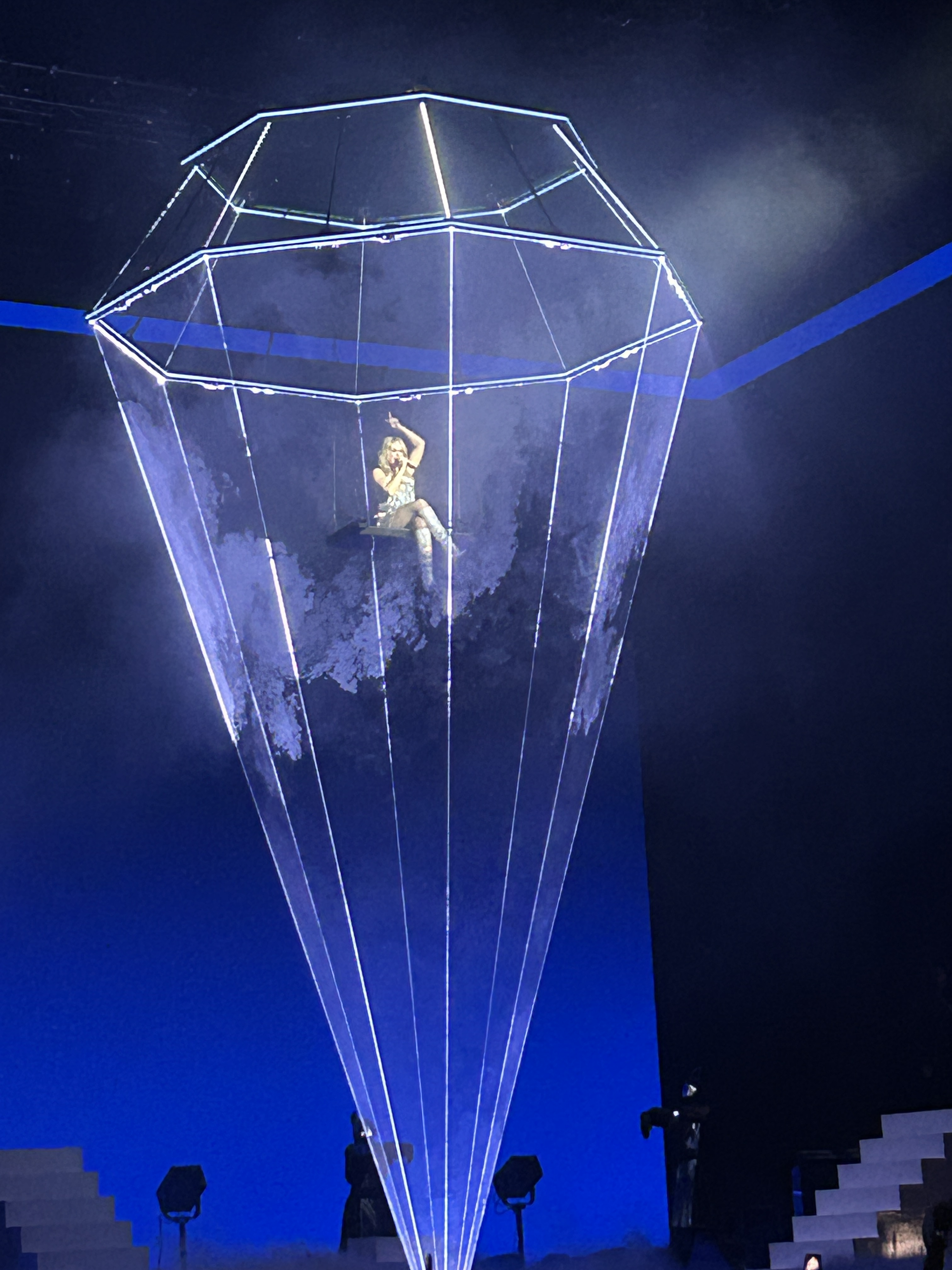
Minogue performing the song during her Tension Tour

Upon release, "Lights Camera Action" received largely positive reviews from music critics. Lynch of Billboard praised the song, saying it "serves as a celebration of all things glamorous". Hit Channel also praised Minogue, saying she "offers a pulsating pop anthem that showcases Kylie's signature flair" and that the track is "dynamic." Steward of Junkee was positive, saying its "filled with the fun, witty, and carefree lyrics we know and love Kylie for." George Griffiths of Official Charts Company labelled the song an "addictive pop bop", whereas Clash editor Robin Murray described it as a "unapologetic dancefloor burner" after noting its energy. Biggane of Classic Pop felt the track "captures the carefree spirit of the nightclub and continues the euphoric, electronic sound of previous album Tension." Alim Kheraj of Attitude dubbed it "another instant queer club classic". Okechukwu of Euphoria described it as a "hot dance song that might see you waving your hands in the air like you just do not care" and believes that she "may not be 'cool as sorbet' this time around, but that doesn't mean she's lost her bite." Rogers of EQ Music praised Minogue's "dominatrix"-like qualities in the song and emphasized her efforts to provide quality work for her gay fan base, including "new gag-worthy, pop realness and equally music videos exuding on-point eleganza." Rogers described Minogue's vocals as "cool and confident", and stated that the song was their favorite among Tension II's pre-release singles.

Its inclusion in Tension II received positive reviews. Helen Brown of The Independent dubbed the song a "banger of an opener" to Tension II, while Claire Dunton of The Music called it an "instant classic with the pace, synth, and lyrics giving it quintessential Kylie." Quentin Harrison of The Line of Best Fit described it as the album's "kinetic opener", yielding "her own unique clubland sound", while Robin Murray of Clash called it a "deliciously frothy opener". According to Neil Z. Yeung of AllMusic, the track is a "banger" and "pounding" and is one of the album's standouts. Puah Ziwei of NME praised the track's "diva-driven energy" and said its lyrics were "delicious as it is exciting". Joe Muggs of The Arts Desk had a mixed reaction, stating that the track "sounds purpose-written to be a novelty 'bit' for a light entertainment show".

== Commercial performance ==
"Lights Camera Action" debuted at number 35 on the Midweek Singles Chart in the United Kingdom, but eventually opened at number 59 on the UK Singles Chart. Furthermore, it debuted at number one on the Single Sales and Single Downloads charts, number 10 on the Independent Singles chart, and number 16 on the Dance Singles chart. In Australia, it did not make the ARIA top 100 singles chart but debuted at number 15 on the Australian Artist Singles chart. In New Zealand, it reached number 16 on the Hot Singles chart.

== Music video ==
A black-and-white still of Minogue from the music video

The music video to "Lights Camera Action" was filmed by British filmmaker and long-time collaborator Sophie Muller. It was filmed in Budapest, Hungary, and features Minogue in various guises on a staged film set. It begins with a black-and-white shot of Minogue in an office-like setting in front of a map, similar to the snippet clip she shared on social media before the song's release. Additional scenes follow, including her posing in front of a photographer (played by Minogue), getting her makeup done with curlers in front of a mirror with additional personnel around her, a tracking shot of her singing the song, and her wearing a black-and-yellow dress with confetti, caution tape, and a stuntman in the background. It concludes with Minogue in a cinema, watching a black-and-white shot of herself.

The music video and visualisers for each track from the EP premiered on Minogue's YouTube channel on 28 September, while a lyric video was released on 3 October. Kheraj of Attitude felt the video "captures the high energy spirit of the song," while Alan Pedder of The Needle Drop described it as "dazzling". Clash writer Murrah thought it was a "clever flip on spy film tropes". Promonews writer Rob Ulitski praised Muller's video direction and Minogue's performance, saying that the singer "stands imperiously unfazed and miraculously unscathed amidst total windblown chaos." Ulitski concluded their review by saying, "Pure showbiz, brilliantly done. Marvellous."

== Track listings ==
- 7-inch vinyl and cassette single
1. "Lights Camera Action" – 2:42
2. "Lights Camera Action" (extended mix) – 3:55
- Digital download, streaming and CD maxi-single
1. "Lights Camera Action" – 2:42
2. "Lights Camera Action" (extended mix) – 3:55
3. "Lights Camera Action" (Confidence Man remix) – 4:27
4. "Lights Camera Action" (Zach Witness remix) – 4:02
5. "Lights Camera Action" (Jaconda remix) – 2:50

== Credits and personnel ==
Personnel

- Kylie Minogue – composer, songwriter, vocal engineer
- Ina Wroldsen – background vocals, songwriter
- Lewis Thompson – composer, bass, drums, programmer, producer, synths
- Dick Beetham – engineer
- Guy Massey – engineer
- Adria Garcia – additional producer

== Charts ==
=== Weekly charts ===
Weekly chart performance for "Lights Camera Action"
Chart (2024–2025)	Peak position
Australian Artist Singles (ARIA)	15
Australia Independent (AIR)	1
Belarus Airplay (TopHit)	6
CIS Airplay (TopHit)	7
Ecuador Anglo (Monitor Latino)	13
Germany Download (GfK)	17
Italy Independent (Radiomonitor)	19
Japan Hot Overseas (Billboard Japan)	19
Kazakhstan Airplay (TopHit)	4
Latvia Airplay (TopHit)	9
Lithuania Airplay (TopHit)	31
Moldova Airplay (TopHit)	48
New Zealand Hot Singles (RMNZ)	16
Russia Airplay (TopHit)	4
UK Singles (Official Charts)	59
UK Dance (Official Charts)	16
UK Indie (Official Charts)	10
US Adult Pop Airplay (Billboard)	40
US Hot Dance/Electronic Songs (Billboard)	43
US Pop Airplay (Billboard)	36
US Dance Airplay (Billboard)	1

=== Monthly charts ===
Monthly chart performance for "Lights Camera Action"
Chart (2024–2025)	Peak position
Belarus Airplay (TopHit)	5
CIS Airplay (TopHit)	12
Kazakhstan Airplay (TopHit)	13
Latvia Airplay (TopHit)	24
Lithuania Airplay (TopHit)	69
Moldova Airplay (TopHit)	91
Russia Airplay (TopHit)	7

=== Year-end charts ===
Year-end chart performance for "Lights Camera Action"
Chart (2024)	Position
CIS Airplay (TopHit)	136
Russia Airplay (TopHit)	92
UK Vinyl Singles (OCC)	34

Year-end chart performance for "Lights Camera Action"
Chart (2025)	Position
Belarus Airplay (TopHit)	50
CIS Airplay (TopHit)	96
Kazakhstan Airplay (TopHit)	37
Latvia Airplay (TopHit)	159
Russia Airplay (TopHit)	72
UK Cassettes Singles (OCC)	13
US Dance/Mix Show Airplay Songs (Billboard)	17

== Release history ==
Release dates and formats for "Lights Camera Action"
Region	Date	Format	Label	Ref.
Various	27 September 2024	Digital download; streaming	Darenote; BMG	
Italy	4 October 2024	Radio airplay	BMG	
United States	8 October 2024	Contemporary hit radio; adult contemporary radio	BMG	
Various	18 October 2024	CD single; cassette	Darenote; BMG	
Various	8 November 2024	7" vinyl	Darenote; BMG	

== See also ==
- List of Billboard number-one dance songs of 2024
