= Someone for Me (Kylie Minogue song) =

2025 single by Kylie Minogue

- Cover of the YouNotUs version

Single by Kylie Minogue

from the album Tension II
- Released: 17 January 2025
- Recorded: 2024
- Studio: Infinite Disco (Los Angeles and Mexico)
- Genre: Dance-pop; nu-disco; house; Balearic beat
- Length: 2:35
- Label: BMG; Darenote
- Songwriters: Peter "Lostboy" Rycroft; Sarah Hudson; Brett "Leland" McLaughlin; Pablo Bowman; Kevin Hickey
- Producers: Lostboy; Zhone

Kylie Minogue singles chronology
| "Lights Camera Action" (2024) | "Someone for Me" (2025) | "Last Night I Dreamt I Fell in Love" (2025) |

Visualiser videos
- "Someone for Me" on YouTube; "Someone for Me" (YouNotUs remix) on YouTube

"Someone for Me" is a song by Australian singer Kylie Minogue. It is the third track on Minogue's seventeenth studio album, Tension II (2024), which was released on 18 October 2024 by BMG and Minogue's company Darenote. It was written by Peter "Lostboy" Rycroft, Sarah Hudson, Brett "Leland" McLaughlin, Pablo Bowman, and Kevin Hickey, with production by Lostboy and Zhone. Musically, the song is influenced by dance-pop, disco, and house music, with Ibiza and Balearic beats and instrumentation, and it discusses being happy for someone who is in a relationship while also wanting one for yourself.

Music critics praised the sound and production quality of "Someone for Me", deeming it a contender for a single for the album and a highlight to Tension II. Prior to being released as a single, it did appear on component charts in New Zealand. On the album's release day, Minogue uploaded a visualisation of the song to her YouTube channel. A new version of the song, with German production duo YouNotUs, was released as a single on 17 January 2025.

== Development and writing ==
Minogue had no intention of making a new record after the promotion for her sixteenth studio album, Tension (2023), and instead planned to expand it with new material. However, after evaluating several songs that did not appear on Tension and later having the opportunity to work with new producers and writers on Tension II, she decided to forego the planned repackage of Tension in favour of creating a new record. Minogue teased an announcement on her social media on 18 September 2024, and one day later, she revealed Tension II, its release formats, the lead single "Lights Camera Action", and the announcement of her Tension Tour; "Someone for Me" was listed on the record as the album's third track.

"Someone for Me" was sent to Minogue as a demo, and she recorded it herself in a hotel in Mexico; she is credited as the co-vocal engineer on the track. It was written by Peter "Lostboy" Rycroft, Sarah Hudson, Brett "Leland" McLaughlin, Pablo Bowman, and Kevin Hickey, with production by Lostboy and Zhone. In an interview with The Bert Show, Minogue stated that the track is "speaking of Ibiza, it feels like you're in Ibiza, there's a kind of a vocal part that feels Brasileiro, and lyrically I think its super, super clever and about being happy for your friend who's found their person but you would really like the same thing yourself." She also mentioned it as one of her favourite tracks from Tension II.

== Composition ==
"Someone for Me" lasts two minutes and 35 seconds, has a tempo of 120 beats per minute (BPM), is written in F minor, and uses a 4/4 time signature. Its musical influences include 1990s dance-pop, disco, and house music, as well as Ibiza and Balearic beats and instrumentation. According to Alim Kheraj of Attitude, the song "tricks you with airy Balearic guitars and schmaltzy opening lyrics before Kylie, her vocal clipped and robotic, becomes clouded with jealousy". Lauren Murphy of The Irish Times said it "adopts a Jessie Ware-style, soul-infused dance-pop approach", while Talia M. Wilson of Riff said it "offers a retro 1990s feel" like other tracks on the album. Pip Ellwood-Hughes of Entertainment Focus said it was "very computerised on the verses and a disco house beat providing the backing." According to Al Newstead of ABC News, its "pitch-bending synth so signature to Eurohouse music". Ky Stewart of Junkee felt that the lyrics "perfectly capture those feelings when you're watching your friend dance with someone but you're alone." It's not quite jealousy, because you're happy for them, but you can't help but feel a little sad", while Murphy described the lyrics as "cheekily".

== Reception and promotion ==
Music critics gave "Someone for Me" favourable reviews. Steward of Junkee described it as a "vulnerable song disguised in an infectious beat. But Kylie never sits in her sadness for long. She’s too busy dancing." Murphy of The Irish Times described it as "nifty," while Quentin Harrison of The Line of Best Fit mentioned it alongside album tracks "Shoula Left Ya" and "Midnight Run", praising her vocals on "Someone for Me." Similarly, Alexa Camp of Slant Magazine and Newstead of ABC News cited it as a standout among the record. Joan Summers of Paper mentioned it as one of their favourite newer recordings on the album. Despite highlighting the track's "sultry and confident" verses, Shaad D'Souza of The Observer felt it was "bulldozed by a plasticky Ibiza hits playlist drop." According to Puah Ziwei of NME, the song and "Shoulda Left Ya" made Minogue appear "dejected". In contrast, Pip Ellwood-Hughes of Entertainment Focus gave a mixed review. He described the song, along with album tracks "Good As Gone", "Diamonds", and "Dance to the Music", as a Disco reject, writing, "The frustration isn’t that the songs are bad, it’s that they’re just completely unremarkable. We’ve heard this from Kylie before and it’s disappointing to hear her retreading old ground." Nonetheless, he cited "Someone for Me" as the better of the bunch.

A visualiser was released to Minogue's YouTube channel on 18 October, the same day of its release by BMG and Darenote. An extended version of "Someone for Me" was added to the extended version of Tension II, which was available exclusively on Minogue's website. Despite not yet being released as a single, it peaked at number 36 on the New Zealand Hot Singles chart the same week that Tension II debuted on the albums chart.

== Track listing ==
Album version

1. "Someone for Me" – 2:35

Extended version

1. "Someone for Me" – 4:09

New version

1. "Someone for Me" (with YouNotUs) - 2:19

== Credits and personnel ==
Credits adapted from the liner notes of Tension II.

- Kylie Minogue – lead vocals, background vocals, vocal engineer
- Sarah Hudson - songwriter, composer, background vocals
- Peter "Lostboy" Rycroft - songwriter, composer, keyboards, drum programming, production, recording engineer
- Brett "Leland" McLaughlin - songwriter, composer,
- Pablo Bowman - songwriter, composer, background vocals
- Kevin Hickey - arrangement, songwriter, composer, guitar, programming
- Zhone - producer, recording engineer
- Guy Massey - mixing engineer
- Dick Beetham - mastering engineer

== Charts ==
=== Weekly charts ===
2024 chart performance for "Someone for Me"
| Chart (2024) | Peak position |
|---|---|
| New Zealand Hot Singles (RMNZ) | 36 |

2025 chart performance for "Someone for Me"
| Chart (2025) | Peak position |
|---|---|
| UK Singles Sales (OCC) | 20 |

== Release history ==
"Someone for Me" release history
| Region | Date | Version | Format | Label | Ref. |
|---|---|---|---|---|---|
| Various | 18 October 2024 | Album version | Digital download; streaming | BMG; Darenote | |
| Various | 21 October 2024 | Extended mix | Digital download; streaming | BMG; Darenote | |
| Various | 17 January 2025 | New version | Digital download; streaming | BMG; Darenote | |
| Italy | 17 January 2025 | New version | Radio airplay | BMG | |
