= Godspeed (The Blessed Madonna album) =

Studio album by The Blessed Madonna
- Released: October 18, 2024
- Genre: Electronic
- Length: 73:20
- Label: FFRR

The Blessed Madonna chronology
Club Future Nostalgia (2020)	Godspeed (2024)

Godspeed is the debut studio album by American DJ and record producer Marea Stamper under the pseudonym The Blessed Madonna. It was released on October 18, 2024, through FFRR Records. It peaked at number 27 on the UK Album Downloads Chart, as well as number 5 on the UK Dance Albums Chart.

== Background ==
The album was constructed over a number of years. The Blessed Madonna's father died weeks before the first session of the album. His voice was featured on the album. The album includes the previously released tracks "Serotonin Moonbeams", "We Still Believe", "Mercy", "Carry Me Higher", "Happier", "Count On My Love", and "Edge of Saturday Night". The album's creative direction was handled by Sports Banger.

== Critical reception ==
Professional ratings
Review scores
Source	Rating
The Guardian	3/5 stars
MusicOMH	3/5 stars

Jem Aswad of Variety stated, "it's a masterfully created, produced and sequenced house-infused throwdown from one of the best DJs working today, the kind of rare album you could put on for a party and let play all the way through, and then play it again." Ammar Kalia of The Guardian described the album as "a sprawling odyssey that ranges from radio-friendly features to darker, bass-heavy tracks."

== Track listing ==
Godspeed track listing
No.	Title	Length
1.	"God Has Left the Room (Intro)"	0:14
2.	"Somebody's Daughter"	5:33
3.	"Nowhere Fast"	4:17
4.	"Henny, Hold Up" (featuring Mother Marygold and Ric Wilson)	4:19
5.	"Jinterlude"	0:17
6.	"Serotonin Moonbeams" (featuring Uffie)	4:47
7.	"Edge of Saturday Night" (featuring Kylie Minogue)	3:26
8.	"U Want 6 Grand 4 Wut? (Interlude)"	0:27
9.	"Blessed Already" (featuring Ric Wilson and Marbl)	4:19
10.	"Strength (R U Ready)" (featuring Joy Crookes)	3:22
11.	"Why Trax Records Still Sucks in 24 (Interlude)"	0:21
12.	"We Still Believe" (featuring Jamie Principle)	3:49
13.	"That's the Shhh (Pure Love) (Interlude)"	0:17
14.	"Carry Me Higher" (featuring Joy Anonymous and Danielle Ponder)	5:16
15.	"Henterlude"	0:22
16.	"Back 2 Love" (featuring Jin Jin)	3:57
17.	"Brand New" (featuring James Vincent McMorrow and A-Trak)	5:14
18.	"Count On My Love" (featuring Daniel Wilson and Kon)	5:55
19.	"Godspeed" (featuring DJ E-Clyps)	5:24
20.	"Secretariat" (featuring Shaun J. Wright and Kon)	4:11
21.	"Mercy (The Welcome)" (featuring Jacob Lusk and Jyroscope)	1:27
22.	"Mercy" (featuring Jacob Lusk)	2:59
23.	"Your Mom <3 (Interlude)"	0:24
24.	"Happier" (featuring Clementine Douglas)	2:50
Total length:		73:20

== Charts ==
Chart performance for Godspeed
Chart (2024)	Peak position
UK Album Downloads (Official Charts)	27
UK Dance Albums (Official Charts)	5
