= Tension II =

2024 studio album by Kylie Minogue

- Standard cover artwork

Studio album by Kylie Minogue
- Released: 18 October 2024
- Recorded: 2023–2024
- Studios: Blueball Studios (Sussex); Encore Recording (Los Angeles); Godsquad (London); Glenwood (Burbank); Lab of Love (London); Lucy's Meat Market (Los Angeles); MXM (Los Angeles); New Levels (London); Noatune (London); Private Sector (Los Angeles); Record Plant (Los Angeles); The Ribcage (Los Angeles); Rokstone (Los Angeles); The Roundhouse (Essex); Sleeper Sounds (London); Strongroom (London); Unknown locations (London, Los Angeles, Mexico, Melbourne)
- Genres: Dance-pop; electronic
- Length: 36:47
- Labels: Darenote; BMG
- Producers: Pat Alvarez; Neave Applebaum; Duck Blackwell; The Blessed Madonna; Dance System; Jennifer Decilveo; Diplo; German; Steve Mac; Vaughn Oliver; Orville Peck; Picard Brothers; Punctual; Jesse Shatkin; Jim-E Stack; Biff Stannard; Christopher Stracey; Lewis Thompson; TMS; Lostboy; Zhone

Kylie Minogue chronology
Tension (2023)	Tension II (2024)	Tension Tour//Live 2025 (2025)

Singles from Tension II
- 1. "Lights Camera Action" Released: 27 September 2024; 2. "Someone for Me" Released: 17 January 2025

Tension II is the seventeenth studio album by Australian singer Kylie Minogue. BMG and Minogue's company Darenote released it on 18 October 2024 in various digital, physical, and streaming formats. It is a sequel to her sixteenth studio album, Tension (2023), and is described as the "high-energy, high-octane" companion to its predecessor. Unlike her previous records, Tension II features several new producers and collaborators, as well as returning collaborators Duck Blackwell, Richard "Biff" Stannard, Peter "Lostboy" Rycroft, and Ina Wroldsen.

Tension II is a dance-pop and electropop album that includes elements of club, disco, and synth-pop music, and the lyrics cover topics such as having fun, love, lust, envy, flirting, loneliness, and fashion. Furthermore, some reviewers said the album's sound and production were similar to Tension and her fifteenth album, Disco (2020). Before its release, "My Oh My" featuring Bebe Rexha and Tove Lo, as well as three other collaborative singles were released: "Dance Alone" with Sia, "Midnight Ride" with Orville Peck and Diplo, and "Edge of Saturday Night" with The Blessed Madonna.

Tension II received praise from most music critics. Reviewers praised its danceable nature and Minogue's attitude throughout the record, with some claiming it was superior to Tension and one of her best offerings. Few were ambivalent about the collaborative efforts and the album's lack of catchy material. "Lights Camera Action" is the album's lead single, released on 27 September 2024. The Tension Tour, promoting both records, began in Perth in February 2025 and travelled through Australia, Asia, Europe, North America, and the United Kingdom, with additional appearances in South America.

== Background ==
On 22 September 2023, Minogue released Tension, her sixteenth studio album, following Disco in 2020. Upon its release, it received universal acclaim from music critics for its production quality as well as Minogue's personality and delivery throughout the album, with many publications naming it one of the best records of the year and one of Minogue's best works to date. Commercially, it was a success, reaching number one on various record charts in Australia, Belgium, Ireland, Scotland, the United Kingdom, and the United States. To promote the album, she released three singles, including "Padam Padam" and the title track, both of which were critical and commercial successes, generating viral sensation and cultural significance. In January 2024, Variety reported that Tension would be repackaged and released later that year. The following month, Minogue hinted at working on new music during an interview at the 66th Annual Grammy Awards, where she received her second Grammy this time for Grammy Award for Best Pop Dance Recording for "Padam Padam".

== Concept and development ==
[Publishing Tension II] wasn’t the intention. I wish we had this great idea when we were making Tension: Hey, we have enough, let’s save it for Tension II. [...] We started to head down that road, but because of the success with "Padam Padam", more and more songs are being sent to me than perhaps the year before. I wouldn’t have been the name outside writers thought of [then] when it came to the right person for a song. I was also in the studio with great writers. But long story short, I’m a pen-and-paper girl, and I kept writing lists of all of the songs we were working on.

— Minogue to Vogue in 2024

Minogue had no intention of making a new record initially and instead planned to expand on her previous album with new material. However, after evaluating several songs that did not appear on Tension and later having the opportunity to work with new producers and writers for Tension II, she decided to scrap the repackage of Tension in favour of creating a new record. At the beginning of 2024, she was featured on several collaborations, including "Dance Alone" with Australian singer Sia and "Midnight Ride" with South African artist Orville Peck and American producer Diplo. In July, Minogue confirmed she was working on new music, and teased a potential live comeback in the United Kingdom. On 8 July, Minogue teased new music on social media with the acronym "MOM," which turned out to be her single "My Oh My", with American singer Bebe Rexha and Swedish singer Tove Lo. It also inspired the Gemini zodiac aesthetic of the album cover and title for Tension II. She later released "Edge of Saturday Night", which features British-American DJ the Blessed Madonna. Minogue teased an announcement on her social media on 18 September, and one day later, she revealed Tension II, its release formats, the lead single "Lights Camera Action", and the announcement of her Tension Tour. Additionally, it is Minogue's first sequel project.

Tension II features all of Minogue's collaborations from 2024. (Note: "Edge of Saturday" and "Dance Alone" appear on the Blessed Madonna's album Godspeed (2024) and Sia's album Reasonable Woman (2024) respectively.) Certain songs, such as "Edge of Saturday Night" with the Blessed Madonna, were originally conceived in 2020 during the COVID-19 lockdowns. Originally, the song was a collaboration with British singer Raye, who is listed as a co-songwriter. However, due to other release commitments, she did not appear in the final recording, and the track was handed over to Minogue. The Blessed Madonna describes the track as "about edges", saying "When I sat down to write lyrics for the very first time, I was on the edge of a brand new life. When I programmed and wrote the music that would become this song, I was on the edge of the next big leap into producing." Furthermore, the Blessed Madonna stated, "It’s fitting that this song is about an equally important edge in my life. It was a morning that magically turned into night." Minogue described it as one of the more difficult songs to record, referring to multiple takes before reaching the final version. Minogue appears as an engineer on the majority of the tracks, and songs such as "Taboo" and "Someone for Me" were recorded in hotel rooms, with the latter in Mexico.

== Music and songs ==
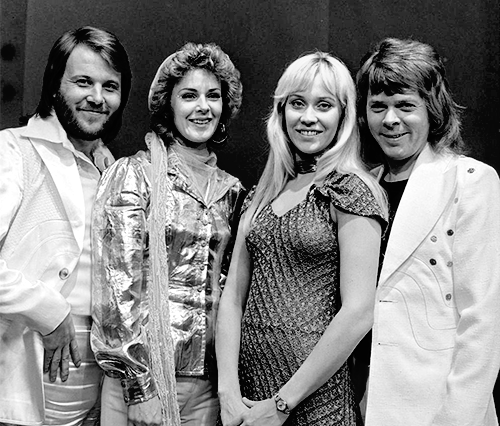
Numerous critics compared the song "Taboo" to the works of ABBA (pictured) and Madonna.

Tension II is a dance-pop and electronic album that includes elements of club, disco, electropop, pop, and synth-pop music. It is marketed as the "high-energy, high-octane" version of Tension, with additional "dance floor anthems" and a more electronic-driven sound. Critics compared it to work on Tension and Minogue's fifteenth album, Disco (2020), and noted similarities to the production and sound of Minogue's single "Padam Padam". According to Robbin Murray of Clash, the album "leans on the club energies of the original, while steering them into different places," whereas Alexa Camp of Slant Magazine described the sound as "propulsive electro-pop and breezy synth-pop", which mirrors Tension. According to Joe Muggs of The Arts Desk, the album is primarily made up of "fizzy dancefloor pumpers," while Quentin Harrison of The Line of Best Fit believes it "maintains the uptempo dance-pop persuasion of its forerunner." Forbes' writer Chris Malone Mendez described the album as "packed with dance-pop outings of various tempos designed for any kind of party". Austrian outlet Kronen Zeitung noted the album's mix of "disco anthems, EDM stompers, electropop, and a touch of the 80s". Lyrically, the album explores themes such as having fun, love, lust, envy, flirting, loneliness and fashion. Minogue stated that based on feedback she received about the material on Tension II, she described it as more "energetic" than its predecessor.

The album opens with "Lights Camera Action", which is a "high-energy" club-inspired electronic and Eurodance track with "raving synths" and "hard strutting beats" that lasts two minutes and 42 seconds and has been compared to her work on Tension. Minogue named "Taboo" as one of her favourite songs on the album, and critics compared its disco elements and string arrangements to those of Swedish group ABBA, as well as songs like "Hung Up" by Madonna and "Toxic" by Britney Spears. It was also praised for its use of the French phrase "un, deux, trois" and lyrical references to desiring someone who is off limits. "Someone for Me" is influenced by 1990s dance-pop, disco, and house music, with elements of Ibiza and Balearic beat and instrumentation. Lyrically, the song discusses feeling happy for someone who is in a relationship while also wanting one for yourself. "Good as Gone" is a Balearic house and disco track with string arrangements and heavy basslines, as well as a cappella sections that discuss heartbreak. "Kiss Bang Bang" is a Europop and pop song with heavy synths and processed vocals that has been compared to "Padam Padam". "Diamonds" is influenced by disco and pop music, with a pulsing bassline throughout the arrangement. "Hello" is an outtake from Tension's original sessions that has been reworked into an electropop, electronica, and synth-pop track with lyrics that express sexuality and thematically describe a bootycall.

"Dance to the Music" is a disco track with funk and electropop elements, as well as thick basslines and processed vocals; musically, it has been compared to Minogue's work on Disco. "Shoulda Left Ya" is a slower ballad that incorporates elements of dance, electronic, and country-pop influences while discussing heavy emotions and regret. "Edge of Saturday Night" with The Blessed Madonna has a different arrangement and sound from the original mix; the song begins with a piano house and transitions to a 1990s-influenced electronic and house beat with heavy bass. "My Oh My" with Rexha and Lo is a dance-pop song with club elements that pays homage to the "unmistakable Kylie 'la la la' refrain, a thumping bass line" and "playful lyrics," later adding that it is "destined to be a summer dance floor favourite." Lyrically, it is about flirtation, with each singer using their astrological sign throughout the lyrics to introduce themselves in a playful manner to a potential lover. "Midnight Ride" combines Peck's country music with Minogue's disco music, featuring a "EDM festival-core whistle refrain" and "mechanical guitar chugs throughout". The album's closing track, "Dance Alone" with Sia, is a pop and disco number that has been compared to Minogue's work on Tension and Disco.

== Release and packaging ==
Tension II received a wide release on 18 October 2024 by BMG and Darenote, and serves as her fourth output with both labels. The album includes 13 songs, four of which were previously released, as well as nine unreleased songs. Tension II was distributed in a variety of physical formats and bundles via Minogue's official store and outlets, including a digisleeve with a 12-page booklet, a clear and turquoise-coloured gatefold vinyl, a yellow-coloured vinyl, and a coral-coloured cassette; early bundles included signed artwork. The standard tracklist differs from the vinyl and cassette versions, with minor changes to song placement. Prior to its release, Minogue held listening events for the album in Singapore, New York City, and Atlanta. Visualisers for each of the non-singles were made available on Minogue's YouTube channel on the day of release. Minogue released extended versions of the album's tracks on her website for a limited time.

Studio Moross handled the album's promotional shoots, while Charlotte Rutherford photographed the album cover with creative direction from Aries Moross. It features Minogue standing in the centre of a crystallized Gemini symbol, with the album title at the top and her name at the bottom. Three additional limited edition covers were released on her website and were laminated in rainbow foil. In an interview with Hits Radio, Minogue compared the album cover to the artwork of her eighth studio album, Fever (2001), stating, "I was actually on a moving swing with ropes [...] In getting that picture, there was a lot of tension to deal with [...] To me, the album cover looks a little bit a throwback to Fever, it's like the grown-up sister or something". The title is a direct follow-up to Tension and a loose reference to Minogue's astrological sign Gemini, stating, "It could have been called Intention, More Tension, Hypertension, Extension, who knows! But Tension II just made sense, and the symbol of the two is the Gemini symbol."

== Promotion ==
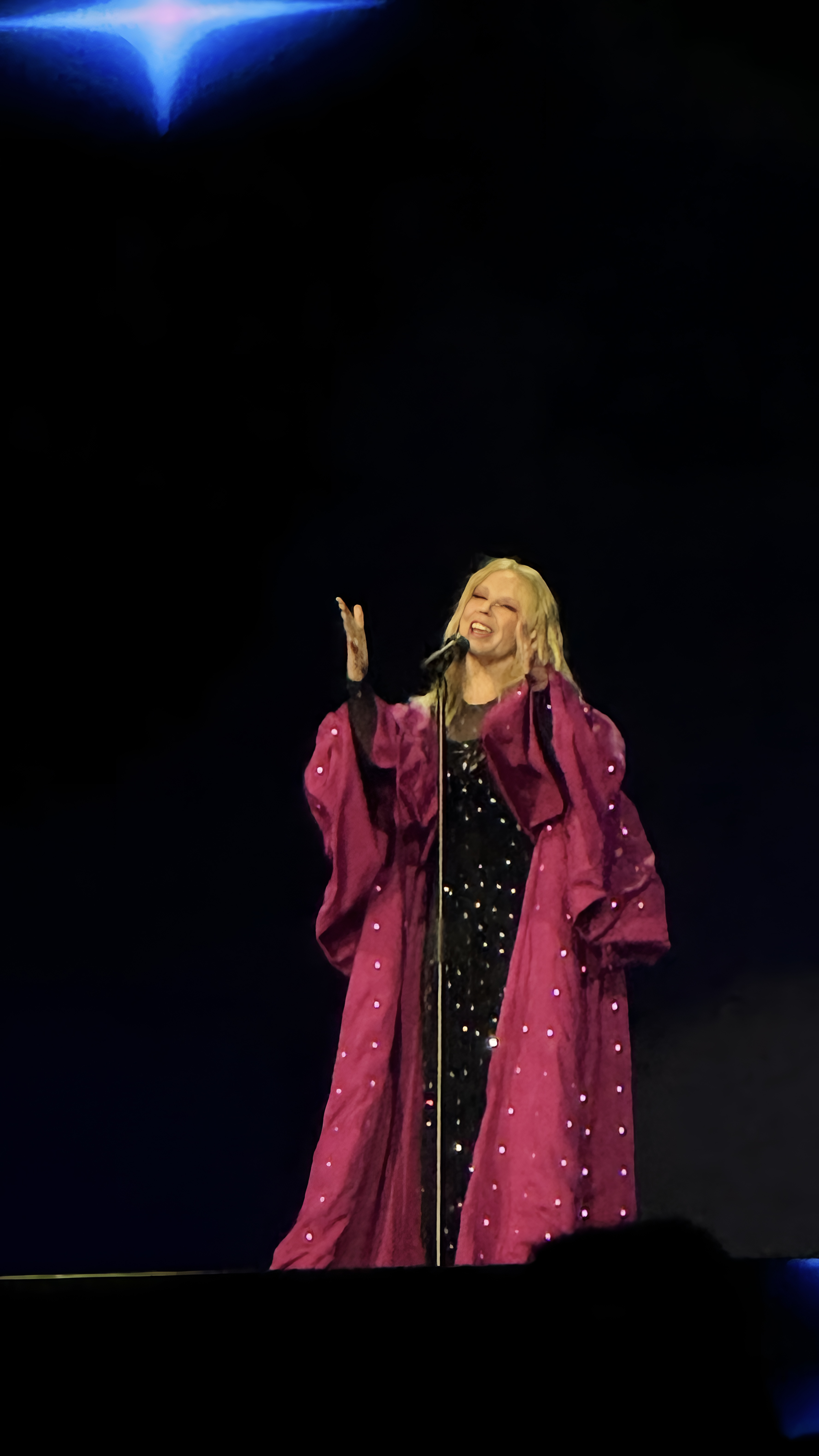
Minogue performing at the Sziget Festival in Budapest in 2024

The second single from Sia's Reasonable Woman album, "Dance Alone" premiered at one of Minogue's More Than Just a Residency shows and was released by Atlantic on 7 February 2024. Upon its release, the song received favourable to mixed reactions, with some critics praising Minogue's contributions to the track and others criticising its similar sound to Minogue's album Tension, and believing Sia was inferior to Minogue's contributions. Commercially, it reached the top ten of component charts in Australia, Croatia, Hungary, Latvia, Lithuania, and the United States. A music video premiered on Sia's YouTube channel. "Midnight Ride", the second single from Orville Peck's album, Stampede in collaboration with Peck and Diplo premiered on 7 June by Warner Music. Commercially, it reached number 34 on the New Zealand Hot Singles chart and number 7 on the UK Singles Downloads Chart, and it was nominated for The Crossover Song of 2024 at the 2024 People's Choice Country Awards.

On 11 July, Minogue released "My Oh My" with Rexha and Lo in digital, streaming and physical formats. It is Minogue's second collaboration with Lo (the first was "Really Don't Like U" in 2019) and first with Rexha. The song received positive feedback from critics for its summery vibe. Commercially, it charted in Australia, Estonia, New Zealand, the United Kingdom, and the United States. The music video premiered on 9 August and was filmed on location at the English stately home Syon House in Brentford, which is the Duke of Northumberland's London residence. "Edge of Saturday Night" with The Blessed Madonna was released on 14 August by Warner and Margeverse. Originally conceived in 2020 as an idea by the latter singer, it features Minogue's vocals and additional songwriting credits. Commercially, it charted on component charts in New Zealand and the United Kingdom, and a music video featuring both singers at a party was released on 23 August.

=== Singles ===
"Lights Camera Action" serves as the lead single to Tension II, and was released on 27 September by BMG and Darenote. It was released on digital and streaming platforms, and later as a digital extended play (EP) with the original version, an extended mix, and remixes by Confidence Man, Zach Witness, and Jaconda. Upon release, "Lights Camera Action" received positive reviews from critics for its high energy, overall sound and Minogue's carefree vibe. British filmmaker and long-time collaborator Sophie Muller directed the music video, which features Minogue in various guises and performing the track on a staged set in Budapest, Hungary, and premiered on Minogue's YouTube channel the day after its release. The single received positive reviews from music critics and debuted on component charts in Australia, Germany, New Zealand, the United Kingdom, and the United States.

"Someone for Me" was released as the second single on 17 January 2025. The song was remixed by German DJ and production duo, YouNotUs.

=== Tension Tour ===
I am beyond excited to announce the Tension Tour 2025. I can’t wait to share beautiful and wild moments with fans all over the world, celebrating the Tension era and more! It’s been an exhilarating ride so far and now, get ready for your close up because I will be calling Lights, Camera, Action... and there will be a whole lot of Padaming!

— Minogue announcing the Tension Tour for 2025.

Minogue first mentioned touring in an interview in July 2024, when she announced a possible return to both Australia and the United Kingdom for shows. Minogue announced the Tension Tour on 20 September, the same day she revealed Tension II and "Lights Camera Action". This will be her first concert tour since Summer 2019, as well as her first series of shows since More Than Just a Residency. In response, she stated, "I am beyond excited to announce the Tension tour 2025. I can’t wait to share beautiful and wild moments with fans all over the world, celebrating the Tension era and more." The tour began on 15 February 2025 in Perth, and will travel through Australia, Asia, and the United Kingdom, with additional dates in Europe, North America, and South America confirmed. Due to huge demand in the United Kingdom, publications reported a significant boost in booking and rates throughout many hotels, citing a surge in reservations nearby each touring city and dubbing the phenomenon the "Kylie effect" by The London Standard.

== Critical reception ==
=== Reviews ===
Professional ratings
Aggregate scores
Source	Rating
AnyDecentMusic?	7.2/10
Metacritic	77/100
Review scores
Source	Rating
AllMusic	3.5/5 stars
Classic Pop	4/5 stars
The Independent	5/5 stars
The Irish Times	4/5 stars
The Line of Best Fit	9/10
NME	5/5 stars
Rolling Stone	3.5/5 stars
Slant Magazine	3.5/5 stars
The Telegraph	3/5 stars
The Times	4/5 stars

Tension II received positive reviews from music critics. Metacritic, which assigns a weighted average based on ratings from publications, gave the album a 77 out of 100 based on twelve reviews, indicating "generally favourable reviews". According to AnyDecentMusic?, which assigns a weighted average based on publication ratings, the album received a 7.2 out of 10 rating from 14 reviews. During its release week, Rolling Stone UK ranked the album as one of the best, whereas The Times listed it as one of the best albums of 2024.

Ky Stewart of Junkee called it one of Minogue's best albums and a "solidification of Kylie's legacy in pop music". Stewart praised the record's danceability and Minogue's attitude throughout, describing it as "louder, sexier, and more unapologetic". Helen Brown of The Independent gave it five stars, calling it "Bolder, tougher, and more inventive than its party-starting predecessor", and praising Minogue's performances and most of the tracks, with the exception of "My Oh My", which Brown called "forgettable". Claire Dunton of The Music praised "Lights Camera Action" and "Taboo" as standouts, saying the record provided the "same fun, dopamine-delivering experience that all her albums offer". Will Hodgkinson of The Times declared it "tight, disciplined pop disco, with hooks that draw you in and feverish climaxes in all the right places". I editor Ed Powers praised the collaborations, citing "Midnight Ride" and "Hello" as standouts, and called the album a "full-on bevy of boppers and belters, with Kylie's bottomless charisma fuelling the whole thing". Puah Ziwei of NME noted "everything about the record is classic Kylie at her best" while singling out 'Hello' and 'Diamonds' as the faults of the record.

Quentin Harrison of The Line of Best Fit praised Kylie Minogue's upbeat album, saying its "sharp craft [...] confirms that this is Kylie Minogue's world, we're just fortunate enough to live in it." Alim Kheraj of Attitude described it as a "glorious victory lap that surpasses its predecessor". Lauren Murphy of The Irish Times described it as a "tenacious collection" of songs, and while she praised the collaborations as separate songs, Murphy felt their inclusion was "unnecessary". Ludovic Hunter-Tilney of Financial Times felt that Tension II "sticks more closely to trademark Minoguery" than her previous record, highlighting "Taboo" as a standout and criticising "Midnight Ride" as a "daft trip" and "Dance Alone" as "characterless". Neil Z. Yeung of AllMusic' praised the album's danceable nature, saying it offered "irresistible dance anthems", but he preferred "more immediate cuts on Disco and the first Tension". John Earls of Classic Pop gave the album four stars. Earls praised the album's sound and new songs, declaring them "worthy of full Kylie bling". Earls was critical of the collaborative efforts, claiming they were the only "padding" to Tension II, with the exception of "Edge of Saturday Night". Robin Murray of Clash called the album "vintage Kylie" and praised several tracks. However, Murray felt it was "embedded in Kylie's more up-front pop tendencies" and "does make the project feel a little slim in places", citing "Hello" and "Dance to the Music" as examples.

Talia M. Wilson of Riff praised the record's "energetic and fun" nature, but felt the material was too similar to the sound of "Padam Padam", writing that there was "unnecessary idea rehashing going on". Alexa Camp of Slant Magazine called it Minogue's most "shamelessly ingratiating collection of dance-pop songs" since her 2010 album Aphrodite. However, Camp was critical of the collaborative efforts, with the exception of "Edge of Saturday Night", and believed their inclusion, along with the album's track "Dance to the Music", prevented it from being a "stronger album than its predecessor". Joe Muggs of The Arts Desk praised tracks like "Edge of Saturday Night" and "Good as Gone" and applauded Minogue's stamina throughout the album, but questioned the motive as a sequel to Tension, its straightforward dance sound, and hypothesised "what a truly mature Kylie album [..] might sound like?". Pip Ellwood-Hughes from Entertainment Focus was more critical, finding most of the material too similar to Minogue's previous albums, such as Tension and Disco, and believing it lacked cohesion and was not well thought out. Kronen Zeitung gave it a mixed review. Although the review called Tension II a "solid pop album", they felt it was inferior to Tension, citing its lack of catchy material and "homogeneous" mix. Shaad D'Souza of The Observer was critical, writing that although it was sometimes "sparky and sometimes gratifying", they believed it "fails to recreate the highs of its predecessor, instead choosing to replicate the animating ideas of Padam Padam – anonymous, sledgehammer-subtle Eurotrash beats; nonsensical vocal hooks; self-aware attempts at camp – over and over, until those ideas have all been worn down to nothing."

=== Awards and recognition ===
At the 2025 ARIA Music Awards, the album was nominated for Best Pop Release and Best Solo Artist.

== Commercial performance ==
It is so awesome to see Australia’s OG pop queen continuing to dominate globally and at home, bringing joy and disco into our lives. Huge congratulations to her and her team for such a phenomenal career, five consecutive #1 albums, and continuing to represent Australia on the world stage!

— Annabelle Herd, CEO of the Australian Recording Industry Association (ARIA), congratulating Minogue on the success with Tension II in Australia.

In Australia, Tension II debuted at number one on the ARIA Albums Chart, as well as on the Australian Artists and Vinyl Albums charts. It became Minogue's eighth number-one studio album, her fifth consecutive number-one, and her ninth number-one album overall in the country. Furthermore, Minogue ranks ninth on the list of acts with the most number-one albums in the Australia. In New Zealand, it debuted at number 22 on the regional albums chart, trailing her previous work. In Japan, the album debuted at number 47 on the Billboard Japan Download Albums chart and 40 on the Oricon Digital Albums chart.

Tension II topped the UK Albums Chart with 35,235 units in its first week, becoming Minogue's tenth number-one album in the chart. With this feat, she joined ABBA, Coldplay, Queen and Michael Jackson, extending her record as the third female artist with the most number one albums, behind Madonna and Taylor Swift with 12, as of 2024. The album also debuted at number one on the Official Vinyl Albums Chart.

In the United States, Tension II debuted at number 98 on the Billboard 200 with 9,000 pure album sales.

== Track listing ==
Tension II track listing
No.	Title	Writer(s)	Producer(s)	Length
1.	"Lights Camera Action"	Lewis Thompson; Ina Wroldsen; Kylie Minogue	Thompson; Adria Garcia^{[a]}	2:42
2.	"Taboo"	Steve Mac; Wroldsen	Mac	2:48
3.	"Someone for Me"	Peter Rycroft; Sarah Hudson; Brett McLaughlin; Pablo Bowman; Kevin Hickey; Ryan Ashley	Lostboy; Zhone	2:34
4.	"Good as Gone"	Benjamin Kohn; Peter Kelleher; Thomas Barnes; Caroline Ailin; Noonie Bao	TMS	3:09
5.	"Kiss Bang Bang"	Minogue; Oliver Peterhof; Neave Applebaum; Alna Hofmeyr; James Norton	German; Applebaum	2:27
6.	"Diamonds"	Minogue; Jennifer Decilveo; Vaughn Oliver; Jesse St. John; Danny LeVan-Cicchetti	Decilveo; Oliver	2:42
7.	"Hello"	John Morgan; William Lansley; Wroldsen; Applebaum; Kasper Larsen	Applebaum; Punctual	2:44
8.	"Dance to the Music"	Minogue; Decilveo; Oliver; St. John; Tobias Wincorn	Oliver	2:31
9.	"Shoulda Left Ya"	Minogue; Biff Stannard; Gez O'Connell; Duck Blackwell	Stannard; Blackwell	2:20
10.	"Edge of Saturday Night" (with the Blessed Madonna)	Minogue; Jin Jin; Marea Stamper; Rachel Keen	The Blessed Madonna; Dance System; Pat Alvarez; Joy Anonymous^{[a]}; Jay Reynolds^{[a]}	3:26
11.	"My Oh My" (with Bebe Rexha and Tove Lo)	Mac; Wroldsen; Tove Lo	Mac	3:01
12.	"Midnight Ride" (with Orville Peck and Diplo)	Minogue; Orville Peck; Christopher Stracey; Marta Cikojevic	Diplo; Peck; Stracey; Picard Brothers	3:31
13.	"Dance Alone" (with Sia)	Sia Furler; Jesse Shatkin	Shatkin; Jim-E Stack	2:52
Total length:				36:47

Tension II – Extended edition track listing
No.	Title	Writer(s)	Producer(s)	Length
14.	"Lights Camera Action" (extended mix)	Thompson; Wroldsen; Minogue	Thompson; Garcia^{[a]}	3:55
15.	"Taboo" (extended mix)	Mac; Wroldsen	Mac	4:10
16.	"Someone for Me" (extended mix)	Rycroft; Hudson; McLaughlin; Bowman; Hickey; Ashley	Lostboy; Zhone	4:09
17.	"Good as Gone" (extended mix)	Kohn; Kelleher; Barnes; Ailin; Bao	TMS	4:10
18.	"Kiss Bang Bang" (extended mix)	Minogue; Peterhof; Applebaum; Hofmeyr; Norton	German; Applebaum	4:02
19.	"Diamonds" (extended mix)	Minogue; Decilveo; Oliver; St. John; LeVan-Cicchetti	Decilveo; Oliver	3:57
20.	"Hello" (extended mix)	Morgan; Lansley; Wroldsen; Applebaum; Larsen	Applebaum; Punctual	3:53
21.	"Dance to the Music" (extended mix)	Minogue; Decilveo; Oliver; St. John; Wincorn	Oliver	4:03
22.	"Shoulda Left Ya" (extended mix)	Minogue; Stannard; O'Connell; Blackwell	Stannard; Blackwell	4:21
23.	"Edge of Saturday Night" (extended mix) (with the Blessed Madonna)	Minogue; Jin Jin; Stamper; Keen	The Blessed Madonna; Dance System; Alvarez; Joy Anonymous^{[a]}; Reynolds^{[a]}	4:08
24.	"My Oh My" (extended mix) (with Bebe Rexha and Tove Lo)	Mac; Wroldsen; Lo	Mac	4:03
25.	"Midnight Ride" (extended mix) (with Orville Peck and Diplo)	Minogue; Peck; Stracey; Cikojevic	Diplo; Peck; Stracey; Picard Brothers	4:28
26.	"Dance Alone" (extended mix) (with Sia)	Furler; Shatkin	Shatkin; Jim-E Stack	4:05
Total length:				53:16

Notes

- ^{^[a]} signifies an additional producer.
- The vinyl & cassette release track listing rearranges the 13 tracks placing "My Oh My" as track 1, "Edge of Saturday Night" as track 6 & "Midnight Ride" as track 7 with the CD & digital release tracks 1–4 placed as tracks 2–5 & tracks 5–9 placed as tracks 8–12 respectively. Only "Dance Alone" has the same placement on all releases as track 13.

== Credits ==
=== Recording studios ===
- Bluebell Studios (Sussex)
- Encore Recording Studios (Los Angeles)
- Glenwood Studios (Burbank)
- Godsquad Studio (London)
- Lab of Love Studios (London)
- Lucy's Meat Market (Los Angeles)
- MXM Studios (Los Angeles)
- New Levels Studios (London)
- Noatune Studio (London)
- Private Sector Studios (Los Angeles)
- Record Plant (Los Angeles)
- Rokstone Studios (Los Angeles)
- Sleeper Sounds Studios (London)
- Sony Music Entertainment
- Strongroom Studios (London)
- The Ribcoge (Los Angeles)
- The Roundhouse Studio (Essex)
- Warner Music UK Limited

=== Musicians ===
- Kylie Minogue – vocals
- Ina Wroldsen – backing vocals (tracks 1, 2, 11)
- Lewis Thompson – bass, drums, programming, synthesizer (track 1)
- Chris Laws – drums (tracks 2, 11)
- Steve Mac – keyboards (tracks 2, 11)
- Peter Rycroft – bass programming, drum programming, guitar, keyboards (track 3)
- Kevin Hickey – guitar, programming (track 3)
- Pablo Bowman – backing vocals (track 3)
- Sarah Hudson – backing vocals (track 3)
- Benjamin Kohn – bass, guitar (track 4)
- Thomas Barnes – drums, programming (track 4)
- Peter Kelleher – keyboards, synthesizer (track 4)
- Caroline Ailin – backing vocals (track 4)
- Rosie Danvers – cello (track 4)
- Tommy Danvers – keyboards (track 4)
- Zahra Benyounes – viola, violin (track 4)
- Neave Applebaum – bass, drums, programming (tracks 5, 7); keyboards (5)
- German – drums, keyboards, programming (track 5)
- Alna Hofmeyr – backing vocals (track 5)
- Vaughn Oliver – bass, drums, programming, synthesizer (tracks 6, 8)
- Jennifer Decilveo – bass, drums, guitar, programming, synthesizer, vocals (track 6)
- John Morgan – bass, drums, programming, synthesizer (track 7)
- Will Lansley – bass, drums, programming, synthesizer (track 7)
- Duck Blackwell – bass, drums, guitar, keyboards (track 9)
- Biff Stannard – keyboards, percussion (track 9)
- Gez O'Connell – guitar (track 9)
- Raye – backing vocals (track 10)
- The Blessed Madonna – drums, piano, programming, synthesizer (track 10)
- Dance System – electric piano, electronic drums, keyboards, piano, programming, synthesizer (track 10)
- Joy Anonymous – programming (track 10)
- Pat Alvarez – programming (track 10)
- Grace Banks – synthesizer (track 10)
- Harald James Jones – synthesizer (track 10)
- Bebe Rexha – vocals (track 11)
- Tove Lo – vocals (track 11)
- Christopher Stracey – baritone guitar, bass, guitar, Mellotron (track 12)
- Kane Ritchotte – drums, percussion (track 12)
- Marta Cikojevic – backing vocals (track 12)
- Benny Bock – Fender Rhodes (track 12)
- Orville Peck – vocals (track 12)
- Diplo – programming (track 12)
- Jesse Shatkin – bass, drum programming, drums, keyboards, percussion, synthesizer (track 13)
- Jim-E Stack – bass, drum programming, keyboards, percussion, synthesizer (track 13)
- Sia – vocals (track 13)
- Eli Teplin – keyboards (track 13)

=== Technicians ===
- Dick Beetham – mastering (tracks 1–9, 11)
- Jay Reynolds – mastering, mixing (track 10)
- Randy Merrill – mastering (track 12)
- Chris Gehringer – mastering (track 13)
- Guy Massey – mixing (tracks 1–3, 5–9, 11)
- Serban Ghenea – mixing (track 13)
- Mark "Spike" Stent – mixing (tracks 4, 12)
- Kylie Minogue – engineering (tracks 1–4, 7, 12, 13)
- Chris Laws – engineering (tracks 2, 11)
- Dann Pursey – engineering (tracks 2, 11)
- Lostboy – engineering (track 3)
- Zhone – engineering (track 3)
- Chris Bishop – engineering (track 4)
- Kieron Beardmore – engineering (track 4)
- Lewis Wright – engineering (track 4)
- Matt Wolach – engineering (track 4)
- TommyD – engineering (track 4)
- Vaughn Oliver – engineering (tracks 6, 8)
- Jennifer Decilveo – engineering (track 6)
- Neave Applebaum – engineering (track 7)
- Duck Blackwell – engineering (track 9)
- The Blessed Madonna – engineering, vocal engineering (track 10)
- Grace Banks – engineering (track 10)
- Pat Alvarez – engineering (track 10)
- Pete Min – engineering (track 12)
- Jesse Shatkin – engineering (track 13)
- Ezekiel Chabon – additional engineering (track 13)
- Samuel Dent – additional engineering (track 13)
- Bryce Bordone – mixing assistance (track 13)
- Kevin Hickey – arrangement (track 3)
- Rosie Danvers – strings arrangement (track 4)

== Charts ==
=== Weekly charts ===
Weekly chart performance for Tension II
Chart (2024)	Peak position
Australian Albums (ARIA)	1
Austrian Albums (Ö3 Austria)	6
Belgian Albums (Ultratop Flanders)	4
Belgian Albums (Ultratop Wallonia)	3
Canadian Albums (Billboard)	64
Dutch Albums (Album Top 100)	5
Finnish Albums (Suomen virallinen lista)	27
French Albums (SNEP)	21
German Albums (Offizielle Top 100)	4
Hungarian Physical Albums (MAHASZ)	34
Irish Albums (Official Charts)	8
Italian Albums (FIMI)	25
Japanese Download Albums (Billboard Japan)	47
Japanese Digital Albums (Oricon)	40
New Zealand Albums (RMNZ)	22
Scottish Albums (Official Charts)	1
Spanish Albums (PROMUSICAE)	3
Swedish Physical Albums (Sverigetopplistan)	2
Swiss Albums (Schweizer Hitparade)	4
UK Albums (Official Charts)	1
UK Independent Albums (Official Charts)	1
US Billboard 200	98
US Independent Albums (Billboard)	14
US Top Dance Albums (Billboard)	2

=== Year-end charts ===
Year-end chart performance for Tension II
Chart (2024)	Position
Australian Artist Albums (ARIA)	11
UK CD Albums (OCC)	19
Chart (2025)	Position
Australian Artist Albums (ARIA)	44

== Certifications ==
Region	Certification	Certified units/sales
United Kingdom (BPI)	Silver	60,000^{‡}
^{‡} Sales+streaming figures based on certification alone.

== Release history ==
Tension II release history
Region	Date	Format	Editions	Label	Ref.
Various	18 October 2024	CD; cassette; LP; digital download; streaming	Standard	Darenote; BMG	
Various	21 October 2024	Digital download	Extended	Darenote; BMG	
