= Tension Tour =

2025 concert tour by Kylie Minogue

- Tour by Kylie Minogue
- Promotional poster
- Location: Asia; Australia; Europe; Latin America; North America
- Associated albums: Tension; Tension II
- Start date: 15 February 2025
- End date: 26 August 2025
- No. of shows: 66
- Supporting acts: Jodie Harsh; Mallrat; Rita Ora; Romy
- Attendance: 576,000 (Note: Based on 62 reported shows.)
- Box office: US$78.4 million
- Website: www.kylie.com/live/

Kylie Minogue concert chronology
- More Than Just a Residency (2023–2024); Tension Tour (2025)

The Tension Tour was the sixteenth headlining concert tour by Australian singer Kylie Minogue. It commenced on 15 February 2025 in Perth, Australia, and concluded on 26 August 2025 in Monterrey, Mexico, consisting of 66 shows. Minogue announced the tour in September 2024, following the release of her sixteenth studio album, Tension (2023), and preceding the release of her seventeenth studio album, Tension II (2024). As of year-end reports for 2025, it earned US$78.4 million within 62 of its 66 shows.

Critics praised the show's energy and production, as well as its set list, which encompasses Minogue's career, ranging from her debut, "The Loco-Motion" (1987), to the critically acclaimed "Padam Padam" (2023). The tour also achieved several venue records for Minogue, including being the female with the most performances at Manchester's AO Arena and becoming the first female solo artist to perform a total of 21 times at the O_{2} Arena in London, England.

== Background ==
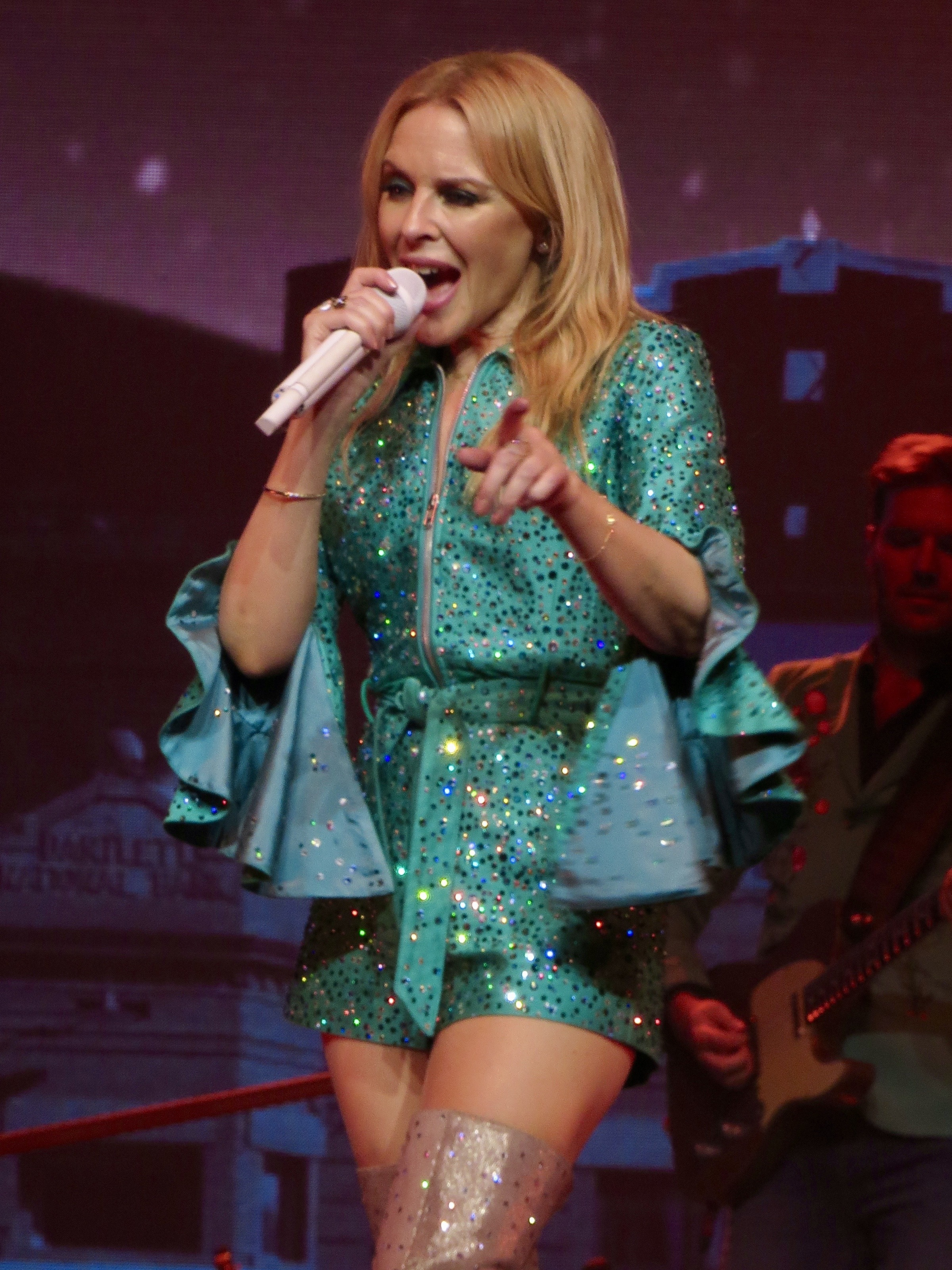
Minogue performing during the Golden Tour in 2018

Kylie Minogue embarked on the Golden Tour, her fifteenth concert tour from 2018 to 2019, in support of her fourteenth studio album Golden (2018). The tour was a commercial success, with both Billboard and Pollstar reporting the tour's three concerts in London, England, at the O_{2} Arena grossed $3,368,900 USD with 30,100 tickets sold, placing her at eighth spot for the biggest concerts of September 2018. In 2020, Minogue released Disco. Due to the ongoing COVID-19 pandemic, she livestreamed a special concert, Infinite Disco, featuring songs from the album as well as previous songs from her discography. In September 2023, Minogue released her sixteenth studio album Tension.

During promotion of Tension, Minogue first teased the possibility of a tour in the United States. During a 12 July 2023 appearance on Watch What Happens Live with Andy Cohen, she teased a tour or Las Vegas residency were "very possible" at the time. Fifteen days later, More Than Just a Residency was announced. Serving as the inaugural residency at the Voltaire at the Venetian Las Vegas, the show ran from November 2023 to May 2024. Following the initially planned November 2023 shows selling out and continued high demand, additional dates spanning from December of the same year to May 2024 were announced in August 2023. The residency was both critically and commercially successful.

During a February 2024 appearance on The Jennifer Hudson Show, Minogue announced plans for a tour in the United States was in-the-works, revealing: "I haven't got the dates yet but we're working on it." On 19 September 2024, Minogue announced the Tension Tour dates in Asia, Australia and Europe. In connection to the tour announcement, she revealed Tension II, a sequel to 2023's Tension, would release on 18 October of the same year. In a statement concerning the tour's announcement, Minogue stated: "I am beyond excited to announce the 'Tension Tour 2025'. I can't wait to share beautiful and wild moments with fans all over the world, celebrating the Tension era and more! It's been an exhilarating ride so far and now, get ready for your close up because I will be calling Lights, Camera, Action... and there will be a whole lot of Padaming!" Additional Australian shows were announced on 25 September. The following day, two additional concerts in Manchester and London were announced, respectively.

On 30 September, during an appearance on Capital FM's Capital Breakfast, additional dates in London, Birmingham and Glasgow were announced, billed as the final shows to be held in the United Kingdom. On 3 October 2024, concerts in North America were announced, marking her first tour to visit the region since 2011's Aphrodite: Les Folies Tour. On 7 October, Minogue announced two concerts in France during an appearance on Quotidien, with more dates in Europe added the following day. An additional concert at Madison Square Garden was announced on 9 October, due to demand. Two days later, Minogue announced Rita Ora and Romy would serve as supporting acts on during the North American concerts. Venues for the Asian dates were announced on 22 October. Two days later, Minogue announced eight concerts in Latin America. On 23 December 2024, the 17 March 2025 concert in the Philippines was cancelled. On 5 February 2025, it was announced Mallrat would serve as a supporting act for the Australian concerts. On 23 April, it was announced Minogue's concert on 29 April at Ball Arena was cancelled, due to a scheduling conflict with the 2025 NBA playoffs; initial reports claimed the concert was postponed. On 1 May, AXS announced Jodie Harsh would serve as a supporting act for the United Kingdom concerts. The following month, Harsh announced she had signed on for select European concerts.

As part of the tour, Minogue performed at several European festivals. They included: the Jazzopen Festival in Stuttgart, Germany, the Tinderbox Festival in Odense, Denmark, Bilbao BBK Live and Icónica Santalucía in Bilbao and Seville, Spain, respectively, and the Release Athens Festival in Athens, Greece. In June 2025, Tickantel revealed the 9 August concert in Montevideo, Uruguay, had been cancelled; the venue cited "logical reasons" for the cancellation. That same month, a concert in Mostazal, Chile, was announced for the same date as the cancelled Montevideo concert. On 13 June, Minogue announced the postponement of four concerts, citing laryngitis. Eleven days later, she announced only one of the shows had been rescheduled, with the three others cancelled due to being unable to reschedule.

== Staging and production ==
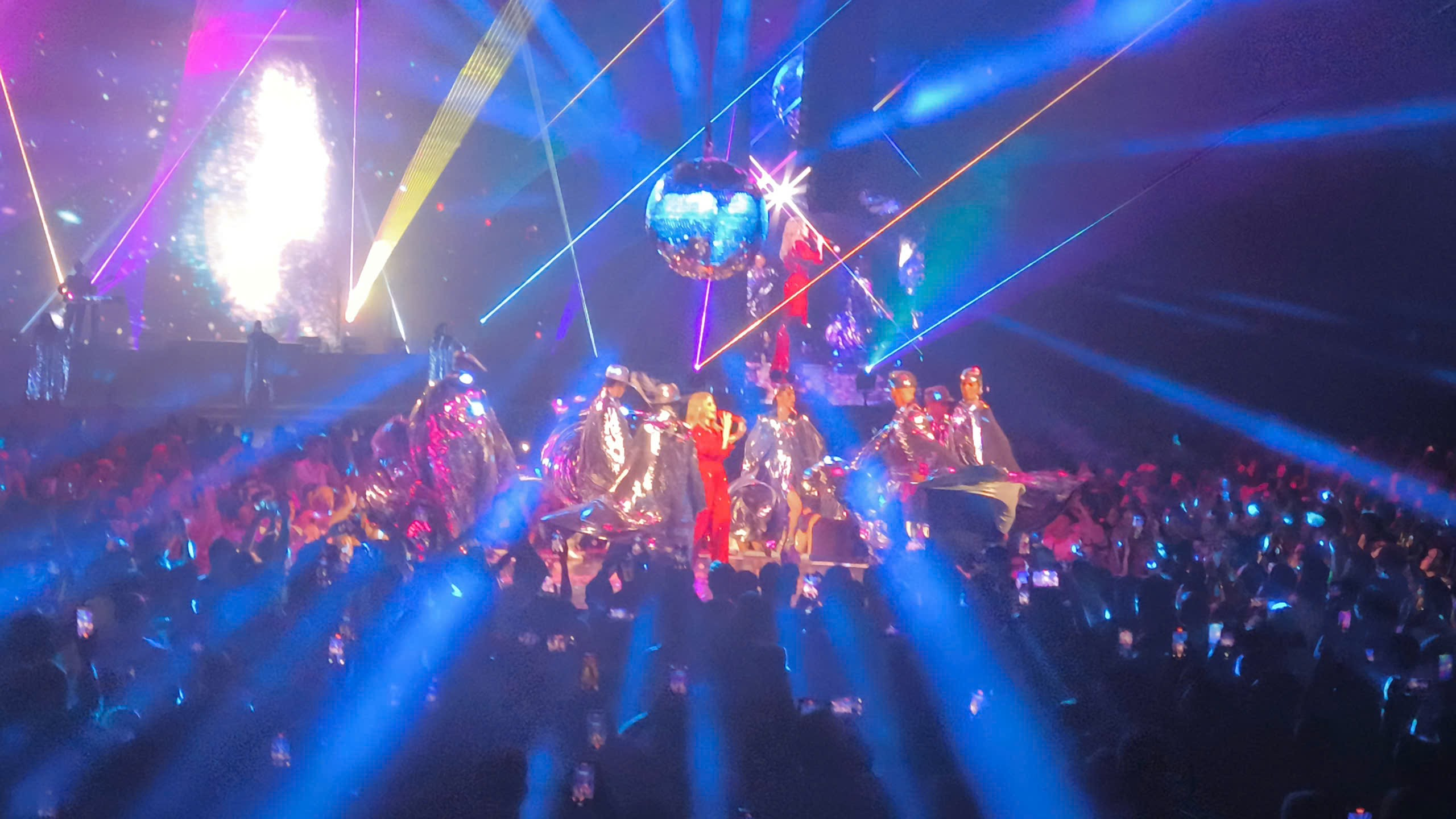
Minogue performing at Paragon Hall in Bangkok, showcasing lighting production, during the show's third act

Rob Sinclair served as the stage creative and lighting designer. He stated, "We tried to present her at the centre of everything without distraction. It's a chance for her and her audience to spend time together." The production incorporates screen-based elements, featuring three upstage video surfaces, two lateral display screens, video cubes integrated with the band’s setup, and a suspended square screen component. According to Sinclair, "It's a clean, modern world that sits well with the music of her two Tension albums." The lighting design incorporates MAC Viper XIP fixtures positioned across the stage, overhead, and at floor level, integrated with 114 Chauvet Color Strike M units that contribute to outlining the stage’s structure. The production manager of the tour, Kevin Hopgood, noted that in contrast to Minogue's previous tours, which were known for their theatricality, elaborate staging, and narrative-driven performances, this production adopts a more digital-centric approach, placing greater emphasis on screen-based visuals rather than traditional storytelling."

British director Sophie Muller, alongside Luke Hall Studios, created the original films for the tour, while English producer Steve Anderson served as a musical director. During an appearance on Nova FM's Ricki-Lee, Tim & Joel podcast, Minogue revealed the set list would chronicle the releases of Disco (2020), Tension (2023) and Tension II (2024), as well as "some of the old hits" and what she described as a 1990's "trip house" experimental-sounding concept, citing projects she'd done before and had "veered away from". She cited the Brothers in Rhythm remix of her "Confide in Me" as inspiration. In interviews with Audacy and Papelpop, she cited her desired intent to perform songs, such as "Locomotion", "Can't Get You Out of My Head", "Slow" and "All the Lovers", as well as teased "In My Arms" would be performed "for sure" in Brazil.

Keyboard player and musician Hazel Mills played the synths during the live shows. Mills has previously collaborated with music acts such as Florence and the Machine, Goldfrapp, Birdy, and Fraser T. Smith during their performances. UDO Super 6, alongside the Eventide H90 Harmonizer and Boss RE-202 Space Echo pedals, served as the primary equipment for Mills' work on the tour. She employed an expression pedal to modulate the filter to achieve the desired sounds. At the same time, the UDO synthesizer is connected via MIDI to facilitate program changes and control change (CC) messages. These functions are used to automate parameters when manual operation is not possible. A MIDI clock is also implemented to synchronize delays and low-frequency oscillators (LFOs). The Super 6’s audio output is routed through Apple’s MainStage software, which provides side-chain compression to produce the characteristic pulsing pad effect.

== Critical reception ==
=== Australia and North America ===
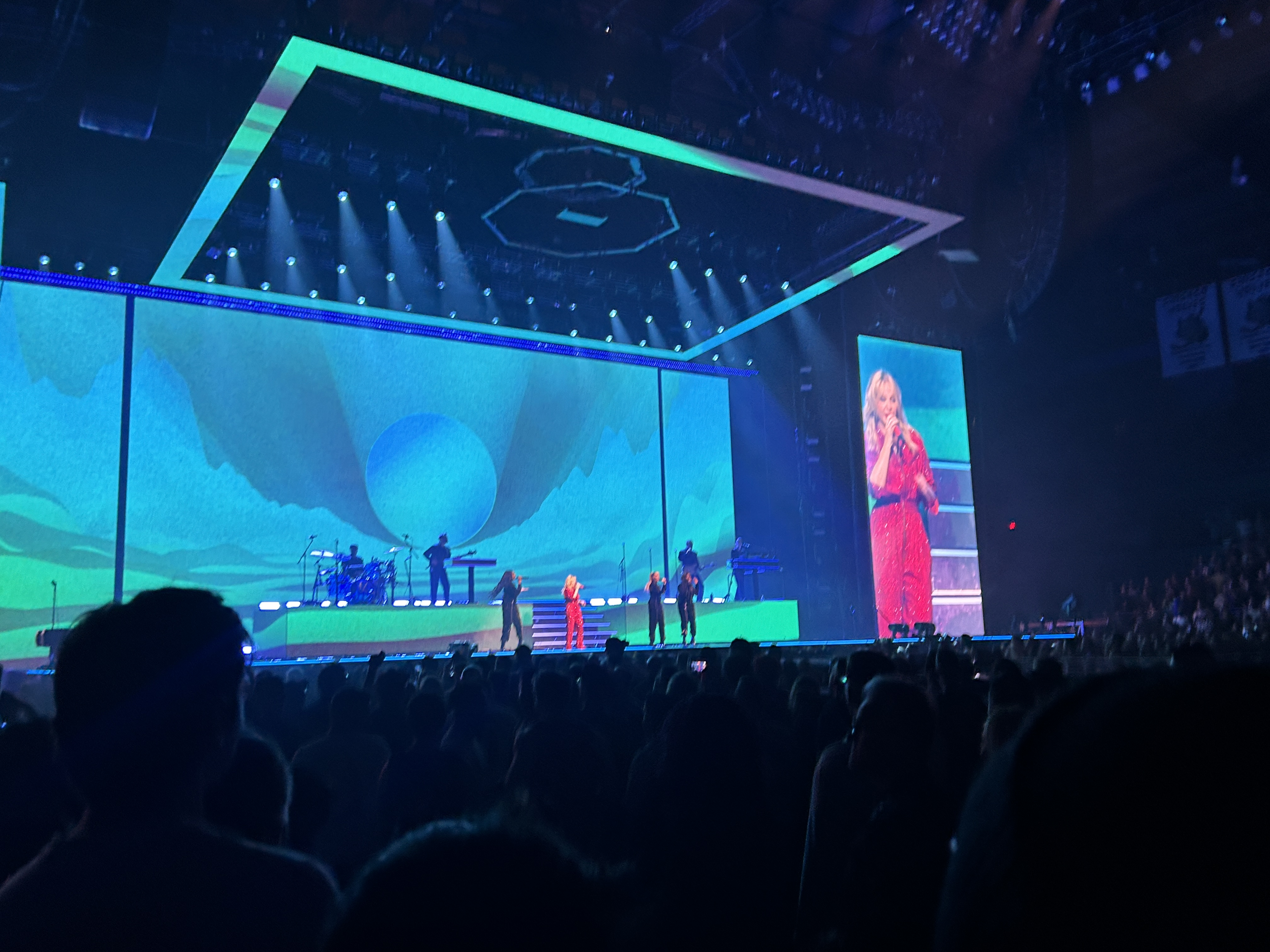
Minogue performing at Allstate Arena in Illinois, the tour's first stop in the United States

In January 2025, Consequence listed the tour on their list of the 34 Most Anticipated Tours of 2025. Paolo Ragusa remarked the North American leg would be "a golden opportunity to witness Kylie during the triumphant second wind of her career." Fiona Shepherd of The Scotsman also named the tour as one of her top ten "must-see gigs" for the year. In their review of opening night, The West Australian called the concert "jaw-dropping," while complimenting Minogue as "timeless". The Guardian rated the show five out of five stars, while complimenting that the tour "reminds us that Australia's queen of pop has always been a genius at reinvention." They further remarked the concert is "stuffed with preposterously catchy hit after preposterously catchy hit" and that the tour "is an excursion through every Kylie era". Rolling Stone Australia described the tour as an "electrifying performance," while noting the set list was "hit-packed" and "blended fresh material with beloved classics". In a review for The Note, Tobias Handke described Minogue as a "rare breed of performer who’s able to reinvent themselves throughout the decades without losing fans."

In a review for The Boston Globe, correspondent Marc Hirsh described Minogue as a "monarch holding court" and complimented her for "putting exclusively positive energy into the world for two hours". He further commented on the concert's set list, referring to it as "above sex, love, dancing" and "embracing the world with an open heart". Maya Shavit of Boston.com remarked that "[N]ostaglia was in full-force" during the concert. Collin Kelley of Rough Draft Atlanta described the show as "high-energy", while noting seeing her perform was "quite a thrill". Orlando Sentinel's Matthew J. Palm described Minogue as bringing her "upbeat brand of dancefloor pop" that brought "radiant joy that only a perfect pop moment, in the hands of an expert performer, can deliver". Austin American-Statesman's Eric Webb described Minogue as a "seasoned performer", an "international fashion icon", and described the concert's staging as "high-caliber". In their review, the Vancouver Sun called Minogue "pop perfection", while concluding that the evening was full of "shiny, happy people and music".

=== United Kingdom ===
Stacey Mullen of the Glasgow Times, Claire Biddles of The Guardian, Kate French-Morris of The Telegraph, and Lisa Verrico of The Times gave the show five-star ratings. Mullen wrote that Minogue "delivered her masterclass in pop music". Biddles called the show a "thrilling reinvention" while referring to Minogue as a "pop deity"; French-Morris praised Minogue as a "formidably glamorous star and someone you feel you could have a cup of tea with" while heralding the show as a "high-budget masterclass in live pop". Verrico noted that while production of the show was not in the same vein as 2011's Aphrodite: Les Folies Tour, Minogue displayed "her best asset — a vast vault of frothy pop hits that have only improved with age." In a review for The Scotsman, Shepherd rated the concert four out of five stars, noting that while the show is "somewhat less spectacle than her blockbusting tours", Minogue's "genius for crowd engagement" was a positive.

Chronicle Live's Katie Collings, Manchester Evening News' Dianne Bourne, Liverpool Echo's Paul McAuley, and The Independent's Alim Kheraj also gave the show five-star ratings. Collings reviewed that Minogue "taught a masterclass in entertaining"; Bourne noted that the show showed Minogue "at the peak of her powers, without the need for showgirl feathers or a golden chariot ride." McAuley praised Minogue, stating the concert may have "seen the pop deity at her pinnacle", while believing she "stays true to her pop roots", and called the performance "second to none". Kheraj referred to the set list as "serotonin-boosting", while complimenting Minogue as "one of the greatest pop stars of all time". Louder Than War's Paul Clarke described the show as "one big party" with a "genuine sense of community where everyone is welcome, no matter who they are." Andrew Steel of The Yorkshire Post described the tour as having "sparks with a dash of spontaneity that cuts through the clamour and locates genuine emotional heft".

Vicky Jessop of the Evening Standard gave the concert a five-star rating following Minogue's first show at London's O_{2} Arena on 26 May. She heralded the concert as a "shot of glitter straight into the veins", while also stating to "bow down to the reigning queen of feelgood pop".The i Paper's Kate Solomon gave the concert a five-star rating, calling Minogue's performance at the O_{2} "pure euphoric joy". Nottingham Post's Kevin Cooper reviewed, "Backed by a tight band and a troupe of dancers, she kept the energy levels turned all the way up to ten for a two hour set". Birmingham Mail reporter Gurdip Thandi gave the show a five-star rating, reviewing, "Kylie seems to still be at the peak of her powers and, best of all, there seems to be much more to come from this five foot tall force of nature in the future". In their five-star review, Attitude referred to Minogue as "never anything less than perfect". Kitty Chrisp of Metro gave the concert a five-star rating, and reviewed, "In 2025, the 57-year-old is past, present and future. She is a chart-topping discography of pop, disco and even country-inspired bangers dating back to before the fall of the Berlin Wall".

=== Europe ===
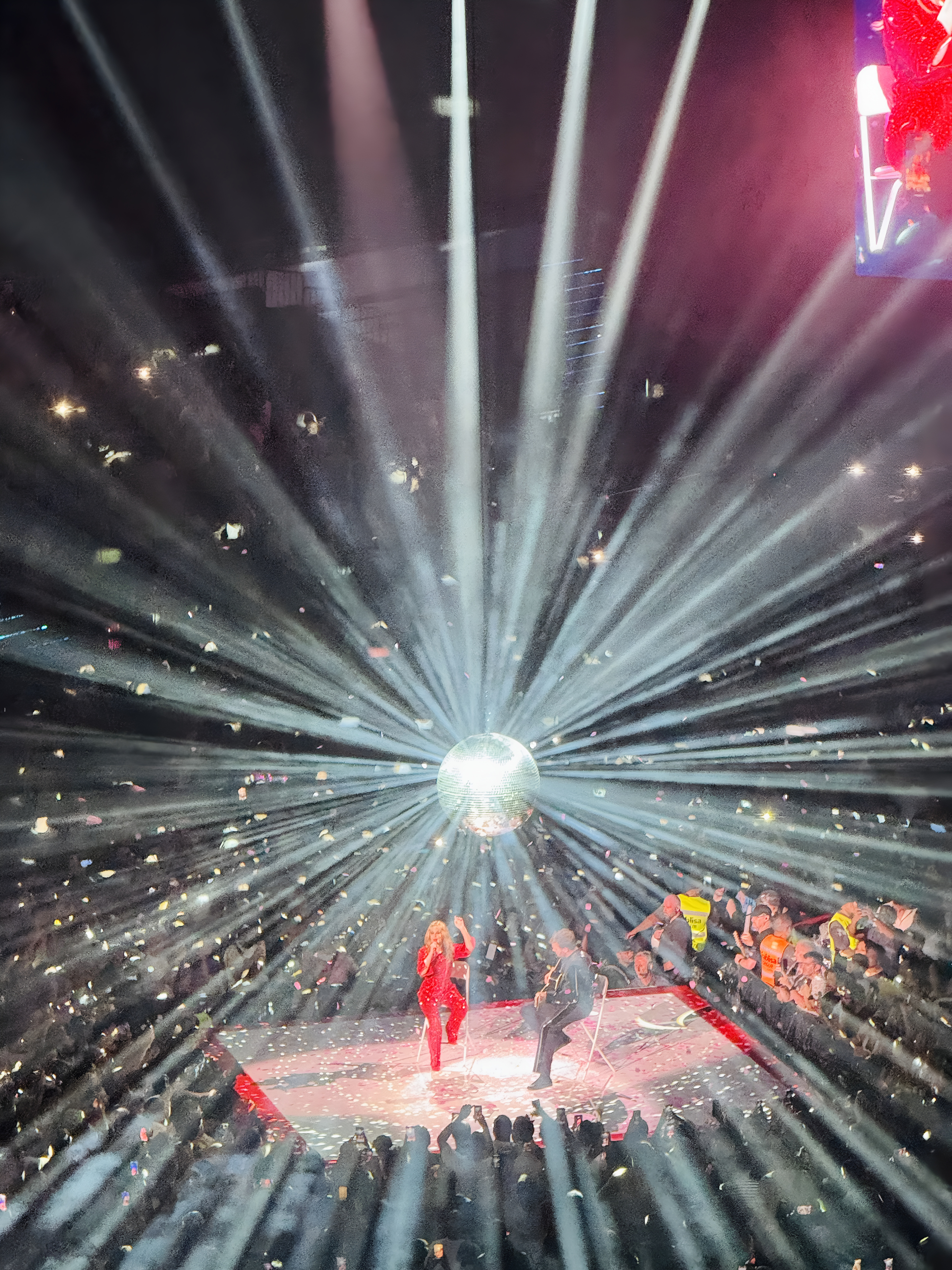
Minogue performing "Say Something" in Lisbon, Portugal

In their review, Svenska Yle stated: "Kylie Minogue has complete control over everything she does on stage and what she wants to express. It's spectacular, fun, sensual, human, divine and so good." In a four star review, Sara Martinsson of Dagens Nyheter stated: "Kylie Minogue sets the bar high and after an almost 40-year career can offer a show that is completely rooted in the present." In their review of the concert, Le Point wrote: "During a two-hour concert, spanning thirty-seven years of her career, the Australian proved that she remains the undisputed queen of pop." Julien Gonçalves, editor in chief of Pure Charts, reviewed that audiences "will be on their feet from the first to the last song of the concert, multiplying the ovations." In a review for Le Figaro, Léna Lutaud wrote, "Smiling, funny, and a good friend to the audience, Kylie Minogue is radiant and deeply likeable." Of Art's Lionel Baert complimented: "Pop, rap, country, electropop, dance, house, ballads... she synthesizes all genres with excellence."

Belgian blogger Robbie Allemeesch of Dansende Beren headlined that Minogue was a "[P]op star with class" and concluded their review remarking that "Antwerp broke the tension". In preparation of her shows in Spain and Portugal, respectively, Festivalea described the concert as "unmissable". In their review, Nyugat.hu praised: "Her energy, professionalism, kindness, and sense of what to adopt from the world's developing technology are what make her a truly great performer even today." Following Minogue's show in Berlin, press heralded her performance. B.Z. praised: "Star and fans are one heart and one soul. That's the Kylie effect"; television magazine Brandenburg aktuell wrote, "Full of energy, Kylie Minogue brings disco feeling, fast beats and her unmistakable charm to the Uber Arena."; and Berliner Morgenpost headlined: "Back on stage: The disco needs you, Kylie!" Following her 6 July performance at Hallenstadion, Le Matin reviewed: "Kylie occupied every corner of the venue. Her closeness was sincere, almost maternal. She delivered a near-perfect performance." German news publisher wa.de reviewed that Minogue "delivered a two-hour disco show and best-of set." Newspaper Rheinische Post wrote in their review: "Kylie Minogue performed well as a dark Diva. The darkest moment of the glamorous gala turned out to be the highlight." In their review of the concert, Le Progrès praised: "Everything works! She gave us a great time. Love at first sight!"

=== Festival performances ===
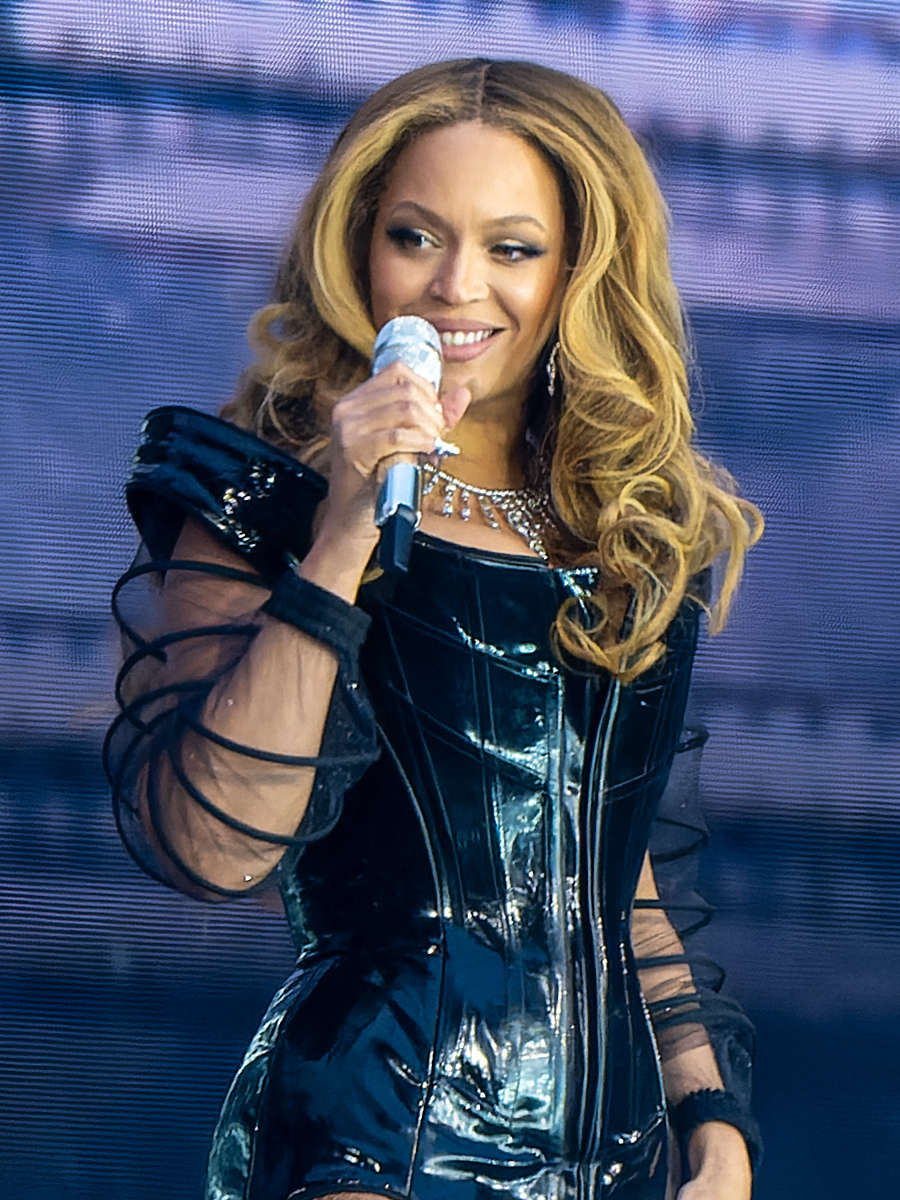
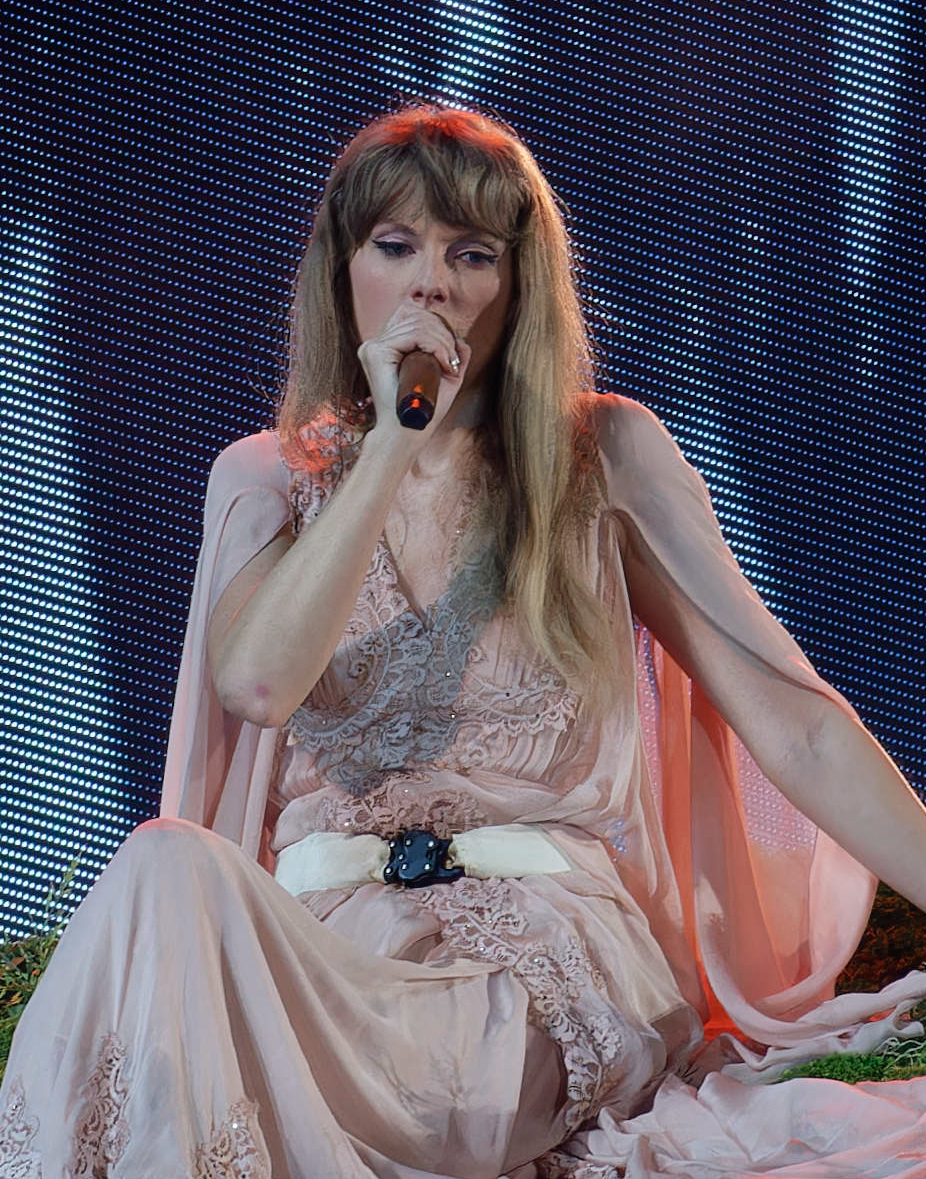
Critics called Minogue a "pioneer" in comparison to the likes of Beyoncé (left) and Taylor Swift (right)

Jesper Albæk Poulsen of Music Magazine and Alexander Vesterlund of Politiken gave Minogue's performance at the Tinderbox Festival five out of six stars, respectively. Poulsen complimented: "Kylie sang beautifully, oozed energy and had great audience interaction. She was so eternally cool that most of us can only dream of matching it." Vesterlund praised Minogue for "singing like a dream. She brought the generations together, and suddenly Tinderbox made sense." In response to her performance at Jazzopen Festival, Techkrams wrote: "Kylie presents her voice with impressive directness – no playback, no show effects, but singing with a real pull." Newspaper Reutlinger General-Anzeiger echoed the sentiments, complimenting Minogue for transforming the "courtyard of Stuttgart's New Palace into a large dance floor." Her concert at Bilbao BBK Live brought positive responses from several publications, including Deia, El Correo, El Mundo, and El Heraldo de Puebla, as well as Spanish radio network Kiss FM. Deia called her a "different kind of diva, rather elegant, sophisticated and glamorous... as well as a pioneer" in comparison to 2000s artists, such as Beyoncé and Taylor Swift, while placing her on par with the likes of Madonna. El Correro remarked that Minogue had "acted as a friendly diva and reviewed her career". El Mundo described Minogue as "an indisputable pop diva", while El Heraldo de Puebla complimented her for having "delivered a carefully curated musical and visual spectacle". Kiss FM described the show's choreography as impressive, noted the show's production and audiovisual display, and concluded the show was an "unforgettable experience".

Similar response was had following her show at Icónica Santalucia Sevilla Festival. Diario ABC headlined that Minogue had performed "the best closing party" for the festival. News agency EFE referred to Minogue as eternal, while reviewing: "It's a fact that Kylie Minogue is in top form, after more than 35 years of career." In a review for Diario de Sevilla José Miguel Carrasco wrote that "she knows, at 57, that she doesn't need extra embellishments to sustain this spectacular display, a true sensorial orgy." Cadena SER complimented the show's "exquisite staging" and made note of Minogue's seven costume changes. Their review concluded: "Catchy, danceable choruses are the formula for Kylie Minogue's success, which has turned Seville's Plaza de España into a nightclub and this year's Icónica Santalucía Sevilla Fest into a party, exceeding all expectations." Kiss FM echoed their previously-made statements, remarking the concert was "designed for dancing". Juan Sobrino of Cadena 100 wrote: "Kylie Minogue proves that, despite the passing of the years, she's still at the cutting edge without losing her essence." SAPO Mag noted that Minogue was "experiencing one of the most vibrant phases of an unusually long pop career [...] but one on which there's no sign of dust."

Minogue's performance at the Release Athens Festival continued to garner positive responses. Monopoli.gr editor Tatiana Georgakopoulou hailed her as the "star of the night", while referring to the event as "100 minutes of absolute tension at the biggest pop concert of the summer." Tania Skrapaliori of Athens Voice wrote: "At Release Athens 2025, Kylie Minogue gave and received what seems to be taken for granted in the pop scene live, but increasingly often isn't: joy and love." News24/7.gr wrote: "Her show was a non-stop party, with Kylie constantly smiling, interacting with the audience and together with her dancers they offered an adrenaline-filled performance. An audiovisual storm."

=== Latin America ===
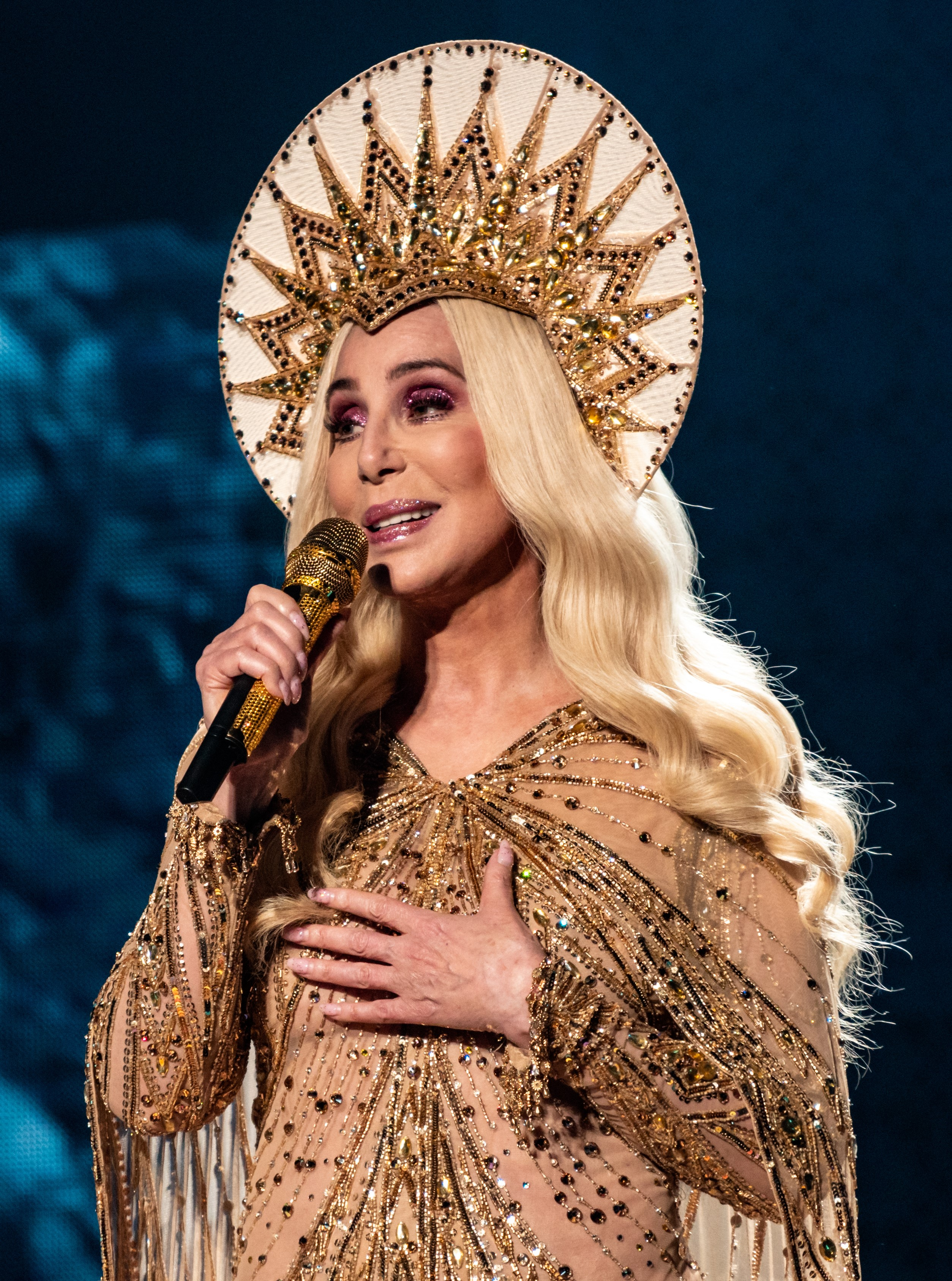
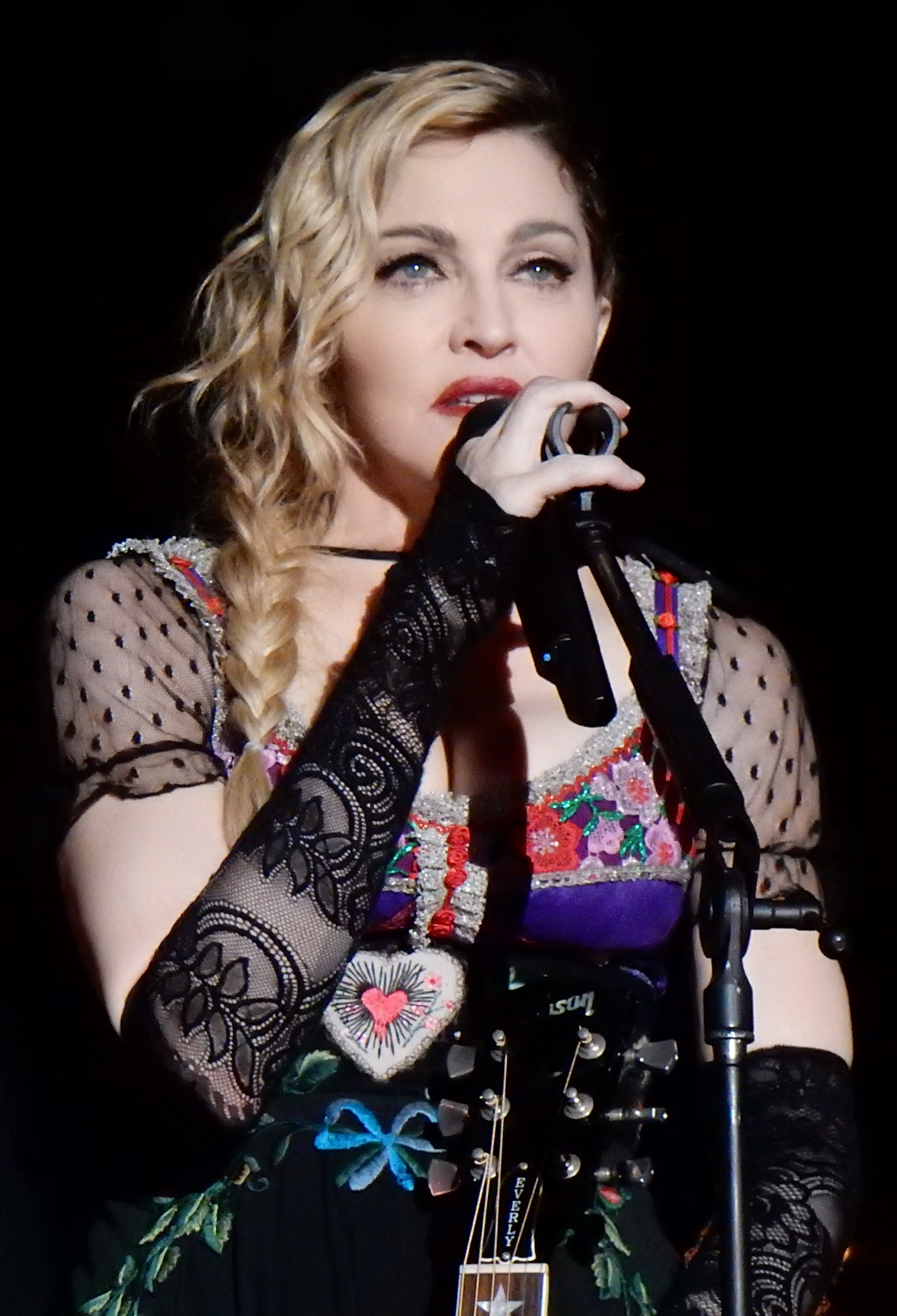
Following her concert in Buenos Aires, one reviewer described Minogue as constituting part of a "pop Holy Trinity" with the likes of Cher (left) and Madonna (right).

In review for La Nacion, Martín Artigas wrote, "Kylie isn't interested in nostalgia. It's no exaggeration to say that, 37 years after her first album, the goddess' music chooses to look forward rather than dwell on melancholy." Lo Que Va remarked that Minogue "gave a show that spanned her entire history." In their sub-headline, Billboard Argentina wrote: "The Australian singer returned to Argentina with a show that combines her artistic evolution, a recognition of maturity, and a strong commitment to LGBTQ+ culture." The publication also compared Minogue to the likes of Oasis, Katy Perry, and Swift, writing that those mentioned "usually review themselves through their greatest hits, she appears on stage with a look at both her past and her present. It's a reunion with her history and with a legion of followers who not only venerate her as a pop star, but also recognize her as an essential voice within queer culture." In their review, Argentine newspaper Pagina 12 noted that the spanned two-hours "without waste", while believing Minogue constituted a "pop Holy Trinity" with Cher and Madonna. "Not only did they know how to adapt to the passage of time and the advent of fashions, doing so with such astronomical intellect and intelligence that the trident ended up imposing the trend," Yumber Vera Rojas wrote, before concluding: "they also put their bodies to the test."

Chilean radio station Rock & Pop wrote that Minogue "spanned the 1980s through last year, with a level of excellence that's rare in pop [...] The audience was at boiling point even before a single note was played on stage." The Clinic noted that she received "constant applause" during the concert, while La Tercera professed they could not get Minogue out of their heads. In their review, Expectador noted Minogue for her "lively, agile, and danceable performance", while complimenting the use of resources during the evening's performance. Her concert in São Paulo received similar response. Hashtag Pop reviewed that the show showcased "Kylie Minogue at her best: dominating the stage, singing, dancing and connecting with the audience from start to finish." Papel Pop noted that Minogue "remains at her creative and performing peak, singing, dancing, and commanding the stage masterfully." Portal Leo Dias called it a "spectacle that reaffirmed Kylie Minogue's legacy", while also noting that is brought together "generations, a celebration of pop music, and proof that, at 56, she continues to set trends and inspire fans around the world." Similarly, Colombian radio networks responded positively to the concert. La FM noted that "[w]ith her energy, choreography, and repertoire, Kylie Minogue demonstrated why she remains a global music icon." Positiva FM wrote that the "atmosphere was simply magical, and the connection with her fans was instantaneous."

Minogue's concerts in Mexico—her first since the Aphrodite: Les Folies Tour (2011)—garnered critical acclaim. El Universal remarked that the tour "lived up to its name: a show full of electricity and joy that kept the excitement going from start to finish." The newspaper further noted the inclusion of the LGBTIQ+ community in the audience, echoing previous statements made by Billboard Argentina regarding her commitment to that community and its culture. In their headline, Excélsior exclaimed that Minogue delivered a "pop overdose", while praising that the concert "is precisely planned," noted that she is "considered one of the most successful artists in the world, but it's her, behind the star, the fun, down-to-earth, and attentive woman who captivated Mexico City residents." Similarly, La Razón's Carlos Aguillón felt the show reaffirmed Minogue's legacy, writing: "With nearly two hours of music, dancing, and boundless energy, Kylie Minogue sealed an unforgettable reunion with Mexico." In his review of the 22 August concert in Mexico City, Brian Ortiz of El Capitalino wrote that "[e]ach song was met with cheers that lasted several seconds," while noting that the reaction left Minogue with uncontainable surprise and emotion. Milenio reviewed that Minogue "delivered a truly packed show, with an impressive production and a repertoire packed with hits," while also declaring her the queen of electropop music. Following the final concert in Monterrey, press applauded Minogue for performance. Milenio's Uriel Reyna wrote that she "filled the Banamex Auditorium with music and eccentricity." Periódico ABC echoed those sentiments in their review, writing: "With this concert, Kylie Minogue reaffirmed her presence on the music scene and made it clear that her Tension Tour is a celebration that connects with audiences around the world." duardo Molina of El Norte wrote that the evening "will never be forgotten".

== Commercial performance ==
=== Box office ===
In a March 2025 report, Billboard reported that seven Australian concerts in February of the same year grossed US$10.9 million, with an attendance of 72,200. In addition, Minogue's three concerts in Melbourne at Rod Laver Arena grossed US$5.3 million, with 35,100 in attendance. The tour ranked as the eleventh top-performing tour on Billboard's May 2025 report of "Top Tours", earning US$14.9 million across eleven shows for the month of April. In their year-end report for 2025, Billboard acknowledged the tour as the thirty-third best of the year, generating US$78.4 million and attracting an audience of 576,000 across a reported 62 concerts; it was further named the seventh-highest-grossing pop tour for the year.

=== Venue records ===
Venue records
Period (2025)	Venue	Region	Description	Ref.
19–20 May	AO Arena	England	The female solo artist with the most appearances in the venue's history (33).	
26–27 May 2–3 June	The O_{2} Arena	England	The first female solo artist to perform a total of 21 times at the venue.	

== Live album and broadcast ==
On 27 August 2025, a recording of "Tension" (subtitled "live from the Tension Tour") was released to music download and streaming service platforms. Tension Tour//Live 2025 was announced the same day. The album was released to streaming services on 26 September of the same year, with a release in physical formats following on 13 February 2026. It debuted at number 58 on the ARIA Albums Chart, and peaked at number 14 in February 2026. In May of the same year, a concert documentary film, Kylie. Tension Tour Live, premiered on Netflix.

== Accolades ==
Accolades
Year	Organisation	Category	Result	Ref.
2025	ARIA Music Awards	Best Australian Live Act	Nominated	
2026	ARIA Music Awards	Best Pop Release	Pending	

== Set list ==
This set list is from the concert in Perth on 15 February 2025. It may not represent all concerts for the tour.

Act I

1. "Lights Camera Action"
2. "In Your Eyes"
3. "Get Outta My Way"
4. "What Do I Have to Do"
5. "Come into My World" (The Abbey Road Sessions version)
6. "Good as Gone"
7. "Spinning Around"

Act II

8. "Taboo" (pre-recorded)
9. "On a Night Like This"
10. "Better the Devil You Know"
11. "Shocked"
12. "I Believe in You"
13. "Things We Do for Love"
14. "The Loco-Motion"

Act III

15. "Hold on to Now"
16. "Last Night I Dreamt I Fell in Love"
17. "Where the Wild Roses Grow" (acapella)
18. Fan request
19. Fan request
20. "Say Something" (acoustic)
21. "Supernova" / "Real Groove" / "Monday Blues" / "Where Does the DJ Go?"

Act IV

22. "Last Night a D.J. Saved My Life" (Note: There are conflicting reports concerning the inclusion of "Last Night a D.J. Saved My Life" in the set list. Sources either include it as its own performance number or as part of the previously performed medley following "Where Does the DJ Go?"; other sources exclude it from the set list altogether.)
23. "Confide in Me"
24. "Slow"
25. "Timebomb"
26. "Edge of Saturday Night"

Act V

27. "Padam Padam"
28. "Can't Get You Out of My Head"
29. "All the Lovers"

Encore

30. "Tension"
31. "Love at First Sight"

=== Alterations ===
- During the 18 February 2025 concert in Adelaide, the first fan request was performed before "Where the Wild Roses Grow".
  - Beginning with this concert, "I Believe in You" was removed from the set list.
- Beginning with the 20 February 2025 concert in Melbourne, "Magic" was performed in replacement of "Monday Blues", and "Padam Padam" and "Tension" were performed in replacement of each other.
  - A second fan request was not performed at this concert.
- Beginning with the 17 April 2025 concert in Austin, "Dancing" was added to the set list, succeeding "Things We Do for Love".
- Beginning with the 23 June 2025 concert in Espoo, "Things We Do for Love" was removed from the set list. It was later returned to the set list.
- During the 27 June 2025 concert in Odense, "What Do I Have to Do", "Come Into My World", "Hold on to Now", "Last Night I Dreamt I Fell in Love", and "Where the Wild Roses Grow", as well as fan requests, were not performed.
- During the 9 July 2025 concert in Stuttgart, "What Do I Have to Do", "Come Into My World", "Hold on to Now", "Last Night I Dreamt I Fell in Love", the third act medley, "Timebomb", and "Edge of Saturday Night", as well as fan requests, were not performed.
- Beginning with the 7 August 2025 concert in Buenos Aires, "In My Arms" was added to the set list, and is performed between "Padam Padam" and "Love at First Sight".

=== Notes ===
- During the 2 May 2025 concert in Los Angeles, "Spinning Around" was performed with Ora.
- During the 31 May 2025 concert in Birmingham, "Shocked" was performed with Jazzi P.

=== Fan requests ===
- 15 February 2025 – Perth: "Limbo", "Breathe" and "I Should Be So Lucky"
- 18 February 2025 – Adelaide: "Please Stay" and "I Should Be So Lucky"
- 20 February 2025 – Melbourne: "Did It Again"
- 26 February 2025 – Brisbane: "Enjoy Yourself" and "Did It Again"
- 10 March 2025 – Bangkok: "Please Stay" and "I Should Be So Lucky"
- 5 April 2025 – New York City: "Wow", "Golden", "New York City" and "Story"
- 9 April 2025 – Boston: "Dancing"
- 11 April 2025 – Atlanta: "I Should Be So Lucky" and "Dance Floor Darling"
- 17 April 2025 – Austin: "Into the Blue", "In My Arms" and "Wow"
- 22 April 2025 – San Francisco: "2 Hearts", "Your Disco Needs You", "I Should Be So Lucky" and "Somebody to Love"
- 25 April 2025 – Seattle: "Red Blooded Woman"
- 16 May 2025 – Glasgow: "Breathe", "Never Too Late", and "Paper Dolls"
- 19 May 2025 – Manchester: "Wouldn't Change a Thing" and "Tears on My Pillow"
- 22 May 2025 – Liverpool: "Wouldn't Change a Thing" and "Tears on My Pillow"
- 23 May 2025 – Sheffield: "Je ne sais pas pourquoi", "In My Arms" and "2 Hearts"
- 26 May 2025 – London: "What Kind of Fool" and "I Should Be So Lucky"
- 30 May 2025 – Nottingham: "Dreams", "Dance Floor Darling" and "Midnight Ride"
- 31 May 2025 – Birmingham: "Especially for You", "Je ne sais pas pourquoi" and "Never Too Late"
- 3 June 2025 – London: "Hand on Your Heart", "Je ne sais pas pourquoi" and "Midnight Ride"
- 23 June 2025 – Espoo: "Turn It into Love", "I Believe in You" and "Wow"
- 29 June 2025 – Paris: "Need You Tonight", "Turn It into Love" and "Wow"
- 1 July 2025 – Antwerp: "Wow"
- 6 July 2025 – Zurich: "Your Disco Needs You" and "2 Hearts"
- 15 July 2025 – Lisbon: "Into the Blue" and "Wow"
- 12 August 2025 – Santiago: "Wow"
- 15 August 2025 – São Paulo: "The One" and "Wow"
- 22 August 2025 – Mexico City: "I Believe in You" and "The One"
- 24 August 2025 – Zapopan (Note: Labelled as Guadalajara in promotional material.): "Chocolate", "Into the Blue", and "I Believe in You"
- 26 August 2025 – Monterrey: "The One"

== Tour dates ==
List of 2025 concerts
Date (2025)	City	Country	Venue	Supporting acts	Attendance	Revenue
15 February	Perth	Australia	RAC Arena	Mallrat	13,064 / 13,064	$1,673,564
18 February	Adelaide	Australia	Adelaide Entertainment Centre	Mallrat	7,836 / 7,836	$1,211,725
20 February	Melbourne	Australia	Rod Laver Arena	Mallrat	35,089 / 35,089	$5,335,166
21 February	Melbourne	Australia	Rod Laver Arena	Mallrat	35,089 / 35,089	$5,335,166
22 February	Melbourne	Australia	Rod Laver Arena	Mallrat	35,089 / 35,089	$5,335,166
26 February	Brisbane	Australia	Brisbane Entertainment Centre	Mallrat	17,031 / 17,031	$2,694,953
27 February	Brisbane	Australia	Brisbane Entertainment Centre	Mallrat	17,031 / 17,031	$2,694,953
1 March	Sydney	Australia	Qudos Bank Arena	Mallrat	34,872 / 34,872	$4,999,744
2 March	Sydney	Australia	Qudos Bank Arena	Mallrat	34,872 / 34,872	$4,999,744
3 March	Sydney	Australia	Qudos Bank Arena	Mallrat	34,872 / 34,872	$4,999,744
10 March	Bangkok	Thailand	Paragon Hall	—N/a	3,415 / 3,415	$602,810
12 March	Tokyo	Japan	Ariake Arena	—N/a	7,211 / 7,211	$1,073,660
15 March	Kaohsiung	Taiwan	Kaohsiung Arena	—N/a	10,259 / 10,259	$1,280,807
29 March	Toronto	Canada	Scotiabank Arena	Romy	11,564 / 12,793	—
30 March	Montreal	Canada	Bell Centre	Romy	6,568 / 7,743	$631,502
2 April	Rosemont (Note: Labelled as Chicago in promotional material.)	United States	Allstate Arena	Romy	8,824 / 9,305	—
4 April	New York City	United States	Madison Square Garden	Romy	24,221 / 24,221	$2,959,554
5 April	New York City	United States	Madison Square Garden	Romy	24,221 / 24,221	$2,959,554
8 April	Washington, D.C.	United States	Capital One Arena	Romy	8,964 / 9,688	—
9 April	Boston	United States	TD Garden	Romy	8,327 / 9,300	—
11 April	Atlanta	United States	State Farm Arena	Rita Ora	5,000 / 7,942	$649,552
13 April	Orlando	United States	Kia Center	Rita Ora	5,763 / 7,790	—
14 April	Miami	United States	Kaseya Center	Rita Ora	8,025 / 10,633	—
17 April	Austin	United States	Moody Center	Rita Ora	7,714 / 9,892	$882,716
19 April	Phoenix	United States	PHX Arena	Rita Ora	5,303 / 9,627	$828,190
22 April	San Francisco	United States	Chase Center	Rita Ora	6,399 / 7,842	—
25 April	Seattle	United States	Climate Pledge Arena	Rita Ora	8,803 / 10,244	—
26 April	Vancouver	Canada	Pacific Coliseum	Rita Ora	6,182 / 6,689	—
2 May	Los Angeles	United States	Crypto.com Arena	Rita Ora	12,229 / 12,229	$1,654,074
16 May	Glasgow	Scotland	OVO Hydro	Jodie Harsh	—	—
17 May	Newcastle	England	Utilita Arena	Jodie Harsh	8,398 / 8,398	$1,249,443
19 May	Manchester	England	AO Arena	Jodie Harsh	—	—
20 May	Manchester	England	AO Arena	Jodie Harsh	—	—
22 May	Liverpool	England	M&S Bank Arena	Jodie Harsh	8,644 / 8,644	$1,276,246
23 May	Sheffield	England	Utilita Arena	Jodie Harsh	11,636 / 11,636	$1,724,021
26 May	London	England	The O_{2} Arena	Jodie Harsh	—	—
27 May	London	England	The O_{2} Arena	Jodie Harsh	—	—
30 May	Nottingham	England	Motorpoint Arena Nottingham	Jodie Harsh	6,892 / 6,892	$1,123,400
31 May	Birmingham	England	Bp pulse LIVE	Jodie Harsh	11,478 / 11,478	$1,778,171
2 June	London	England	The O_{2} Arena	Jodie Harsh	—	—
3 June	London	England	The O_{2} Arena	Jodie Harsh	—	—
5 June	Birmingham	England	Bp pulse LIVE	Jodie Harsh	—	—
6 June	Glasgow	Scotland	OVO Hydro	Jodie Harsh	10,450 / 10,597	$1,642,257
23 June	Espoo	Finland	Espoo Metro Areena	Jodie Harsh	—	—
25 June	Stockholm	Sweden	Avicii Arena	Jodie Harsh	—	—
27 June (Note: This concert was part of Tinderbox Festival 2025.)	Odense	Denmark	Tusindårsskoven	Jodie Harsh	—N/a	—N/a
29 June	Paris	France	Accor Arena	Jodie Harsh	—	—
1 July	Antwerp	Belgium	Sportpaleis	Jodie Harsh	—	—
3 July	Amsterdam	Netherlands	Ziggo Dome	Jodie Harsh	—	—
4 July (Note: The 4 July 2025 concert was originally scheduled for 16 June, but was postponed due to laryngitis.)	Berlin	Germany	Uber Arena	Jodie Harsh	–	–
6 July	Zurich	Switzerland	Hallenstadion	Jodie Harsh	—	—
7 July	Düsseldorf	Germany	PSD Bank Dome	Jodie Harsh	—	—
9 July (Note: This concert was part of Jazzopen Festival 2025.)	Stuttgart	Germany	Schlossplatz	Jodie Harsh	—N/a	—N/a
10 July	Décines-Charpieu (Note: Labelled as Lyon in promotional material.)	France	LDLC Arena	Jodie Harsh	—	—
12 July (Note: This concert was part of Bilbao BBK Live 2025.)	Bilbao	Spain	Mount Cobetas	Jodie Harsh	—N/a	—N/a
14 July (Note: This concert was part of Icónica Santalucia Sevilla Festival.)	Seville	Spain	Plaza de España	Jodie Harsh	—N/a	—N/a
15 July	Lisbon	Portugal	MEO Arena	Jodie Harsh	—	—
18 July (Note: This concert was part of Release Athens Festival.)	Athens	Greece	Plateia Nerou	—N/a	—N/a	—N/a
7 August	Buenos Aires	Argentina	Movistar Arena	—N/a	—	—
9 August	San Francisco de Mostazal	Chile	Gran Arena Monticello	—N/a	—	—
12 August	Santiago	Chile	Movistar Arena	—N/a	10,917 / 11,211	$882,010
15 August	São Paulo	Brazil	Ginásio do Ibirapuera	—N/a	—	—
19 August	Bogotá	Colombia	Movistar Arena	—N/a	—	—
22 August	Mexico City	Mexico	Palacio de los Deportes	—N/a	—	—
24 August	Zapopan	Mexico	Auditorio Telmex	—N/a	—	—
26 August	Monterrey	Mexico	Auditorio Banamex	—N/a	—	—
Total					331,078 / 353,541 (94%)	$36,153,565

=== Cancelled concerts ===
List of cancelled concerts
Date (2025)	City	Country	Venue	Reason	Ref.
17 March	Pasay (Note: Labelled as Manila in promotional material.)	Philippines	SM Mall of Asia Arena	Undisclosed	
18 June	Łódź	Poland	Atlas Arena	Laryngitis	
20 June	Kaunas	Lithuania	Žalgiris Arena	Laryngitis	
21 June	Tallinn	Estonia	Unibet Arena	Laryngitis	
29 April	Denver	United States	Ball Arena	Scheduling conflict with the 2025 NBA playoffs	
9 August	Montevideo	Uruguay	Antel Arena	Logistical reasons	
