= Edge of Saturday Night =

2024 single by The Blessed Madonna and Kylie Minogue

Single by the Blessed Madonna and Kylie Minogue

from the album Godspeed
- Released: August 14, 2024
- Studio: Godsquad Studios (London, England); Strongroom Studios (London, England); The Roundhouse Studio (Essex, England)
- Genre: Dance-pop
- Length: 3:26
- Label: Warner; Margeverse
- Songwriters: Kylie Minogue; Janée Bennett; Marea Stamper; Rachel Keen
- Producers: Dance System; Pat Alvarez; The Blessed Madonna

The Blessed Madonna singles chronology
"Count on My Love" (2024)	"Edge of Saturday Night" (2024)

Kylie Minogue singles chronology
"My Oh My" (2024)	"Edge of Saturday Night" (2024)	"Lights Camera Action" (2024)

Music video
- "Edge of Saturday Night" on YouTube

"Edge of Saturday Night" is a song by American DJ and producer the Blessed Madonna and Australian singer-songwriter Kylie Minogue. It was released on August 14, 2024, through Warner Music UK and Margeverse Limited. It is the third single from the former's debut studio album, Godspeed, which was released in October 2024. It is also included on Minogue's seventeenth studio album, Tension II (2024).

== Background and release ==
The idea for "Edge of Saturday Night" first came about in 2020. The Blessed Madonna shared, "When I was given the opportunity to begin an album, we were on the edge of lockdown. When I sat down to write lyrics for the very first time, I was on the edge of a brand new life. When I programmed and wrote the music that would become this song, I was on the edge of the next big leap into producing. It's fitting that this song is about an equally important edge in my life. It was a morning that magically turned into night. It was a dawn when instead of the party ending, we shut the blinds and began again… But that's just where the story begins. You see, then there was Kylie. Yes, THE Kylie. When she came into my life through this song, it was even more surprising than dawn turning to dusk. She breathed an energy into Edge and into me. So here we are together, Marge and Kiki… and all of you are invited."

On September 16, 2024, it was announced that "Edge of Saturday Night" would be released on 12" vinyl, limited to 1,159 copies worldwide, on October 31.

== Composition ==
"Edge of Saturday Night" was written by Kylie Minogue, Jin Jin, The Blessed Madonna and Raye, and was produced by Dance System, Pat Alvarez and The Blessed Madonna.

== Promotion ==
=== Music videos ===
An official lyric video was released to YouTube on the same day as the single.

The official music video of the song directed by Sophie Muller was published on Minogue's YouTube channel on August 23, 2024.

=== Live performances ===
The Blessed Madonna and Minogue first performed the track at Pikes Hotel, Ibiza.

Minogue headlined Electric Picnic 2024, performing "Edge Of Saturday Night" with The Blessed Madonna onstage. In February 2025, Minogue embarked on the Tension Tour, and included the song as part of the set list.

== Track listing ==
Digital download, streaming

1. "Edge of Saturday Night" – 3:26

Digital download, streaming – Extended

1. "Edge of Saturday Night" (extended) – 4:07
2. "Edge of Saturday Night" – 3:26

Digital download, streaming – Nikki Nair remix

1. "Edge of Saturday Night" (Nikki Nair remix) – 3:59
2. "Edge of Saturday Night" – 3:26

12" vinyl

1. "Edge of Saturday Night" (extended) – 4:07
2. "Edge of Saturday Night" (Nikki Nair remix)
3. "Edge of Saturday Night" (Hannah Holland remix)
4. "Edge of Saturday Night" (Michelle Manetti remix)

== Charts ==
Chart performance for "Edge of Saturday Night"
Chart (2024–2025)	Peak position
Estonia Airplay (TopHit)	86
Germany Download (GfK)	69
Italy Airplay (Radiomonitor)	24
Italy Independent (Radiomonitor)	5
New Zealand Hot Singles (RMNZ)	35
San Marino Airplay (SMRTV Top 50)	22
Serbia Airplay (Radiomonitor)	19
UK Singles Downloads (Official Charts)	16
UK Singles Sales (OCC)	17

== Release history ==
Release dates and formats for "Edge of Saturday Night"
Region	Date	Format(s)	Version	Label	Ref.
Various	August 14, 2024	Digital download; streaming	Original	Warner; Margeverse Limited	
Various	August 30, 2024	Digital download; streaming	Extended	Warner; Margeverse Limited	
Various	September 13, 2024	Digital download; streaming	Nikki Nair remix	Warner; Margeverse Limited	
Various	October 31, 2024	12" vinyl	Extended remixes	Warner; Margeverse Limited	
