= My Oh My (Kylie Minogue, Bebe Rexha and Tove Lo song) =

2024 single by Kylie Minogue, Bebe Rexha and Tove Lo

Single by Kylie Minogue, Bebe Rexha and Tove Lo
- Released: 11 July 2024
- Studio: Rokstone Studios (London, England); Glenwood Place Studios (Burbank, CA); MXM Studios (Los Angeles, CA)
- Genre: Dance-pop
- Length: 3:01
- Label: Darenote; BMG
- Songwriters: Ina Wroldsen; Tove Lo; Steve Mac
- Producer: Steve Mac

Kylie Minogue singles chronology
"Midnight Ride" (2024)	"My Oh My" (2024)	"Edge of Saturday Night" (2024)

Bebe Rexha singles chronology
"I'm the Drama" (2024)	"My Oh My" (2024)	"Dollars And Dimes" (2025)

Tove Lo singles chronology
"Heat" (2024)	"My Oh My" (2024)	"Cave" (2024)

Music video
- "My Oh My" on YouTube

"My Oh My" is a song by Australian singer Kylie Minogue, American singer Bebe Rexha and Swedish singer Tove Lo. It was released on streaming platforms on 11 July 2024, by BMG and Minogue's company Darenote, and further distributed in digital and physical formats. It is Minogue's first new material since the singles of her sixteenth studio album, Tension (2023), and appears on her seventeenth studio album, Tension II (2024). Ina Wroldsen and Lo wrote the song, with Steve Mac co-writing and producing. It also inspired the Gemini zodiac aesthetic of the album cover and title for Tension II.

Musically, "My Oh My" is a dance-pop song with club elements. Lyrically, it discusses flirtation, with each singer using their astrological sign throughout the lyrics to playfully introduce themselves to a potential lover. Some reviewers drew parallels with Minogue's previous singles "Can't Get You Out of My Head" (2001) and "Padam Padam" (2023). Music critics praised "My Oh My" for its catchiness, dance-oriented sound, and efforts by both Rexha and Lo.

Commercially, "My Oh My" appeared on component charts in Australia, Europe, New Zealand, South America, the United Kingdom, and the United States. Charlie Di Placido directed the music video, which features all three singers and additional background dancers at the English stately home Syon House in Brentford, the London residence of the Duke of Northumberland. To promote the song, all three singers performed it at BST Hyde Park, with Minogue as the headliner.

== Background ==
On 22 September 2023, Minogue released her sixteenth studio album, Tension. It debuted to critical and commercial success with her singles "Padam Padam", "Tension" and "Hold On to Now", the first of which became a sleeper hit and viral sensation. She performed several live shows to promote the album before beginning her More Than Just a Residency at the Voltaire in Las Vegas on 3 November, that year. Variety reported in January 2024 that Minogue would repackage Tension with new material, and she hinted at working on new music at the 66th Annual Grammy Awards in February. On 8 July, she announced new material on social media, including a pre-save link titled "MOM". Later, she and singers Bebe Rexha and Tove Lo shared separate social media posts featuring similar descriptions of each other. On 11 July, Minogue announced the single "My Oh My" (originally abbreviated as "MOM") via social media. This is Minogue's third consecutive collaboration, following "Midnight Ride" with South African singer Orville Peck and American producer Diplo and "Dance Alone" with Australian singer Sia. Minogue previously worked with Lo on her single "Really Don't Like U" from her album Sunshine Kitty (2019), and this is Minogue and Rexha's first collaboration, though they met at the Billboard Women in Music Awards on 7 March 2024.

== Composition ==
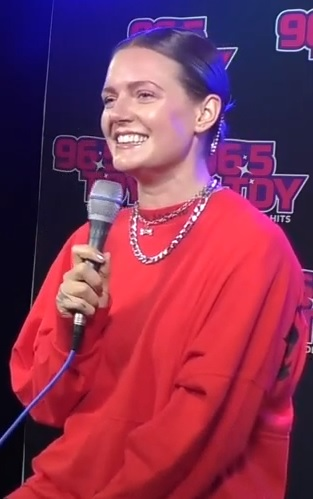
"My Oh My" is Minogue's second collaboration with Swedish singer-songwriter Tove Lo (pictured).

"My Oh My" was written by Ina Wroldsen and Lo, with Steve Mac co-writing and producing. Musically, it is a dance-pop song with club influences and a tempo of 124 beats per minute. Murray Chalmer's press release identified the song's "nod to the unmistakable Kylie 'la la la' refrain, a thumping bass line" and "playful lyrics", later adding that it is "destined to be a summer dance floor favourite". According to Billboard, the song "lifts a few notches with its slappy, ready-for-the-club beat", and Rolling Stone writer Daniel Kreps describes it as a "dance-floor ready dance-pop track." Variety editor Thania Garcia praised the "thumping and dance floor-ready beat" and "playful deliveries" set against an "irresistible pop rhythm". According to Jessica Lynch of Rolling Stone Australia, the song "features Kylie's signature 'la la la' hooks, a catchy bassline, and playful lyrics that make it an instant dance floor anthem".

Lyrically, the song touches on flirtation, with the lyrics "When you asked/What's your name?/What's your sign?"I'm Kylie, it's Gemini/What's your drink?/Let me buy/You had me when you said hi" as an example. Throughout the song, the three artists use their respective astrological signs: Gemini (Minogue), Virgo (Rexha), and Scorpio (Lo).

== Release and promotion ==
"My Oh My" debuted on streaming platforms on 11 July, followed by digital platforms the following day. It debuted on BBC Radio 2's The Zoe Ball Breakfast Show and was also aired on BBC Radio Shropshire that day. The next day, it was distributed on Minogue's website in three physical versions: a CD single, a cassette tape, and a violet-coloured 7-inch vinyl record, all of which included an extended version of the song. The digital extended play includes the original and extended mixes, as well as remixes from Franklin, CLIK3D, and TORQ. To promote the song, Minogue headlined the BST Hyde Park show on 13 July, performing "My Oh My" for the first time as part of her career-spanning set, with Rexha and Lo joining her onstage.

== Critical reception ==
“My Oh My” received positive reviews from music critics. Billboard writer Lars Brandle described the song as a "sophisticated and polished shot of pop", while Clash editor Robin Murray called it a "fun, frisky pop belter, a song that exudes femme energy from first note to last." Murray praised Rexha and Lo's work on the song, describing it as "a track that feels camp, contagious, and totally thrilling." Abby Jones, a Stereogum contributor, described it as a "classic lust-on-the-dance-floor tune". Classic Pop editor Dan Biggane wrote that the song is "destined to be a summer dance floor favourite", while The Standard writer Nuray Bulbul praised its "enticing pop beat" with "lighthearted rhymes about their zodiac signs". Nmesoma Okechukwu of Euphoria described the song as a "hot dance track" after praising its catchiness and each of the singer's delivery, while Kitty Robison of Notion described it as "electrifying". People dubbed it a "catchy, flirtatious pop banger" and praised the singer's lyrical nod to "Can't Get You Out of My Head", while Taylor Henderson of Out described it as a "glitzy pop-dance song that will surely give the gays everything they want". Paper editor Shaad D'Souza included it on their list of 10 Songs You Need To Hear, calling it "charming and unapologetically silly", as well as a "perfect late-summer confection". The song was included in The Times' list of the best songs of 2024, and Pip Ellwood-Hughes of Entertainment Focus selected it as one of the songs they expected to hear during Minogue's appearance at BST Hyde Park on July 13.

Alim Kheraj of Attitude wrote that it "provides the same sugary high as guzzling a bottle of White Zinfandel at a Pride afterparty", whereas Neil Z. Yeung of AllMusic described the track as a "slow-grower whose charm increases with each subsequent listen as the trio does a roll call on playful verses". Quentin Harrison of The Line of Best Fit labelled all collaborative efforts as "masterjams", finding Minogue's collaboration with each artist "compelling," while Lauren Murphy of The Irish Times described "My Oh My" and album track "Dance Alone" as "undeniably catchy, danceable affairs." Talia M. Wilson of Riff described the song as "flirtatious," but criticised Minogue's "modulated" vocals and the singers' slightly similar delivery during verses. John Earls of Classic Pop thought the collaborative efforts were "padding" the record, while Helen Brown of The Independent thought it was "forgettable".

== Commercial performance ==
In Australia, "My Oh My" debuted at number 17 on the regional Artists Singles chart and first on the Independent Singles chart. In New Zealand, it debuted at number 21 on the Hot Singles Chart. In the United Kingdom, the song debuted at number 63 on the UK Singles Chart, number 11 on the Indie Singles chart, two on the Download Singles chart, and number one on the Physical Singles and Singles Sales charts. In the United States, the song debuted at number six on the Dance/Electronic Digital Songs chart before peaking at number 33 on the Dance/Electronic Songs chart. In Europe, the song peaked at number 76 in Estonia and 45 in Lithuania, while in South America, it reached number 15 in Costa Rica, number 13 in Mexico, and number 5 in Nicaragua.

== Music video ==
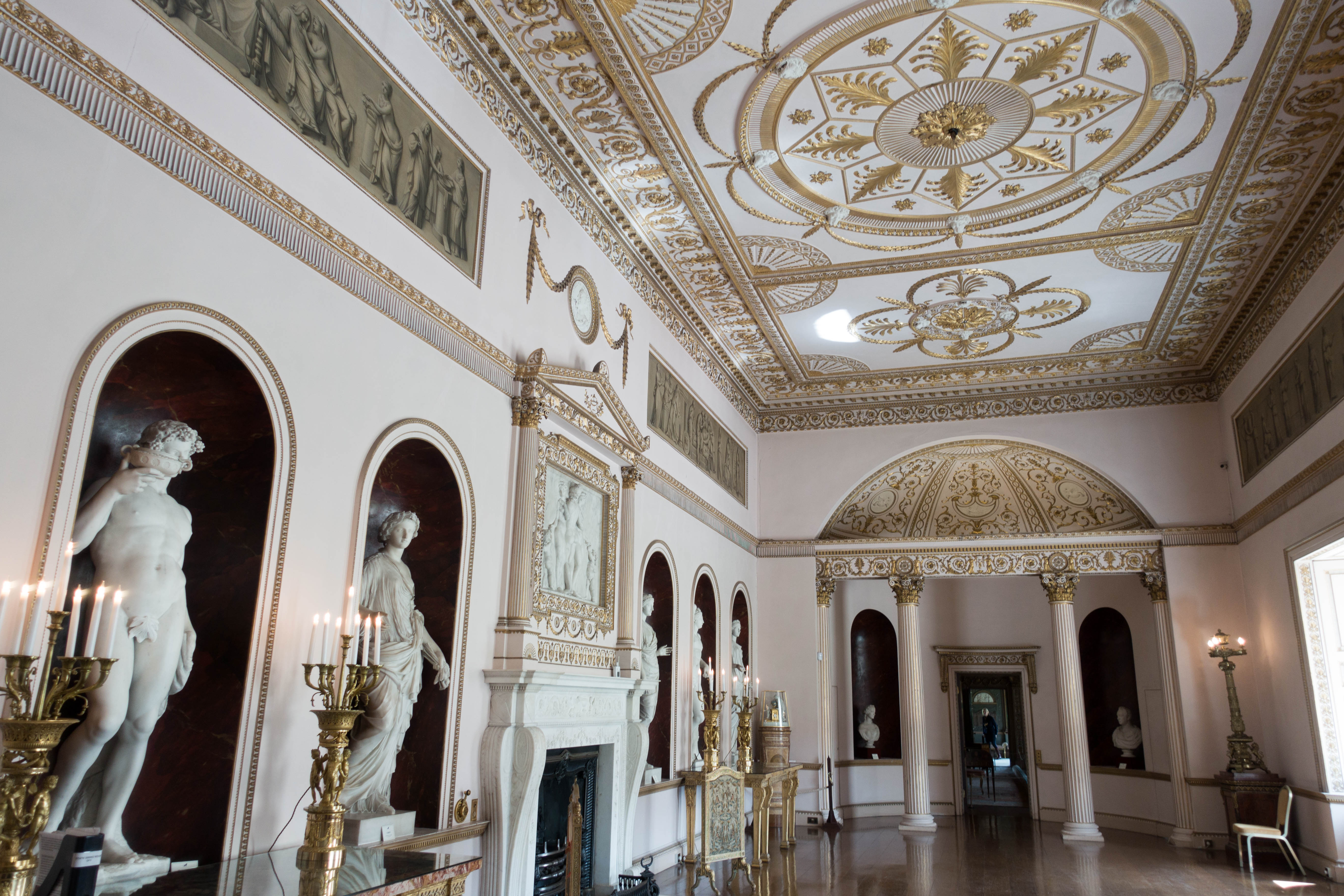
The music video for "My Oh My" was filmed on location at Syon House in Brentford.

The visualiser for "My Oh My" was added to Minogue's YouTube channel on the day of its release, and a lyric video was released on 20 July 2024. Charlie Di Placido directed the music video for the single, featuring all three singers. The music video was shot on location at the English stately home Syon House in Brentford, the Duke of Northumberland's London home. According to Promonews writer Rob Ulitski, the video "features each of the artists in luxurious performance vignettes, surrounded by beautiful art and architecture." The video begins with Minogue lying in front of a golden sculpture surrounded by dancers. The video then shows Minogue and the dancers performing the song in a different setting. Rexha performs the song with the dancers in the following scene, before Minogue joins them in another location. It then shows Lo posing as a sculpture next to a staircase with the dancers. The final chorus features all three singers and the dancers, and it ends with Minogue and the dancers in a hallway. The music video premiered on Minogue's YouTube channel on 9 August. Ulitski praised Minogue's "glossy styling and playful vibes" throughout the video, stating that she is "cementing her icon status with each new video."

== Formats and track listing ==
Digital download, streaming

1. "My Oh My" – 3:01

CD single, cassette, 7-inch vinyl

1. "My Oh My" – 3:01
2. "My Oh My" (extended mix) – 4:03

Digital download, streaming – The Remixes

1. "My Oh My" – 3:01
2. "My Oh My" (extended mix) – 4:03
3. "My Oh My" (Franklin dream edit) – 2:53
4. "My Oh My" (Franklin remix) – 3:21
5. "My Oh My" (CLIK3D remix) – 3:09
6. "My Oh My" (TORQ remix) – 2:29

== Credits and personnel ==
Personnel

- Kylie Minogue – vocals
- Tove Lo – vocals, writing
- Bebe Rexha – vocals
- Ina Wroldsten – writing
- Steve Mac – writing, production

== Charts ==
=== Weekly charts ===
Weekly chart performance for "My Oh My"
Chart (2024)	Peak position
Australian Artist Singles (ARIA)	17
Australia Independent (AIR)	1
Costa Rica Anglo Airplay (Monitor Latino)	15
Estonia Airplay (TopHit)	76
Lithuania Airplay (TopHit)	45
Mexico Anglo Airplay (Monitor Latino)	13
New Zealand Hot Singles (RMNZ)	21
Nicaragua Anglo Airplay (Monitor Latino)	5
UK Indie (Official Charts)	11
UK Singles (Official Charts)	63
US Hot Dance/Electronic Songs (Billboard)	33

=== Monthly charts ===
Monthly chart performance for "My Oh My"
Chart (2024)	Position
Estonia Airplay (TopHit)	85

== Release history ==
Release dates and formats for "My Oh My"
Region	Date	Format	Label	Ref(s).
Various	11 July 2024	Streaming	Darenote; BMG	
Various	12 July 2024	CD single; CS; digital download	Darenote; BMG	
Various	25 July 2024	Digital EP	Darenote; BMG	
Various	9 August 2024	7-inch vinyl	Darenote; BMG	
