= Midnight Ride (song) =

2024 single by Orville Peck, Kylie Minogue and Diplo

Single by Orville Peck, Kylie Minogue and Diplo

from the album Stampede
- Released: 7 June 2024
- Studio: Lucy's Meat Market (Los Angeles, CA)
- Genre: Country-disco
- Length: 3:30
- Label: Warner
- Songwriters: Christopher Stracey; Kylie Minogue; Marta Cikojevic; Orville Peck
- Producers: Christopher Stracey; Diplo; Orville Peck; Picard Brothers

Orville Peck singles chronology
"Cowboys Are Frequently, Secretly Fond of Each Other" (2023)	"Midnight Ride" (2024)

Kylie Minogue singles chronology
"Dance Alone" (2024)	"Midnight Ride" (2024)	"My Oh My" (2024)

Diplo singles chronology
"Willing to Let You Go" (2024)	"Midnight Ride" (2024)	"Ultraman" (2024)

Lyric video
- "Midnight Ride" on YouTube

"Midnight Ride" is a song by South African country singer Orville Peck, Australian singer-songwriter Kylie Minogue and American producer Diplo. It was released on 7 June 2024 by Warner Records as a single from Peck's duet album Stampede. It is also included on Minogue's seventeenth studio album, Tension II (2024).

== Background and release ==
On 1 June 2024, Minogue quoted a tweet from Peck, posted 7 months prior, which sparked rumours of a possible collaboration between the two. Minogue previously experimented with country music on her 2018 album Golden which was recorded in Nashville. On 2 June during Minogue's headlining show at Outloud Music Festival at WeHo Pride, she invited Peck and Diplo on stage to perform "Midnight Ride" for the first time.

When introducing the song to the audience, Peck dubbed "Midnight Ride" a "disco-country song", blending elements of both himself and Minogue. Following the performance, pre-save links went live, and the song was released on 7 June 2024.

== Composition ==
"Midnight Ride" is a country-disco song written by Peck, Minogue, Christopher Stracey and Marta Cikojevic, while production was handled by Peck and Stracey, alongside Diplo and the Picard Brothers. Running for three minutes and thirty seconds, "Midnight Ride" features an "EDM festival-core whistle refrain" and "mechanical guitar chugs throughout"

== Personnel ==
- Orville Peck – songwriting, vocals, production
- Kylie Minogue – songwriting, vocals, vocal engineering
- Diplo – production, programming
- Christopher Stracey – songwriting, production, guitar, bass, baritone guitar, mellotron
- Picard Brothers – production
- Marta Cikojevic – songwriting, background vocals
- Benny Rock – Fender, Rhodes, keyboards
- Kane Ritchotte – drums, percussion
- Mark Stent – mixing engineer
- Pete Min – recording engineer
- Randy Merrill – mastering

== Charts ==
Chart performance for "Midnight Ride"
Chart (2024)	Peak position
New Zealand Hot Singles (RMNZ)	34
UK Singles Downloads (OCC)	7

== Release history ==
Release dates and formats for "Midnight Ride"
Region	Date	Format	Label	Ref.
Various	7 June 2024	Digital download; streaming	Warner	
