= Kylie Minogue singles discography =

- Minogue performing at the Tension Tour in 2025
- As lead artist: 88
- As featured artist: 8
- Charity singles: 9
- Promotional singles: 26
- Other charted songs: 12

The Australian singer Kylie Minogue has released eighty-eight singles as lead artist, eight singles as a featured artist, nine charity singles and twenty-six promotional recordings. Referred as the "Princess of Pop" by various media outlets, she has sold more than 80 million records worldwide. In Australia, she has a total of ten number-one singles, twenty-three top-ten hits and forty-seven top-forty entries. In the United Kingdom, she earned eight number-one singles, eleven singles that peaked at number two, thirty-seven top-ten hits and fifty-five top-forty entries.

Minogue's music career began as a result of her popularity as a cast member in the Australian soap opera Neighbours. After an impromptu performance with the cast of the show, she signed to Mushroom Records in 1987 and released a cover of the song "Locomotion" as her debut single. It spent seven weeks on top of the ARIA Singles Chart and became the highest-selling single of the 1980s in Australia. "I Should Be So Lucky", her second single, became a worldwide hit, topping the UK Singles Chart for five consecutive weeks. Later, in 1988, she signed with PWL Records and based herself in the UK as a result. Her debut album, Kylie, produced several singles including a re-recorded version of "Locomotion", "Got to Be Certain" and "Je ne sais pas pourquoi". Her 1989 second album, Enjoy Yourself earned UK number-ones such as "Hand on Your Heart" and "Tears on My Pillow". Minogue took a more mature turn with the 1990 release of "Better the Devil You Know" from her third album Rhythm of Love. Her fourth album, 1991's Let's Get to It, spawned the single "Word Is Out", which became her first single to miss the top ten in the UK. By 1992, she had completed her recording contract with PWL Records and decided not to renew it, after the compilation album Greatest Hits was released, and produced the lead single, "What Kind of Fool (Heard All That Before)".

In 1993, Minogue signed with Deconstruction Records. Her self-titled fifth studio album was released in 1994, along with the Australian number-one single "Confide in Me". Her 1997 sixth studio album, Impossible Princess, had all its singles fail to reach the top ten including the first single "Some Kind of Bliss". She was dropped by Deconstruction Records in 1998 due to low sales.

In 1999, Minogue signed with Parlophone Records. "Spinning Around", the lead single of her seventh studio album Light Years debuted at number one in the UK in 2000, making her the first female Australian singer to debut at number one in the UK. In 2001, she released the worldwide hit single, "Can't Get You Out of My Head", from her eighth studio album Fever, topping the charts in Australia, New Zealand, the UK and several countries in Europe. The 2002 single, "Come into My World", gave Minogue her first Grammy Award in 2004 for Best Dance Recording. In 2003, the single "Slow", from her ninth studio album Body Language, became a number-one single in the UK. In 2004, her compilation album Ultimate Kylie was released, featuring the single "I Believe in You", which reached number two in the UK. Following her recovery after being diagnosed with breast cancer in 2005, she released her tenth studio album X in 2007. It produced the Australian number-one single "2 Hearts". Her eleventh studio album, Aphrodite in 2010 spawned the UK top-three single, "All the Lovers". In 2014, she earned her final UK top-twenty single under Parlophone with "Into the Blue", taken from her twelfth studio album, Kiss Me Once. In 2015 and 2016, she released Christmas singles taken from her thirteenth studio album Kylie Christmas and its re-release, the Snow Queen Edition.

In 2017, Minogue signed with BMG Rights Management. Her fourteenth studio album, Golden was then released in 2018, with its lead single, "Dancing", a top-forty single in the UK. In 2020, her fifteenth studio album, Disco was led by the single "Say Something". In 2023, the release of "Padam Padam", the lead single of her sixteenth studio album Tension, earned her a top-twenty, top-forty and top-ten entry in Australia, Belgium, Ireland and the UK respectively in five consecutive decades. Her seventeenth album, 2024's Tension II featured "Lights Camera Action" as the lead single. In the UK, she is the only female artist to achieve a number-one single in four decades.

== As lead artist ==
=== 1980s ===
List of singles released in the 1980s decade as lead artist, with selected chart positions, sales and certifications, showing year released and originating album
Title	Year	Peak chart positions										Sales	Certifications	Album
Title	Year	AUS	AUT	BEL (FL)	FRA	GER	IRE	NZ	SWI	UK	US	Sales	Certifications	Album
"Locomotion" (Note: In 1987, Minogue first released the single, under the title "Locomotion". In 1988, she re-recorded the song and was titled "The Loco-Motion".)	1987	1	—	—	—	—	—	8	—	—	—		ARIA: Platinum; RMNZ: Gold	Non-album single
"I Should Be So Lucky"	1987	1	4	8	4	1	1	3	1	1	28	JPN: 30,140; UK: 702,850	ARIA: Platinum; BPI: Platinum; BVMI: Gold; SNEP: Silver	Kylie
"Got to Be Certain"	1988	1	—	17	9	6	4	2	8	2	—	UK: 315,000	ARIA: Gold; BPI: Silver; SNEP: Silver	Kylie
"The Loco-Motion"	1988	—	3	3	5	3	1	—	2	2	3	JPN: 24,530; UK: 434,000	BPI: Silver; RIAA: Gold	Kylie
"Je ne sais pas pourquoi"	1988	11	—	27	15	14	2	9	24	2	—	UK: 325,000	BPI: Silver	Kylie
"Especially for You" (with Jason Donovan)	1988	2	12	5	3	10	1	2	2	1	—	UK: 1,090,000	ARIA: Gold; BPI: Platinum; SNEP: Silver	Ten Good Reasons
"It's No Secret"	1988	—	—	—	—	—	—	47	—	—	37			Kylie
"Turn It into Love"	1988	—	—	—	—	—	—	—	—	—	—	JPN: 46,320		Kylie
"Hand on Your Heart"	1989	4	—	6	8	17	1	15	6	1	—	JPN: 9,000; UK: 494,000	ARIA: Gold; BPI: Gold	Enjoy Yourself
"Wouldn't Change a Thing"	1989	6	—	5	19	24	—	21	27	2	— (Note: "Wouldn't Change a Thing" did not enter the Billboard Hot 100; it peaked at number 83 on the US Cash Box Top 100.)	UK: 370,000	ARIA: Gold	Enjoy Yourself
"Never Too Late"	1989	14	—	4	26	45	1	27	23	4	—		BPI: Silver	Enjoy Yourself
"—" denotes a single that did not chart, or was not released in that territory.

=== 1990s ===
List of singles released in the 1990s decade as lead artist, with selected chart positions, sales and certifications, showing year released and originating album
Title	Year	Peak chart positions										Sales	Certifications	Album
Title	Year	AUS	AUT	BEL (FL)	FRA	GER	IRE	NZ	SWI	UK	US Dance	Sales	Certifications	Album
"Tears on My Pillow"	1990	20	—	9	—	31	2	23	—	1	—	UK: 260,000	BPI: Silver	Enjoy Yourself
"Better the Devil You Know"	1990	4	27	5	13	24	4	27	21	2	—	UK: 340,000	ARIA: Gold; BPI: Silver	Rhythm of Love
"Step Back in Time"	1990	5	—	11	23	36	4	21	29	4	—		ARIA: Gold	Rhythm of Love
"What Do I Have to Do"	1991	11	—	15	50	48	7	—	—	6	—			Rhythm of Love
"Shocked"	1991	7	—	18	—	—	2	—	—	6	—			Rhythm of Love
"Word Is Out"	1991	10	—	—	—	—	8	—	—	16	—			Let's Get to It
"If You Were with Me Now" (with Keith Washington)	1991	23	—	31	—	61	7	—	—	4	—			Let's Get to It
"Give Me Just a Little More Time"	1992	24	—	13	—	51	6	—	—	2	—	UK: 325,000		Let's Get to It
"Finer Feelings"	1992	60	—	—	—	—	16	—	—	11	—			Let's Get to It
"What Kind of Fool (Heard All That Before)"	1992	17	—	36	—	81	22	—	—	14	—			Greatest Hits
"Celebration"	1992	21	—	26	—	—	11	—	—	20	—			Greatest Hits
"Confide in Me"	1994	1	—	20	10	50	12	12	20	2	39	UK: 189,000	ARIA: Platinum; BPI: Silver	Kylie Minogue
"Put Yourself in My Place"	1994	11	—	—	—	87	—	—	—	11	—		ARIA: Gold	Kylie Minogue
"Where Is the Feeling?"	1995	31	—	—	—	—	—	—	—	16	—			Kylie Minogue
"Where the Wild Roses Grow" (with Nick Cave and the Bad Seeds)	1995	2	4	3	37	12	6	11	11	11	—		ARIA: Gold; BVMI: Gold	Murder Ballads
"Some Kind of Bliss"	1997	27	—	—	—	—	—	46	—	22	—			Impossible Princess
"Did It Again"	1997	15	—	—	—	—	—	—	—	14	—		ARIA: Gold	Impossible Princess
"Breathe"	1998	23	—	—	—	—	—	—	—	14	—			Impossible Princess
"Cowboy Style"	1998	39	—	—	—	—	—	—	—	—	—			Impossible Princess
"—" denotes a single that did not chart, or was not released in that territory.

=== 2000s ===
List of singles released in the 2000s decade as lead artist, with selected chart positions, sales and certifications, showing year released and originating album
Title	Year	Peak chart positions										Sales	Certifications	Album
Title	Year	AUS	AUT	BEL (FL)	FRA	GER	IRE	NZ	SWI	UK	US	Sales	Certifications	Album
"Spinning Around"	2000	1	—	35	28	62	4	2	34	1	—	UK: 314,000	ARIA: Platinum; BPI: Platinum; RMNZ: Gold	Light Years
"On a Night Like This"	2000	1	—	29	69	72	16	35	51	2	—	UK: 170,000	ARIA: Platinum; BPI: Silver	Light Years
"Kids" (with Robbie Williams)	2000	14	—	38	—	47	9	5	35	2	—	UK: 235,000	ARIA: Gold; BPI: Gold	Light Years
"Please Stay"	2000	15	—	— (Note: "Please Stay" did not enter the Flanders Ultratop 50; it peaked at number 10 on the Flanders Ultratip Bubbling Under chart.)	—	—	34	—	—	10	—		ARIA: Gold	Light Years
"Your Disco Needs You"	2001	20	70	—	—	31	—	—	27	152	—	UK: 20,000		Light Years
"Can't Get You Out of My Head"	2001	1	1	1	1	1	1	1	1	1	7	UK: 1,530,000; US: 531,000	ARIA: 3× Platinum; BPI: 3× Platinum; BVMI: Platinum; IFPI AUT: Platinum; IFPI SWI: Platinum; NVPI: Platinum; RIAA: Gold; RMNZ: 3× Platinum; SNEP: Platinum	Fever
"In Your Eyes"	2002	1	22	18	24	18	6	18	8	3	—		ARIA: Gold; BPI: Silver	Fever
"Love at First Sight"	2002	3	29	25	33	16	7	9	22	2	23	UK: 195,000; US: 134,000	ARIA: Gold; BPI: Platinum; RMNZ: Gold	Fever
"Come into My World"	2002	4	59	35	78	47	11	20	66	8	91	US: 56,000	ARIA: Gold	Fever
"Slow"	2003	1	20	9	45	8	5	9	18	1	91	UK: 169,000; US: 63,000	ARIA: Platinum; BPI: Silver	Body Language
"Red Blooded Woman"	2004	4	23	29	33	16	9	19	15	5	— (Note: "Red Blooded Woman" did not enter the Billboard Hot 100; it peaked at number 24 on the Dance Club Songs chart.)		RMNZ: Gold	Body Language
"Chocolate"	2004	14	58	— (Note: "Chocolate" did not enter the Flanders Ultratop 50; it peaked at number 2 on the Flanders Ultratip Bubbling Under chart.)	69	43	26	—	53	6	—			Body Language
"I Believe in You"	2004	6	4	13	35	12	9	29	6	2	— (Note: "I Believe in You" did not enter the Billboard Hot 100; it peaked at number 3 on the Dance Club Songs chart.)	UK: 150,000	ARIA: Gold; BPI: Silver	Ultimate Kylie
"Giving You Up"	2005	8	45	25	—	27	20	—	40	6	—			Ultimate Kylie
"2 Hearts"	2007	1	14	25	15	13	12	34	10	4	—		ARIA: Gold	X
"Wow"	2008	11	73	37	15	41	10	—	51	5	— (Note: "Wow" did not enter the Billboard Hot 100; it peaked at number 19 on the Dance/Mix Show Airplay chart.)	UK: 268,132	BPI: Silver	X
"In My Arms"	2008	35	16	10	10	8	15	—	10	10	—			X
"All I See"	2008	—	—	—	—	—	—	—	—	—	— (Note: "All I See" did not enter the Billboard Hot 100; it peaked at number 3 on the Dance Club Songs chart.)			X
"The One"	2008	—	—	— (Note: "The One" did not enter the Flanders Ultratop 50; it peaked at number 7 on the Flanders Ultratip Bubbling Under chart.)	—	—	—	— (Note: "The One" did not enter the NZ Top 40 Singles Chart; it peaked at number one on the NZ Airplay Chart.)	—	36	—			X
"—" denotes a single that did not chart, or was not released in that territory.

=== 2010s ===
List of singles released in the 2010s decade as lead artist, with selected chart positions, sales and certifications, showing year released and originating album
Title	Year	Peak chart positions										Sales	Certifications	Album
Title	Year	AUS	AUT	BEL (FL)	FRA	GER	IRE	NZ	SWI	UK	US Dance	Sales	Certifications	Album
"All the Lovers"	2010	13	5	10	3	10	6	—	6	3	1	UK: 383,000	ARIA: Gold; BPI: Platinum	Aphrodite
"Get Outta My Way"	2010	69	61	— (Note: "Get Outta My Way" did not enter the Flanders Ultratop 50, but peaked at number 5 on the Flanders Ultratip Bubbling Under chart.)	29	41	33	—	61	12	1	UK: 100,000; US: 66,000	BPI: Silver	Aphrodite
"Better than Today"	2010	55	—	—	—	—	—	—	—	32	1			Aphrodite
"Put Your Hands Up (If You Feel Love)"	2011	50	38	— (Note: "Put Your Hands Up (If You Feel Love)" did not enter the Flanders Ultratop 50; it peaked at number 36 on the Flanders Ultratip Bubbling Under chart.)	—	—	—	—	—	93	1			Aphrodite
"Timebomb"	2012	12	58	43	46	56	26	33	—	31	1			Non-album single
"Flower"	2012	—	—	— (Note: "Flower" did not enter the Flanders Ultratop 50; it peaked at number 21 on the Flanders Ultratip Bubbling Under chart.)	—	—	—	—	—	96	—			The Abbey Road Sessions
"Limpido" (with Laura Pausini)	2013	—	—	—	—	—	—	—	66	—	—			20 – The Greatest Hits
"Into the Blue"	2014	46	37	— (Note: "Into the Blue" did not enter the Flanders Ultratop 50; it peaked at number 6 on the Flanders Ultratip Bubbling Under chart.)	47	31	9	—	32	12	1	AUS: 3,832		Kiss Me Once
"I Was Gonna Cancel"	2014	—	—	—	—	—	—	—	—	59	5			Kiss Me Once
"Only You" (with James Corden)	2015	—	—	— (Note: "Only You" did not enter the Flanders Ultratop 50; it peaked at number 22 on the Flanders Ultratip Bubbling Under chart.)	—	—	—	—	—	155	—			Kylie Christmas
"100 Degrees" (with Dannii Minogue)	2015	—	—	—	—	—	—	—	—	— (Note: "100 Degrees" did not enter the UK Singles Chart; it peaked at number 2 on the UK Physical Singles Chart.)	—			Kylie Christmas
"Every Day's Like Christmas"	2015	—	—	—	—	—	—	—	—	—	—			Kylie Christmas
"At Christmas"	2016	—	—	—	—	—	—	—	—	—	—			Kylie Christmas: Snow Queen Edition
"Wonderful Christmastime" (with Mika)	2016	—	—	— (Note: "Wonderful Christmastime" did not enter the Flanders Ultratop 50; it peaked at number 23 on the Flanders Ultratip Bubbling Under chart.)	—	—	—	—	—	—	—			Kylie Christmas: Snow Queen Edition
"Dancing"	2018	46	—	— (Note: "Dancing" did not enter the Flanders Ultratop 50; it peaked at number 44 on the Flanders Ultratip Bubbling Under chart.)	—	71	—	— (Note: "Dancing" did not enter the NZ Top 40 Singles Chart; it peaked at number seven on the NZ Heatseeker Singles Chart.)	—	38	1	AUS: 35,000; UK: 200,000	ARIA: Gold; BPI: Silver	Golden
"Stop Me from Falling"	2018	— (Note: "Stop Me from Falling" peaked at number 32 on the ARIA Digital Tracks Chart.)	—	— (Note: "Stop Me from Falling" did not enter the Flanders Ultratop 50; it peaked at number 26 on the Flanders Ultratip Bubbling Under chart.)	—	—	—	—	—	52	—			Golden
"Golden"	2018	—	—	—	—	—	—	—	—	— (Note: "Golden" did not enter the UK Singles Chart; it peaked at number 22 on the UK Airplay Chart.)	—			Golden
"A Lifetime to Repair"	2018	—	—	—	—	—	—	—	—	— (Note: "A Lifetime to Repair" did not enter the UK Singles Chart; it peaked at number 21 on the UK Airplay Chart.)	—			Golden
"Music's Too Sad Without You" (with Jack Savoretti)	2018	—	—	—	—	—	—	—	—	— (Note: "Music's Too Sad Without You" did not enter the UK Singles Chart, but peaked at number 17 on the UK Singles Sales Chart.)	—	UK: 62,948		Golden
"Sincerely Yours"	2018	—	—	—	—	—	—	—	—	—	—			Golden
"New York City"	2019	— (Note: "New York City" did not enter the ARIA Singles Chart; it peaked at number 38 on the ARIA Digital Track Chart.)	—	— (Note: "New York City" did not enter the Flanders Ultratop 50; it peaked at number 16 on the Flanders Ultratip Bubbling Under chart.)	—	—	—	—	—	— (Note: "New York City" did not enter the UK Singles Chart; it peaked at number 26 on the UK Singles Sales Chart.)	—			Step Back in Time: The Definitive Collection
"—" denotes a single that did not chart, or was not released in that territory.

=== 2020s ===
List of singles released in the 2020s decade as lead artist, with selected chart positions and sales, showing year released and originating album
Title	Year	Peak chart positions										Sales	Certifications	Album
Title	Year	AUS	BEL (FL)	CAN	GER Down.	HUN	IRE	NZ Hot	UK	US Dance /Elec.	WW	Sales	Certifications	Album
"Say Something"	2020	— (Note: "Say Something" did not enter the ARIA Singles Chart; it peaked at number five on the Billboard Australian Digital Song Sales chart.)	— (Note: "Say Something" did not enter the Flanders Ultratop 50; it peaked at number 14 on the Flanders Ultratip Bubbling Under chart.)	—	—	14	—	40	56	18	—	UK: 75,555		Disco
"Magic"	2020	— (Note: "Magic" did not enter the ARIA Singles Chart; it peaked at number five on the Billboard Australian Digital Song Sales chart.)	— (Note: "Magic" did not enter the Flanders Ultratop 50; it peaked at number 17 on the Flanders Ultratip Bubbling Under chart.)	—	—	—	—	28	53	17	—	UK: 46,986		Disco
"Real Groove" (solo or Studio 2054 Remix with Dua Lipa)	2020	—	—	—	—	16	—	8	95	15	—	UK: 24,730		Disco
"A Second to Midnight" (with Years & Years)	2021	—	—	—	—	37	—	—	— (Note: "A Second to Midnight" did not enter the UK Singles Chart; it peaked at number 6 on the UK Singles Sales Chart.)	26	—			Disco: Guest List Edition
"Kiss of Life" (with Jessie Ware)	2021	—	—	—	—	—	—	—	— (Note: "Kiss of Life" did not enter the UK Singles Chart; it debuted and peaked at number 32 on the UK Singles Sales Chart.)	49	—			Disco: Guest List Edition
"Padam Padam"	2023	19	32	98	14	32	7	11	8	7	190	UK: 555,230	ARIA: Platinum; BPI: Platinum; RIAA: Gold; RMNZ: Gold	Tension
"Tension"	2023	46	—	— (Note: "Tension" did not enter the Canadian Hot 100 chart; it peaked at number 47 on the Canadian Digital Songs chart.)	30	—	34	10	19	18	—	UK: 30,085		Tension
"Hold on to Now"	2023	— (Note: "Hold on to Now" did not enter the ARIA Top 50 Singles chart; it peaked at number 24 on the ARIA Digital Track Chart.)	—	—	65	—	—	21	81	32	—			Tension
"Dance Alone" (with Sia)	2024	— (Note: "Dance Alone" did not enter the ARIA Top 50 Singles chart; it peaked at number 1 on the Australian Independent Singles Chart.)	—	—	—	—	—	19	60	8	—			Reasonable Woman
"Midnight Ride" (with Orville Peck and Diplo)	2024	—	—	—	—	—	—	34	— (Note: "Midnight Ride" did not enter the UK Singles Chart; it debuted and peaked at number 10 on the UK Singles Sales Chart.)	—	—			Stampede
"My Oh My" (with Bebe Rexha and Tove Lo)	2024	— (Note: "My Oh My" did not enter the ARIA Top 50 Singles chart; it peaked at number 1 on the Australian Independent Singles Chart.)	—	—	—	—	—	21	63	33	—			Tension II
"Edge of Saturday Night" (with the Blessed Madonna)	2024	—	—	—	69	—	—	35	— (Note: "Edge of Saturday Night" did not enter the UK Singles Chart; it peaked at number 17 on the UK Singles Sales Chart.)	—	—			Godspeed
"Lights Camera Action"	2024	— (Note: "Lights Camera Action" did not enter the ARIA Top 50 Singles Chart; it peaked at number 15 on the Australian Artists Singles Chart.)	—	—	17	—	—	16	59	43	—			Tension II
"Someone for Me" (Remix with YouNotUs)	2025	—	—	—	—	—	—	36	— (Note: "Someone for Me" did not enter the UK Singles Chart; it debuted and peaked at number 20 on the UK Singles Sales Chart.)	—	—			Tension II
"Last Night I Dreamt I Fell in Love" (with Alok)	2025	—	—	—	—	—	—	34	— (Note: "Last Night I Dreamt I Fell in Love" did not enter the UK Singles Chart; it peaked at number 1 on the UK Singles Sales Chart.)	— (Note: "Last Night I Dreamt I Fell in Love" did not enter the Billboard Hot Dance/Electronic Songs; it peaked at number 9 on the Billboard Dance Digital Song Sales.)	—			Non-album single
"XMAS"	2025	— (Note: "XMAS" did not enter the top 100 ARIA Singles Chart; it peaked at number 4 on Australian Artist Singles Chart.)	—	—	—	—	—	—	1	— (Note: "XMAS" did not enter the Billboard Hot Dance/Electronic Songs; it peaked at number 13 on the Billboard Bubbling Under Hot 100.)	155	UK: 110,685	BPI: Silver	Kylie Christmas (Fully Wrapped)
"These Alarms" (with Snow Patrol)	2026	—	—	—	—	—	—	—	— (Note: "These Alarms" did not enter the UK Singles Chart; it peaked at number 1 on the UK Singles Sales Chart.)	—	—			Non-album singles
"Love Sensation" (Afterhours Mix) (with Madonna)	2026	61	—	—	—	—	—	38	8	— (Note: "Love Sensation" did not enter the Billboard Hot Dance/Electronic Songs; it peaked at number 2 on the Billboard Digital Song Sales.)	—			Non-album singles
"—" denotes a single that did not chart or was not released in that territory.

== As a featured artist ==
List of singles as a featured artist, with selected chart positions, sales and certifications, showing year released and originating album
Title	Year	Peak chart positions										Sales	Certifications	Album
Title	Year	AUS	AUT	BEL (FL)	FRA	GER	IRE	NZ	SWI	UK	US Dance	Sales	Certifications	Album
"Keep on Pumpin' It" (Visionmasters and Tony King featuring Kylie Minogue)	1991	—	—	—	—	—	—	—	—	49	—			Non-album single
"GBI (German Bold Italic)" (Towa Tei featuring Kylie Minogue and Haruomi Hosono)	1997	50	—	—	—	—	—	—	—	63	—			Sound Museum
"Higher" (Taio Cruz featuring Kylie Minogue)	2010	25	3	12	7	3	7	5	4	8	1	UK: 338,000	ARIA: Gold; BPI: Gold; GLF: Gold; IFPI AUT: Platinum; IFPI SWI: Platinum; RMNZ: Gold	Rokstarr
"Right Here, Right Now" (Giorgio Moroder featuring Kylie Minogue)	2015	—	—	— (Note: "Right Here, Right Now" did not enter the Flanders Ultratop 50; it peaked at number 10 on the Flanders Ultratip Bubbling Under chart.)	147	—	—	—	—	— (Note: "Right Here, Right Now" did not enter the UK Singles Chart; it peaked at number 74 on the UK Singles Sales Chart.)	1			Déjà Vu
"The Other Boys" (Nervo featuring Kylie Minogue, Jake Shears and Nile Rodgers)	2015	—	—	—	—	—	—	—	—	— (Note: "The Other Boys" did not enter the UK Singles Chart; it peaked at number 3 on the UK Physical Singles Chart.)	1			Collateral
"Really Don't Like U" (Tove Lo featuring Kylie Minogue)	2019	—	—	—	—	—	—	— (Note: "Really Don't Like U" did not enter the NZ Top 40 Singles Chart; it peaked at number 37 on the NZ Hot Singles Chart.)	—	— (Note: "'Really Don't Like U" did not enter the UK Singles Chart; it peaked at number 74 on the UK Singles Sales Chart.)	—			Sunshine Kitty
"On oublie le reste" (Jenifer featuring Kylie Minogue)	2019	—	—	—	— (Note: "On oublie le reste" did not enter the French Top 150 Singles Chart; it peaked at number 9 on the French Digital Songs Sales Chart.)	—	—	—	—	—	—			Nouvelle page
"Starstruck (Kylie Minogue Remix)" (with Years & Years)	2021	—	—	—	—	—	—	—	—	—	—			Night Call
"—" denotes a single that did not chart, or was not released in that territory.

== Charity singles ==
List of charity singles, with selected chart positions and certifications, showing year released
Title	Year	Peak chart positions										Certifications
Title	Year	AUS	AUT	BEL (FL)	FRA	GER	IRE	NZ	SWE	SWI	UK	Certifications
"A World Without Music" (amongst Hearing Aid)	1985	—	—	—	—	—	—	—	—	—	—	
"Do They Know It's Christmas?" (amongst Band Aid II)	1989	30	—	17	—	74	1	8	15	—	1	BPI: Platinum
"Lhuna" (with Coldplay)	2008	—	—	—	—	—	—	—	—	—	—	
"Monkey Man" (with The Wiggles)	2009	—	—	—	—	—	—	—	—	—	—	
"Everybody Hurts" (amongst Helping Haiti)	2010	28	23	— (Note: "Everybody Hurts" did not enter the Flanders Ultratop 50; it peaked at number 1 on the Flanders Ultratip Bubbling Under chart.)	—	16	1	17	21	16	1	BPI: Platinum
"We Are One" (with Verbal)	2011	—	—	—	—	—	—	—	—	—	—	
"Crystallize"	2014	115	—	— (Note: "Crystallize" did not enter the Flanders Ultratop 50; it peaked at number 38 on the Flanders Ultratip Bubbling Under chart.)	139	—	88	—	—	—	60	
"God Only Knows" (amongst BBC Music and Friends)	2014	—	—	—	—	—	77	—	—	—	20	
"Stop Crying Your Heart Out" (amongst BBC Radio 2's Allstars)	2020	—	—	—	—	—	—	—	—	—	7	
"—" denotes a charity single that did not chart, or was not released in that territory.

== Promotional singles ==
List of promotional singles, with selected chart positions, showing year released and originating album
Title	Year	Peak chart positions					Album
Title	Year	AUS	JPN Over.	UK Sales	US Dance Club	US Dance/ Elec.	Album
"Do You Dare?" (Note: Released under the name Angel K.)	1991	—	—	—	—	—	Let's Get to It
"I Guess I Like It Like That"	1991	174	—	—	—	—	Let's Get to It
"Too Far"	1998	—	—	—	—	—	Impossible Princess
"Dancing Queen"	1999	—	—	—	—	—	Intimate and Live
"Butterfly"	2001	—	—	—	14	—	Light Years
"Fever"	2002	—	—	—	—	—	Fever
"Secret (Take You Home)" (Note: Released as a promotional single in Taiwan.)	2004	—	—	—	—	—	Body Language
"Promises" (Note: Released as a promotional single in Ireland.)	2004	—	—	—	—	—	Body Language
"Sometime Samurai" (Towa Tei featuring Kylie Minogue)	2005	—	—	—	—	—	Flash
"Sensitized" (Note: Released as a promotional single in Switzerland.) (with Christophe Willem)	2009	—	—	—	—	—	Caféine
"Whistle" (with múm)	2013	—	—	—	—	—	Jack & Diane
"Skirt"	2013	—	—	—	1	18	Non-album single
"Sexercize"	2014	—	—	—	—	30	Kiss Me Once
"Beautiful" (with Enrique Iglesias)	2014	47	—	—	—	—	Sex and Love
"Golden Boy"	2014	—	—	— (Note: "Golden Boy" did not enter the UK Singles Chart; it peaked at number 7 on the UK Physical Singles Chart.)	—	—	Kiss Me Once
"Million Miles" (Note: Released as a radio promotional single in Spain.)	2014	—	—	—	—	—	Kiss Me Once
"Sexy Love" (Note: Released as a radio promotional single in Australia.)	2014	—	—	—	—	—	Kiss Me Once
"Absolutely Anything and Anything at All"	2015	—	—	—	—	—	Absolutely Anything
"This Wheel's on Fire"	2016	—	—	88	—	—	Absolutely Fabulous: The Movie
"Raining Glitter"	2018	—	—	80	—	—	Golden
"I Love It"	2020	—	—	26	—	38	Disco
"Dance Floor Darling" (Note: Released as a radio promotional single in the United Kingdom.)	2021	—	—	—	—	—	Disco
"Marry the Night"	2021	—	—	15	—	24	Born This Way the Tenth Anniversary
"10 Out of 10" (with Oliver Heldens)	2023	—	—	19	—	—	Tension
"Tension – Live from the Tension Tour"	2025	—	—	—	—	—	Tension Tour//Live 2025
"Light Up"	2026	—	13	15	—	—	Non-album single
"—" denotes a promotional single that did not chart.

== Other charted songs ==
List of other charted songs, with selected chart positions and certifications, showing year released and originating album
Title	Year	Peak chart positions										Certifications	Album
Title	Year	AUS	AUT	CAN	FRA	GER	IRE	SWI	UK	US Dance/ Elec.	WW	Certifications	Album
"White Diamond"	2007	—	—	—	—	—	—	—	114	—	—		X
"Magnetic Electric"	2007	—	—	—	—	—	—	—	176	—	—		X
"Speakerphone"	2007	—	—	87	—	—	—	—	—	—	—		X
"Santa Baby"	2007	44	27	—	—	23	52	57	31	—	89	BPI: Platinum; BVMI: Gold	A Kylie Christmas
"Night Fever"	2016	—	—	—	159	—	—	—	—	—	—		Kylie Christmas: Snow Queen Edition
"What You Waiting For" (Sigala featuring Kylie Minogue)	2018	—	—	—	—	—	—	—	— (Note: "What You Waiting For" did not enter the UK Singles Chart; it peaked at number 33 on the UK Singles Sales Chart.)	—	—		Brighter Days
"Miss a Thing"	2020	—	—	—	—	—	—	—	—	30	—		Disco
"Supernova"	2020	—	—	—	—	—	—	—	—	48	—		Disco
"Can't Stop Writing Songs About You" (with Gloria Gaynor)	2021	—	—	—	—	—	—	—	— (Note: "Can't Stop Writing Songs About You" did not enter the UK Singles Chart; it peaked at number 79 on the UK Singles Sales Chart.)	—	—		Disco: Guest List Edition
"Voices" (Jake Shears featuring Kylie Minogue)	2023	—	—	—	—	—	—	—	— (Note: "Voices" did not enter the UK Singles Chart; it peaked at number 47 on the UK Singles Sales Chart.)	—	—		Last Man Dancing
"Things We Do for Love"	2023	—	—	—	—	—	—	—	— (Note: "Things We Do for Love" did not enter the UK Singles Chart; it peaked at number 69 on the UK Singles Sales Chart.)	—	—		Tension
"Hot in December"	2025	—	—	—	—	—	—	—	— (Note: "Hot in December" did not enter the UK Singles Chart; it peaked at number 32 on the UK Singles Sales Chart.)	—	—		Kylie Christmas (Fully Wrapped)
"Office Party"	2025	—	—	—	—	—	—	—	— (Note: "Office Party" did not enter the UK Singles Chart; it peaked at number 97 on the UK Singles Sales Chart.)	—	—		Kylie Christmas (Fully Wrapped)
"Story"	2026	—	—	—	—	—	—	—	— (Note: "Story" did not enter the UK Singles Chart; it peaked at number 70 on the UK Singles Sales Chart.)	—	—		Tension
"—" denotes a song that did not chart.

== See also ==
- Artists with the most number-ones on the U.S. Dance Club Songs chart
- List of artists who have achieved simultaneous number-one UK single and album
- List of artists who reached number one on the Australian singles chart
- List of artists who reached number one in Ireland
- List of artists who reached number one on the Italian Singles Chart
- List of artists who reached number one on the Spanish Singles Chart
- List of artists who reached number one on the U.S. Dance Club Songs chart
- List of artists with the most UK singles chart number ones
- List of artists with the most UK singles chart top tens
- List of best-selling music artists in the United Kingdom in singles sales

== Notes ==
Peak component chart positions

Release information for singles

Release information for promotional singles
