= 10 Out of 10 (Oliver Heldens song) =

2023 promotional single by Oliver Heldens featuring Kylie Minogue

Promotional single by Oliver Heldens featuring Kylie Minogue

from the album Tension
- Released: 5 April 2023
- Genre: Dance; disco; house; eurodance; synth-pop
- Length: 3:01
- Label: Kangarooli Tracks; RCA
- Songwriters: Oliver Heldens; James Abrahart; Liana Banks; Jackson Foote; Sarah Hudson; Kylie Minogue
- Producers: Heldens; Foote; Duck Blackwell

"10 Out of 10" is a song by Dutch DJ and producer Oliver Heldens featuring Australian singer Kylie Minogue. (Note: Varied references throughout the article have identified Oliver Heldens and Kylie Minogue as either the lead artist or featuring artist. However, both Apple Music and Spotify have specified Heldens as the main artist, and Minogue as the featuring artist.) It was initially released as a promotional single by Kangarooli Tracks and RCA on 5 April 2023, and later included as a stand-alone track on Minogue's sixteenth studio album Tension (2023) by BMG and Darenote. Heldens and Minogue wrote the song with James Abrahart, Liana Banks, Jackson Foote, and Sarah Hudson, and it was produced by Heldens, Foote, and Duck Blackwell.

Originally a solo track by Heldens, his team contacted Minogue and sent her a demo version of the song, asking her to provide vocals and additional lyrics. Her changes to the original demo, as well as recording the track in remote locations without ever working with Heldens, posed additional challenges during the production process. Musically, it is an uptempo track with influences from synth-pop, house, disco, eurodance, and dance music from the 1980s to the 2020s. (Note: All genres listed throughout the article are provided by Oliver Heldens, according to a press release by Sony Music.) Critics noted the chorus and lyrics as an homage to LGBT culture, particularly ballroom and drag.

Music critics gave "10 out of 10" positive reviews, with many praising the blend of Heldens and Minogue's sounds, as well as the chorus and overall sound. Following its appearance on Tension, further critical analysis ranged from mixed to positive. In the United Kingdom, the song reached number 19 on the Single Sales and Download Chart, and also charted in several other European territories. Heldens had performed the song on several live shows and Minogue has sung the song a capella on certain dates for her More Than Just a Residency at The Venetian Las Vegas.

== Background ==
In June 2022, Minogue told Vogue Australia that she was working on new music, citing her 2003 single "Slow" as inspiration for the album's sound. She began recording the following month, in July, and finished in 2023. On 27 March, Oliver Heldens had posted on Instagram a picture of his Notes app, alluding it a collaboration between five female artists, including Minogue's name. Four days later, The Music reported on Minogue's new music after she posted a video and snippet of the song "10 Out of 10", which featured Heldens as the lead artist. In the post, she confirmed the release date of the song for 5 April 2023.

== Development and composition ==
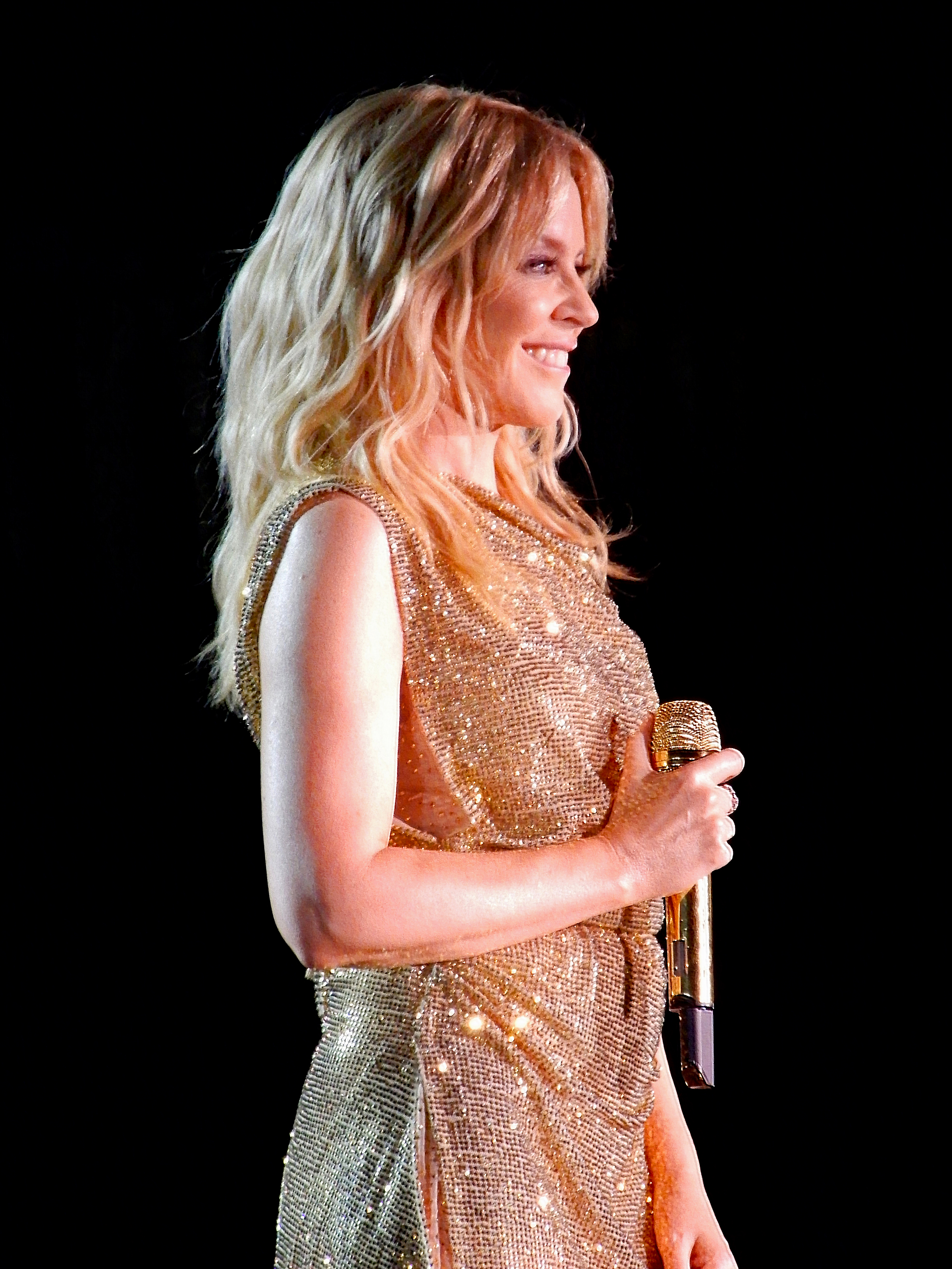
"10 Out of 10" features guest vocals and additional writing credits by Australian singer Kylie Minogue (pictured).

"10 Out of 10" was originally recorded as a demo for Heldens and featured an unknown female vocalist. His team approached Minogue and her team about working together on the track, which she accepted and thought, "This is fun; I can see people strutting along to this track". Minogue admitted that she struggled with the track's development for a variety of reasons. The first was to record her vocals without sounding like a "bad carbon copy" of the original demo, and "then wean [myself] off and find out where I fit".

Another challenge was recording in remote locations, as she had never worked with Heldens on music before. To accomplish this, Heldens and Minogue would exchange emails containing stems to complete the song. Minogue described Heldens as a "sweet person" throughout the process, but it took her a "long time to get that one down with the syncopation of it". She later admitted that this, like the other songs on her album Tension (2023), took a long time to complete. After finishing and releasing the song, Heldens described it as his "biggest collaboration to date" and a "pleasure and privilege to work with them".

Musically, "10 Out of 10" was "inspired by 80s synth-pop and disco, 90s house, and 00s Eurodance, with a modern dance music twist, and of course with a big juicy bassline", as quoted by Heldens. The song was co-written by himself, Minogue, James Abrahart, Liana Banks, Jackson Foote, and Sarah Hudson, and produced by Heldens, Foote, and Duck Blackwell. Several music critics compared the song's subject matter to LGBT culture, specifically ballroom and drag; Peter Piatkowski of PopMatters elaborated on this point, writing: "The song's title cleverly alludes to the drag balls when a competitor scores ‘tens across the board’ for her looks and performance".

== Release and reception ==
Heldens first teased the song in full on 2 April 2023, when he uploaded episode 457 of his Heldeep Radio via YouTube. Three days later, Kangarooli Tracks and RCA released the song as a promotional single, which was distributed on digital and streaming platforms. "10 Out of 10" was not originally planned for Minogue's album Tension, but she "embraced it" and thought it was a "nice addition". In the United Kingdom, the song peaked at number 19 on the Single Sales and Download Chart. The song reached number 132 in Belarus, 138 in Estonia, 116 in Latvia, and 56 in Russia (provided by TopHit Radio).

Music critics praised "10 Out of 10" when it was first released. Lennon Cihak of EDM.com praised the song and the collaboration between the artists, writing that it "takes both powerhouse artists' styles and blends them better than a Vincent van Gogh painting". He praised the song's overall sound, writing, "The former beautifully layers in disco-inspired sound design to highlight the latter's distinctive vocal flair". Mandy Rogers of EQ Music called it a "massive crossover appealing banger", while EDMTunes editor Jaesyun compared it favourably to Minogue's work on her album Disco (2020) and Helen's "summertime house" sound.

Following its release on Tension, the song received mixed to positive reviews. Neil Z. Yeung of AllMusic praised the track as an album highlight, while Sam Franzini of The Line of Best Fit called it one of the album's "joyous moments". Clash writer Lucy Harbon compared the track to Beyoncé's work on Renaissance (2022), noting that both were influenced by ballroom and drag culture. Michael Cragg of Crack thought it "fits nicely in context" with the record, whereas Jeremy Allen of The Quietus thought the album's uneven sound, despite its target audience, aided the song and album track "Vegas High", writing that it "provide rushes that may end in sugary comas inside thirty seconds".

Other reviews were less positive. Devon Chodzin of Paste had a mixed reaction; Chodzin liked the track's overall sound and nod to the LGBTQ+ community, but thought it wasn't her best offering to that audience. They had written: "As a pop album track praising a sexy counterpart, it’s delightful; as an artifact interpellating ballroom, it feels chintzy". Pitchfork contributor Harry Tafoya described it as a "flop" for the album, saying it was "far too bloodless and vanilla to remotely merit its watered-down ballroom chorus". Guy Oddy of The Arts Desk described the track as "fluffy" and "chees[y]".

== Promotion ==
Following its release, "10 Out of 10" was uploaded to Helden's YouTube. When it was included on Tension, Minogue re-released the track with an additional Music visualisation on her own YouTube channel. On 8 December, an extended version was included in Extension: The Extended Mixes, a remix album to Tension. She also added the track to the setlist of her More Than Just a Residency concert residency, which took place at the Voltaire in The Venetian Las Vegas.

== Formats and track listing ==
Digital download / streaming

1. "10 Out of 10" (featuring Kylie Minogue) – 2:50

Digital single – extended mix

1. "10 Out of 10" (featuring Kylie Minogue) [Extended Mix] – 4:00

Digital single – Marlon Hoffstadt aka DJ Daddy Trance remix

1. "10 Out of 10" (featuring Kylie Minogue) [Marlon Hoffstadt aka DJ Daddy Trance remix] – 3:22

== Credits and personnel ==
Credits adapted from the liner notes of Tension.

Locations

- Recorded in Australia, Germany, the Netherlands, Slovenia, the United Kingdom and the United States.

Personnel

- Oliver Heldens - lead artist, writing, producing, mixing, bells, brass, handclaps, drums, effects, percussion, keyboards, percussion, programming, synths, effects, vocoder
- Kylie Minogue – featuring artist, vocals, writing, engineering
- James Abrahart - backing vocals, writing
- Dick Beetham - mastering
- Serge Courtois - mixing
- Jackson Foote - producing, writing
- Martin Bijelic - producing, mixing, bells, brass, handclaps, drums, effects, percussion, keyboards, percussion, programming, synths, effects, vocoder
- Duck Blackwell - vocal producer
- Lianna Banks - writing
- Sarah Hudson - writing

== Charts ==
Chart performance for "10 Out of 10"
Chart (2023)	Peak position
Belarus Airplay (TopHit)	132
Estonia Airplay (TopHit)	138
Latvia Airplay (TopHit)	116
Lithuania Airplay (TopHit)	62
Russia Airplay (TopHit)	56
Spain Airplay (TopHit)	49
UK Singles Downloads (Official Charts)	19
UK Single Sales (OCC)	19

== Release history ==
"10 Out of 10" release history
Region	Date	Format	Label	Note(s)	Ref(s).
Various	2 April 2023	Streaming	Kangarooli; RCA	Original ver.	
Various	5 April 2023	Digital download; streaming	Kangarooli; RCA	Original ver.	
Various	8 December 2023	Digital download; streaming	BMG; Darenote	Extended mix	
Various	5 January 2024	Digital download; streaming	Kangarooli; RCA	Marlon Hoffstadt aka DJ Daddy Trance remix	
