= Things We Do for Love (song) =

2023 song by Kylie Minogue

Song by Kylie Minogue

from the album Tension
- Released: 22 September 2023
- Recorded: 2022
- Studio: Surrey Pool House (Surrey); Infinite Disco (Paris)
- Genre: Synth-pop
- Length: 3:10
- Label: BMG; Darenote
- Songwriters: Kylie Minogue; Kamille; Biff Stannard; Duck Blackwell; Jon Green; Anya Jones
- Producers: Biff Stannard; Duck Blackwell; Jon Green

Visualiser
- "Things We Do for Love" on YouTube

"Things We Do for Love" is a song by Australian singer Kylie Minogue. It appears as the third track on Minogue's sixteenth studio album, Tension (2023). Minogue wrote the song with Anya Jones, Camille "Kamille" Purcell, Jon Green, and producers Duck Blackwell and Richard "Biff" Stannard. "Things We Do for Love" was regarded by music critics as a tribute to 1980s culture and music, alongside Minogue's work from that era. Musically, it is an upbeat ballad-inspired synth-pop track with elements of dance-pop, rock, new wave and power-pop. The song's lyrics focus on the joy of being in love and Minogue's reasons for being in a relationship regardless of the outcomes.

"Things We Do for Love" was enthusiastically received by critics for its production quality and overall throwback to the 1980s; it was noted as a highlight of the album by some due to its upbeat nature and chorus. Despite not being released as a single, it appeared on the Hot Trending Songs chart powered by X (formerly Twitter) and component charts provided by the Official Charts Company in the United Kingdom during the release week of Tension. Minogue promoted the song with a visualiser that premiered on her YouTube channel, followed by an extended mix that appeared on her remix album Extension (The Extended Mixes) (2023).

== Writing and development ==
Near the end of her campaign for her studio album Disco (2020), Minogue appeared on BBC Radio 2 to discuss new music, saying, "Perhaps it's going a bit more electropop. Don't quote me that [...] but that's what's on the boil at the minute." Minogue confirmed this in a June 2022 interview with Vogue, citing her 2003 single "Slow" as inspiration for the album's sound. The first sessions began with longtime collaborators Richard "Biff" Stannard, Duck Blackwell, and Jon Green, as well as Minogue's A&R Jamie Nelson, and they completed several songs while in Surrey.

After working in Surrey, Nelson suggested to Minogue that she collaborate with Anya Jones and Camille Purcell (known as Kamille) on new music. Purcell was thrilled with the opportunity and said of her collaboration with Minogue, "She was a household name for me and my family, I think it was just part of my DNA, knowing her name and her music." Although initially intimidated, Purcell began to relax around Minogue, and by the end of the day, the five collaborators had completed two written songs: "Things We Do for Love" and "Tension". According to Minogue, working with the two gave her the "female energy" she needed for the parent album. The song was recorded between Surrey Pool House (Surrey) and Infinite Disco Studios (Paris); Minogue was the vocal engineer, Guy Massey mixed the track, and Dick Beetham mastered the final recording.

== Composition ==
"'Things We Do for Love' was written on the same day as 'Tension,' when [UK songwriters and producers] Kamille and Anya [Jones] came in. It took quite a bit of time at the back end in finishing the song, working out how to shape it so that the drive keeps going. It's a weird structure, but I think it worked out really well."

— Minogue talking about the development of "Things We Do for Love".

"Things We Do for Love" lasts three minutes and ten seconds. According to an Apple Music review, Minogue compared the song's overall sound and vibe to the 1984 musical drama film Footloose, saying, "It's got a bit of a Footloose feel. There's no respite, it just keeps going and going, and the energy build." Several music critics have also commented on the track's 1980s-inspired sound. Minogue, Blackwell, Green, Stannard, and Nelson planned embrace 1980s music and culture on Tension, but they later abandoned the idea and decided not to focus on a specific theme. The song's lyrics focus on the joy of being in love and Minogue's reasons for being in a relationship regardless of the outcomes

"Things We Do for Love" is a synth-pop-driven track with elements of dance-pop, rock, new wave and power-pop. Albumism writer Quentin Harrison describes it and album track "Story" as "uptempo ballads" with Minogue "putting forward lush, adult pop where she modernizes mid-1980s electronic and drivetime rock textures." Peter Piatkowski of PopMatters compared the song's 1980s inspiration to Minogue's 1980 music catalogue, specifically her single "Je Ne Sais Pas Pourquoi," and discovered a difference "in both Minogue's performances and the quality of the music." Guy Oddy of The Arts Desk, on the other hand, identified "house-pop" elements in the song and album track "Vegas High".

According to Paste editor Devon Codizin, the song and album track "You Still Get Me High" "start slow and minimal, building a healthy tension before Kylie launches into a euphoric chorus." Crack editor Michael Cragg likened it to Xenomania's "featherlight electronics on the verses, hints of guitar throughout, and then a sudden sonic whoosh that rockets the chorus skywards." Nick Levine of NME compared the track to the work of American singer Belinda Carlisle, while Aaliyah C Humphrey of Medium said the track and "You Still Get My High" "feels as if Tiffany worked with A-Ha."

== Critical response ==
Music critics gave "Things We Do for Love" positive reviews. In comparison to the rest of the album, Neil Z. Yeung of AllMusic felt the track and "You Still Get Me High" "gears to hyperspeed with urgent singalong choruses, decade-appropriate synths, and dramatic sax breaks." The Line of Best Fit editor Sam Franzini praised the song's "joyous" vibe, citing its "blissful galactic post-chorus," while MusicOMH editor Ben Devlin called it "pure pop gold." Albumism writer Quentin Harrison praised the song's "adult-pop" sound, stating that it emphasises the expressive qualities of her voice. Retropop editor Connor Groto described the 80s influence as "unquestionably fresh, with a knowing wink towards the era that launched her."

PopMatters editor Peter Piatkowski praised Minogue's "big-hearted joy and life" on the track, saying it demonstrated how she is "one of the most humane pop singers captured on vinyl." PinkNews editor Marcus Wratten rated it as the fifth best track on Tension, calling it an "instant classic" and "a potential hit for Kylie when the days get warmer again next spring." While discussing influences from 1980s music, Medium's Aaliyah C Humphrey stated, "Despite the retro sound, Kylie never sounds out of place. Her youthful spirit shines bright in her glitter jumpsuit." Variety editor Todd Gilchrist described the track as "a more stripped-down version of which you could easily imagine Kevin Bacon dancing to back in 1984."

According to Oral Foster of Loud and Quiet, the song and "You Still Get My High" are "blissfully anachronistic '80s synths that seem to nod to her old dungaree-and-perm days," while Alexa Camp of Slant Magazine describes it as "perfect fodder for a top-down cruise along the PCH." Rolling Stone contributor Hannah Mylrea described it as "perfectly nice," but thought it fell short of the album's follow-up track "Tension." According to Annabel Ross of The Sydney Morning Herald, the song, like "You Still Get My High," lacks originality in its sound and chorus delivery, but "it's fun to hear Minogue in punch-drunk Carly Rae Jepsen mode." Guy Oddy of The Arts Desk was slightly critical, describing the song and "Vegas High" as one of the album's weaker tracks and calling the songwriting "trite."

== Commercial performance ==
"Things We Do for Love" was not released as a single from Tension, but rather with the album's release on 22 September 2023 in digital and physical formats. Nonetheless, it enjoyed some chart success during the album's release week. Billboard recognised the track on their now-defunct Hot Trending Songs chart, which was powdered by X (formerly Twitter), peaking at number nine. In the United Kingdom, the song spent one week at number 69 on the Singles Sales chart and number 67 on the Singles Download chart.

== Promotion ==
A visualiser for the song premiered on Minogue's YouTube channel, coinciding with the release of Tension, and included various other visualisers and lyric videos from the album. (Note: Other visualisers:) Minogue is seen singing and dancing to the song in front of various lights while dressed in a rhinestone catsuit. An extended version was included on the remix album Extension (The Extended Mixes) (2023), which was first released on vinyl and later on digital and streaming services. Minogue performed "Things We Do for Love" at the 2025 Tension Tour.

== Track listing ==
Album version

1. "Things We Do for Love" – 3:10

Extended version

1. "Things We Do for Love" – 5:20

== Credits and personnel ==
Credits adapted from the liner notes of Tension.

- Kylie Minogue – songwriter, lead vocals, background vocals, vocal engineer
- Anya Jones – songwriter
- Jon Green – songwriter, producer
- Camille "Kamille" Purcell – songwriter
- Duck Blackwell – songwriter, producer
- Richard "Biff" Stannard – songwriter, producer
- Guy Massey – audio mixer
- Dick Beetham – audio master

== Charts ==
Chart performance for "Things We Do for Love"
Chart (2023)	Peak position
UK Single Downloads (Official Charts Company)	67
UK Single Sales (Official Charts Company)	69

== Release history ==
Release dates and formats for "Things We Do for Love"
Region	Date	Version	Format	Label	Ref.
Various	22 September 2023	Album version	Digital download; streaming	BMG; Darenote	
Various	8 December 2023	Extended mix	Digital download; streaming	BMG; Darenote	
