= Vegas High =

2023 song by Kylie Minogue

Song by Kylie Minogue

from the album Tension
- Released: 22 September 2023
- Recorded: 2023
- Genre: Synth-pop
- Length: 3:33
- Label: BMG
- Songwriters: Kylie Minogue; Gerard O'Connell; Richard Boardman; Duck Blackwell
- Producers: Biff Stannard; Duck Blackwell

Official Lyric Video
- "Vegas High" on YouTube

"Vegas High" is a song by Australian singer Kylie Minogue from her sixteenth studio album, Tension (2023). While not released as an official single, the song served as a promotional anthem for her first concert residency, More Than Just a Residency, at the Venetian Resort in Las Vegas.

== Background and promotion ==
Minogue teased the song months before the album's release, often using the phrase "Vegas High" in interviews regarding her future live plans. The track was used as the official soundtrack for the trailer announcing More Than Just a Residency on 28 July 2023.

"Vegas High" was inspired by Minogue's anticipation for her More Than Just a Residency show in Las Vegas, where she, Stannard, Blackwell, and artist Gerald O'Connell hoped to create a "romanticised, cinematic" version of the city. It is a high-energy club track that sounds like 1990s techno music. Minogue described the song as capturing the "anticipation and adrenaline" of performing in the city. During the residency, "Vegas High" was performed as a centerpiece of the show and was also used as the final reprise during the closing night on 4 May 2024.

== Composition ==
"Vegas High" is a synth-pop and electronic track with elements of 90s dance music. Critics noted its "shimmering" production and its lyrical focus on escapism and the nightlife of Las Vegas.

== Album name ==
Primitively, Minogue considered naming the album Vegas High, but changed her mind, saying "I hope this doesn't sound depressing - when you watch the news, the word is used negatively - but actually, once we decided that, I was pleasantly surprised that this title was well received. People were excited to listen to the album Tension". She went on to explain that the diamond represented the title Tension, saying, "The diamond is a subliminal image: that of the creation of beautiful things under pressure. I believe people can feel it through the cover, especially if they understand how diamonds are formed, i.e. under constraint."

== Charts ==
Following the release of Tension, "Vegas High" appeared on several component charts due to strong digital sales and streaming.

Chart performance for "Vegas High"
Chart (2023)	Peak position
Australia Digital Tracks (ARIA)	26
New Zealand Hot Singles (RMNZ)	15
UK Singles Downloads (OCC)	7
UK Singles Sales (OCC)	28
