= Tension (Kylie Minogue album) =

2023 studio album by Kylie Minogue

- Standard cover artwork

Studio album by Kylie Minogue
- Released: 22 September 2023
- Recorded: 2021–2023
- Studios: Neverland (London); Infinite Disco Studio (London, Paris, Melbourne); Biffco Studios (Brighton); The Pool Studio (Bermondsey); Surrey Pool House (Surrey); Cutfather Studios (Copenhagen); PhD Studios (Copenhagen); Three Six Zero Studios (London)
- Genres: Pop; dance-pop; disco; electronic; EDM; synth-pop
- Length: 35:51
- Labels: BMG; Darenote; Liberator Music
- Producers: Duck Blackwell; Cutfather; Jackson Foote; Jon Green; Oliver Heldens; KayAndMusic; Lostboy; PhD; Biff Stannard

Kylie Minogue chronology
Infinite Disco (2022)	Tension (2023)	Tension II (2024)

Singles from Tension
- 1. "Padam Padam" Released: 18 May 2023; 2. "Tension" Released: 31 August 2023; 3. "Hold on to Now" Released: 30 October 2023

Tension is the sixteenth studio album by Australian singer Kylie Minogue. It was released on 22 September 2023 by BMG and Minogue's company, Darenote. Minogue enlisted several collaborators and producers for the album, including Richard "Biff" Stannard, Duck Blackwell, Jackson Foote, Lostboy, PhD, Cutfather, and Oliver Heldens. Originally inspired by the 1980s music and culture, she abandoned the idea and decided to make a record that emphasised each song's individuality rather than a central theme. Tension features various electronic dance genres and sounds such as pop, dance-pop, disco, electronic, and synth-pop. The lyrics to the album address themes such as love, lust, fun, and empowerment.

Tension was praised by music critics for its production quality, fun nature, Minogue's input, and overall sound. Many critics regarded it as one of Minogue's best releases, with publications naming it one of their top picks of 2023. Commercially, it reached number one in Australia, Belgium, Scotland and the United Kingdom. It was certified gold by the British Phonographic Industry (BPI) in the United Kingdom and has sold over half a million units worldwide, generating half a billion streams.

"Padam Padam", "Tension" and "Hold on to Now" were released as singles, while "10 Out of 10" by Heldens served as a promotional recording. "Padam Padam" became a commercial success for Minogue, gaining viral traction and cultural significance since its release. In addition, Minogue and Tension have received nominations and awards at various ceremonies. Minogue promoted the album by releasing a remix album called Extension: The Extended Mixes, performing on several occasions, and holding her More Than Just a Residency concert residency in Las Vegas. Tension II, a sequel album, was released on 18 October 2024, alongside a Tension Tour to support both releases beginning in February 2025.

== Background ==
Minogue released Disco on 6 November 2020. The album marked a musical departure from her country-pop-infused album Golden (2018), as she returned to her signature disco-influenced sound, incorporating pop and dance elements. It received positive reviews from music critics, many of whom praised Minogue's interpretation of various aspects of disco music and culture, as well as her musical return to the dance-disco genre. The album was commercially successful, reaching number one in Australia, Scotland and the United Kingdom, as well as component charts in Ireland and the United States. Due to the COVID-19 pandemic, the album received limited promotion, including single releases and promotional recordings, a one-time special live show called Infinite Disco, and a repackaged version titled Disco: Guest List Edition (2021). After promotion wrapped, Minogue returned to her hometown of Melbourne in February 2022, after living in London since the 1990s. Minogue told BBC Radio 2 in May about her plans for new music, saying, "Perhaps it's going a bit more electropop. Don't quote me that [...] but that's what's on the boil at the minute." She told Vogue in June that her 2003 single "Slow" would serve as a template for the album's sound.

== Concept and development ==
"I started this album with an open mind and a blank page. Unlike my last two albums, there wasn't a 'theme', it was about finding the heart or the fun or the fantasy of that moment and always trying to service the song. I wanted to celebrate each song’s individuality and dive into that freedom. I would say it's a blend of personal reflection, club abandon, and melancholic high."

— Minogue commenting on Tension.

Production on the album began in 2021, with early sessions involving longtime collaborators Richard "Biff" Stannard, Duck Blackwell, and Jon Green, as well as Minogue's A&R Jamie Nelson. They intended to use 1980s music and culture as a major component of the album's sound and vision. They eventually abandoned the idea and decided not to concentrate on a single theme. Minogue opened up about this choice: "Initially we were thinking 80s, but it didn't pan out that way [...] we agreed there's no theme [and that] it'd be refreshing not to have a theme after having done Golden and Disco." Minogue later intended to release an electro-pop-influenced album, with her single "Slow" serving as a blueprint for the album's evolving sound. "Hold On to Now" was one of the first tracks written for Tension, with Minogue sending Stannard a "Na-na-na" melody as a voice note and developing it.

Stannard does not fly, so the five of them went to Surrey in August and rented an Airbnb to work on the album. After a week, they had completed ten songs. They then worked with Anya Jones and Camille "Kamille" Purcell to complete two songs in one day, "Things We Do for Love" and "Tension". According to Minogue, working with Jones and Purcell provided her with the "female energy" she required for the parent album. While in Miami, Nelsen sent Minogue a demo recording of the song "Padam Padam", written by Ina Wroldsen and Peter "Lostboy" Rycroft. Minogue loved the demo and recorded it in a London hotel. Despite being one of the easiest songs to record, it was one of the album's final additions. Nelson then sent a demo of "Hands" with rap segments throughout. Nelson encouraged Minogue to contribute vocals and rap, which she later described as "refreshing". Minogue eventually went to Copenhagen, Brighton, Croatia, and Paris to continue recording the album.

Some tracks on the album, such as "10 Out of 10" and "Story," took longer to complete. "10 Out of 10" began as a demo by Dutch DJ Oliver Heldens, who collaborated with Minogue on vocals. Despite accepting the offer, she found the production process difficult because it required recording in remote locations, working without Heldens in person, and exchanging song stems via email. After finishing and releasing the song, Heldens called it his "biggest collaboration to date" and a "pleasure and privilege to work with them." Minogue also admitted that songs like "Tension" were "really out of place" and "wasn't sure it would make the album." However, "it was softened and finessed" as the song progressed. Other songs, such as "One More Time". underwent significant changes before being included in the album. Production was completed in 2023, and Minogue finished the record. When deciding on the album's final tracks, Minogue said, "If the song could stand on its own and fit in nicely with the other songs, that's the album." When asked about the album's subject matter, she said: "There are songs [on Tension] that may appear more superficial, but I feel like I can sing them with more certainty than I may have in the early days, when I was 19, 20, 21, 25." Minogue co-wrote twelve of the album's sixteen tracks and worked as an additional vocal engineer on nine of them.

== Music and songs ==
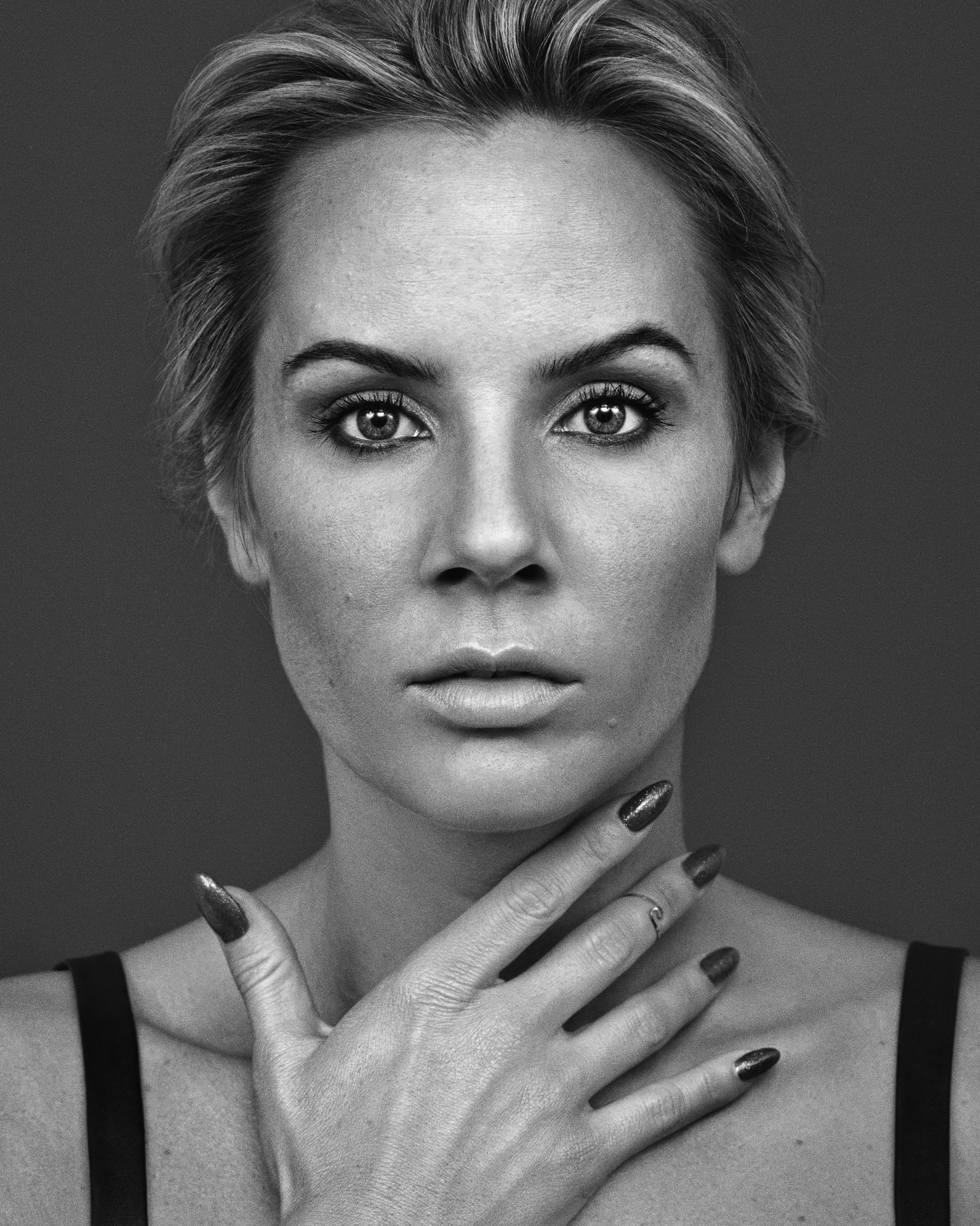
Ina Wroldsen (pictured) co-wrote the lead single from the album, "Padam Padam".

According to a Shore Fire Media press release, Tension is a record "full of euphoric, empowered dance floor bangers and sultry pop cuts" with "eleven tracks of unabashed pleasure-seeking, seize-the-moment, joyful pop tunes." It features a diverse range of electronic dance sounds and influences, such as pop, dance-pop, disco, electronic, and synthpop and additional notes of Eurodance, funk, R&B and Scandipop. She described it as a "blend of personal reflection, club abandon, and melancholic highs", saying she wanted to "celebrate each song's individuality and dive into that freedom." The album's lyrics centre on themes of love, lust, and empowerment, all of which have appeared in Minogue's previous work, according to Jonah Waterhouse of Vogue Australia. AllMusic and Riff compared the album's sound to Minogue's previous albums Fever (2001) and Aphrodite (2010), while Pitchfork editor Harry Tafoya described the record as a "compendium of all the sounds she's best known for: confectionary synth-pop, breezy Euro house, and propulsive EDM." Slant Magazine's Alexa Camp, on the other hand, saw an "unambiguous sonic thread [that] link[ed] all 14 of its songs".

Tension starts with "Padam Padam", a "hypnotic" electronic track that incorporates synth and dance-pop elements. The song's title and lyrics reference the heartbeat, and critics regard it as the album's sonic centrepiece. "Hold On to Now" has a synth-driven sound and "earnest" songwriting that recalls Swedish singer Robyn, as well as gospel choir sections performed by the House Gospel Choir. Minogue described the song as one of her personal favourites from the album. "Thing We Do for Love" features a "weird structure" of synths, guitar, and drum riffs reminiscent of 1980s synth-pop and power pop, as well as a subtle nod to the 1984 musical drama film Footloose. Critics cited "Tension" as one of the album's only experimental tracks, featuring vocoder on Minogue's vocal deliveries as well as jangly piano riffs influenced by 1990s house music with dance and electronic music elements. She described the song's creation as a "roller coaster ride, there are little diffusers that balance."

"One More Time" is an uptempo hybrid of pop, funk, and disco elements that were reminiscent of Disco, though she described the song's narrative as "nothing deep", stating that it has "a freedom to it" and "may or may not be romantic." "You Still Get Me High" builds on Minogue's exploration of the 1980s pop-dance sound from "Things We Do for Love" and delves into love. The original version was much "slower, more indulgent," but she wanted to improve the track even more, so she asked Blackwell to contribute to the final version. "Hands" features a "nostalgic" disco-inspired funky bass line and Ms Marinade's vocals during the verses, which were taken from the original demo. Minogue found it "easy" to record her vocals because Ms Marinade's male vocal deliveries were pitched to sound like female vocal registers. She also described the song as "kind of fun" and a "sunny-day song". "Green Light" has been compared to the work of British singer Dua Lipa, and it features early-1980s pop elements and a saxophone solo. Minogue referred to it as a "cousin" of her single "Spinning Around" (2000), calling it "breezy and chill."

"Vegas High" was inspired by Minogue's anticipation for her More Than Just a Residency show in Las Vegas, where she, Stannard, Blackwell, and artist Gerald O'Connell hoped to create a "romanticised, cinematic" version of the city. It is a high-energy club track that sounds like 1990s techno music. "10 Out of 10" was not intended to be included on Tension. However, she embraced the song and ultimately thought it was a "nice addition". According to Heldens, the song was "inspired by 80s synth-pop and disco, 90s house, and 00s Eurodance, with a modern dance music twist, and of course with a big juicy bassline" and incorporates LGBT culture references, namely ball and drag culture. Minogue also co-wrote the album's standard closer, "Story," which addresses personal issues she was dealing with at the time. Musically, it returns to 1980s-inspired music and has been described as a fast-paced bubblegum pop-dance track that critics found "athematic". The deluxe version's opening track "Love Train" references Super Mario, while "Just Imagine" is noted as one of the album's more mid-tempo tracks, and "Somebody to Love" is described as "classic Kylie".

== Release and artwork ==
"I will be like, 'Kylie, what color is this song?'... This is something we do a lot in the live world when we design lighting and visuals for songs. We’ll be like this is the blue song, this is an orange song. So we kind of do the same thing but in an art direction world so we can kind of extract that and make sure that thread runs throughout the campaign."

— Aries Moross discussing about the album's design process.

Minogue's team revealed the album's release date and formats shortly after it was announced with "Padam Padam". This is Minogue's third album with BMG and Darenote, following Disco and Golden. Tension was released on 22 September 2023, in both standard and deluxe versions; both include 11 original tracks, with the deluxe version featuring "Love Train", "Just Imagine", and "Somebody to Love". During the album's release week, a digital bonus version with two additional tracks, "Heavenly Body" and "Drum", was made available on Minogue's website for a limited time. Studio Moross handled the album's photoshoot and cover; Haris Nukem photographed it, and Aries Moross handled the creative direction. The album cover depicts Minogue holding a large diamond that covers one of her eyes, with the album title above and Minogue's logo below; her skin colour scheme is green against an orange background. The standard digipak format for the album included four different colour shades.

In an interview with French magazine Numéro, Minogue revealed that Nukem based the photograph on a sketch he created and came up with the idea of her holding a diamond after telling her, "I don't know why, but I see you holding this diamond." Minogue considered naming the album Vegas High, but changed her mind, saying "I hope this doesn't sound depressing - when you watch the news, the word is used negatively - but actually, once we decided that, I was pleasantly surprised that this title was well received. People were excited to listen to the album Tension". She went on to explain that the diamond represented the title Tension, saying, "The diamond is a subliminal image: that of the creation of beautiful things under pressure. I believe people can feel it through the cover, especially if they understand how diamonds are formed, i.e. under constraint."

Tension was released in a variety of digital, physical, and streaming formats. The standard version came in a digipak, while the deluxe edition was housed in a casebound book. Eight vinyls were released in a variety of colours, including black, orange, pink, green, silver with a gatefold package, and a clear vinyl shaped like a Coke bottle. 50 white test pressings with Minogue's autograph were distributed via her website, and a pop-up store in London promoting the album sold clear vinyl with a diamond holographic sleeve. Five cassettes were distributed in orange, green, blue, and pink colours, as well as a double cassette with deluxe edition content.

== Promotion ==
=== Singles and other songs ===
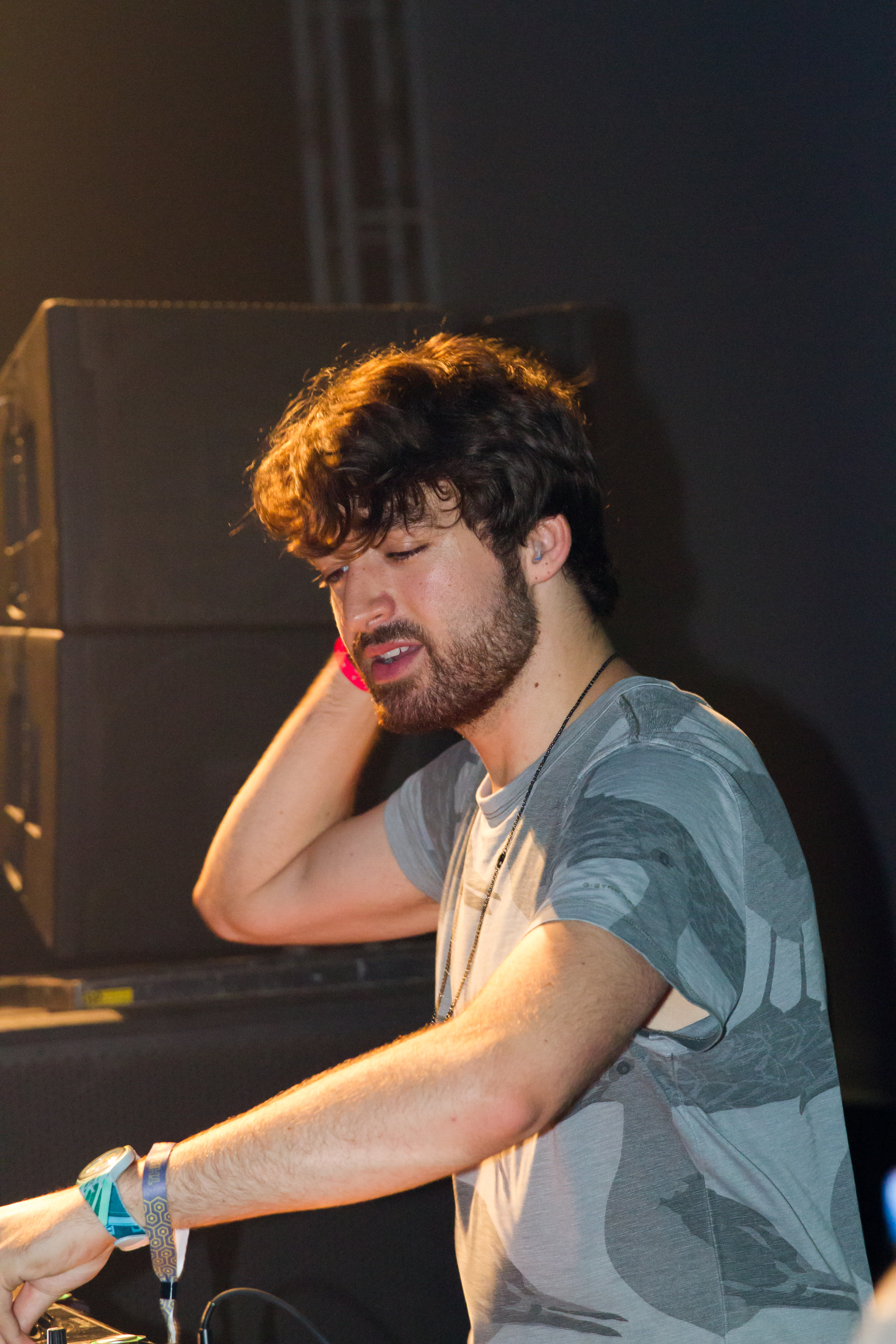
Tension promotional recording "10 Out of 10" featured Dutch DJ Oliver Heldens (pictured).

"10 Out of 10" was released as a promotional recording by Helden's label Kangarooli and RCA on 5 April 2023; Minogue is credited as a featured artist. It debuted three days earlier on Heldens' YouTube channel, where it was featured on Heldeep Radio episode 457. Despite praise for its production value and blending Heldens and Minogue's sounds, some critics were divided on the inclusion of Tension. It peaked at number 19 on the UK Download and Singles Charts, and also charted in Belarus, Estonia, Latvia, and Russia.

On 17 May, "Padam Padam" was released as the album's lead single by BMG and Darenote; additional releases of the single were made available at later dates through Minogue's web store. It received positive feedback for its catchiness, production quality, and overall sound; several publications and critics praised it as one of the year's best songs, one of Minogue's career highlights, and it received numerous awards and nominations. It was a sleeper hit for Minogue, charting in several territories and receiving certification in her native Australia, Brazil, and the United Kingdom. Sophie Muller created a music video visually inspired by The Man Who Fell to Earth (1976) and Americana culture. Since its release, "Padam Padam" has gained significance within popular culture, becoming a viral phenomenon, a pioneer in bridging the generational gap between younger audiences and mature performers, a notable gay anthem, and an icon of LGBT culture.

"Tension" was released on 31 August in various digital, physical, and streaming formats. Critics lauded its experimental sound and overall production quality. Commercially, it performed moderately, placing in the top ten on component charts in Australia, Latvia, Nicaragua, the United Kingdom, Malta, and New Zealand. Muller directed a music video for the song, which featured various caricatures of Minogue on a futuristic set. Like "Padam Padam", the title track became a viral sensation and was hailed as a gay anthem and symbol of LGBT culture.

"Hold on to Now" was the album's final single, released on 30 October. Despite receiving praise for its production and athematic qualities, the song only charted in Australia, Germany, New Zealand, the United Kingdom, and the United States. A music visualiser featuring Minogue was uploaded to her YouTube channel. Following the release of Tension, she posted visualisers for "Things We Do for Love", "You Still Get Me High", "Green Light", "10 Out of 10", and "Story" on her YouTube page, as well as lyric videos for "One More Time", "Hands" and "Vegas High." In the United Kingdom, the song spent one week at number 69 on the UK Singles Sales and number 67 on the UK Downloads chart.

=== Live performances and More Than Just a Residency ===
"I want it to be the kind of essence of what a Kylie show has become, enough glamour and abandon. I’ve got some versions of songs that have not been heard, like reinterpretations of songs, which is exciting. Live bed dances, amazing costumes. That’s the base and then we’ll see what surprises we can come up with

— Minogue commenting on More Than Just a Residency.

Minogue first promoted the record on American Idol, where she performed "Padam Padam" and "Can't Get You Out of My Head". In June, she appeared as a special guest and performed the same songs at Capital's Summertime Ball. She performed "Padam Padam" as part of her nine-track setlist for the iHeartMedia KTUphoria 2023 live show. She also appeared on two shows hosted by American personality Andy Cohen: Cohen's Watch What Happens Live! and the SiriusXM radio show. She also performed "Padam Padam" twice at the Horse Meat Disco event due to technical difficulties during the first performance. Minogue and Tears for Fears co-headlined Radio 2 in the Park at Victoria Park in September, exactly one week before the album's release. She headlined the festival's second and final night with performances of "Padam Padam", "Tension", and "Hold On to Now".

Minogue attended the 2023 London Fashion Week launch at Lio London, where she performed several album tracks, including "Padam Padam" and "Tension". Minogue also opened a Kylie Pop-up Store in London from 22 September to 24 September. Minogue gave a free concert at the Shepherd's Bush Empire on 27 September 2023, and more than 100,000 people applied for the 2,000 tickets. Minogue performed "Padam Padam" at the opening ceremony of the inaugural Las Vegas Grand Prix on 15 November 2023. The next night, she performed several songs with Mark Ronson on the T-Mobile Arena stage in front of the Sphere. Minogue wrapped up the Formula One weekend on 18 November with a performance at the Monaco Grand Prix's Amber Lounge. Songs from Tension were featured in An Audience with..., a television concert special filmed at the Royal Albert Hall on 1 December 2023 and aired on ITV on 10 December and Boxing Day 2023.

On 28 July, Minogue announced that she would start her first concert residency, titled More Than Just a Residency. The announcement came after Minogue teased the residency on Watch What Happens Live. Minogue went on to say that the residency had been planned three years in advance and that she would be performing new arrangements of her songs as well as tracks from Tension. She later teased both the show and the album track "Vegas High", which had not yet been released when the residency was announced. More Than Just a Residency began on 3 November 2023, at The Voltaire Club at The Venetian Las Vegas in Paradise, Nevada, and ended on 4 May 2024. It was both critically and commercially successful, with all performances quickly selling out.

=== Additional releases, Tension II and Tension Tour ===
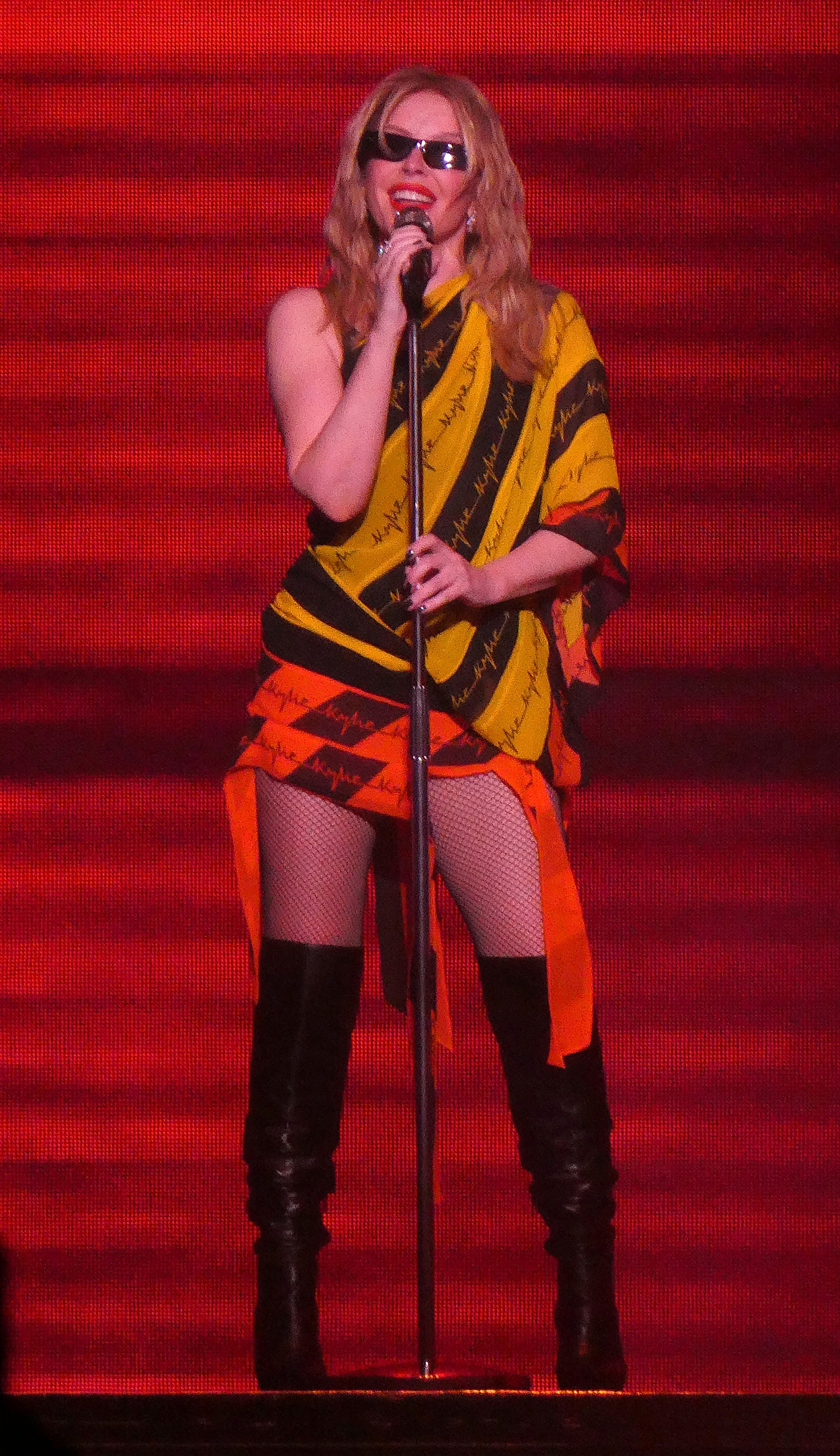
Minogue performing lead single "Padam Padam" on 2025's Tension Tour

Two months after Tension, Minogue announced the release of Extension: The Extended Mixes, a remix album featuring extended versions of the standard tracklist. BMG released it on digital and streaming platforms, as well as a double gatefold vinyl. Additionally, Tension was included in the album's digital formats. The album cover features the same artwork but in pink and green. Commercially, it charted in several countries, including Scotland, Australia, the United Kingdom, the United States, Belgium, and France. The extended mix of "Hold On To Now" served as the album's only single and was released alongside the original version. Variety announced in January 2024 that Tension would be repackaged and released later that year. The following month, Minogue hinted at working on new music during an interview at the 66th Annual Grammy Awards, where she won the inaugural Grammy Award for Best Pop Dance Recording for "Padam Padam". However, Minogue announced her seventeenth studio album, Tension II, along with the single "Lights Camera Action". Instead of a repackage, Tension II is a sequel to the original album, which "was never intended to be another volume of work" but eventually ended up with "enough" material for a new project. BMG and Darenote plan to release it on 18 October 2024.

Minogue first mentioned touring in an interview in July 2024, when she confirmed a possible return to Australia and the United Kingdom for shows. Minogue announced the Tension Tour on 20 September, the same day she revealed Tension II and "Lights Camera Action". This will be her first concert tour since Summer 2019 and the first series of shows since More Than Just a Residency. In response, she said, "I am beyond excited to announce the Tension tour 2025. I can't wait to share beautiful and wild moments with fans all over the world as we celebrate the Tension era and more." She confirmed that the tour will include many of her "greatest hits", but will primarily focus on and support material from Tension II, Tension, and Disco, three albums she did not tour with. The tour began on 15 February 2025, in Perth and travelled through Australia, Asia, Europe, North America, and South America.

== Critical reception ==
Professional ratings
Aggregate scores
Source	Rating
AnyDecentMusic?	8.1/10
Metacritic	86/100
Review scores
Source	Rating
AllMusic	4.5/5 stars
Classic Pop	5/5 stars
Crack	8/10
DIY	5/5 stars
The Observer	4/5 stars
NME	4/5 stars
Pitchfork	7.3/10
PopMatters	9/10
Rolling Stone UK	4/5 stars
Slant Magazine	3.5/5 stars

Tension received universal praise from music critics. Metacritic, which assigns a weighted average based on ratings from publications, gave the album an 86 out of 100 based on 16 reviews, indicating "universal acclaim". According to AnyDecentMusic?, which assigns a weighted average based on publication ratings, the album received an 8.1 out of 10 rating from 18 reviews. It is Minogue's highest-rated album on both sites, and Metacritic named it one of the top albums of 2023. Several publications named Tension one of Minogue's best works of her career.

Numerous reviews praised the album's pop appeal and overall influence on the current pop scene. Tension received five stars from Classic Pop editor John Earls, who described it as "built on confidence" and an "object lesson in truly memorable pop." Similarly, DIY writer Otis Robinson wrote, "There's enough originality pumped throughout each track that Tension will undoubtedly stand as one of the most favoured contemporary Kylie eras." Neil Z. Yeung of AllMusic described the album's energy as "custom-made for living in the moment and embracing cathartic release", adding, "Tension is a master class in pop wizardry and escapist bliss. Releasing an album this expertly crafted and stunning in her fifth decade in the industry is an absolute marvel to behold." David Smyth of The Standard called it "impeccable pop."

Other critics praised the album's fun nature and diverse sounds, as well as Minogue's contribution to the record. The Line of Best Fit editor Sam Franzini gave it a 9 out of 10, calling it a "knockout," while Lucy Harbon of Clash said Tension "heralds in a vibrant and fun new era that sees Kylie refreshed and ready to lead again." PopMatters editor Peter Piatkowski described it as "powerful, empowering, and, most importantly, fun", while Hannah Mylrea of Rolling Stone said it was "brilliantly good fun." Vera Maksymiuk of Riff gave Tension an 8 out of 10, calling it "purely joyous and alluring", while Devon Chodzin, a Paste magazine contributor, wrote: "There is plenty of material for the club to cycle through, and one can expect that the album cuts will gain new vitality on the dance floor, too." Retropop gave the album four stars, praising its sonic diversity and featuring some of her best vocal performances.

A few critics felt that the album was conventional for Minogue and that it lacked vulnerability. NME writer Nick Levine gave it four stars, saying that while Tension was not Minogue's "most cohesive or revealing" album, he thought each track was "driven by its own internal logic." Alexa Camp of Slant thought Minogue was playing it safe with the record, calling it "another Kylie Minogue album." Helen Brown of The Independent felt similarly about the album's "safe" quality, but added that "there's no denying the twirling pleasures" of Tension. According to Annabel Ross of The Sydney Morning Herald, Tension did a better job of "facilitating dance floor euphoria," but Minogue's "cheerful guardedness" throughout the album's content was the only "flaw." Guy Oddy of The Arts Desk praised some of the album's tracks and sounds while criticising others for a lack of "deep intellectual introspection".

== Accolades and awards ==
Minogue and her work on Tension won Best Pop Release at the 2023 ARIA Music Awards, as well as nominations for Best Solo Artist, Best Independent Release, and Song of the Year. Minogue received the most nominations for the ceremony since 2002 when she won five of seven. Minogue won Best Australian Act at the 2023 MTV Europe Music Awards, her first nomination and win since 2003. Throughout 2023, "Padam Padam" won Record of the Year at the Las Culturistas Culture Awards, and Minogue was nominated for Double J Artist of the Year at the J Awards. In 2024, Minogue was nominated for the Rolling Stone Global Award. At the IHeartRadio Music Awards, she and "Padam Padam" were nominated for Dance Artist and Dance Song of the Year.

At the 66th Annual Grammy Awards, "Padam Padam" won the inaugural Grammy Award for Best Pop Dance Recording, making her the first female recipient. It was her first Grammy nomination since X (2007) for Best Dance/Electronic Album in 2009, and her first win since "Come Into My World" in 2004. She won the Icon Award at the Billboard Women in Music Awards in March of that year. At the 2024 Brit Awards, she was nominated for International Act and received the Global Icon award for Outstanding Contribution to Music. "Hold on to Now" was nominated for Song of the Year at the 2024 APRA Music Awards. Both Tension and its title track have been nominated for Best Artist, Album of the Year, Best Pop Release, Best Independent Release, and Best Song at the 2024 ARIA Awards, which will take place on 20 November 2024.

Critics' rankings for Tension
Publication	Accolade	Rank	Ref.
Albumism	The 50 Best Albums of 2023	12	
AllMusic	100 Favorite Albums of 2023	—N/a	
AllMusic	2023 Favorite Pop Albums	—N/a	
Billboard	The 15 Best Dance Albums of 2023	—N/a	
Daily Record	Top Albums of 2023	9	
Dig!	Best Albums of 2023	25	
The Guardian	The 50 Best Albums of 2023	24	
Houston Chronicle	Joey Guerra's 10 Best Albums of 2023	2	
The Guardian	The Best Australian Albums of 2023	—N/a	
GQ Australia	The 23 Best Albums of 2023	20	
Metacritic	The 40 Best Albums of 2023	30	
The Music	The Best Australian albums of 2023	—N/a	
NME	The 25 Best Australian Albums of 2023	14	
PopCrush	30 Best Pop Albums of 2023	—N/a	
PopMatters	The 80 Best Albums of 2023	16	
PopMatters	The 20 Best Pop Albums of 2023	2	
Retropop	Top 10 Albums of 2023	10	
Riff	45 Best Albums of 2023	20	
Rolling Stone	The 100 Best Albums of 2023	45	
Rolling Stone Australia	The 25 Best Australian Albums of 2023	7	
Rolling Stone Australia	The 100 Best Australian Albums of the 2020s So Far	8	

== Commercial performance ==
"All hail the queen. On behalf of everyone at ARIA, and as a superfan, it is my absolute pleasure to congratulate Kylie for her fourth consecutive #1 album debut. It's a thrill to see an ARIA Hall of Fame artist continue to dominate, reinvent and represent Australian music on such a global scale. We can't wait to celebrate her success at this year's awards."

— Annabelle Herd, CEO of the Australian Recording Industry Association (ARIA), congratulating Minogue on the success with Tension in Australia.

Tension debuted at number one on the Australian Albums Chart and Australian Independent Albums Chart, becoming Minogue's fourth consecutive number-one album and eighth overall in the former. Annabelle Herd, CEO of the Australian Recording Industry Association (ARIA), congratulated Minogue on her achievements, saying, "It's a thrill to see an ARIA Hall of Fame artist continue to dominate, reinvent and represent Australian music on such a global scale. We can't wait to celebrate her success at this year's awards." In New Zealand, the album debuted at number five on the regional albums chart, becoming her best-charting album since Fever. In Ireland, the album debuted at number two on the regional albums chart and became her third consecutive album to top the Independent Albums Chart.

Tension debuted at number one on the UK Albums Chart, making it Minogue's ninth number-one album and her fourth consecutive entry since Golden. According to the Official Charts Company, Tension outsold the rest of its top 20 competitors four days after its release, with total first-week sales of 53,237 album-equivalent units. This was the fifth-highest opening sales for a record in the UK in 2023, and the third-best-selling vinyl album of the year. Minogue also became the tenth solo act with the most UK number-one albums, tying Bob Dylan, and the third female artist, trailing only Taylor Swift (10) and Madonna (12). Tension also debuted at number one on the Scottish Albums Chart, marking her fifth appearance there. Since its release, the British Phonographic Industry (BPI) has certified it as gold for exceeding 100,000 unit shipments.

Tension debuted in Japan on two Oricon component charts, at 19 on the digital and 20 on the Western chart. It also debuted at 65 on Billboard Japan's Hot Albums chart. Tension became her most successful album in the Netherlands, debuting at number three on the Dutch Album Top 100. In Belgium, it was Minogue's first number-one album on the Wallonia Ultratop Albums Chart and her highest-charting record on the Flanders Ultratop Albums Chart. Tension debuted at number two on the Swiss Albums Top 100 and the Spanish Top 100 Albums charts, matching Minogue's highest chart position in Switzerland and Spain, Aphrodite (2010). The album debuted at number 31 on the Danish Albums Chart, marking her first appearance since Kiss Me Once (2014).

Tension debuted at number 21 on the Billboard 200 in the United States, marking her third highest-charting album there. It sold 24,500 total album-equivalent units in its first week, with 19,500 of those being pure sales, making it Minogue's best first-week sales since Body Language (2003), which sold 43,500. It also debuted at number one on the Billboard Dance/Electronic Albums chart, her second consecutive album to do so after Disco, and peaked at number four on the Independent Albums chart, where it shared a spot with Disco. In Canada, Tension debuted at number 23 on the regional albums chart. As of September 2024, Tension had sold over 500,000 units worldwide and gained half a billion streams.

== Track listing ==
Tension – Standard edition
No.	Title	Writer(s)	Producer(s)	Length
1.	"Padam Padam"	Peter Rycroft; Ina Wroldsen	Lostboy	2:46
2.	"Hold on to Now"	Kylie Minogue; Biff Stannard; Duck Blackwell; Jon Green	Stannard; Blackwell; Green	3:57
3.	"Things We Do for Love"	Minogue; Kamille; Stannard; Blackwell; Green; Anya Jones	Stannard; Blackwell; Green	3:09
4.	"Tension"	Minogue; Kamille; Stannard; Blackwell; Green; Jones	Stannard; Blackwell	3:36
5.	"One More Time"	Minogue; Stannard; Blackwell; Green	Stannard; Blackwell	3:02
6.	"You Still Get Me High"	Minogue; Stannard; Green	Stannard; Blackwell; Green	3:38
7.	"Hands"	Mich Hansen; Daniel Davidsen; Kasper Larsen; Ryan Ashley	Cutfather; Davidsen; KayAndMusic; Ashley^{[a]}	2:45
8.	"Green Light"	Davidsen; Peter Wallevik; Ruby Spiro	PhD	3:19
9.	"Vegas High"	Minogue; Stannard; Blackwell; Gez O'Connell	Stannard; Blackwell	3:33
10.	"10 Out of 10" (with Oliver Heldens)	Heldens; James Abrahart; Liana Banks; Jackson Foote; Sarah Hudson; Minogue	Heldens; Foote; Blackwell^{[a]}	2:51
11.	"Story"	Minogue; Stannard; Blackwell; O'Connell	Stannard; Blackwell	3:16
Total length:				35:51

Tension – Deluxe edition (bonus tracks)
No.	Title	Writer(s)	Producer(s)	Length
12.	"Love Train"	Minogue; Sky Adams; Maegan Cottone	Adams	2:55
13.	"Just Imagine"	Carl Ryden; Karen Poole	Ryden	2:36
14.	"Somebody to Love"	Minogue; Stannard; Blackwell; Green	Stannard; Blackwell	3:52
Total length:				45:14

Tension – Digital bonus edition (bonus tracks)
No.	Title	Writer(s)	Producer(s)	Length
15.	"Heavenly Body"	Minogue; Stannard; Blackwell; Green	Stannard; Blackwell	4:22
16.	"Drum"	Minogue; Stannard; Blackwell; Green	Stannard; Blackwell	3:31
Total length:				53:07

Extension: The Extended Mixes track list
No.	Title	Writer(s)	Producer(s)	Length
1.	"Padam Padam" (extended mix)	Rycroft; Wroldsen	Lostboy	4:04
2.	"Hold On to Now" (extended mix)	Minogue; Stannard; Blackwell; Green	Stannard; Blackwell; Green	5:28
3.	"Things We Do for Love" (extended mix)	Minogue; Kamille; Stannard; Blackwell; Green; Jones	Stannard; Blackwell; Green	4:54
4.	"Tension" (extended mix)	Minogue; Kamille; Stannard; Blackwell; Green; Jones	Stannard; Blackwell	4:38
5.	"One More Time" (extended mix)	Minogue; Stannard; Blackwell; Green	Stannard; Blackwell	4:22
6.	"You Still Get Me High" (extended mix)	Minogue; Stannard; Green	Stannard; Blackwell; Green	4:32
7.	"Hands" (extended mix)	Hansen; Davidsen; Larsen; Ashley	Cutfather; Davidsen; KayAndMusic; Ashley^{[a]}	4:09
8.	"Green Light" (extended mix)	Davidsen; Wallevik; Spiro	PhD	4:52
9.	"Vegas High" (extended mix)	Minogue; Stannard; Blackwell; Gez O'Connell	Stannard; Blackwell	5:12
10.	"10 Out of 10" (extended mix; with Oliver Heldens)	Heldens; Abrahart; Banks; Foote; Hudson; Minogue	Heldens; Foote; Blackwell^{[a]}	4:01
11.	"Story" (extended mix)	Minogue; Stannard; Blackwell; O'Connell	Stannard; Blackwell	4:22
Total length:				50:34

Notes

- ^{^a} signifies a vocal producer

== Personnel ==
Credits adapted from the liner notes of Tension.

=== Musicians ===
- Kylie Minogue – lead vocals (all tracks), backing vocals (tracks 8, 10)
- Peter Rycroft – keyboards, programming (1)
- Ina Wroldsen – vocals (1)
- Duck Blackwell – bass guitar, drums, guitar, keyboards (2–6, 9, 11, 14); backing vocals (5)
- Biff Stannard – percussion (2–6, 9, 11, 14), additional keyboards (2–6, 9, 14), backing vocals (2, 3, 5), keyboards (11)
- Jon Green – guitar (2–6), backing vocals (2, 3, 5, 6), keyboards (2, 5, 6)
- House Gospel Choir (Note: The House Gospel Choir consists of vocalists Cartell Green-Brown, Christian Idos, Cleo Miller-Stewart, Laura Davie, Laura Leon, Leanna Leid, Lewis Daniel, Liza MArie Jennings, and Monique Meade.) – choir (2)
- Natalie Maddix – choir direction, vocal arrangement (2)
- Liza Marie Jennings – vocal arrangement (2)
- Jonny Bird – guitar (3)
- Ms Marinade – additional rap (7)
- Elizabeth Loughrey – backing vocals (7)
- Ryan Ashley – backing vocals (7)
- Daniel Davidsen – bass guitar (7, 8); drums, guitar, keyboards, programming (7)
- Kasper Larsen – bass guitar, drums, keyboards, programming (7)
- Mich Hansen – percussion (7)
- Peter Wallevik – backing vocals, keyboards (8)
- Ruby Spiro – backing vocals (8)
- Thomas Edinger – saxophone (8)
- James Abrahart – backing vocals (10)
- Martin Bijelic – bass guitar, bells, clapping, drum machine, keyboards, synthesizer, vocal effects (10)
- Oliver Heldens – bass guitar, bells, clapping, drums, keyboards, percussion, synthesizer, vocal effects (10)
- Maegan Cottone – backing vocals (12)
- Karen Poole – backing vocals (13)
- Carl Ryden – drums, keyboards (13)

=== Technical ===
- Dick Beetham – mastering (1–9, 11–14)
- Guy Massey – mixing (1–9, 11–13)
- Dale Becker – mastering (10)
- Oliver Heldens – mastering, mixing (10)
- Serge Courtois – mixing (10)
- Peter Rycroft – engineering (1)
- Duck Blackwell – engineering (2–6, 9, 11, 14)
- Biff Stannard – engineering (3–6)
- Jonny Bird – engineering (3)
- Jon Green – engineering (4–6)
- Daniel Davidsen – engineering (7)
- Kasper Larsen – engineering (7)
- PhD – engineering (8)
- Sky Adams – engineering (12)
- Carl Ryden – engineering (13)
- Kylie Minogue – vocal engineering (1, 7, 8, 13), additional vocal engineering (2–4, 6, 11, 14)

Visuals

- Studio Moross – design
- Haris Nukem – photography

== Charts ==
=== Weekly charts ===
Weekly chart performance for Tension
Chart (2023)	Peak position
Australian Albums (ARIA)	1
Australian Independent Albums (AIR)	1
Austrian Albums (Ö3 Austria)	9
Belgian Albums (Ultratop Flanders)	2
Belgian Albums (Ultratop Wallonia)	1
Canadian Albums (Billboard)	23
Czech Albums (ČNS IFPI)	100
Danish Albums (Hitlisten)	31
Dutch Albums (Album Top 100)	3
Finnish Albums (Suomen virallinen lista)	8
French Albums (SNEP)	5
German Albums (Offizielle Top 100)	5
Hungarian Albums (MAHASZ)	22
Irish Albums (Official Charts)	2
Irish Independent Albums (IRMA)	1
Italian Albums (FIMI)	12
Japanese Hot Albums (Billboard Japan)	65
Japanese Digital Albums (Oricon)	19
Japanese Western Albums (Oricon)	20
New Zealand Albums (RMNZ)	5
Polish Albums (ZPAV)	25
Portuguese Albums (AFP)	4
Scottish Albums (Official Charts)	1
Spanish Albums (Promusicae)	2
Swedish Albums (Sverigetopplistan)	16
Swiss Albums (Schweizer Hitparade)	2
Swiss Albums (Les charts Romandy)	2
UK Albums (Official Charts)	1
UK Independent Albums (Official Charts)	1
US Billboard 200	21
US Independent Albums (Billboard)	4
US Top Dance Albums (Billboard)	1

Chart performance for Extension: The Extended Mixes
Chart (2023)	Peak position
Australian Albums (ARIA)	28
Australian Independent Albums (AIR)	1
Belgian Albums (Ultratop Flanders)	146
Belgian Albums (Ultratop Wallonia)	82
French Albums (SNEP)	157
Scottish Albums (Official Charts)	25
UK Albums (Official Charts)	75
UK Independent Albums (Official Charts)	3
US Top Dance Albums (Billboard)	16

=== Year-end charts ===
Year-end chart performance for Tension
Chart (2023)	Position
Australian Artist Albums (ARIA)	6
Australian Vinyl Albums (ARIA)	10
UK Cassette Albums (OCC)	3
UK CD Albums (OCC)	12
UK Vinyl Albums (OCC)	11

== Certifications ==
Certifications for Tension
Region	Certification	Certified units/sales
United Kingdom (BPI)	Gold	100,000^{‡}
^{‡} Sales+streaming figures based on certification alone.

== Release history ==
Tension release history
Region	Date	Format	Editions	Label	Ref.
Various	22 September 2023	CD; cassette; digital download; LP; streaming	Standard	Darenote; BMG	
Various	22 September 2023	CD; cassette; digital download; streaming	Deluxe	Darenote; BMG	
Various	25 September 2023	Digital download	Bonus edition	Darenote; BMG	
Various	6 November 2023	Digital download	Bonus deluxe edition	Darenote; BMG	
Various	8 December 2023	Digital download; 2xLP; streaming	Extension: The Extended Mixes	Darenote; BMG	

== See also ==
- 2024 in Australia
- List of 2023 albums
- List of number-one albums of 2023 (Australia)
- List of number-one albums of 2023 (Belgium)
- List of UK Albums Chart number ones of the 2020s
- List of UK top-ten albums in 2023
