= More Than Just a Residency =

Concert residency by Kylie Minogue

- Residency by Kylie Minogue
- Merch poster from the residency
- Location: Paradise, Nevada, United States
- Venue: Voltaire at The Venetian Las Vegas
- Associated album: Tension
- Start date: 3 November 2023
- End date: 4 May 2024
- Legs: 1
- No. of shows: 20

Kylie Minogue concert chronology
- Summer 2019 (2019–2020); More Than Just a Residency (2023–2024); Tension Tour (2025)

More Than Just a Residency, also called Kylie Minogue at Voltaire and Kylie Vegas (merchandising), was the first concert residency by Australian singer Kylie Minogue, in support of her sixteenth studio album Tension (2023). The residency was announced in August 2023, and ran at Voltaire at The Venetian Las Vegas from 3 November 2023 to 4 May 2024. The sold-out, intimate shows attracted massive pop royalty, including headline-making visits from Janet Jackson and Christina Aguilera.

== Background ==
During the start of the promotional cycle for her upcoming sixteenth studio album Tension (2023), Minogue was asked by several media outlets about touring, specifically touring in North America, and a Vegas Residency. Andy Cohen posed the question during her appearance on Watch What Happens Live with Andy Cohen, to which she responded "Very possibly". Rumours were fuelled when she posted a video to her accounts of the interaction, overlaid with social media posts from fans about a potential residency, along with various conversations mentioning the song "Vegas High" from the forthcoming album.

More Than Just a Residency was announced via Minogue's socials on 28 July 2023, posting a thirty-second video featuring videos of performances, as well as dates for the residency, backed by "Vegas High".

In a press release, Minogue stated that the show had been in development for three years, further stating that she felt she'd found the right time "somewhere in the middle" of her career where she'd "earned the right" to perform there.

I want it to be the kind of essence of what a Kylie show has become, enough glamour and abandon. I’ve got some versions of songs that have not been heard, like reinterpretations of songs, which is exciting. Live bed dances, amazing costumes. That’s the base and then we’ll see what surprises we can come up with

— Minogue on the premise of the show.

== Commercial performance ==
Minogue's residency was met with an overwhelming demand for tickets, with the first run of ten shows selling out within hours. Initially, ticketing challenges surfaced during the first release of tickets, however, this surge in interest prompted the theater's representatives to accommodate fans by announcing ten additional dates. The second release of shows sold out within 30 minutes of going on sale.

== Set list ==
The set list is from January 2024.

1. "Light Years"
2. "Your Disco Needs You"
3. "Come into My World"
4. "Vegas High"
5. "In Your Eyes"
6. "Get Outta My Way"
7. "Tension"
8. "Slow" / "Love to Love You Baby"
9. "Hold On to Now"
10. "Can't Help Falling in Love"
11. "Confide in Me"
12. "Spinning Around"
13. "The Loco-Motion"
14. "All the Lovers"
15. "Padam Padam"
16. "Can't Get You Out of My Head"
17. "Love at First Sight"

=== Notes ===
- "The One" was performed between "Can’t Get You Out of My Head" and "Love At First Sight" on 3 November 2023.
- "Supernova" was performed after "Light Years" on opening night; thereafter it was included as a transition into "Your Disco Needs You"
- Minogue performed "10 Out of 10" acapella during the 9 December 2023 and 19 January 2024 concerts.
- Minogue briefly performed ”Got to Be Certain” acapella during the 20 January 2024 concert.
- Minogue performed an acapella version of ”I Should Be So Lucky”, during a production delay, at the 4 May 2024 concert.

== Shows ==
List of concerts
Date	Attendance	Revenue
3 November 2023	—	—
4 November 2023	—	—
10 November 2023	—	—
11 November 2023	—	—
8 December 2023	—	—
9 December 2023	—	—
15 December 2023	—	—
16 December 2023	—	—
19 January 2024	—	—
20 January 2024	—	—
26 January 2024	—	—
27 January 2024	—	—
8 March 2024	—	—
9 March 2024	—	—
15 March 2024	—	—
16 March 2024	—	—
26 April 2024	—	—
27 April 2024	—	—
3 May 2024	—	—
4 May 2024	—	—
