= Tension (song) =

2023 single by Australian singer Kylie Minogue

Single by Kylie Minogue

from the album Tension
- Released: 31 August 2023
- Studio: Surrey Pool House, Surrey; Infinite Disco Studios, Paris
- Genre: Club; dance-pop; house; electropop
- Length: 3:36
- Label: Darenote; BMG
- Songwriters: Kylie Minogue; Kamille; Richard Stannard; Duck Blackwell; Jon Green; Anya Jones
- Producers: Richard Stannard; Duck Blackwell; Jon Green

Kylie Minogue singles chronology
"Padam Padam" (2023)	"Tension" (2023)	"Hold on to Now" (2023)

Music video
- "Tension" on YouTube

"Tension" is a song by Australian singer Kylie Minogue from her sixteenth studio album of the same name (2023). It was released on 31 August 2023 through BMG and Darenote, as the second single from the album. Minogue co-wrote the song with Camille "Kamille" Purcell, Anya Jones, and producers Duck Blackwell, Jon Green, and Richard "Biff" Stannard. It was conceived after Minogue, Blackwell, Green, and Stannard collaborated on various songs in Surrey and asked Purcell and Jones to assist them with new material.

Musically, "Tension" combines a variety of electronic dance genres, including club music, dance-pop, house, and electro-pop, and is regarded as one of Minogue's most experimental compositions. Lyrically, it is about sexual desire and feeling sexually attracted to a partner. Upon its release, "Tension" received positive reviews from music critics for its forward-thinking sound, production style, and overall sound, but few were ambivalent about its lyrical content and vocal performance. Nonetheless, the song appeared on year-end lists by Genius and Rolling Stone India, and it has been nominated for Song of the Year at the 2024 ARIA Music Awards.

Commercially, it reached the top ten of component charts in Australia, Latvia, Malta, New Zealand, Nicaragua, and the United Kingdom. Sophie Muller directed the music video, which featured Minogue in various outfits on a neo-futuristic set and received positive reviews from publications. To promote the song, it has appeared on Minogue's live sets, including the setlist for her More Than Just a Residency show. Since its release, it has become a viral phenomenon on social media and has become a notable gay anthem by the LGBTQ community.

== Writing and development ==
In August 2022, Minogue travelled to Surrey with long-time collaborators Duck Blackwell, Jon Green, Richard "Biff" Stannard, and Minogue's A&R representative Jamie Nelson to record new music for Minogue's album Tension. After their sessions, Nelson proposed to Minogue the idea of working with Anya Jones and Camille "Kamille" Purcell, which she accepted. Despite being initially intimidated, Purcell began to relax around Minogue. Regarding the impact of their collaboration, Purcell stated, "She was a household name for me and my family; I think it was just part of my DNA to know her name and music." They all contributed to the creation of two songs, "Things We Do for Love" and "Tension", the former serving as the third track on Tension. According to Minogue, working with Purcell and Jones provided her with the "female energy" she required for the parent album. Minogue described the initial demo as "out of place", with "edgy" lyrics, "exaggerated" processed vocals, and a "very deep club" sound, but that it "softened and finessed" as the song progressed. She mentioned how Purcell helped her gain confidence in the lyrics they wrote, particularly the line "Call me Kylie-ay-ay" during the recording process. In an interview on The Zane Lowe Shoe, Minogue talked about the process with all collaborators:

They came in with this incredible energy [Jones and Purcell]... 'Tension', it’s one of those ones that you don’t really even know how it happened. We were just vibing and all the whooping and stuff that we’ve kept on the record was literally us just screaming our heads off and going, 'Did you just say that? Did you just say that?' 'Yeah, I said it'. We were jumping on sofas and I mean, you’d have to get their take on it as well, but I remember it as that. I mean, we were in this pool house, so it was like the wrong place to record anything, we weren’t really thinking about recording, just writing and getting the vibe down, but a lot of it stayed on the record.

— Minogue on the writing process of "Tension".

== Composition ==
"The initial version was really out of place, and I wasn’t sure it would make the album. The lyrics were pretty edgy, the robo-voice was much more exaggerated — it just sounded very deep club. As it evolved, it was softened and finessed. Again, it was the shaping of the song that really stood out to me — it’s like a roller coaster ride, there are little diffusers that balance the song."

— Minogue partially discussing the development of "Tension".

"Tension" lasts three minutes and 37 seconds and combines elements of club music, dance-pop, house, and electro-pop. According to a Shore Fire Media press release, the song is a "dance floor smash" that is "full of euphoric abandon and is the natural successor to the 'Padam Padam' throne." Furthermore, the song is written in F major and includes a variety of instrumentation, such as distorted and robotic vocals, auto-tune, and piano riffs. Lyrically, it discusses sexual desires and being sexually attracted to a partner; The Line of Best Fit writer Sam Franzini honoured this example by comparing its themes to "Padam Padam" and Tension tracks, which share similar themes throughout, whereas Ky Stewart of Junkee said its "about finding your inner sexual desire and freeing your body, a message Kylie's long advocated for".

Liberty Dunworth of NME described the song as a "dance-inspired track" that showcases "Minogue channelling inspiration from both '90s house music and '00s club classics", while Alexa Camp of Slant Magazine described "Tension" as "the most forward-thinking track on the new album," comparing it to material from her tenth album, X (2007). The Arts Desk writer Guy Oddy described it as "trancey Euro-house cracker with an infectious piano riff", while Riff editor Vera Maksymiuk noted Eurodance elements, saying "It plays with the formula a bit, using a variety of synth sounds and other electronic production. The sweet melodic verses are paired with a hard and punchy hook, recalling the dance music of the last couple of decades." PopMatters writer Peter Piatkowski and AllMusic editor Neil Z. Yeung both thought the song was an ode to 1990s house music, while Medium noted the song's "dance-heavy piano melody and light-up dancefloor production". Hanna Mylrea of Rolling Stone compared its "vocal inflections and jangly piano riff" to the work of British singer Charli XCX, while Devon Chodzin of Paste compared it to the song "Eat Your Man" by Australian producer Dom Dolla and Canadian singer Nelly Furtado. Stereogum writer James Rettig described "Tension" as a "twitchily smooth dance song" that, unlike "Padam Padam," lacks "meme-inducing hooks".

== Release and promotion ==
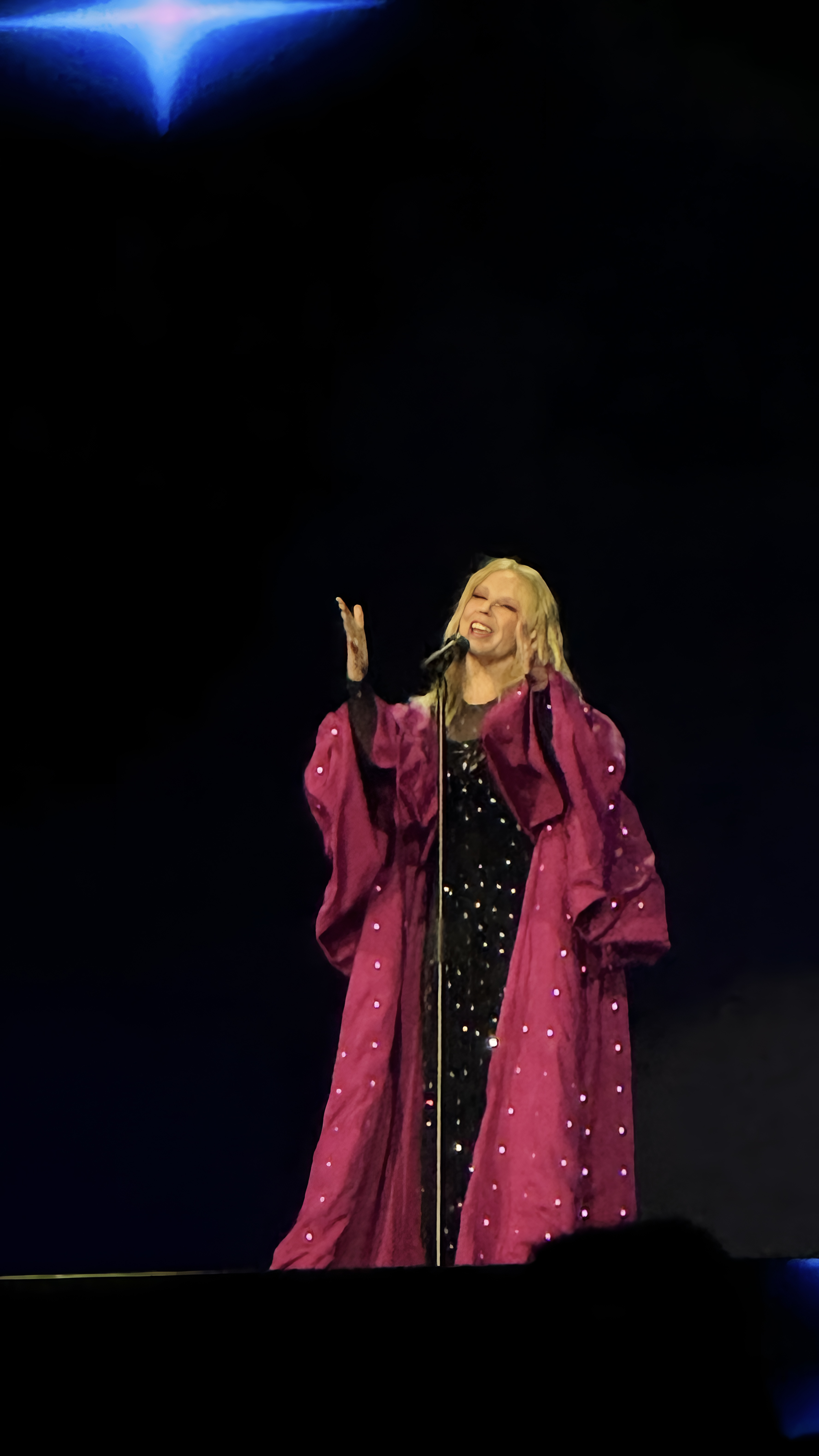
Minogue performing at Sziget Festival in Budapest, in 2024

On 30 August, Minogue teased the artwork and a snippet of the track. BMG and Minogue's company Darenote released "Tension" the next day, and served as the second single to Tension. The cover artwork for the single was created by Studio Moross, who handled Tension's promotional shooting and designs and was taken from the video shoot. It features five silhouettes of Minogue in various poses, all in green; a second artwork features a variation of different colours on each silhouette. The single was released in a variety of formats, including two CD singles, a cassette tape, and an exclusive digital download from Minogue's web store featuring the extended mix of the song. A digital extended play was also released, featuring remixes from Chromeo, George Reid, KDA, and Shadow Child. Later that year, a vinyl version was issued on 8 December. The extended version was added to Minogue's remix album Extension: The Extended Mixes (2023).

Minogue has performed the single multiple times to promote it. Minogue and Tears For Fears headlined Radio 2 in the Park, which took place in Victoria Park in Leicester. She headlined the festival's second night, closing with "Tension", "Padam Padam", and the album track "Hold On to Now". Minogue performed "Tension" and "Padam Padam" at Lio London's 2023 London Fashion Week launch party. Minogue performed "Tension" as part of a free, limited-time concert at the Shepherd's Bush Empire on 27 September. She included the song on her set list for the British live television series An Audience with.... Minogue performed the song at the BST Hyde Park show on 13 July 2024 and received critical acclaim for it. On 13 August, "Tension" was included in her performance at the Sziget Festival in Budapest, Hungary. "Tension" was used as a lip-sync song in the sixth season of the British reality competition show RuPaul's Drag Race UK. The track was used in a three-way lip-sync battle between contestants Chanel O'Conor, Lill, and Marmalade in which there was no elimination process, and Lill won.

== Critical reception ==
"Tension" received positive reviews from music critics. Yeung of AllMusic described the song as "sensual" with "another chorus for the ages", while Lucy Harbon of Clash called it "playful". DIY writer Otis Robison chose "Tension" as an album highlight while reviewing its parent album, calling it "euphoric". Similarly, Harry Tafoya of Pitchfork highlighted "Tension" and the album track "Padam Padam" as standouts, stating, "Both songs land on the right side of silly-serious and wield sledgehammer-subtle choruses with the feverish commitment required to make a hook like "Call me Kylie-lie-lie/Don't imitate-tate-tate/Cool like sorbet-et-et" feel ecstatic rather than clunky." The Guardian writer Kitty Empire described the song as "another dancefloor come-hither, but here, the coy sound of heartbeats is replaced by fruitier lines such as 'touch me right there'." The Sydney Morning Herald editor Annabel Ross wrote that the song and "Padam Padam" "rival[ed] for catchiness and sex positivity as Minogue, alternating between helium vocals and a robotic deadpan, coos "touch me right there" over clubby beats."

Maksymiuk of Riff wrote, "It plays with the formula a bit, using a variety of synth sounds and other electronic production. The sweet melodic verses are paired with a hard and punchy hook, recalling the dance music of the last couple of decades." Peter Piatkowski of PopMatters praised the track's inclusion on its parent album, writing, "The song also showcases just how accomplished Minogue is as a vocalist [...] The song’s inherent queerness means that Minogue dials the camp factor way up, and she slides into a stylized, near-scat that shows off a surprisingly supple and impressive range." Crack editor Michael Cragg called it "hot, heavy, and primarily controlled by Kylie's deepest desires," while Retropop writer Connor Groto described it as an "equally sensual electro-pop stormer underpinned by pulsing beats." Kyriakos Tsinivits of QNews called it "absolute pop perfection" and one of Minogue's best releases. PinkNews writer Marcus Wratten called the track "fresh, slick and steamy, which just about sums up the entire Tension era", and compared the lyric "Call me Kylie-lie-lie" to "It's Britney bitch" from "Gimme More" by American singer Britney Spears.

Few critics were ambivalent about Minogue's processed vocals and lyrical content. David Smyth of The Evening Standard had a mixed reaction, describing the track as "just fine" in comparison to other album tracks. Despite giving the parent album a glowing review, Jeremy Allen of The Quietus was critical of Minogue's vocals on the title track, writing that "It's auto-tuned and chopped up to the point where Minogue's vocal seems to have been replaced by a bawdy replicant with an eerie, automated American twang, juddering jarringly with the machine-like production." Similarly, Loud and Quiet writer described Minogue's vocals as "sounding more like a computer barking commands than the communication of any flesh-and-blood romance."

=== Impact ===
Following the viral success of the song's predecessor "Padam Padam", publications hailed "Tension" as a gay anthem and a notable track within the LGBTQ community upon its release. Beth Ashley of PinkNews highlighted the song's viral phenomenon of internet memes created on social media and commented, "To say that 'Tension' has sent LGBTQ+ fans into a frenzy would be an understatement [...]". According to the Australian Broadcasting Corporation, "Tension" is "already a crowd-pleaser with the Kylie Minogue faithful". Mathew Rodriguez of Them wrote an op-ed about "Tension", praising the song's sound, Minogue's craftsmanship, and how it captures 2000s aesthetics, citing the current resurgence of the Y2K aesthetic. "Tension" was ranked 47th in Genius' community-based 50 Songs of 2023, while Rolling Stone India ranked it third in 2023. Additionally, the song has been nominated for Song of the Year at the 2024 ARIA Music Awards.

== Commercial performance ==
In Australia, it spent a week at number 46 on the regional singles chart and number one on the Independent Singles chart. It also peaked at number three on the Australian Artist Singles chart and number 19 New Music Singles chart. In New Zealand, it missed the regional singles chart but debuted at number ten on the Hot Singles chart, her second top-ten entry since "Real Groove" in 2021. In the United Kingdom, the song was the highest-selling single that week and topped the charts for Singles Sales, Singles Downloads, and Physical Singles. It debuted at number 19 on the regional singles chart, the week's highest entry and Minogue's 53rd Top 40 single in the country. It also had moderate success in Croatia, as well as component charts in Germany, Italy, and Malta. In North America, "Tension" did not make the Canadian Hot 100, but it did reach number 47 on the Billboard Canadian Digital Songs chart for a week. In the United States, it peaked at 18 on the Dance/Electronic Songs chart and topped the Dance/Electronic Digital Song Sales chart. In South America, the song peaked at number 13 on Monitor Latino's English-language charts in Argentina, number 15 in Guatemala, number 12 in Colombia, and number two in Nicaragua.

== Music video ==
A shot of Minogue as three different characters, surrounded by a neo-futuristic set

The music video was directed by British filmmaker Sophie Muller and was filmed at XR (Extended Reality) Studios in Los Angeles. In the opening scene, Minogue enters a neon-lit blockhouse before walking into a futuristic set dressed in a large pink sweater dress. Further inside, she discovers a hologram of Minogue performing the song in a silver outfit and red wig. Another scene in the music video features Minogue dressed in all black in a control room. The video then shows Minogue dancing to the song in a hotel room. The following scene features Minogue in the pink sweater dress and Minogue in all-black meeting at a table, with another of her dressed as a showgirl dancing on it. The remaining footage combines several scenes of Minogue dancing and performing the track; Kitty Chrisp of Metro described it as Minogue "multiplying into many forms in an electrifying crescendo [...] exit[ing] the world with energy still visibly buzzing in and out of her body". It concludes with Minogue leaving the outpost she first entered.

The music video premiered on Minogue's YouTube channel on 1 September 2023, with a lyric video released on 19 September. A behind-the-scenes visual also appeared on her channel on 20 October. The music video received positive reviews from publications, with Bradley Stern, editor of MuuMuse, describing it as her "most bizarre, self-referential video in a long time, surely". He added, "Think 'Did It Again' alter egos, a splash of the "Come into My World" MCU (Minogue Cinematic Universe), a bit of 'GBI: German Bold Italic' experimentalism and Fever-era futurism, mixed with Doctor Who, a dash of The Fifth Element-and the Moulin Rouge! green fairy, for good measure." Kitty Chrisp of Metro praised the video, saying it is "set to be bold, beautiful, and full of Kylie's trademark pop-playfulness". Rodriguez of Them praised the visual, pointing out that Minogue played different characters and that it contained subtle references to Minogue's More Than Just a Residency tour, citing the desert-like scene at the beginning as a nod to Las Vegas.

== Formats and track listing ==
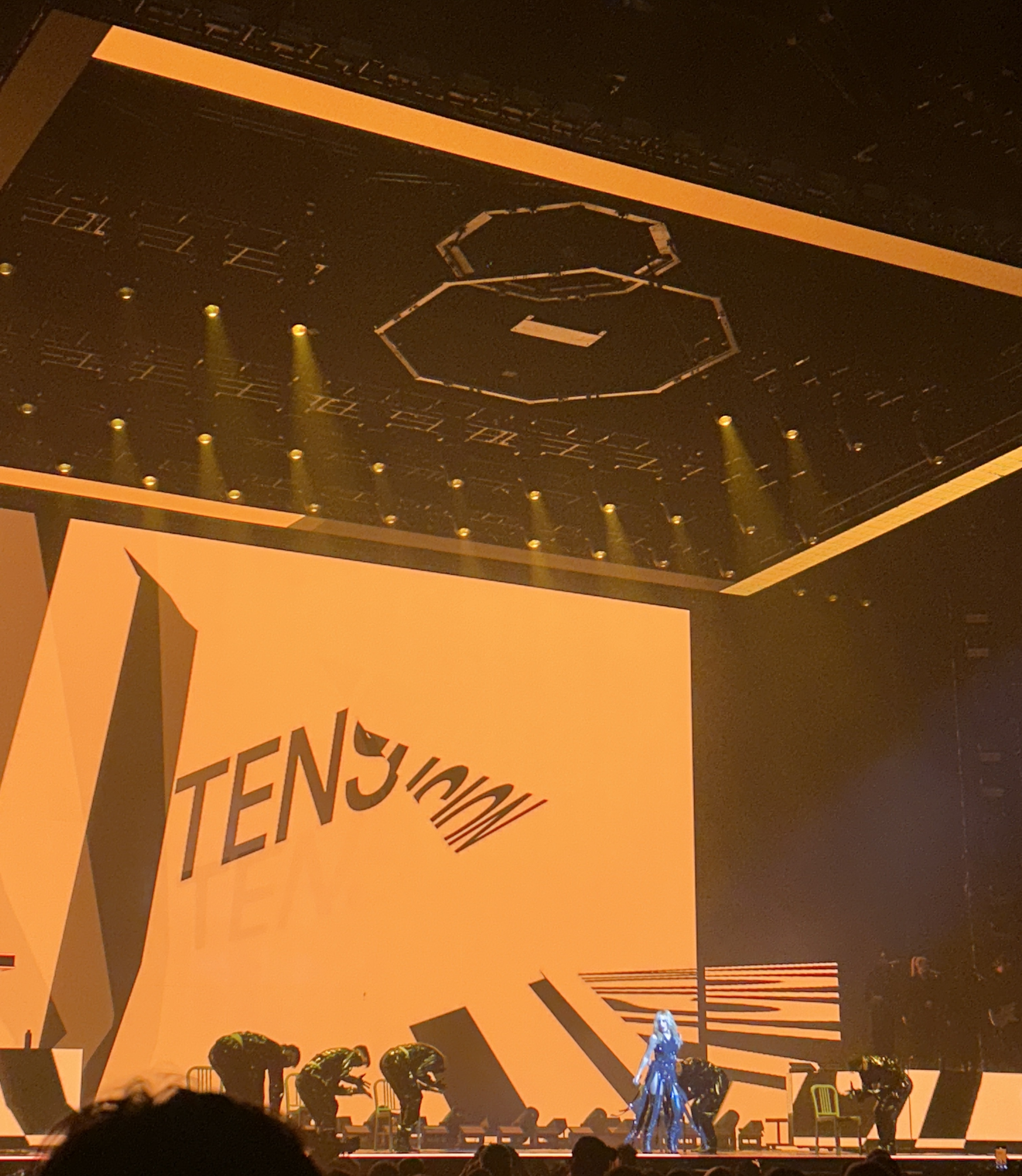
Minogue performing the song during her Tension Tour

Digital download / streaming

1. "Tension" – 3:36
2. "Padam Padam" – 2:46

CD and cassette single

1. "Tension" – 3:36
2. "Tension" (extended mix) – 4:40

Digital download (via Kylie.com)

1. "Tension" (extended mix) - 4:40

The Remixes – digital EP

1. "Tension" (Chromeo Remix) - 4:06
2. "Tension" (George Reid Remix) – 3:06
3. "Tension" (KDA Remix) – 3:15
4. "Tension" (Shadow Child Remix) – 3:36
5. "Tension" – 3:36

== Credits and personnel ==
Credits adapted from the liner notes of Tension.

Locations

- Recorded at Surrey Pool House, Surrey, UK; Infinite Disco Studio, Paris.

Personnel

- Kylie Minogue – lead vocals, writing, additional engineering
- Kamille – writing
- Anya Jones – writing
- Duck Blackwell – writing, production
- Biff Stannard – writing, production
- Jon Green – writing,
- Dick Beetham – mastering
- Guy Massey – mixing

== Charts ==
=== Weekly charts ===
Weekly chart performance
Chart (2023)	Peak position
Argentina Anglo (Monitor Latino)	15
Australia (ARIA)	46
Australia Independent (AIR)	1
Canada Digital Song Sales (Billboard)	47
Colombia Anglo (Monitor Latino)	12
Croatia International Airplay (Top lista)	28
Germany Download (Official German Charts)	30
Guatemala Anglo (Monitor Latino)	15
Ireland (IRMA)	34
Italy Independent (Radiomonitor)	21
Latvia Airplay (LaIPA)	2
Lithuania Airplay (TopHit)	26
Malta Airplay (Radiomonitor)	10
New Zealand Hot Singles (RMNZ)	10
Nicaragua Anglo (Monitor Latino)	2
UK Singles (Official Charts)	19
UK Indie (Official Charts)	5
US Dance Airplay (Billboard)	6
US Hot Dance/Electronic Songs (Billboard)	18

=== Monthly charts ===
Monthly chart performance
Chart (2023)	Peak position
Latvia Airplay (TopHit)	33
Lithuania Airplay (TopHit)	58

=== Year-end charts ===
Year-end chart performance
Chart (2024)	Position
US Dance/Mix Show Airplay (Billboard)	41

== Release history ==
Release history
Region	Date	Format	Label	Ref(s).
Various	31 August 2023	Digital download; streaming	Darenote; BMG	
Various	7 September 2023	CD single	Darenote; BMG	
Italy	9 September 2023	Radio airplay	Darenote; BMG	
Various	12 September 2023	Cassette	Darenote; BMG	
Various	20 October 2023	Remixes	Darenote; BMG	
Various	8 December 2023	7" vinyl	Darenote; BMG	
