= Hold on to Now =

2023 single by Australian singer Kylie Minogue

Single by Kylie Minogue

from the album Tension
- Released: 30 October 2023
- Recorded: 2022
- Studio: Biffco Studios, Brighton; The Pool Studio, Bermondsey; Infinite Disco Studio, Melbourne
- Genre: Synth-pop; electropop
- Length: 3:57
- Label: Darenote; BMG
- Songwriters: Kylie Minogue; Richard Stannard; Duck Blackwell; Jon Green
- Producers: Richard Stannard; Duck Blackwell; Jon Green

Kylie Minogue singles chronology
"Tension" (2023)	"Hold on to Now" (2023)	"Dance Alone" (2024)

Lyric video
- "Hold on to Now" on YouTube

"Hold on to Now" is a song by Australian singer Kylie Minogue. BMG Rights Management and Minogue's company Darenote released it for airplay on 30 October 2023, and then distributed it in various digital and physical formats between November and December that same year. Minogue wrote the song with producers Jon Green, Duck Blackwell, and her longtime collaborator Richard "Biffco" Stannard. "Hold on to Now" was one of the first songs written for the album Tension. It was developed from a sample melody Minogue sent to Stannard via voice note.

Minogue considers "Hold on to Now" to be one of her favourite songs from the album. It is a synth-driven track with electronic music elements and gospel sections performed by the House Gospel Choir. The song's lyrics address Minogue's desire to ask existential questions and seek answers. Music critics praised "Hold on to Now" for the singer's vocals, songwriting skills, and overall production quality. Some critics have compared it to the work of the Swedish singer Robyn. The song was also shortlisted for Song of the Year at the 2024 APRA Music Awards.

Prior to its official release, "Hold on to Now" charted in Australia, Germany, New Zealand, the United Kingdom, and the United States, and it was the UK's 18th best-selling vinyl single in 2023. To promote the song, Minogue uploaded a lyric video to her YouTube channel, alongside various album visualisers that debuted on the same day as the album's release. Minogue also performed the song at several live events, including her More Than Just a Residency show in Las Vegas, Nevada.

== Writing and development ==
In 2022, Minogue began working on new music during her downtime. She visited her friend and long-time collaborator, Richard "Biffco" Stannard, and they started working together. According to Stannard, they were only experimenting with sounds, without initially planning to create an album. One of the pieces conceived prior to the sessions was a voice note that Minogue had sent to Stannard featuring a simple "na-na-na" melody. They later brought in producer and multi-instrumentalist Duck Blackwell and, together with songwriter Jon Green, the group developed "Hold on to Now," one of the first tracks to emerge from the sessions.

Blackwell stated that Minogue and Biffco were "very welcoming," and he immediately felt comfortable sharing his personal stories, which helped shape "Hold on To Now." Biffco and Blackwell co-produced the song, alongside Green, who contributed to the song's production and songwriting process. The track was recorded at Biffco Studios in Brighton, The Pool Studio in Bermondsey, and Infinite Disco Studios in Melbourne. Ben Loveland served as the recording engineer, with additional engineering assistance from James Pinfield-Wells and Minogue herself. Guy Massey mixed the song, which also features the House Gospel Choir, directed by Natalie Maddix.

== Composition ==
"I wanted to write about the fact that we spend so much time wondering where we're going that we forget to enjoy the present moment, even though that moment isn't going to last. This title is about that period of time when I'm looking for answers, and I can't find them."

— Minogue discussing the themes of "Hold on to Now".

"Hold on to Now" is a three-minute, 58-second synth-driven track with electronic music elements. The song is written in the key of B minor. According to Michael Cragg of Crack, the song's sound is "synth-slathered", while Neil Z. Yeung of AllMusic describes it as "encouraging uplift" with "sparkles and builds to a joyous chorus, atop intergalactic synths and subtle New Order-esque guitar noodling". According to Vera Maksymiuk of Riff, the track features a "super-charged bass line and ethereal synths as she reassures us that "we can keep dancing forever".

Some critics likened the sound to that of Swedish singer Robyn. The Financial Times writer Ludovic Hunter-Tilney described the song as "euphoric electronic pop with a Robyn-esque tinge of melancholy". In his review of the song's parent album, Tension, Harry Tafoya of Pitchfork described it as a "Robyn-esque plea for romantic faith". PinkNews editor Marcus Watten described the song's sound as feeling like a "little, celestial sister to her 2020 single 'Say Something,' with a sprinkling of Robyn's 2018 comeback smash 'Honey'".

The song's lyrics speak to Minogue's desire to ask and answer existential questions. In an Apple Music review, Minogue explained the song's lyrical process, saying, "But it's about searching—when you’re so busy searching for answers, you forget being in the present. That's why that speaks to me. I'm really very fond of it." Minogue also stated in a podcast episode of the Zach Sang Show that "Hold on to Now" is more "expressive" than the other songs on the album. According to Annabel Ross of The Sydney Morning Herald, the song is a "twinkling power ballad that hits the upper limits of tolerable schmaltz". Ross interpreted the lyrics as "Minogue being lonely, and she searches for something more meaningful".

== Release ==
On 30 October 2023, BMG Rights Management and Minogue's company Darenote released "Hold On to Now" on airplay platforms in Italy. Later, the extended version of the single was distributed on digital platforms to promote Extension (The Extended Mixes) (2023); following that, the original version was distributed in five formats: digitally and through streaming on 2 November, featuring two mixes of the song, CD single and cassette tape on 10 November, and vinyl record on 8 December, including the extended mix of the song. Prior to its release, Minogue teased the song's announcement and release date on social media. The cover artwork was created by Studio Moross and is based on images from the parent album's photo shoot.

== Critical reception ==
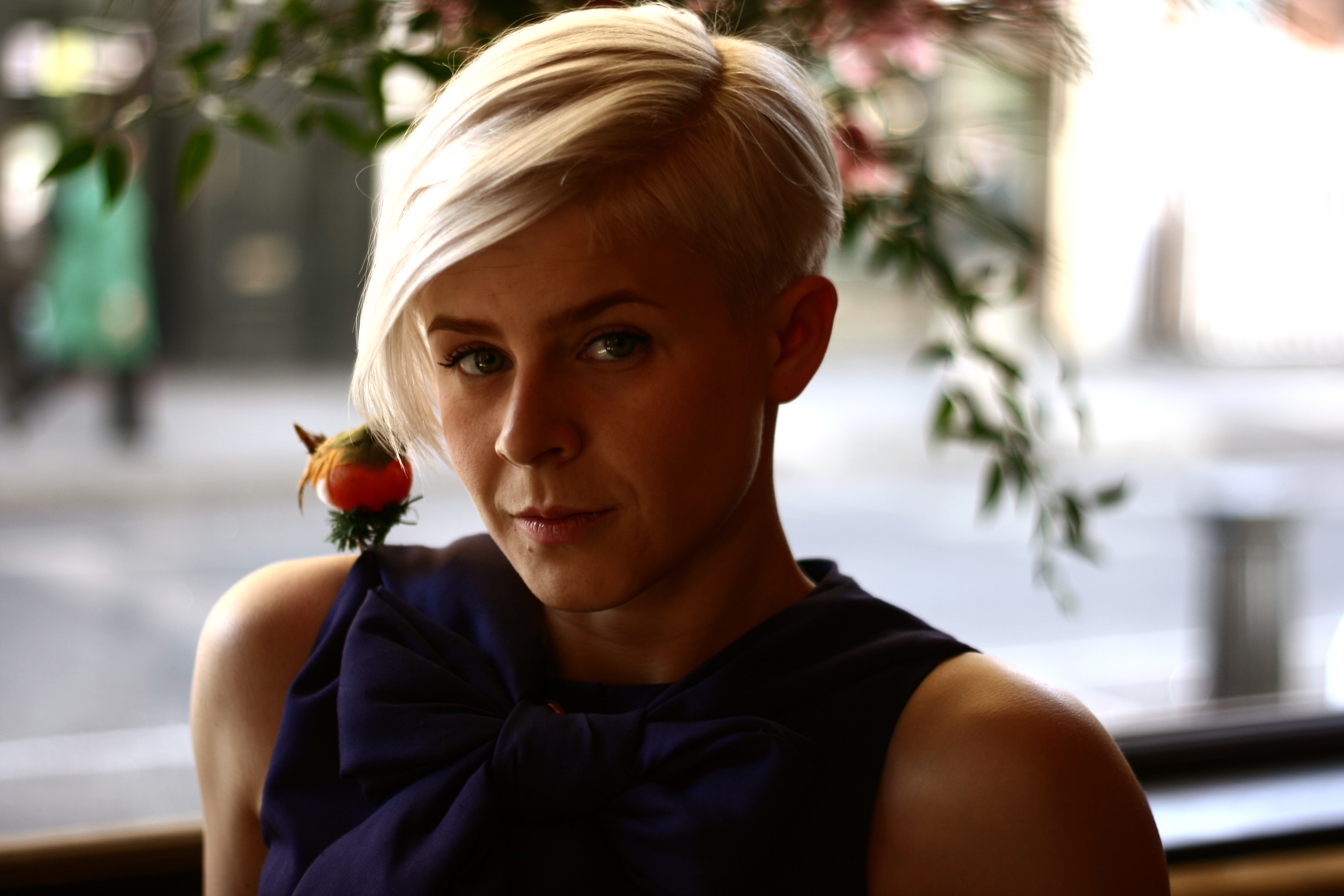
"Hold on to Now" was compared by music critics to the work of Swedish singer Robyn (pictured).

"Hold on to Now" received positive reviews from music critics, and Minogue considers it one of her favourite songs from the album. Neil Z. Yeung of AllMusic described the song as one of the album's highlights. Hannah Mylrea of Rolling Stone describes it as "late-night shimmer" and compares it to Minogue's 2010 single "Get Outta My Way" for "conjuring the same jubilation". According to NME writer Nick Levine, the song "feels like an upbeat successor" to Minogue's 2020 single "Say Something" and is the "sonic equivalent of a burst of confetti". According to Medium, the track "has a beautifully astronomical sound that soars upward as the glittering synths and choir erupt". The Music editor Bryget Chrisfield described it as a "wistful dancefloor banger".

Alexa Camp of Slant Magazine described it as "lightweight and anthemic", adding that the song is in the "vein" of Minogue's previous releases, including 2010's "All the Lovers" and 2014's "Into the Blue". Camp also stated that Minogue's vocals "coasts on a cloud of percolating synths backed by a gospel choir and a soaring guitar solo". Variety contributor Todd Gilchrist praised the song's musical direction and production quality, writing that it "feels destined for an unforgettable end-of-night music festival encore, complete with a gospel choir backing Minogue up".

Marcus Watten of PinkNews labelled the track as the fourth best song on the parent album, while Andrew Ryce of Resident Advisor described it as the album's "carpe diem paean". Stereogum's Katherine St. Asaph gave the track a glowing review, stating that "the song is the surest of bets: an arpeggiated, shimmering crescendo of a pop tune about making it through hardship, one instant after another". She described it as "top-shelf material" and concluded that it "would be a near-perfect eleventh-hour album track in anyone's hands". The song was also shortlisted for Song of the Year at the 2024 APRA Music Awards.

== Commercial performance ==
"Hold on to Now" charted prior to its official release. During the release week of Tension, "Hold on to Now" debuted at number 21 on the New Zealand Hot Singles chart and stayed there for a week. In Australia, the song peaked at number 24 on the Digital Track chart and became her third number-one single from the album to top the Independent Singles chart by Australian Independent Record Labels Association (AIR). In Germany, the song peaked at number 65 on the Downloads chart.

In the United Kingdom, "Hold on to Now" spent one week at number 81 on the UK Singles Chart, as well as number three on the Single Sales Chart, 17 on the Singles Download chart, and 36 on the Independent Singles Chart. When it was released physically, it reached number two on the Physical Singles chart and third on the Vinyl Singles chart. However, by the end of 2023, it was the 18th best-selling vinyl in the UK. In the United States, "Hold on to Now" reached number 32 on the Dance/Electronic Songs chart and 10 on the Dance/Electronic Digital Songs chart.

== Promotion ==
On 22 September 2023, Minogue's YouTube channel released the lyric video for "Hold on to Now" along with other visualisers for the album. It shows Minogue sitting in a neo-futuristic room and singing the lyrics to the song featured in the video. To further promote the song, Minogue gave her first live performance of "Hold on to Now" during her headlining set at Radio 2 in the Park in September 2023; I editor Shaun Curran gave it four stars out of five. Minogue performed the song at her one-off show at London's O2 Shepherd's Bush Empire later that month. She also included the song on the setlist for her Las Vegas residency show, More Than Just a Residency.

== Formats and track listings ==
- 2-track CD single, cassette, 7-inch vinyl and digital single
1. "Hold on to Now" – 3:57
2. "Hold on to Now" (Extended Mix) – 5:28
- Trance Wax Remix digital single
1. "Hold on to Now" (Trance Wax Remix) – 3:22
2. "Hold on to Now" – 3:57
- Trance Wax Extended Mix digital single
1. "Hold on to Now" (Trance Wax Extended Mix) – 5:37

== Credits and personnel ==
Credits adapted from the liner notes of Tension.

Locations

- Recorded at Biffco Studios, Brighton, UK; The Pool Studio, Bermondsey, UK; Infinite Disco Studio, Melbourne.

Personnel

- Kylie Minogue – lead vocals, additional engineering
- Duck Blackwell – bass guitar, drums, engineering, guitar, keyboards
- Biff Stannard – percussion, additional keyboards, backing vocals
- Jon Green – guitar, backing vocals, keyboards
- House Gospel Choir (Note: The House Gospel Choir consists of vocalists Cartell Green-Brown, Christian Idos, Cleo Miller-Stewart, Laura Davie, Laura Leon, Leanna Leid, Lewis Daniel, Liza Marie Jennings, and Monique Meade.) – choir
- Natalie Maddix – choir direction, vocal arrangement
- Liza Marie Jennings – vocal arrangement
- Dick Beetham – mastering
- Guy Massey – mixing
- Ben Loveland – recording engineer
- James Pinfield-Wells – assistant engineer

== Charts ==
=== Weekly charts ===
Chart performance for "Hold on to Now"
Chart (2023)	Peak position
Australia Digital Tracks (ARIA)	24
Australia Independent (AIR)	1
Germany Download (Official German Charts)	65
New Zealand Hot Singles (RMNZ)	21
UK Singles (Official Charts)	81
UK Indie (Official Charts)	36
US Hot Dance/Electronic Songs (Billboard)	32

=== Year-end charts ===
Year-end chart performance for "Hold on to Now"
Chart (2023)	Position
UK Vinyl Singles (OCC)	18

== Release history ==
"Hold on to Now" release history
Region	Date	Format	Label	Ref(s).
Italy	30 October 2023	Radio airplay	Darenote; BMG	
Various	2 November 2023	Digital download; streaming	Darenote; BMG	
Various	10 November 2023	CD single; cassette	Darenote; BMG	
Various	8 December 2023	7" vinyl	Darenote; BMG	
