= Padam Padam (song) =

2023 single by Kylie Minogue

Single by Kylie Minogue

from the album Tension
- Released: 18 May 2023
- Recorded: 2022
- Studio: Neverland, London; Infinite Disco Studio, London
- Genre: Dance-pop; synth-pop; electronic
- Length: 2:46
- Label: BMG; Darenote
- Songwriters: Peter Rycroft; Ina Wroldsen
- Producer: Lostboy

Kylie Minogue singles chronology
"Kiss of Life" (2021)	"Padam Padam" (2023)	"Tension" (2023)

Music videos
- "Padam Padam" on YouTube; "Padam Padam" (extended mix) on YouTube

"Padam Padam" is a song by Australian singer Kylie Minogue from her sixteenth studio album Tension (2023). It was released on 18 May 2023 through BMG and Darenote, as the lead single from the album. Written by Norwegian singer-songwriter Ina Wroldsen alongside its producer Lostboy, "Padam Padam" is a dance-pop and synthpop song with elements of electronic music and Eastern European sound. Lyrically, it touches on the topic of sexual encounters, with its title being an onomatopoeia for a heartbeat.

"Padam Padam" received critical acclaim from music critics, with many praising its catchiness and hook. Critics also singled it as a standout from the parent album. It won the inaugural Best Pop Dance Recording award at the 66th Annual Grammy Awards, as well as Record of the Year at the Las Culturistas Culture Awards and Best Pop Release at the 2023 ARIA Music Awards. Various music publications, including Billboard, The Guardian, Pitchfork, The New York Times, Rolling Stone, and Variety, placed "Padam Padam" on their Best Songs of 2023 lists.

Commercially, the song reached number one on the Israeli Singles Chart, number eight on the UK Singles Chart, and number 19 on the Australian Singles Chart. It also reached the top ten in various European countries and appeared on several component charts in the United States and Canada. It was certified platinum by the Australian Recording Industry Association (ARIA) and the British Phonographic Industry (BPI) and gold by Pro-Música Brasil (PMB), Productores de Música de España (PROMUSICAE) and the Recording Industry Association of America (RIAA).

The music video was directed by British filmmaker Sophie Muller. Shot in Los Angeles, it was visually inspired by the works of The Man Who Fell to Earth (1976) and elements of Americana culture. Minogue has made several live appearances to promote "Padam Padam" in the United Kingdom and North America. The song has become a viral phenomenon and has been recognised by notable publications for its cultural significance in pop culture. It has been dubbed an anthem within the LGBT community and has been played at pride parades. Furthermore, the track's success has been credited as a pioneer in bridging a generational gap between younger audiences and mature performers through social media and airplay.

== Background and development ==
After wrapping up promotional activities for her fifteenth studio album, Disco (2020), Minogue appeared on BBC Radio 2 to talk about new music, saying, "Perhaps it's going a bit more electropop. Don't quote me that [...] but that's what's on the boil at the minute." Minogue confirmed this in a June 2022 interview with Vogue, citing her 2003 single "Slow" as inspiration for the album's sound. That same year, Norwegian singer Ina Wroldsen and English producer Peter "Lostboy" Rycroft met in London in February 2022 to work on new music, and in two days, they wrote "Padam Padam". Regarding the song's title, Wroldsen stated, "I'm married to an Englishman, and my mother-in-law from north London would always go, 'Oh my heart's going ped-ou, ped-ou". Furthermore, Wroldsen said, "It was in my mind when I went to the studio, but 'ped-ou' doesn't sound very nice. So we created 'padam'." After finishing the song, they weren't sure who would record it, so they considered pitching it to British singer Rita Ora or a Eurovision contestant. Minogue's A&R Jamie Nelson sent Minogue the demo of "Padam Padam" while she was in Miami, and she fell in love with it. When asked about her reaction to the song, Minogue stated, "I loved the song, and the bonus is it felt like it was perfect for me."

== Recording and production ==
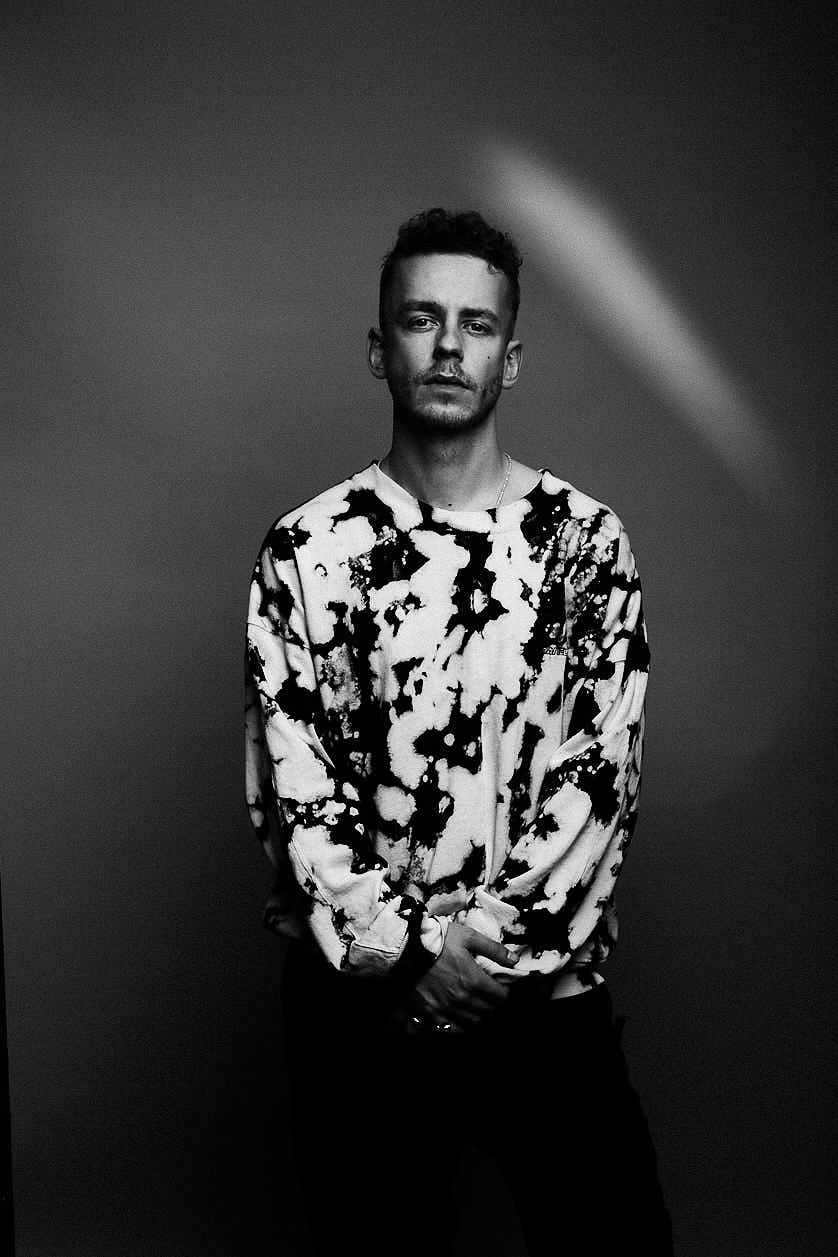
Lostboy (pictured in 2021) co-wrote and produced the track.

Minogue recorded the song's vocals by herself in a London hotel and is listed as the track's vocal engineer. Lostboy, described this remote recording process as "iconic". Once the vocal sessions were sent back to him, he went through the files and selected favorite takes, noting that the final version of the song was largely established after his first vocal edit. Rycroft emphasized that the vocal production acts as the cornerstone of the track, accounting for approximately 50% of the song's presence, which he believes contributes to its "sing-along" quality.

The instrumental foundation of the song is relatively minimalist, featuring a "hard, dark bass" and a "hard kick" influenced by dark electronic and industrial productions Rycroft was listening to at the time. To achieve a cohesive, "pulsing" sound, a sidechain effect was applied to both the synths and the vocals, causing the audio to dip whenever the kick drum hit. The track's structure also incorporates elements of underground club records, such as an 8-to-16-bar drum-and-bass fade-out, designed to make it easier for DJs to mix the record into other tracks.

Lostboy utilized extensive technical "trickery" to give the vocals a "weird industrial, robotic vibe" that contrasts with the natural sweetness of Minogue's voice. This included the use of a prominent vocoder in the choruses and a heavily saturated, "crunchy" lead vocal treated with widening effects. One unconventional technique involved using Waves Audio's Doubler plugin directly on the lead vocal bus before the compressor and EQ. This created a "trippy," wide sound by pitching and delaying the vocal to the left and right, effectively replacing the need for traditional vocal doubling.

Further manipulation was applied to the song's hook and spatial effects. The opening "Padam" vocal was pitch-shifted down an octave and saturated to the point where it functioned as a tonal instrument, shifting to fit each chord throughout the track. Rycroft also automated "super long" eight-second reverb sends in the chorus, timing them to trigger on specific beats and then cutting them harshly to move between "super open" and "absolutely dry" textures. Reflecting on the importance of these details, Rycroft stated, "I’m obsessed with vocal production... if you take all the vocals out, the track itself – the instruments and the drums – are so basic".

== Composition ==
"Padam Padam" is a dance-pop and synth-pop song that includes electronic music and lasts two minutes and 46 seconds. Shore Fire Media stated: "From the euphoric vocals, to the ridiculously infectious chorus and the heart-thumping electronic drum beat - this is an instant Kylie classic." The song is written in 4/4 time and is based on a phrygian dominant scale of C (a Mixolydian scale with lowered 9th (2nd) and lowered 13th (6th), which contributes to its tense quality. Lyrically, it explores sexual desire and attraction, with certain lyrics and the title serving as onomatopoeia for the heartbeat. Sam Franzini, a writer from The Line of Best Fit, honoured this example by comparing its themes to the "Padam Padam" and Tension tracks, which share similar themes throughout.

Other music critics cited various inspirations and elements for the track. According to Neil Z. Yeung of AllMusic, the song "pops through woozy production as a hypnotic groove throbs beneath the surface", while Pitchfork writer Harry Tafoya found the track's vibe to be "silly", with Minogue "vamping through pounding piano house to deliver some truly ridiculous lyrics." George Griffiths of the Official Charts Company describes "Padam Padam" as "elastic, Eastern Europe-inspired electro-pop with a bite", and Quentin Harrison of Albumism also notices Eastern-European sounds. When it appeared on Tension, Vera Maksymiuk of Riff wrote that it "sets the tone; mimicking a heartbeat". Guy Oddy of The Arts Desk observed that it was slightly influenced by 1990s music, particularly house and electro music and that the song features a "sensual groove, fruity lyrics, and slightly autotuned vocals". "I heard the demo and loved it. 'This is amazing'. And then once I'd self-recorded my vocals and put them in, I though 'What's more, this is amazing for me.' I really felt like I was fused to this song, and we became greater than the sum of our parts," Minogue talked about hearing "Padam Padam" for the first time.

== Release ==
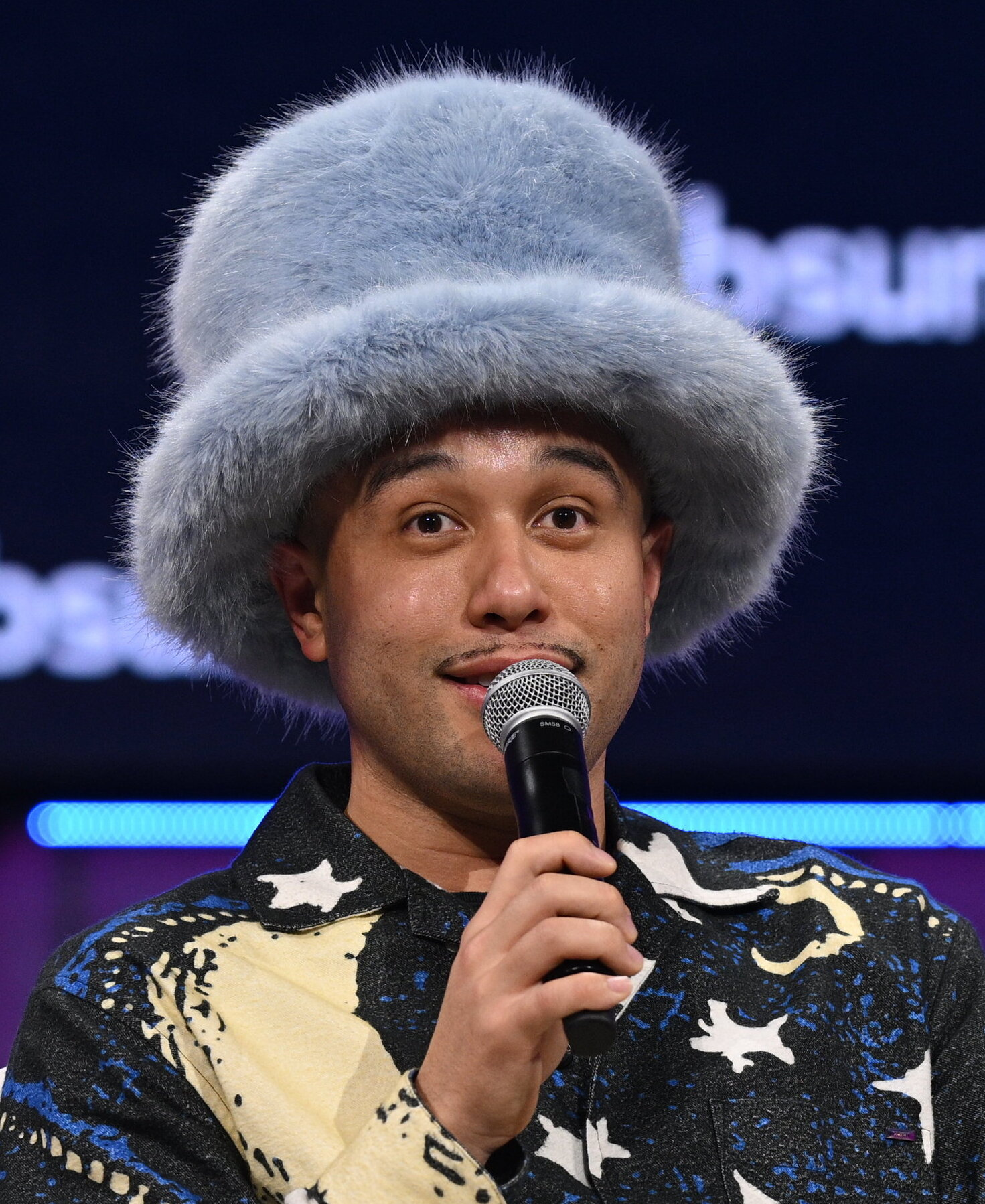
Three official remixes of "Padam Padam" were released, including a remix by Jax Jones (pictured in 2023).

"Padam Padam" was digitally released as the lead single for Tension on 18 May 2023. The single's cover artwork by Studio Moross features Minogue's thigh-high boots against a red-orange desert backdrop. The four-minute extended mix of the song was released digitally on 25 May. It was subsequently included across all physical releases: the CD single and cassette tape in June, and the 7" vinyl that followed in December. That same month, the extended mix appeared on Minogue's 2023 remix album, Extension: The Extended Mixes. Remixes by Jax Jones, HAAi, and Absolute were released individually on streaming platforms in July 2023. These official remixes were included in a cassette single, dubbed "The Mixtape", in August.

Upon its release, "Padam Padam" experienced a surge in popularity on social media. Its unusual hook spawned viral memes on Twitter and Instagram, alongside thousands of dance, lip-sync, and remix videos on TikTok. By June, the hashtag "padampadam" had garnered over ten million views on TikTok, with artists like Olly Alexander and Jade Thirlwall participating in the trend. Despite its popularity, BBC Radio 1 initially declined to playlist the track, drawing ageism accusations and fan petitions. In response, the station claimed age was never a factor and added "Padam Padam" to its C-List, marking Minogue's first Radio 1 playlisting since 2010's "Get Outta My Way". Journalists saw the move as a shift in youth-oriented radio's role from hitmaker to amplifier. Lostboy admitted it felt like "an insult" given that songs with far less cultural impact easily made the station's A-List. (Note: BBC Radio curates a selection of approximately 50 songs for daytime rotation with varying frequencies. Radio 1 is focused on a young audience with a high proportion of new and UK music. A-List tracks receive over 20 plays per week, whereas C-List songs get around six.)

== Critical reception ==
“Padam Padam” garnered critical acclaim from music critics. Padam Padam" was described by Stereogum as "a sleek, thumping, catchy-as-hell dance-pop jam" upon its release, adding that "Kylie knows exactly how to deliver a song like that". Retropop called the song "infectious" and "a punchy electronic extravaganza that promises to be 'in your head all weekend'". NME editor Hollie Geraghty praised the song's "thumping earworm refrain", while Jon Stickler of Stereoboard described it as "the catchy pop banger" with a "infectious chorus." Mary Varvaris of The Music wrote that the song "sounds completely 2023 while remaining unmistakably Kylie". The song was described as a "shiny bubble of dance-pop joy" by Owen Myers of The Guardian, "unburdened by its performer's personal narrative, freeing Minogue up to play sunny showgirl once more." According to David Smyth of The Evening Standard, "Padam Padam" is a "slinky, Eurovision-style firecracker catchy enough to cause sleepless nights".

Its inclusion in Tension drew widespread praise. Noting it as Minogue's "catchiest chorus in decades", Yeung of AllMusic it as one of the album's top picks and career highlights, saying "listeners won't soon be able to get "Padam Padam" out of their heads." Similarly, Harrison of Albumism chose it as one of the standout tracks from Tension. Peter Piatkowski wrote for PopMatters that selecting "Padam Padam" as the lead single "was a smart decision by whoever made that call". He also compared it to Minogue's single "Can't Get You Out of My Head," stating that "Padam Padam" is "just the kind of ear-worm pop hit that "Can't Get You Out of My Head" was", noting its catchiness. Michael Cragg of Crack dubbed it her best lead single since "Slow", describing it as "hot, heavy, and primarily controlled by Kylie's deepest desires." NME writer Nick Levine called the track "brilliant" and thought it was an "outlier" to Tension. Guy Oddy of The Arts Desk described it as an "absolute banger and has been touted as one of her best tunes in years - with good reason."

Jeremy Allen, writing for The Quietus, identified key elements to the success of "Padam Padam", including "red herring, borrowed judiciously and tethered to some icy electro in a minor key, adorned with subtle musical arabesques", and how those qualities worked for her with her singles "Confide in Me" in 1994 and "Can't Get You Out of My Head" while "keeping things fresh by always being adventurous." Helen Brown of The Independent called the track an "Advance slam-dunker", while Devon Chodzin of Paste saw it as the album's "glimmering thesis statement—a bouncy cut under three minutes that recounts a sultry dance floor encounter and the possibilities it presents." Despite its lack of personal depth, Harry Tafoya of Pitchfork praised its "charm" and called it one of the album's "camp highs", while Loud and Quiet writer Orla Foster thought the song was about "jumpstarting the pulse of your nightclub conquest." According to Alexa Camp of Slant Magazine, "Padam Padam" is "an invasive earworm that feels like it could be a cover of a Reagan-era pop hit".

== Accolades ==
Since its release, "Padam Padam" has received numerous awards and nominations. It was named Record of the Year at the Las Culturistas Culture Awards. At the 2023 ARIA Music Awards, Minogue and "Padam Padam" won Best Pop Release and were nominated for three other awards: Best Solo Artist, Best Independent Release, and Song of the Year, with the latter decided by public vote. Minogue has received the most nominations since the 16th Annual Awards in 2002 in 2002, where she was nominated seven times. At the IHeartRadio Music Awards, she and "Padam Padam" were nominated for Dance Artist and Dance Song of the Year. At the 66th Annual Grammy Awards, the song received the inaugural Grammy Award for Best Pop Dance Recording. It was her first Grammy nomination since "I Believe in You" for Best Dance Recording in 2006, her first since 2009, and her first win since "Come Into My World" in 2004. It also received Anthem of the Year at the 2024 Queerties Awards. "Padam Padam" has also been nominated for Dance Song of the Year at the 2024 iHeartRadio Music Awards and Best Song at the 2024 Global Awards.

Critics' rankings
Publication	List	Rank	Ref.
American Songwriter	Top 12 Songs of 2023	4	
BBC News	The Best Songs of 2023	3	
Billboard	The 100 Best Songs of 2023	41	
Billboard	The 30 Best Dance Tracks of 2023	–	
Consequence	The 200 Best Songs of 2023	88	
Entertainment Weekly	The 10 Best Songs of 2023	4	
Exclaim!	Exclaim's 25 Best Songs of 2023	17	
The Guardian	The 20 Best Songs of 2023	4	
Los Angeles Times	The 100 Best Songs of 2023	–	
The New York Times	Jon Pareles's Best Songs of 2023	19	
The New York Times	Jon Caramanica's Best Songs of 2023	12	
NME	The 50 best songs of 2023	3	
Pitchfork	The 100 Best Songs of 2023	41	
Pitchfork	The Best Pop Music of 2023	–	
Rolling Stone	The 100 Best Songs of 2023	20	
Time	The 10 Best Songs of 2023	5	
Time Out	45 Best Pop Songs of the 21st Century	1	
The Washington Post	Best Pop Singles 2023	1	
Variety	The Best Songs of 2023	31	

== Commercial performance ==
"Padam Padam" was a sleeper hit, finding its success through growing traction on social media platforms. On 26 May, it debuted on the UK Singles Chart at number 26, Minogue's highest charting single since "Into the Blue" (2014). It was the week's most downloaded song, topping on both the Single Sales and Singles Download Chart. The single climbed to number 9 on 16 June, becoming Minogue's 35th top 10 entry and her first since "Higher" (2011). This achievement tied her with Cher, Lulu, and Diana Ross as one of only four female solo artists to score UK top 10 singles across five consecutive decades. The following week, "Padam Padam" ultimately peaked at number 8. According to Music Week's Alan Jones, the single sold 1,693 copies on cassette by the end of June, making it the biggest-selling cassette single in a decade. Despite a December release, "Padam Padam" became the year's 18th best-selling vinyl single in the UK. In March 2025, "Padam Padam" became Minogue's fourth platinum single in the region, signifying 600,000 units sold.

The single brought Minogue back to the US Adult Pop (33) and Pop Airplay (32) charts for the first time since the 2000s. In August, it topped the Dance/Mix Show Airplay chart for two weeks, becoming the singer's second number-one single after "Red Blooded Woman" (2004). Minogue also earned her first top 10 entry on the Dance/Electronic Songs chart (7). By October, the song was Minogue's third-biggest streaming song in the US, earning 34.19 million on-demand audio and video streams. It was certified gold by the Recording Industry Association of America for 500,000 units sold. In South America, "Padam Padam" charted in several territories that received airplay from Monitor Latino, including the top ten in Argentina (6), Chile (3), Colombia (7), El Salvador (10), Guatemala (8), and Venezuela (9) on their English-language charts.

Elsewhere, "Padam Padam" topped the International Media Forest chart in Israel, while peaking at number 190 on the Billboard Global 200, which ranks the top songs globally. It peaked at number 19 in Australia, Minogue's highest-charting entry since "Timebomb" (2012), and was certified platinum. The track ranked at number 48 on Triple J's Hottest 100 of 2023, Australia's annual music countdown. It helped Minogue break Slipknot's record for the longest gap between two chart appearances, spanning 26 years since her 1997 single, "Did It Again". In New Zealand, the song peaked at number 11 and was certified gold. Across European countries, "Padam Padam" peaked in the top 10 on the national single charts in Hungary (4) and Ireland (7), as well as airplay charts in Croatia (4), Bulgaria (10), and Latvia (10).

== Music video ==
A shot of Minogue in a junkyard wearing a custom Mugler outfit

Directed by British filmmaker Sophie Muller, the music video for "Padam Padam" was shot in April 2023 at the Pink Motel, a former working motel in Sun Valley, Los Angeles. Minogue chose to film on location in the US rather than a studio. Inspired by the work of David Lynch and Nicolas Roeg's The Man Who Fell to Earth (1976), Muller aimed to capture the track's inherent "darkness and unease", describing the visuals as conveying a sense of strangeness. Minogue enjoyed making the video, noting that its "otherworldliness and overload of Padam red" helped amplify the song.

Minogue announced the video by posting a snippet on her Instagram account. It eventually premiered on her YouTube channel on 18 May 2023. The video features Minogue across several urban settings—a roadside motel, diner, and a junkyard. She wears a custom red Mugler catsuit with a sheer cape, surrounded by similarly clad backup dancers. Phoebe Luckhurst of The Australian described her look as a "vampiric femme fatale in a candy-coloured Americana dreamland". Mollie Davis of Good Housekeeping highlighted the video's choreography, describing it as "racy [and] electric." By June, the video had amassed 3.5 million views on YouTube, inspiring various social media homages. The visual also spawned toy adaptations, notably a LEGO remake by LEGO's Vice President of Design, Matthew Ashton, and a 2026 Mattel Barbie doll version of Minogue.

== Live performances ==
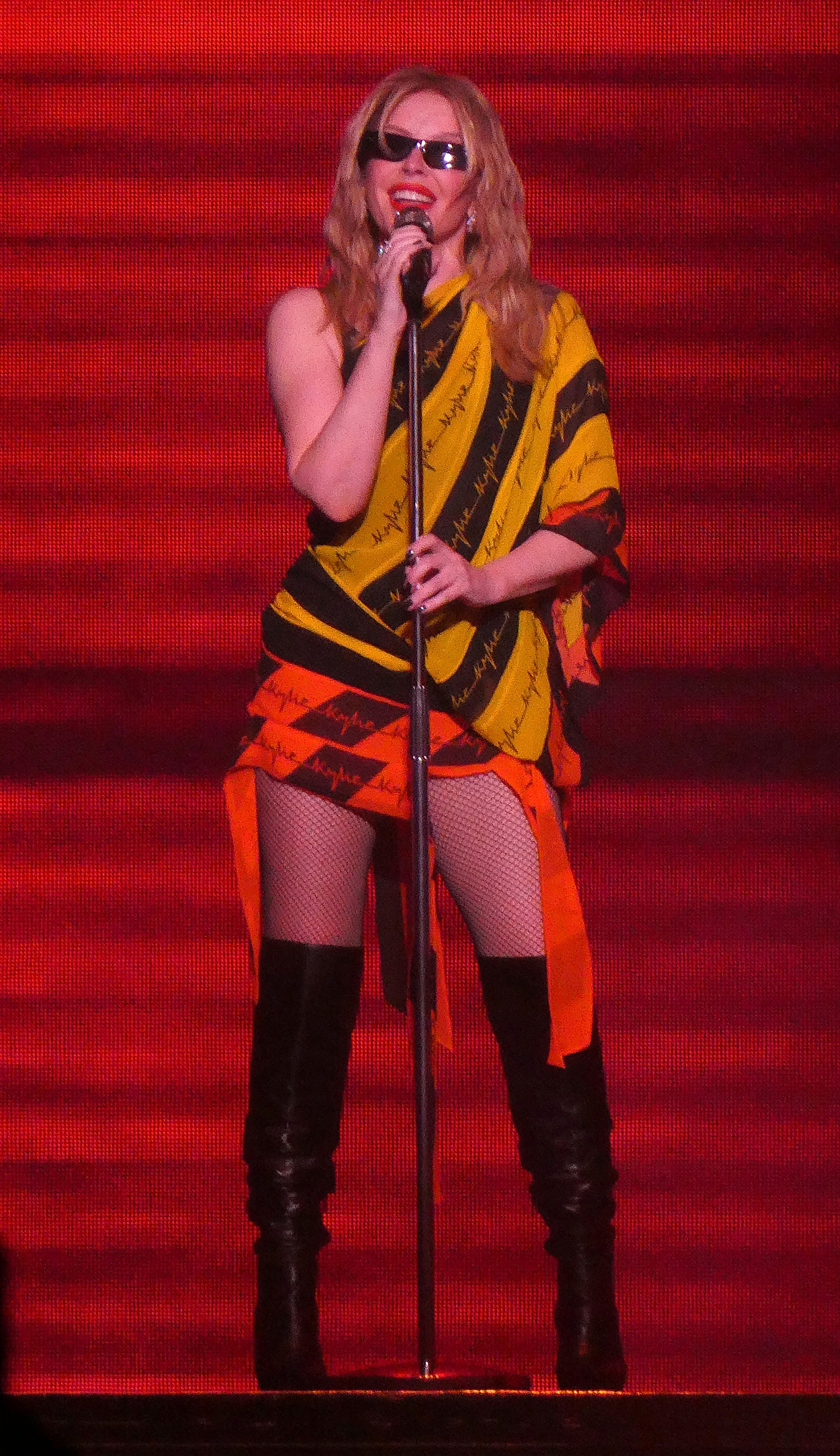
Minogue performing "Padam Padam" on 2025's Tension Tour

Minogue gave the debut live performance of "Padam Padam" at the American Idol season finale on 21 May 2023. In June, she delivered a surprise performance at the Capital Summertime Ball at Wembley Stadium, before promoting the single across major live events in New York, including headlining iHeartMedia's KTUphoria at Jones Beach Theater (June 17), and taking the stage at the gay circuit party Horse Meat Disco (June 23). Ahead of the album's release in September, she returned to London and performed the single during before 35,000 fans at Radio 2 in the Park in Leicester's Victoria Park (17 September), followed by an intimate concert at Shepherd's Bush Empire (27 September)—her first show at the venue in 25 years. Towards the end of 2023, Minogue performed "Padam Padam" at the opening ceremony of the inaugural Las Vegas Grand Prix (15 November), and the British live television series An Audience with... (10 December).

Minogue performed the song at the BST Hyde Park show on 13 July 2024, and received critical acclaim for it. On August 13, "Padam Padam" was included in her performance at the Sziget Festival in Budapest, Hungary.

"Padam Padam" was included among the closing numbers of Minogue's debut concert residency, More Than Just a Residency (2023–2024), at The Venetian Las Vegas, where she performed in an all-white ensemble referencing her Fever era. The song was included on the set list of Minogue's 2025, Tension Tour.

== Impact and cultural significance ==
It's taken on a life of its own, and I am having the time of my life seeing what people are doing, people are hilarious. It's become a noun, a verb, an adjective. You know, friends leaving going: ‘Padam!' Like they've turned into minions or something."

— Minogue's reaction to "Padam Padam"'s success.

Since its release, "Padam Padam" has been regarded as a cultural revelation in Minogue's career and current popular culture. Griffiths of the Official Charts Company coined the term "Padam-ic," which was later used by Laura Snapes of The Guardian to encapsulate the cultural impact of "Padam Padam", describing it as the "cultural moment in which frivolity and lightness seem to be breezing back after the COVID-19 pandemic and after an era in which culture has been taken very seriously". According to Yeung of AllMusic, the song was a "surprise smash" and part of "this mainstream resurgence that once again connected her to a new generation of fans[...]". When the song became an internet meme, Minogue was interviewed by Attitude, and she responded positively to the phenomenon.

"Padam Padam" has been described as Minogue's biggest hit since music streaming became popular, in the same way that singers Diana Ross, Aretha Franklin, and Dusty Springfield had commercial breakthroughs after unsuccessful career periods. Other critics have pointed out that it is unusual for a middle-aged artist to achieve media success in recent decades. According to Variety, chart analyst and historian James Masterton believes the single's success is significant because Minogue has "bridged a generation gap with a hit record that is reaching out both to her loyal (and ageing) acolytes but also a new generation of music fans," the latter attracted thanks to the TikTok platform, which "contributed to the explosion of Kylie's single; [...] bypassing all traditional media avenues."

"Padam Padam" has also become a gay anthem. David Levesley of GQ wrote an article on how the track became an "unlikely gay anthem" and how the track's title "Padam" influenced the gay community's "catch-all gay communiqué". Similarly, the phrase "Padam" has been recognised as a "gay codeword"; Paul Flynn of the Evening Standard observed it as a "gay codeword for everything and nothing. It is a question, a greeting, an exclamation, an insult, and, in some shady corner of the internet, very probably dubious sex practice by now. One Padam fits all." Furthermore, Karen Tongson, popular culture and gender studies specialist at the University of Southern California, noted its positive significance in comparison to the violence against LGBTQ people in the United States through 2023, saying, "There's something about the release of "Padam Padam" that coincided with this sort of moment of despair and conflict, and that reminded us of the kind of intensity, lightness, and kind of queer joy, the celebratory nature of queerness." "Padam Padam" has also been featured at several pride parades, including the New York Pride March, Pride in London, EuroPride 2023 in Malta, and the Sydney Gay and Lesbian Mardi Gras. The song was also used by William, Prince of Wales, and Catherine, Princess of Wales, to announce their participation in London Pride. Similarly, American pop singer Ariana Grande marked her support of the 2023 London Pride celebrations with a social media video of herself lip syncing to the song. Kamala Harris, then Vice President of the United States, posted a video on Instagram of herself dancing to the song at a Pride event at the Stonewall Inn in July 2023.

"Padam Padam" was featured as a lip-sync song on the sixteenth season of the American reality competition series RuPaul's Drag Race. The track was used in the final episode as a lip-sync battle between contestants Nymphia Wind and Sapphira Cristál, with the former winning both the lip-sync and overall competition.

== Credits and personnel ==
Credits adapted from the liner notes of Tension.

Locations

- Recorded at Neverland, and Infinite Disco Studio in London.

Personnel

- Kylie Minogue – lead vocals, engineering
- Peter Rycroft – writing, production
- Ina Wroldsen – writing
- Guy Massey – mixing
- Dick Beetham – mastering

== Charts ==
=== Weekly charts ===
Weekly chart performance for "Padam Padam"
Chart (2023–2024)	Peak position
Argentina Anglo Airplay (Monitor Latino)	6
Australia (ARIA)	19
Australia Club (ARIA)	12
Australia Independent (AIR)	1
Belgium (Ultratop 50 Flanders)	26
Belarus Airplay (TopHit)	67
Bulgaria Airplay (PROPHON)	10
Canada Hot 100 (Billboard)	98
Canada Hot AC (Billboard)	35
Canada CHR/Top 40 (Billboard)	33
Central America Anglo Airplay (Monitor Latino)	12
Chile Anglo Airplay (Monitor Latino)	3
CIS Airplay (TopHit)	33
Colombia Anglo Airplay (Monitor Latino)	7
Costa Rica Anglo Airplay (Monitor Latino)	11
Croatia International Airplay (Top lista)	4
Denmark Airplay (Hitlisten)	15
Dominican Republic Anglo Airplay (Monitor Latino)	17
El Salvador Anglo Airplay (Monitor Latino)	10
Estonia Airplay (TopHit)	67
Finland Airplay (Radiosoittolista)	78
Germany Download (Official German Charts)	14
Global 200 (Billboard)	190
Guatemala Anglo Airplay (Monitor Latino)	8
Hungary (Dance Top 40)	21
Hungary (Rádiós Top 40)	4
Hungary (Single Top 40)	32
Ireland (IRMA)	7
Israel International Airplay (Media Forest)	1
Kazakhstan Airplay (TopHit)	72
Latvia Airplay (LaIPA)	10
Lithuania Airplay (TopHit)	13
Mexico Anglo Airplay (Monitor Latino)	12
Netherlands (Dutch Top 40)	18
Netherlands (Single Top 100)	40
New Zealand Hot Singles (RMNZ)	11
Peru Anglo Airplay (Monitor Latino)	15
Poland (Polish Airplay Top 100)	11
Romania Airplay (TopHit)	116
Russia Airplay (TopHit)	42
Slovakia Airplay (ČNS IFPI)	39
South Africa Airplay (RISA)	7
Spain Airplay (Promusicae)	39
Sweden (DigiListan)	17
UK Singles (Official Charts)	8
UK Dance (Official Charts)	5
UK Independent (Official Charts)	1
US Digital Song Sales (Billboard)	18
US Adult Pop Airplay (Billboard)	33
US Dance Airplay (Billboard)	1
US Hot Dance/Electronic Songs (Billboard)	7
US Pop Airplay (Billboard)	32
Venezuela Anglo (Monitor Latino)	9
Venezuela (Record Report)	46

=== Monthly charts ===
Monthly chart performance
Chart (2023)	Peak position
Belarus Airplay (TopHit)	69
CIS Airplay (TopHit)	33
Estonia Airplay (TopHit)	36
Kazakhstan Airplay (TopHit)	76
Lithuania Airplay (TopHit)	9
Russia Airplay (TopHit)	42

=== Year-end charts ===
2023 year-end chart performance
Chart (2023)	Position
Australian Artist Singles (ARIA)	22
Belgium (Ultratop 50 Flanders)	98
CIS Airplay (TopHit)	144
Estonia Airplay (TopHit)	80
Hungary (Dance Top 40)	78
Hungary (Rádiós Top 40)	59
Lithuania Airplay (TopHit)	53
Netherlands (Dutch Top 40)	78
UK Vinyl Singles (OCC)	18
US Hot Dance/Electronic Songs (Billboard)	17

== Certifications ==
Certifications and sales for "Padam Padam"
Region	Certification	Certified units/sales
Australia (ARIA)	Platinum	70,000^{‡}
Brazil (Pro-Música Brasil)	Gold	20,000^{‡}
Netherlands (NVPI)	Gold	46,500^{‡}
New Zealand (RMNZ)	Gold	15,000^{‡}
Spain (Promusicae)	Gold	30,000^{‡}
United Kingdom (BPI)	Platinum	600,000^{‡}
United States (RIAA)	Gold	500,000^{‡}
^{‡} Sales+streaming figures based on certification alone.

== Release history ==
Release history and formats for "Padam Padam"
Date	Format	Version	Label
18 May 2023	Digital download; streaming	Original	Darenote; BMG Rights Management
25 May 2023	Digital download	Extended mix	Darenote; BMG Rights Management
2 June 2023	CD single	Original; extended mix	Darenote; BMG Rights Management
15 June 2023	Cassette	Original; extended mix	Darenote; BMG Rights Management
28 June 2023	Digital download	Jax Jones remix	Darenote; BMG Rights Management
30 June 2023	Streaming	Jax Jones remix	Darenote; BMG Rights Management
30 June 2023	Digital download; streaming	Jax Jones extended mix	Darenote; BMG Rights Management
6 July 2023	Digital download; streaming	Absolute. remix (Note: Also dubbed as Absolute. Padam All Weekend remix, and Absolute. Padam All Weekend dub.)	Darenote; BMG Rights Management
21 July 2023	Digital download; streaming	HAAi remix	Darenote; BMG Rights Management
1 August 2023	Cassette	The Mixtape (Note: Contained remixes by Jax Jones, Absolute, and HAAi.)	Darenote; BMG Rights Management
8 December 2023	7" vinyl	Original; extended mix	Darenote; BMG Rights Management

== See also ==
- List of Billboard number-one dance songs of 2023
- List of UK Singles Downloads Chart number ones of the 2020s
- List of UK Singles Sales Chart number ones
- Radio 1 Madonna controversy
