= List of European number-one hits of 2001 =

This is a list of the European Music & Media magazine's European Hot 100 Singles and European Top 100 Albums number-ones of 2001.

Issue date	Song	Artist	Album	Artist
6 January	"Stan"	Eminem featuring Dido	1	The Beatles
13 January	"Stan"	Eminem featuring Dido	1	The Beatles
20 January	"Stan"	Eminem featuring Dido	1	The Beatles
27 January	"Stan"	Eminem featuring Dido	1	The Beatles
3 February	"Stan"	Eminem featuring Dido	1	The Beatles
10 February	"Stan"	Eminem featuring Dido	J.Lo	Jennifer Lopez
17 February	"Stan"	Eminem featuring Dido	J.Lo	Jennifer Lopez
24 February	"Stan"	Eminem featuring Dido	No Angel	Dido
3 March	"Ms. Jackson"	OutKast	No Angel	Dido
10 March	"Ms. Jackson"	OutKast	No Angel	Dido
17 March	"Ms. Jackson"	OutKast	No Angel	Dido
24 March	"Ms. Jackson"	OutKast	No Angel	Dido
31 March	"It Wasn't Me"	Shaggy featuring Ricardo "RikRok" Ducent	No Angel	Dido
7 April	"It Wasn't Me"	Shaggy featuring Ricardo "RikRok" Ducent	No Angel	Dido
14 April	"It Wasn't Me"	Shaggy featuring Ricardo "RikRok" Ducent	No Angel	Dido
21 April	"It Wasn't Me"	Shaggy featuring Ricardo "RikRok" Ducent	No Angel	Dido
28 April	"It Wasn't Me"	Shaggy featuring Ricardo "RikRok" Ducent	No Angel	Dido
5 May	"It Wasn't Me"	Shaggy featuring Ricardo "RikRok" Ducent	No Angel	Dido
12 May	"It Wasn't Me"	Shaggy featuring Ricardo "RikRok" Ducent	No Angel	Dido
19 May	"It Wasn't Me"	Shaggy featuring Ricardo "RikRok" Ducent	Survivor	Destiny's Child
26 May	"It Wasn't Me"	Shaggy featuring Ricardo "RikRok" Ducent	Survivor	Destiny's Child
2 June	"It Wasn't Me"	Shaggy featuring Ricardo "RikRok" Ducent	Reveal	R.E.M.
9 June	"Whole Again"	Atomic Kitten	Reveal	R.E.M.
16 June	"Angel"	Shaggy featuring Rayvon	Reveal	R.E.M.
23 June	"Angel"	Shaggy featuring Rayvon	Amnesiac	Radiohead
30 June	"Angel"	Shaggy featuring Rayvon	Proxima Estacion: Esperanza	Manu Chao
7 July	"Angel"	Shaggy featuring Rayvon	Proxima Estacion: Esperanza	Manu Chao
14 July	"Lady Marmalade"	Christina Aguilera, Lil' Kim, Mýa & Pink	Proxima Estacion: Esperanza	Manu Chao
21 July	"Lady Marmalade"	Christina Aguilera, Lil' Kim, Mýa & Pink	Hot Shot	Shaggy
28 July	"Angel"	Shaggy featuring Rayvon	Proxima Estacion: Esperanza	Manu Chao
4 August	"Angel"	Shaggy featuring Rayvon	Hot Shot	Shaggy
11 August	"Lady Marmalade"	Christina Aguilera, Lil' Kim, Mya & Pink	Hot Shot	Shaggy
18 August	"Lady Marmalade"	Christina Aguilera, Lil' Kim, Mya & Pink	Proxima Estacion: Esperanza	Manu Chao
25 August	"Lady Marmalade"	Christina Aguilera, Lil' Kim, Mya & Pink	Proxima Estacion: Esperanza	Manu Chao
1 September	"Lady Marmalade"	Christina Aguilera, Lil' Kim, Mya & Pink	Gorillaz	Gorillaz
8 September	"Lady Marmalade"	Christina Aguilera, Lil' Kim, Mya & Pink	Proxima Estacion: Esperanza	Manu Chao
15 September	"Let Me Blow Ya Mind"	Eve featuring Gwen Stefani	Vespertine	Björk
22 September	"Let Me Blow Ya Mind"	Eve featuring Gwen Stefani	A Funk Odyssey	Jamiroquai
29 September	"Let Me Blow Ya Mind"	Eve featuring Gwen Stefani	A Funk Odyssey	Jamiroquai
6 October	"Can't Get You Out of My Head"	Kylie Minogue	A Funk Odyssey	Jamiroquai
13 October	"Can't Get You Out of My Head"	Kylie Minogue	A Funk Odyssey	Jamiroquai
20 October	"Can't Get You Out of My Head"	Kylie Minogue	Collection	Tracy Chapman
27 October	"Can't Get You Out of My Head"	Kylie Minogue	Fever	Kylie Minogue
3 November	"Can't Get You Out of My Head"	Kylie Minogue	Fever	Kylie Minogue
10 November	"Can't Get You Out of My Head"	Kylie Minogue	Fever	Kylie Minogue
17 November	"Can't Get You Out of My Head"	Kylie Minogue	Invincible	Michael Jackson
24 November	"Can't Get You Out of My Head"	Kylie Minogue	Invincible	Michael Jackson
1 December	"Can't Get You Out of My Head"	Kylie Minogue	Echoes: The Best of Pink Floyd	Pink Floyd
8 December	"Can't Get You Out of My Head"	Kylie Minogue	Swing When You're Winning	Robbie Williams
15 December	"Can't Get You Out of My Head"	Kylie Minogue	Swing When You're Winning	Robbie Williams
22 December	"Can't Get You Out of My Head"	Kylie Minogue	Swing When You're Winning	Robbie Williams
29 December	"Can't Get You Out of My Head"	Kylie Minogue	Swing When You're Winning	Robbie Williams

== See also ==
- 2001 in music
- List of number-one hits in Europe
