= List of awards and nominations received by Kylie Minogue =

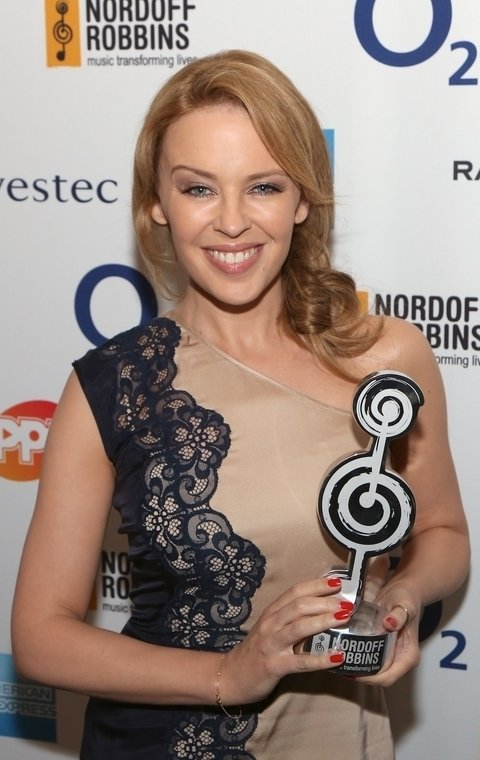
- Minogue with the 25th Anniversary O2 Silver Clef Award in June 2012
Awards and nominations
Award	Wins	Nominations
ARIA Music Awards	18	54
Australian Entertainment "Mo Awards"	6	6
Brit Awards	4	13
Grammy Awards	2	6
Japan Gold Disc Award	2	2
Logie Awards	6	8
MTV Europe Music Awards	3	7
MTV Video Music Awards	2	4
Phonographic Performance Company of Australia	22	22
Silver Clef Award	2	2
Smash Hits Readers' Poll	64	66
Top of the Pops Awards	3	4

Totals (Note: Certain award groups do not simply award one winner. They acknowledge several different recipients, have runners-up, and have third place. Since this is a specific recognition and is different from losing an award, runner-up mentions are considered wins in this award tally. For simplification and to avoid errors, each award in this list has been presumed to have had a prior nomination.)
- Wins: 231
- Nominations: 316

Kylie Minogue is an Australian singer and actress. In 1987, she received a Silver Logie Award for Most Popular Actress for her breakthrough role in the soap opera Neighbours (1986–1988) as Charlene Robinson. At the following ceremony, she became the first person to win four Logie Awards at one event and the youngest Gold Logie recipient at nineteen. Interested in pursuing a career in music, Minogue signed to Mushroom Records in 1987 and released her self-titled debut album, Kylie, in 1988. Her songs—a cover of "The Loco-Motion" and "I Should Be So Lucky"—consecutively won the award for Highest Selling Single at the ARIA Music Awards of 1988 and 1989. Minogue's contributions to the subsequent studio albums Enjoy Yourself (1989), Let's Get to It (1991), Kylie Minogue (1994), and Impossible Princess (1997) earned her four nominations for the ARIA Award for Best Female Artist.

In 1996, her duet with rock band Nick Cave and the Bad Seeds, "Where the Wild Roses Grow", won three ARIA Awards for Best Pop Release, Single of the Year, and Song of the Year. Minogue signed to Parlophone in 1999 and released Light Years the following year, which was nominated for the ARIA Award for Album of the Year. Her eighth studio Fever (2001) was a commercial and critical success, winning her first Brit Award for International Album in 2002. Its lead single, "Can't Get You Out of My Head", garnered accolades for Single of the Year at the 16th ARIA Music Awards and the 2002 Edison Award. Two other singles from Fever, "Love at First Sight" and "Come into My World", were nominated for the Grammy Award for Best Dance Recording, the latter winning in 2004—the first time an Australian music artist had won in a major category since Men at Work in 1983.

For her work as songwriter for "Slow" from Body Language (2003), Minogue received two nominations for Ivor Novello Awards for "Best Contemporary Song" and "International Hit of the Year". (Note: The awards seek to recognise the best British composers and songwriters. Minogue, however, was not credited as a songwriter for "I Should Be So Lucky", "Can't Get You Out of My Head", and "All The Lovers"—all of which received nominations in 1989, 2002, and 2011, respectively.) X (2007) was Minogue's first Grammy nomination in the Best Dance/Electronic Album category, her fifth overall. Minogue signed with BMG Rights Management in 2018 and released her fifteenth studio album, Disco (2020), which garnered nominations for Billboard Music Award for Top Dance/Electronic Album, ARIA Awards for Best Adult Contemporary Album and Best Artist. For "Padam Padam", the lead single from Tension (2023), Minogue won the ARIA Award for Best Pop Release, as well as the inaugural Grammy Award for Best Dance Pop Recording.

Minogue received the Special Achievement Award in 1989, and two more Outstanding Achievement Awards in 1990 and 2002 by Australian Recording Industry Association, who also inducted her into the ARIA Hall of Fame in 2011. She received the JC Williamson Award in 2013 for contributing to Australian live entertainment. In the United Kingdom, she has achieved eight number-one albums for five consecutive decades, earning Minogue an entry in the 2020 Guinness World Records. She received an honorary Doctor of Health Science degree from Anglia Ruskin University in 2011 for her work in raising awareness for breast cancer. She was appointed an Officer of the Order of the British Empire (OBE) in the 2008 New Year Honours for music services. For her contribution to the enrichment of French culture, the French government appointed her as a Chevalier de l'Ordre des Arts et des Lettres, while the Britain-Australia Society recognized Minogue in April 2017 for her contribution to improving relations between Britain and Australia.

== Awards and nominations ==
Key
†	Indicates non-competitive categories

Award (Note: Listicles and charts are not included, unless they are explicitly described as "awards" or specific trophies are given.)	Year (Note: Indicates the year of ceremony. Each year is linked to the article about the awards held that year, wherever possible.)	Category	Recipient(s) and nominee(s)	Result	Ref.
American Choreography Awards	2004	Outstanding Achievement in Choreography – Music Video	Michael Rooney for "Chocolate"	Nominated	
APRA Awards	2021	Song of The Year	"Say Something"	Shortlisted	
APRA Awards	2024	Song of The Year	"Hold On to Now"	Shortlisted	
APRA Awards	2025	Ted Albert Award	Kylie Minogue	Won	
ARIA Music Awards	1988	Highest Selling Single	"Locomotion"	Won	
ARIA Music Awards	1989	Highest Selling Single	"I Should Be So Lucky"	Won	
ARIA Music Awards	1989	Best Female Artist	Kylie	Nominated	
ARIA Music Awards	1989	Highest Selling Album	Kylie	Nominated	
ARIA Music Awards	1989	Breakthrough Artist – Album	Kylie	Nominated	
ARIA Music Awards	1989	Special Achievement Award †	Kylie Minogue	Won	
ARIA Music Awards	1990	Outstanding Achievement Award †	Kylie Minogue	Won	
ARIA Music Awards	1990	Best Female Artist	Enjoy Yourself	Nominated	
ARIA Music Awards	1992	Best Female Artist	Let's Get to It	Nominated	
ARIA Music Awards	1995	Best Female Artist	Kylie Minogue	Nominated	
ARIA Music Awards	1995	Best Video	"Put Yourself In My Place"	Won	
ARIA Music Awards	1995	Highest Selling Single	"Confide In Me"	Nominated	
ARIA Music Awards	1996	Best Pop Release	"Where the Wild Roses Grow" (with Nick Cave and the Bad Seeds)	Won	
ARIA Music Awards	1996	Single of the Year	"Where the Wild Roses Grow" (with Nick Cave and the Bad Seeds)	Won	
ARIA Music Awards	1996	Song of the Year	"Where the Wild Roses Grow" (with Nick Cave and the Bad Seeds)	Won	
ARIA Music Awards	1998	Album of the Year	Impossible Princess	Nominated	
ARIA Music Awards	1998	Best Female Artist	Impossible Princess	Nominated	
ARIA Music Awards	1998	Best Pop Release	Impossible Princess	Nominated	
ARIA Music Awards	1998	Single of the Year	"Did It Again"	Nominated	
ARIA Music Awards	1999	Best Female Artist	"Cowboy Style"	Nominated	
ARIA Music Awards	2000	Best Female Artist	"Spinning Around"	Nominated	
ARIA Music Awards	2000	Best Pop Release	"Spinning Around"	Won	
ARIA Music Awards	2001	Album of the Year	Light Years	Nominated	
ARIA Music Awards	2001	Best Female Artist	Light Years	Won	
ARIA Music Awards	2001	Best Pop Release	Light Years	Won	
ARIA Music Awards	2001	Highest Selling Album	Light Years	Nominated	
ARIA Music Awards	2001	Single of the Year	"On a Night Like This"	Nominated	
ARIA Music Awards	2001	Highest Selling Single	"On a Night Like This"	Nominated	
ARIA Music Awards	2002	Album of the Year	Fever	Nominated	
ARIA Music Awards	2002	Best Female Artist	Fever	Nominated	
ARIA Music Awards	2002	Best Pop Release	Fever	Won	
ARIA Music Awards	2002	Highest Selling Album	Fever	Won	
ARIA Music Awards	2002	Highest Selling Single	"Can't Get You Out of My Head"	Won	
ARIA Music Awards	2002	Single of the Year	"Can't Get You Out of My Head"	Won	
ARIA Music Awards	2002	Outstanding Achievement Award †	Kylie Minogue	Won	
ARIA Music Awards	2003	Best Female Artist	"Come into My World"	Nominated	
ARIA Music Awards	2003	Best Pop Release	"Come into My World"	Nominated	
ARIA Music Awards	2004	Best Female Artist	Body Language	Nominated	
ARIA Music Awards	2004	Best Pop Release	Body Language	Nominated	
ARIA Music Awards	2005	Best Female Artist	"I Believe in You"	Nominated	
ARIA Music Awards	2005	Best Pop Release	"I Believe in You"	Nominated	
ARIA Music Awards	2006	Best Music DVD	Kylie: Showgirl	Nominated	
ARIA Music Awards	2008	Best Female Artist	X	Nominated	
ARIA Music Awards	2008	Best Pop Release	X	Nominated	
ARIA Music Awards	2010	Best Female Artist	Aphrodite	Nominated	
ARIA Music Awards	2010	Best Pop Release	Aphrodite	Nominated	
ARIA Music Awards	2011	ARIA Hall of Fame Inductees †	Kylie Minogue	Inducted	
ARIA Music Awards	2021	Best Artist	Disco	Nominated	
ARIA Music Awards	2021	Best Adult Contemporary Album	Disco	Nominated	
ARIA Music Awards	2023	Best Artist	"Padam Padam"	Nominated	
ARIA Music Awards	2023	Best Song	"Padam Padam"	Nominated	
ARIA Music Awards	2023	Best Pop Release	"Padam Padam"	Won	
ARIA Music Awards	2023	Best Independent Release	"Padam Padam"	Nominated	
ARIA Music Awards	2024	Best Artist	Tension	Nominated	
ARIA Music Awards	2024	Album of the Year	Tension	Nominated	
ARIA Music Awards	2024	Best Pop Release	Tension	Nominated	
ARIA Music Awards	2024	Best Independent Release	Tension	Nominated	
ARIA Music Awards	2024	Song of the Year	"Tension"	Nominated	
ARIA Music Awards	2025	Best Artist	Tension II	Nominated	
ARIA Music Awards	2025	Best Pop Release	Tension II	Nominated	
ARIA Music Awards	2025	Best Live Act	Tension Tour	Nominated	
ARIA Music Awards	2026	Best Pop Release	Tension Tour Live	Nominated	
Australian Commercial Radio Awards	2003	Most Played Australian Artist	Kylie Minogue	Won	
Australia Day Foundation	2015	Australian of the Year in the UK	Kylie Minogue	Won	
Australian Entertainment "Mo" Awards	1990	International Showbusiness Ambassador	Kylie Minogue	Won	
Australian Entertainment "Mo" Awards	2001	Australian Performer of the Year	Kylie Minogue	Won	
Australian Entertainment "Mo" Awards	2002	Australian Performer of the Year	Kylie Minogue	Won	
Australian Entertainment "Mo" Awards	2002	Australian Showbusiness Ambassador of the Year	Kylie Minogue	Won	
Australian Entertainment "Mo" Awards	2003	Australian Showbusiness Ambassador of the Year	Kylie Minogue	Won	
Australian Entertainment "Mo" Awards	2003	Australian Performer of the Year	Kylie Minogue	Won	
Bambi Award	2001	Best Comeback	Kylie Minogue	Won	
Billboard Music Awards	2021	Top Dance/Electronic Album	Disco	Nominated	
Billboard Women in Music Award	2024	Icon Award †	Kylie Minogue	Won	
Bravo Otto	1988	Female Singer	Kylie Minogue	Bronze	
Bravo Otto	1989	Female Singer	Kylie Minogue	Bronze	
Bravo Otto	2001	Female Singer	Kylie Minogue	Gold	
Bravo Otto	2003	Honorary Otto †	Kylie Minogue	Won	
Brit Awards	1989	Best International Female	Kylie Minogue	Nominated	
Brit Awards	1995	Best International Female	Kylie Minogue	Nominated	
Brit Awards	2001	Best International Female	Kylie Minogue	Nominated	
Brit Awards	2002	Best British Video	"Kids" (with Robbie Williams)	Nominated	
Brit Awards	2002	Best International Album	Fever	Won	
Brit Awards	2002	Best International Female	Kylie Minogue	Won	
Brit Awards	2002	Best Pop Act	Kylie Minogue	Nominated	
Brit Awards	2004	Best International Female	Kylie Minogue	Nominated	
Brit Awards	2005	International Female Solo Artist	Kylie Minogue	Nominated	
Brit Awards	2008	Best International Album	X	Nominated	
Brit Awards	2008	International Female Solo Artist	Kylie Minogue	Won	
Brit Awards	2010	Brits Performance of 30 Years	"Can't Get You Out of My Head"	Nominated	
Brit Awards	2011	International Female Solo Artist	Kylie Minogue	Nominated	
Brit Awards	2024	Global Icon †	Kylie Minogue	Won	
Brit Awards	2024	International Artist	Kylie Minogue	Nominated	
British LGBT Awards	2015	Global Icon †	Kylie Minogue	Won	
The Brit Trust	2007	Music Industry Trusts Award †	Kylie Minogue	Won	
BT Digital Music Awards	2008	Artist of the Year	Kylie Minogue	Nominated	
BT Digital Music Awards	2008	Best Pop Artist	Kylie Minogue	Won	
BT Digital Music Awards	2008	Best Innovation or Gadget	Kyliekonnect.com	Won	
BT Digital Music Awards	2010	Best Official Web Site	Kylie.com	13th place	
Capital FM Awards	2002	Best International Female	Kylie Minogue	Won	
Capital FM Awards	2002	Best International Single	"Can't Get You Out of My Head"	Won	
Capital Gold Legends Awards	2003	Kylie Minogue	New Legend	Nominated	
Classic Pop Reader Awards	2019	Solo Artist of the Year	Kylie Minogue	2nd place	
Classic Pop Reader Awards	2019	Live Act of the Year	Kylie Minogue	Nominated	
Classic Pop Reader Awards	2019	Album of the Year	Golden	Won	
Classic Pop Reader Awards	2019	Single of the Year	"Dancing"	2nd place	
Classic Pop Reader Awards	2019	Video of the Year	"Dancing"	2nd place	
Clive James on the 80s	1989	Woman of the Decade †	Kylie Minogue	Won	
DanceStar Awards	2002	UK – Best Chart Act	"Can't Get You Out of My Head"	Won	
DanceStar Awards	2002	UK – MTV Dance Best Video	"Can't Get You Out of My Head"	Nominated	
DanceStar Awards	2003	US – Record of the Year	"Can't Get You Out of My Head"	Nominated	
DanceStar Awards	2003	US – Best International Act	Kylie Minogue	Nominated	
DanceStar Awards	2003	US – Party 93.1 FM Best Remix Award	"Come into My World" (Fischerspooner Remix)	Won	
DanceStar Awards	2003	US – Best Video	"Love at First Sight"	Nominated	
DanceStar Awards	2004	US – Best Video	"Slow"	Nominated	
Digital Cinema Media	2009	Best Cinema Commercial of All Time	"Proof" (2001) for Agent Provocateur	Won	
The Drinks Business	2020	Global Chardonnay Masters	Kylie Minogue Chardonnay – Margaret River	Gold	
The Drinks Business	2021	Marketing Awards	Benchmark Drinks for Kylie Minogue Wines	Spl. commendation	
Echo Arena Liverpool	2014	Icon Award †	Kylie Minogue	Won	
Echo Music Prize	2002	Best International Rock/Pop Female Artist	Fever	Nominated	
Echo Music Prize	2002	International Single of the Year	"Can't Get You Out of My Head"	Nominated	
Edison Award	2002	Single of the Year	"Can't Get You Out of My Head"	Won	
Electronic Dance Music Awards	2024	Music Video of the Year	"Padam Padam"	Nominated	
Electronic Dance Music Awards	2024	Dance Radio Song of the Year	"Padam Padam"	Nominated	
Elle Style Awards	1997	Most Stylish Female Pop Star	Kylie Minogue	Won	
Elle Style Awards	2002	Woman of the Year	Kylie Minogue	Won	
Elle Style Awards	2005	Lifetime Achievement Award †	Kylie Minogue	Won	
Elle Style Awards	2008	Woman of the Year	Kylie Minogue	Won	
Entertainment Industry Foundation Women's Cancer Research Fund	2013	Courage Award †	Kylie Minogue	Won	
GAFFA Awards	2021	Best International Solo Act	Kylie Minogue	Shortlisted	
GAFFA Awards	2021	Best International Album	Disco	Shortlisted	
Gaygalan Awards	2002	International Song of the Year	"Can't Get You Out of My Head"	Won	
Gay Times Readers' Awards	2008	Kylie Minogue	All-Time Female Icon	Gold	
Glamour Awards	2007	Best-dressed Female of the Year	Kylie Minogue	Won	
Glamour Awards	2009	Entrepreneur of the Year	Kylie Minogue	Won	
Glamour Awards	2009	Woman of the Year	Kylie Minogue	Won	
Glamour Awards	2012	Outstanding Contribution	Kylie Minogue	Won	
Glamour Awards	2021	Gamechanging Icon	Kylie Minogue	Won	
Global Awards	2024	Best Song	"Padam Padam"	Nominated	
Grammy Awards	2003	Best Dance Recording	"Love at First Sight"	Nominated	
Grammy Awards	2004	Best Dance Recording	"Come into My World"	Won	
Grammy Awards	2005	Best Dance Recording	"Slow"	Nominated	
Grammy Awards	2006	Best Dance Recording	"I Believe In You"	Nominated	
Grammy Awards	2009	Best Electronic/Dance Album	X	Nominated	
Grammy Awards	2024	Best Pop Dance Recording	"Padam Padam"	Won	
Golden Wine Awards (Note: The Golden Vines Awards recognizes the leading members of the wine industry and raises funds for the Gérard Basset Foundation, which was founded by family and colleagues of French wine professional Gérard Basset.)	2021	The Liquid Icons Special Award for Wine Entrepreneurialism †	Kylie Minogue	Won	
Goldene Kamera	2008	Best International Music Act	Kylie Minogue	Won	
GQ Men of the Year Awards	2001	Services to Mankind	Kylie Minogue	Won	
GQ Men of the Year Awards	2013	Gentlewoman of the Year	Kylie Minogue	Won	
GQ Men of the Year Awards	2019	Icon Award †	Kylie Minogue	Won	
Guinness World Records	2010	Most Consecutive Decades with Top Five Albums (UK) (Female) (Note: Minogue was recognized by the Guinness World Records when her eleventh studio album, Aphrodite (2010), became her ninth top-five entry in four different decades in the United Kingdom—the most for any female artist. She extended her record when Disco debuted atop of the UK Albums Chart in 2020, became her eleventh entry.) †	Kylie Minogue	Won	
Guinness World Records	2020	Most Consecutive Decades with a No.1 on the UK Albums Chart (Female) †	Kylie Minogue	Won	
G'Day USA: Australia Week	2008	Special Honour for Excellence in Promoting Australia in the US †	Kylie Minogue	Won	
Harper's Bazaar Awards	2018	Music Icon Award †	Kylie Minogue	Won	
Helpmann Awards	2009	Best Australian Contemporary Concert	Frontier Touring Company for KylieX2008	Nominated	
Helpmann Awards	2012	Best Australian Contemporary Concert	Kylie Minogue and Frontier Touring Company for Anti Tour	Nominated	
Helpmann Awards	2012	Best Australian Contemporary Concert	Kylie Minogue and Frontier Touring Company for Aphrodite: Les Folies Tour	Won	
Helpmann Awards	2013	JC Williamson Award †	Kylie Minogue	Won	
Helpmann Awards	2019	Best Australian Contemporary Concert	Kylie Minogue and Frontier Touring Company, Roundhouse Entertainment and Mellen Events for Golden Tour	Nominated	
Hit FM Music Awards (China)	2009	Best China Live Act	Kylie Minogue	Nominated	
Hong Kong Top Sales Music Award	2002	Ten Best Selling Foreign Albums	Fever	Won	
Hungarian Music Awards	2002	Best Foreign Pop Album	Fever	Won	
iHeartRadio Music Awards	2024	Dance Song of the Year	"Padam Padam"	Nominated	
iHeartRadio Music Awards	2024	Dance Artist of the Year	Kylie Minogue	Nominated	
iHeartRadio Music Awards	2025	Dance Artist of the Year	Kylie Minogue	Nominated	
International Dance Music Award	2003	Best Pop Dance Track	"Can't Get You Out of My Head"	Won	
International Dance Music Award	2003	Best Dance Video	"Love at First Sight"	Nominated	
International Dance Music Award	2003	Best Dance Artist Solo	Kylie Minogue	Won	
International Dance Music Award	2011	Best Pop Dance Track	"All The Lovers"	Nominated	
International Dance Music Award	2011	Best Solo Artist	Kylie Minogue	Nominated	
International Dance Music Award	2013	Best Commercial/Pop Dance Track	"Timebomb"	Nominated	
International Laser Display Association	2015	Best Live Stage Show	ER Productions for Kiss Me Once Tour	Won	
Italian Dance Awards	2001	Song of the Year	"Can't Get You Out of My Head"	Won	
Italian Dance Awards	2001	Best Video	"Can't Get You Out of My Head"	Won	
Italian Dance Awards	2001	Best Foreign Dance Artist	Kylie Minogue	Won	
Italian Dance Awards	2002	Best International Dance Act	Kylie Minogue	Won	
Ivor Novello Awards	2003	Most Performed Work	"Love at First Sight"	Nominated	
Ivor Novello Awards	2003	Most Performed Work	"In Your Eyes"	Nominated	
Ivor Novello Awards	2004	Best Contemporary Song	"Slow"	Nominated	
Ivor Novello Awards	2004	International Hit of the Year	"Slow"	Nominated	
J Awards	2023	Double J Artist of the Year	Kylie Minogue	Nominated	
Japan Gold Disc Award	1989	New Artist of the Year	Kylie Minogue	Won	
Japan Gold Disc Award	1989	Single of the Year	"I Should Be So Lucky"	Won	
Juno Award	1988	International Single of the Year	"The Loco-Motion"	Nominated	
Las Culturistas Culture Awards	2023	Record of the Year	"Padam Padam"	Won	
Logie Awards	1987	Most Popular Actress in Australia	Neighbours	Won	
Logie Awards	1988	Most Popular Actress in Australia	Neighbours	Won	
Logie Awards	1988	Most Popular Personality on Australian Television	Neighbours	Won	
Logie Awards	1988	Most Popular Personality on Victorian Television	Neighbours	Won	
Logie Awards	1988	Most Popular Music Video	"The Loco-Motion"	Won	
Logie Awards	1989	Most Popular Personality on Australian Television	Neighbours	Nominated	
Logie Awards	1989	Most Popular Actress in Australia	Neighbours	Nominated	
Logie Awards	1990	Most Popular Music Video	"Never Too Late"	Won	
Los Premios MTV Latinoamérica	2002	Best Pop Artist — International	Kylie Minogue	Nominated	
Millward Brown	2010	Most Powerful Celebrity in Britain	Kylie Minogue	Won	
MTV Asia Awards	2003	Favorite Female Artist	Kylie Minogue	Nominated	
MTV Asia Awards	2003	Favorite Video	"Can't Get You Out of My Head"	Nominated	
MTV Asia Awards	2005	Favorite Female Artist	Kylie Minogue	Nominated	
MTV Asia Awards	2005	Favorite Video	"Red Blooded Woman"	Nominated	
MTV Australia Awards	2005	Best Dressed Video	"Chocolate"	Nominated	
MTV Europe Music Awards	2002	Best Album	Fever	Nominated	
MTV Europe Music Awards	2002	Best Female Artist	Kylie Minogue	Nominated	
MTV Europe Music Awards	2002	Best Pop Act	Kylie Minogue	Won	
MTV Europe Music Awards	2002	Best Dance Act	Kylie Minogue	Won	
MTV Europe Music Awards	2003	Best Female Artist	Kylie Minogue	Nominated	
MTV Europe Music Awards	2003	Best Pop Artist	Kylie Minogue	Nominated	
MTV Europe Music Awards	2023	Best Australian Act	Kylie Minogue	Won	
MTV Europe Music Awards	2024	Best Australian Act	Kylie Minogue	Nominated	
MTV Movie & TV Awards	2002	Best Cameo	Moulin Rouge!	Nominated	
MTV TRL Awards	2003	Close Encounter Award	European Vacation with Kylie Minogue	Nominated	
MTV Video Music Awards	1990	International Viewer's Choice Award – MTV Australia	"Better the Devil You Know"	Nominated	
MTV Video Music Awards	1998	International Viewer's Choice Award – MTV Australia	"Did It Again"	Won	
MTV Video Music Awards	2002	International Viewer's Choice Award – MTV Australia	"Can't Get You Out of My Head"	Nominated	
MTV Video Music Awards	2002	Best Choreography in a Video	"Can't Get You Out of My Head"	Won	
MTV Video Music Awards	2002	Best Dance Video	"Can't Get You Out of My Head"	Nominated	
MTV Video Music Awards Japan	2003	Best Dance Video	"Come into My World"	Nominated	
MTV Video Music Awards Japan	2004	Best Dance Video	"Slow"	Nominated	
MTV Video Music Awards Japan	2006	Best Dance Video	"Sometime Samurai" (with Towa Tei)	Nominated	
MuchMusic Video Awards	2002	Best International Artist Video – Artist	"Can't Get You Out of My Head"	Nominated	
Music Week Awards	1989	Top Album Award	Kylie	Won	
Music Week Awards	1989	Top Indie Distribution Single Award	"I Should Be So Lucky"	Won	
Music Week Awards	1989	Top Music Video Award	Kylie: The Videos	Won	
Music Week Awards	2004	Best Pop Video	"Slow"	Won	
Music Week Awards	2019	PR Campaign	Kylie Minogue and Murray Chalmers PR	Nominated	
Music Week Awards	2019	Artist Marketing Campaign	Kylie Minogue and BMG	Nominated	
Music Week Awards	2020	Catalogue Marketing Campaign	Kylie Minogue and BMG	Won	
Music Week Awards	2021	Digital Marketing Masters	Disco	Won	
Music Week Awards	2021	Artist Marketing Campaign	Kylie Minogue and BMG	Nominated	
Music Week Awards	2021	PR Campaign	Kylie Minogue and Murray Chalmers PR (MCPR)	Nominated	
Music Victoria Awards	2021	Music Victoria Hall of Fame †	Kylie Minogue	Inducted	
National Film and Sound Archive	2011	Sounds of Australia †	"I Should Be So Lucky"	Won	
NewNowNext Awards	2013	Dance Floor Hero Award †	Kylie Minogue	Won	
NME Awards	1995	Most Desirable Human Being	Kylie Minogue	Won	
NME Awards	2002	Best Single	"Can't Get You Out of My Head"	Nominated	
NME Awards	2002	Best Pop Act	Kylie Minogue	Won	
NME Awards	2002	Best Solo Artist	Kylie Minogue	Nominated	
NME Awards	2008	Sexiest Woman	Kylie Minogue	Won	
Now! Awards	2018	Best Now Female	Kylie Minogue	Nominated	
Now! Awards	2018	Song of the Noughties	"Can't Get You Out Of My Head"	Nominated	
NRJ Music Award	2002	Kylie Minogue	International Female Artist of the Year	Nominated	
NRJ Music Award	2003	Kylie Minogue	Best International Female	Nominated	
NRJ Music Award	2003	Best Music Web-Site	Kylie.com	Nominated	
NRJ Music Award	2008	NRJ Award of Honor †	Kylie Minogue	Won	
NRJ Radio Awards (Nordic)	2002	"Can't Get You Out of My Head"	Best International Song	Won	
Óčko Music Awards	2008	"In My Arms"	Foreign Video of the Year	Won	
People's Drink Choice Awards (Note: The People's Drink Choice Awards was created in Manchester in 2017. Wines are assessed in round one by wine consumers, before being judged by professionals.)	2021	Vegan Friendly	Kylie Minogue Signature Rosé 2019 – Benchmark Drinks	Won	
People's Drink Choice Awards	2021	Food Friendly Wines: White For Aromatic & Asian Cuisine	Kylie Minogue Signature Sauvignon Blanc 2018 – Benchmark Drinks	Finalist	
People's Drink Choice Awards	2021	Treat Yourself: White	Kylie Minogue Margaret River Chardonnay 2019 – Benchmark Drinks	Won	
People's Drink Choice Awards	2021	Pass the Crackers	Kylie Minogue Signature Merlot 2019 – Benchmark Drinks	Finalist	
People's Drink Choice Awards	2021	War of the Róses	Kylie Minogue Signature Rosé 2019 – Benchmark Drinks	Finalist	
People's Drink Choice Awards	2022	War of the Róses	Kylie Minogue Côtes De Provence Rosé – Benchmark Drinks	Finalist	
People's Drink Choice Awards	2022	Easy Weekday Fizz	Kylie Minogue Prosecco Rosé – Benchmark Drinks	Bronze	
People's Drink Choice Awards	2023	Mindful Drinking: 7.5% Or Less Alcohol	Kylie Minogue 0% Sparkling Rosé 2022 – Benchmark Drinks	Won	
People's Drink Choice Awards	2023	War of the Róses	Kylie Minogue Wines Côtes de Provence Rosé 2021 – Benchmark Drinks	Won	
People's Drink Choice Awards	2023	Aromatic/Asian Cuisine: Rosé	Kylie Minogue Wines Signature Rosé 2021 – Benchmark Drinks	Bronze	
People's Drink Choice Awards	2023	Treat Yourself: White	Kylie Minogue Chardonnay 2020 – Benchmark Drinks	Bronze	
People's Drink Choice Awards	2023	Treat Yourself: Red	Kylie Minogue Pinot Noir 2020 – Benchmark Drinks	Silver	
People's Drink Choice Awards	2024	Mindful Drinking: 7.5% Or Less Alcohol	Kylie Minogue Wines 0% Sparkling Rosé, NV – Benchmark Drinks	Silver	
People's Drink Choice Awards	2025	Mindful Drinking: Alcohol Free (Abv Less Than 0.5%)	Kylie 0% Sparkling White: Benchmark Drinks	Won	
People's Drink Choice Awards	2025	Mindful Drinking: Alcohol Free (Abv Less Than 0.5%)	Kylie 0% Sparkling Rosé, NV: Benchmark Drinks	Finalist	
People's Drink Choice Awards	2025	Rosé All Day	Kylie Minogue Signature Rosé, 2023: Benchmark Drinks	Bronze	
People's Drink Choice Awards	2025	Rosé All Day	Kylie Minogue Vin de Provence, 2023: Benchmark Drinks	Finalist	
People's Drink Choice Awards	2025	Stylish Buys: Best Packaging And Design	Kylie Minogue Vin de Provence, 2023: Benchmark Drinks	Finalist	
Phonographic Performance Company of Australia	2001	50 Most Broadcast Artists of 2001	Kylie Minogue	7th place	
Phonographic Performance Company of Australia	2001	100 Most Broadcast Recordings of 2001	"Spinning Around"	12th place	
Phonographic Performance Company of Australia	2001	100 Most Broadcast Recordings of 2001	"On a Night Like This"	15th place	
Phonographic Performance Company of Australia	2001	100 Most Broadcast Recordings of 2001	"Kids"	63rd place	
Phonographic Performance Company of Australia	2002	50 Most Broadcast Artists of 2002	Kylie Minogue	Won	
Phonographic Performance Company of Australia	2002	100 Most Broadcast Recordings of 2002	"Can't Get You Out of My Head"	7th place	
Phonographic Performance Company of Australia	2002	100 Most Broadcast Recordings of 2002	"In Your Eyes"	12th place	
Phonographic Performance Company of Australia	2002	100 Most Broadcast Recordings of 2002	"Love at First Sight"	48th place	
Phonographic Performance Company of Australia	2002	100 Most Broadcast Recordings of 2002	"On a Night Like This"	98th place	
Phonographic Performance Company of Australia	2003	50 Most Broadcast Artists of 2003	Kylie Minogue	Won	
Phonographic Performance Company of Australia	2003	100 Most Broadcast Recordings of 2003	"Fever"	16th place	
Phonographic Performance Company of Australia	2003	100 Most Broadcast Recordings of 2003	"Come into My World"	20th place	
Phonographic Performance Company of Australia	2003	100 Most Broadcast Recordings of 2003	"Love at First Sight"	35th place	
Phonographic Performance Company of Australia	2004	50 Most Broadcast Artists of 2004	Kylie Minogue	2nd place	
Phonographic Performance Company of Australia	2004	100 Most Broadcast Recordings of 2004	"Red Blooded Woman"	55th place	
Phonographic Performance Company of Australia	2004	100 Most Broadcast Recordings of 2004	"Slow"	64th place	
Phonographic Performance Company of Australia	2005	50 Most Broadcast Artists of 2005	Kylie Minogue	Won	
Phonographic Performance Company of Australia	2005	100 Most Broadcast Recordings of 2005	"I Believe in You"	19th place	
Phonographic Performance Company of Australia	2005	100 Most Broadcast Recordings of 2005	"Giving You Up"	79th place	
Phonographic Performance Company of Australia	2006	50 Most Broadcast Artists of 2006	Kylie Minogue	18th place	
Phonographic Performance Company of Australia	2007	50 Most Broadcast Artists of 2007	Kylie Minogue	35th place	
Phonographic Performance Company of Australia	2008	50 Most Broadcast Artists of 2008	Kylie Minogue	22nd place	
Premios 40 Principales	2010	Best International Artist	Kylie Minogue	Nominated	
Premios Ondas	2004	Special Jury Award †	Kylie Minogue	Won	
Porin	1996	Best International Video	"Where the Wild Roses Grow" (with Nick Cave and the Bad Seeds)	Won	
Premios Oye!	2002	Song of the Year	"Can't Get You Out of My Head"	Nominated	
Q Awards	2002	Best Video	"Can't Get You Out of My Head"	Nominated	
Q Awards	2007	Q Idol	Kylie Minogue	Won	
Rolling Stone Australia Awards	2022	Rolling Stone Global Award	Kylie Minogue	Nominated	
Rolling Stone Australia Awards	2023	Rolling Stone Global Award	Kylie Minogue	Nominated	
Rolling Stone Australia Awards	2024	Rolling Stone Global Award	Kylie Minogue	Nominated	
Rolling Stone Australia Awards	2025	Rolling Stone Global Award	Kylie Minogue	Nominated	
Rose d'Or	2004	Best Music	Granada Television for Kylie	Nominated	
Silver Clef Award	2001	Best International Artist	Kylie Minogue	Won	
Silver Clef Award	2012	25th Anniversary O2 Silver Clef Award †	Kylie Minogue	Won	
Smash Hits Readers' Poll	1988	Best Dressed Person	Kylie Minogue	2nd place	
Smash Hits Readers' Poll	1988	Worst Dressed Person	Kylie Minogue	10th place	
Smash Hits Readers' Poll	1988	Worst Female Solo Singer	Kylie Minogue	3rd place	
Smash Hits Readers' Poll	1988	Most Fanciable Female	Kylie Minogue	Won	
Smash Hits Readers' Poll	1988	Best Female Solo Singer	Kylie Minogue	Won	
Smash Hits Readers' Poll	1988	Best LP	Kylie	3rd place	
Smash Hits Readers' Poll	1988	Worst LP	Kylie	4th place	
Smash Hits Readers' Poll	1988	Best Single	"The Loco-Motion"	2nd place	
Smash Hits Readers' Poll	1988	Best Pop Video	"The Loco-Motion"	3rd place	
Smash Hits Readers' Poll	1988	Worst Pop Video	"The Loco-Motion"	7th place	
Smash Hits Readers' Poll	1988	Worst Pop Video	"I Should Be So Lucky"	4th place	
Smash Hits Readers' Poll	1988	Worst Single	"I Should Be So Lucky"	2nd place	
Smash Hits Readers' Poll	1989	Best Female Solo Singer	Kylie Minogue	Won	
Smash Hits Readers' Poll	1989	Worst Female Solo Singer	Kylie Minogue	Won	
Smash Hits Readers' Poll	1989	Most Fanciable Female	Kylie Minogue	Won	
Smash Hits Readers' Poll	1989	Best Dressed Person	Kylie Minogue	3rd place	
Smash Hits Readers' Poll	1989	Worst Dressed Person	Kylie Minogue	3rd place	
Smash Hits Readers' Poll	1989	The Most Completely Useless Person	Kylie Minogue	5th place	
Smash Hits Readers' Poll	1989	Worst Haircut	Kylie Minogue	9th place	
Smash Hits Readers' Poll	1989	Most Very Horrible Thing	Kylie Minogue	5th place	
Smash Hits Readers' Poll	1989	Best LP	Kylie	9th place	
Smash Hits Readers' Poll	1989	Best Single	"Hand on Your Heart"	4th place	
Smash Hits Readers' Poll	1989	Worst Pop Video	"Hand on Your Heart"	3rd place	
Smash Hits Readers' Poll	1989	Best Pop Video	"Hand on Your Heart"	10th place	
Smash Hits Readers' Poll	1989	Best Pop Video	"Wouldn't Change a Thing"	5th place	
Smash Hits Readers' Poll	1989	Best Single	"Wouldn't Change a Thing"	10th place	
Smash Hits Readers' Poll	1990	Best Single	"Better the Devil You Know"	4th place	
Smash Hits Readers' Poll	1990	Worst Single	"Better the Devil You Know"	4th place	
Smash Hits Readers' Poll	1990	Worst LP	Enjoy Yourself	6th place	
Smash Hits Readers' Poll	1990	Worst Dressed Person	Kylie Minogue	Won	
Smash Hits Readers' Poll	1990	Worst Female Solo Singer	Kylie Minogue	Won	
Smash Hits Readers' Poll	1990	Worst Haircut	Kylie Minogue	5th place	
Smash Hits Readers' Poll	1990	Most Very Horrible Thing	Kylie Minogue	2nd place	
Smash Hits Readers' Poll	1990	Most Completely Useless Person	Kylie Minogue	3rd place	
Smash Hits Readers' Poll	1990	Most Fanciable Female	Kylie Minogue	3rd place	
Smash Hits Readers' Poll	1990	Best Female Solo Singer	Kylie Minogue	5th place	
Smash Hits Readers' Poll	1991	Best Female Solo Singer	Kylie Minogue	4th place	
Smash Hits Readers' Poll	1991	Best Dressed Person	Kylie Minogue	9th place	
Smash Hits Readers' Poll	1991	Most Fanciable Female	Kylie Minogue	4th place	
Smash Hits Readers' Poll	1991	Best Actress	Kylie Minogue	10th place	
Smash Hits Readers' Poll	1991	The Most Completely Useless Person	Kylie Minogue	5th place	
Smash Hits Readers' Poll	1991	Worst Haircut in Pop	Kylie Minogue	5th place	
Smash Hits Readers' Poll	1991	The Most Very Horrible Thing	Kylie Minogue	4th place	
Smash Hits Readers' Poll	1991	Worst Dressed Person	Kylie Minogue	2nd place	
Smash Hits Readers' Poll	1991	Worst Female Solo Singer	Kylie Minogue	Won	
Smash Hits Readers' Poll	1991	Worst Pop Video	"Shocked"	3rd place	
Smash Hits Readers' Poll	1991	Worst Single	"Shocked"	6th place	
Smash Hits Readers' Poll	1991	Best Single	"Shocked"	10th place	
Smash Hits Readers' Poll	1994	Best Single	"Confide in Me"	7th place	
Smash Hits Readers' Poll	1994	Best Pop Video	"Confide in Me"	3rd place	
Smash Hits Readers' Poll	1994	Best Album	Kylie Minogue	3rd place	
Smash Hits Readers' Poll	1994	Worst Female Singer	Kylie Minogue	Won	
Smash Hits Readers' Poll	1994	Best Female Solo Singer	Kylie Minogue	3rd place	
Smash Hits Readers' Poll	1994	Best Dressed Person	Kylie Minogue	10th place	
Smash Hits Readers' Poll	1994	Worst Dressed Person	Kylie Minogue	4th place	
Smash Hits Readers' Poll	1994	Best Haircut	Kylie Minogue	8th place	
Smash Hits Readers' Poll	1994	Most Tragic Haircut	Kylie Minogue	4th place	
Smash Hits Readers' Poll	1994	Most Fanciable Female Star	Kylie Minogue	4th place	
Smash Hits Readers' Poll	1994	Least Fanciable Female	Kylie Minogue	2nd place	
Smash Hits Readers' Poll	1994	Sad Loser of '94	Kylie Minogue	8th place	
Smash Hits Readers' Poll	2001	Best Female	Kylie Minogue	Nominated	
Smash Hits Readers' Poll	2001	Best Single	"Can't Get You Out of My Head"	Nominated	
Smash Hits Readers' Poll	2002	Best International Act	Kylie Minogue	2nd place	
Smash Hits Readers' Poll	2002	Best Live Act	Kylie Minogue	9th place	
Smash Hits Readers' Poll	2002	Most Fanciable Female	Kylie Minogue	4th place	
Smash Hits Readers' Poll	2002	Best Female Solo	Kylie Minogue	3rd place	
Smash Hits Readers' Poll	2004	Smash Hits Hall of Fame †	Kylie Minogue	Won	
TMF Awards	2004	Best International Video	"Slow"	Won	
Top of the Pops Awards	2001	Best Pop Act	Kylie Minogue	Nominated	
Top of the Pops Awards	2001	Best Tour	On a Night Like This Tour	Won	
Top of the Pops Awards	2001	Best Single	"Can't Get You Out of My Head"	Won	
Top of the Pops Awards	2002	Top Tour	KylieFever2002	Won	
UK Music Video Awards	2011	Best Live Music Coverage	Aphrodite: Les Folies Tour	Nominated	
UK Music Video Awards	2011	Best Pop Video – UK	"Get Outta My Way"	Nominated	
UK Music Video Awards	2011	Best Styling	"Get Outta My Way"	Nominated	
UK Music Video Awards	2019	Best Live Concert	Golden Live Tour	Won	
Variety Club Showbusiness Awards	2002	Showbusiness Personality †	Kylie Minogue	Won	
Virgin Holidays Attitude Awards	2017	Legend Award †	Kylie Minogue	Won	
Virgin Media Music Awards	2007	Best International Act	Kylie Minogue	Nominated	
Virgin Media Music Awards	2007	Best Track	"2 Hearts"	Nominated	
Virgin Media Music Awards	2007	Best Video	"2 Hearts"	Nominated	
Virgin Media Music Awards	2008	Legend Of The Year	Kylie Minogue	Won	
Virgin Media Music Awards	2011	Best Album	Aphrodite	Won	
Virgin Media Music Awards	2011	Best Track	"All the Lovers"	Won	
Vodafone Live Music Awards	2007	Best Show Production	Showgirl: The Homecoming Tour	Won	
Wembley Arena	2007	Special Award †	Kylie Minogue	Won	
World Music Awards	1991	Best Selling Australian Artist of the Year	Kylie Minogue	Won	
World Music Awards	2002	Best Selling Australian Artist of the Year	Kylie Minogue	Won	
World Popular Song Festival	1989	Grand Prix International	"Got to Be Certain"	Canceled (Note: The festival was canceled in 1989 due to various reasons.)	
Žebřík Music Awards	2002	Kylie Minogue	Best International Female	Nominated	

== State and academic honours ==
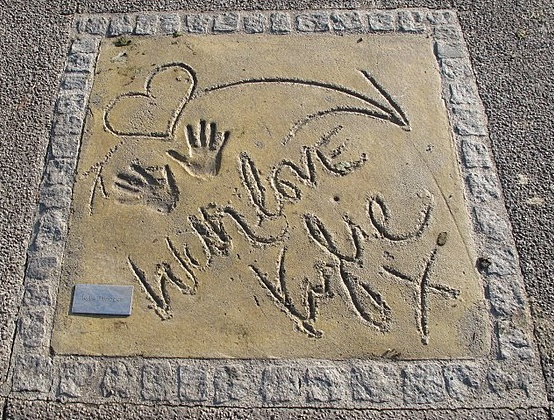
Handprints and signature of Minogue in Olympiapark, Munich in 2015

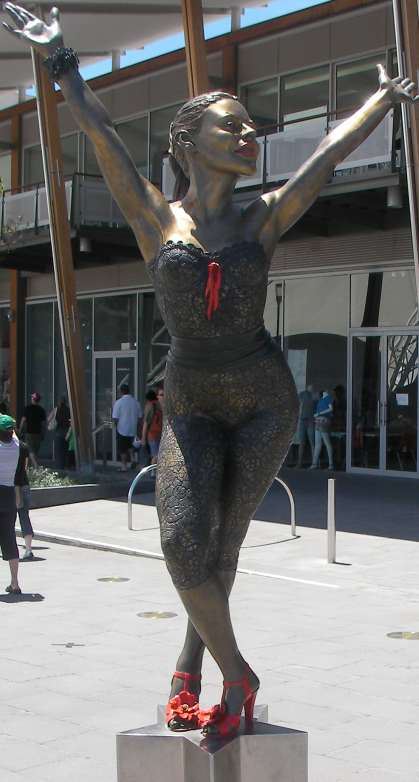
Bronze statue of Minogue at Waterfront City, as part of the Melbourne's Walk of Stars

State and academic honours for Minogue
Country or organization	Year	Award	Ref(s).
American Australian Association	2020	Excellence in Arts Award	
Anglia Ruskin University	2011	Honorary Doctor of Health Sciences	
Australia	2003	Centenary Medal	
Australia	2012	National Living Treasure	
Australia	2019	Officer of the Order of Australia (AO)	
Britain–Australia Society	2016	Britain–Australia Society Award	
France	2008	Chevalier de Ordre des Arts et des Lettres	
United Kingdom	2007	Officer of the Order of the British Empire (OBE)	

=== Other tributes ===
Other tributes to Minogue
Country	Year	Category	Ref(s).
Australia	2006	Melbourne's Walk of Stars (bronze statue and star)	
Australia	2012	Madame Tussauds (wax figure)	
Australia	2014	Melbourne's Walk of Fame (plaque)	
Australia	2025	Rod Laver Arena (gold star)	
Germany	2011	Munich Olympic Walk of Stars (handprints and signature)	
United Kingdom	2007	Madame Tussauds (wax figures)	
United Kingdom	2007	Wembley Arena's Square of Fame (handprints)	
United Kingdom	2025	The O2 Arena ("21 Club" Key) (Note: Minogue received a key to the O2 Arena for being the first female solo artist to perform a total of 21 times at the venue.)	
United States	2025	Empire State Building (trophy and lights in green and gold colours)	
