= Fever (Kylie Minogue album) =

2001 album by Kylie Minogue

Studio album by Kylie Minogue
- Released: 1 October 2001
- Recorded: January–August 2001
- Studios: Biffco (Dublin); Big (London); BJG (London); Hutch (Chicago); Olympic (London); Phil's (London); Rob's (London); Stella (Canterbury)
- Genres: Dance-pop; nu-disco; synth-pop
- Length: 45:27
- Labels: Parlophone; Festival Mushroom
- Producers: Steve Anderson; Rob Davis; Cathy Dennis; Greg Fitzgerald; Pascal Gabriel; Julian Gallagher; Tom Nichols; Mark Picchiotti; Richard Stannard; Paul Statham; TommyD

Kylie Minogue chronology
Hits + (2000)	Fever (2001)	Confide in Me (2002)

Alternative cover
- US edition and Asian special edition cover

Singles from Fever
- 1. "Can't Get You Out of My Head" Released: 8 September 2001; 2. "In Your Eyes" Released: 21 January 2002; 3. "Love at First Sight" Released: 3 June 2002; 4. "Come into My World" Released: 4 November 2002

Fever is the eighth studio album by Australian singer Kylie Minogue. It was released on 1 October 2001, by Parlophone. Minogue worked with writers and producers such as Cathy Dennis, Rob Davis, Richard Stannard, Julian Gallagher, TommyD, Tom Nichols, Pascal Gabriel and others to create a disco and Europop-influenced dance-pop and nu-disco record. Other musical influences of the album range from synth-pop to club music.

Fever was well received by critics upon its release, many of whom praised its production and commercial appeal. Over the years the album has received widespread critical acclaim and has been retrospectively declared the greatest album of Minogue's career by publications such as NME. A global commercial success, it peaked at number one in Australia, Austria, Germany, Ireland, Russia, and the UK. In the US, the album peaked at number three on the Billboard 200, and was certified platinum by the Recording Industry Association of America (RIAA); it became Minogue's best-selling album in the country. The album was also certified septuple platinum by the Australian Recording Industry Association (ARIA), and quintuple platinum by the British Phonographic Industry (BPI). At the 2002 Brit Awards, it won International Album.

Fever produced four singles. The lead single "Can't Get You Out of My Head" peaked atop the charts of 40 countries. Often recognised as Minogue's signature song, it is her best-selling single with twelve million units sold worldwide. "In Your Eyes" and "Love at First Sight" also became international hits, while "Come into My World" won Minogue her first Grammy Award, for Best Dance Recording, in 2004. To further promote the album, Minogue embarked on her seventh concert tour, KylieFever2002. Fever has sold six million copies worldwide as of 2012 .

== Background and production ==
In 1998, Minogue was dropped from her label Deconstruction following the poor commercial performance of her sixth studio album Impossible Princess. She instead signed on to Parlophone and released her seventh studio album Light Years. The disco and Europop-inspired album was a critical and commercial success, and was later certified four times-platinum in Minogue's native country Australia for shipment of 280,000 units, and platinum in the UK for shipment of 300,000 units. "Spinning Around" was released as the lead single off the album and was a commercial success, attaining a platinum certification in Australia for shipment of 70,000 units, and a silver certification in the United Kingdom for shipment of 200,000 units. She promoted the album by embarking on the On a Night Like This tour.

Soon after, Minogue began work on her eighth studio album Fever. On the album, she collaborated with producers and writers such as British singer-songwriter Cathy Dennis, who co-wrote two songs out of the three she co-produced, Rob Davis, who co-produced and co-wrote three songs, and Richard Stannard and Julian Gallagher, who co-produced and co-wrote five songs ("Love at First Sight", "In Your Eyes", "Love Affair", "Boy" and "Rendezvous at Sunset"). In the vein of Light Years, Fever is a disco and dance-pop album that contains elements of adult contemporary and club music. The album was recorded at studios such as the Windmill Lane Studios in Dublin, Hutch Studios in Chicago, Olympic Studios in London and Stella Studios.

== Music and lyrics ==
"Love at First Sight"
A 21-second sample of the chorus of the third single, "Love at First Sight", indicative of the album's "Euro-flavoured" dance-pop sound.

Fever is primarily a dance-pop album, with prominent elements of 1970s-influenced disco and Europop. Jacqueline Hodges from BBC Music wrote that the album is not "pure pop", and is rather characterized by a more adventurous dance-oriented sound. NME critic Alex Needham identified a "filter disco effect", described as "the one that sounds like you've gone under water and then ecstatically come up for air," working on various songs on the album. Furthermore, Jaelani Turner-Williams of Stereogum retrospectively classified the record as a nu-disco album. Needham saw Fever as an "update" from the "frothy disco" of Light Years. Songs like the opening track "More More More" and closing track "Burning Up" are examples of the disco-influenced production of the album. The former is an uptempo song with a "funky" bassline, while the latter was described as a "slow burn" disco song. Teen pop elements appear on songs like "Love at First Sight", which begins with an electric piano intro, and the "aggressive" "Give It to Me".

The lead single "Can't Get You Out of My Head" is a "robotic" midtempo dance and disco song. Many critics felt that various songs on the album, particularly "Come into My World", are similar to "Can't Get You Out of My Head". The title track and "Dancefloor" draw influences from synthpop and club music, respectively. "In Your Eyes" contains hints of disco and techno music. Minor influences of ambient music surface on the "atmospheric" "Fragile". Minogue's vocal delivery ranges from "sensuous" (in "More More More") to "sweet" (in "Your Love"). The latter track contains instrumentation from an acoustic guitar. Jason Thompson from PopMatters commented that Minogue "knows how to express herself through irresistible melodies and seductive emoting", such as on the title track, which makes use of "suggestive panting". Unlike Minogue's previous studio efforts, Fever does not contain any ballads.

The lyrical content of Fever chiefly focuses on themes of love and enjoyment. Thompson described the album to be "all about dancing, fucking, and having a good time". In the song "Love at First Sight", Minogue describes how she fell in love with her partner at "first sight" and how it led to good things happening for her. "Can't Get You Out of My Head" was termed a "mystery" as the singer never mentions who her object of desire in the song is. Lynskey Dorian from The Guardian suggested that Minogue refers to either "a partner, an evasive one-night stand or someone who doesn't know she exists" as her obsession. The production of "Give It to Me" contrasts with its lyrics: Minogue urges her partner to "slow down," but the beat "goes in the opposite direction and tells your body to push it a little more on the dance floor." The lyrics of "Fragile" are simple and aim directly at the "[listener's] heart". "Come into My World" is a "plea for love" as Minogue invites her partner into her life. On the other hand, "Dancefloor" focuses on issues like dealing with an end of a relationship, with Minogue celebrating a break-up by "[losing] it in the music".

== Artwork and release ==
Minogue's close friend and stylist William Baker, collaborated with graphic designer Tony Hung to create the artwork's concept of electro-minimalism. On the cover, which was photographed by Vincent Peters and inspired by the cover of Grace Jones' Island Life (1985), Minogue is seen "bound by a microphone cord, literally tied to her craft" and dressed in white leotard designed by Fee Doran, under the label of Mrs Jones, and shoes made by Manolo Blahnik. In her 2012 fashion retrospective book Kylie / Fashion, Minogue commented on the album's theme, saying: "The whole campaign was so strong, sure, ice cool. Willie's [William's] styling was incredible and [Peters'] photography made for a second amazing album cover with him." A new cover was issued for the US version of the album and features a close-up of Minogue biting on a bracelet. The US version cover also served as one of two CD single covers for second single of the album, "In Your Eyes".

Fever was released by Parlophone on 1 October 2001, in Australia, the United Kingdom, and other European countries. In the United States, the album was released by Capitol Records on 26 February 2002, and was Minogue's first album to be released in the country since her second studio album Enjoy Yourself (1989), but that project failed to chart there. Thus, Minogue was reintroduced to the US after nearly 13 years of inactivity in the region. A special edition of the album, containing a previously unreleased track entitled "Whenever You Feel Like It", was released on 19 November 2002.

== Promotion ==
=== Tour ===
Minogue launched the KylieFever2002 concert tour to promote the album. The tour was split in seven acts and "Can't Get You Out of My Head", "Come into My World", "Fever", "In Your Eyes", "Love at First Sight" and "Burning Up" were the songs from the album to be included on the setlist. For the performances, Minogue wore "skimpy" and skin-tight outfits, and was often seen wearing a glittering silver bikini and skirt coupled with silver boots. The outfits were designed by Italian luxury industry fashion house Dolce and Gabbana, and Minogue went through a total of eight costume changes during the tour. The performances that took place at the Manchester Evening News Arena, England, were filmed for inclusion in the live DVD for the concert tour entitled KylieFever2002: Live in Manchester, which was released on 18 November 2002. The DVD was certified platinum in Canada for sales of 10,000 units, gold in Germany for sales of 25,000 units, and double-platinum in the United Kingdom for shipments of 100,000 units.

=== Singles ===
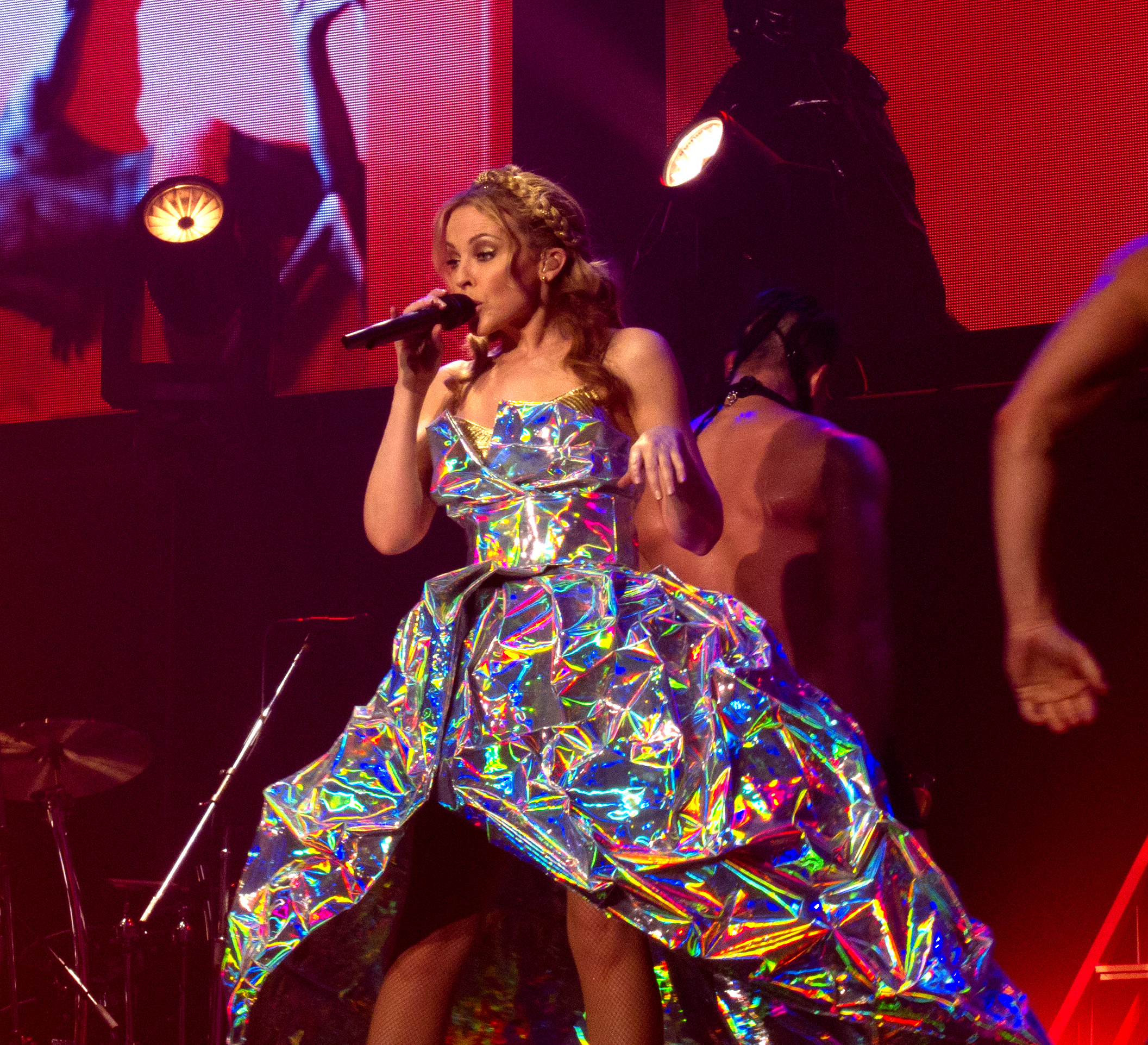
Minogue performing lead single "Can't Get You Out of My Head" during her Aphrodite: Les Folies Tour, 2011

"Can't Get You Out of My Head" was released as the lead single from the album on 8 September 2001. The song was well received by music critics, many of whom complimented its vibe and danceability. Commercially, the single was a massive success and peaked at number one on the charts of every European country (except Finland) and Australia. The song was released in the United States on 18 February 2002 and managed to peak at number seven on the Billboard Hot 100 chart, becoming Minogue's best selling single in the region since "The Locomotion". It was certified triple-platinum in Australia for shipment of 210,000 units, platinum in the United Kingdom for shipment of 600,000 units, and gold in the United States for shipment of 500,000 units. An accompanying music video for the single was directed by Dawn Shadforth and features Minogue and a number of backup dancers dancing in various futuristic backdrops.

"In Your Eyes" was released as the second single of the album on 21 January 2002, but in Europe, the release was delayed to 18 February due to the success of "Can't Get You Out of My Head". It received generally positive reviews from music critics and was praised for its house influences. It became the second consecutive single from the album to peak atop the Australian Singles Chart. The song was also commercially successful internationally and peaked in the top ten of charts in countries like Italy, Finland, Switzerland, and the United Kingdom. It was certified gold in Australia for sales of 35,000 units, and silver in the United Kingdom for sales of 200,000 units. An accompanying music video for the song was again directed by Shadforth, and features Minogue performing a dance routine and striking various poses in a colourful neon-lighted room.

"Love at First Sight" was released as the third single from the album on 3 June 2002. It received positive reviews from music critics, with many favouring its production. The song was a commercial success and peaked in the top ten of charts in countries like Australia, Denmark, Italy, New Zealand and United Kingdom. The song was remixed by Ruff and Jam and this version was released in the United States, where it managed to chart at number 23 on the Billboard Hot 100 chart. It was certified gold in Australia for sales of 35,000 units and in New Zealand for sales of 7,500 units. An accompanying music video for the single was directed by Johan Renck and features Minogue dancing in a futuristic environment sporting cargo pants and teal eyeshadow. The song was later nominated for the Grammy Award for Best Dance Recording in 2003.

"Come into My World" was released as the fourth and final single off the album on 4 November 2002. Slightly remixed, the single version featured new vocals in the verses and chorus. It generated a favourable response from music critics, who enjoyed its lyrical content. Commercially, the single performed fairly well and peaked in the top 10 in Australia, Belgium (French-speaking Wallonia region), and the United Kingdom. In the United States, the song peaked at number 91 on the Billboard Hot 100 chart. It received a gold certification in Australia for sales of 35,000 units. An accompanying music video for the song was directed by Michel Gondry and features Minogue strolling around a busy street in Paris, France; every time she completes a full circle, a duplicate of her appears through one of the stores, and by the end of the video there are four Minogues present together. The song was later honoured with a Grammy Award for Best Dance Recording during the 2004 ceremony.

== Critical reception ==
Professional ratings
Aggregate scores
Source	Rating
Metacritic	68/100
Review scores
Source	Rating
AllMusic	5/5 stars
Dotmusic	7/10
Entertainment Weekly	B+
The Guardian	3/5 stars
NME	7/10
Pitchfork	7.6/10
Q	3/5 stars
Rolling Stone	3/5 stars
The Rolling Stone Album Guide	4/5 stars
Slant Magazine	2.5/5 stars

Fever received generally favourable reviews from music critics. At Metacritic, which assigns a normalized rating out of 100 to reviews from mainstream critics, Fever received an average score of 68 based on 15 reviews, indicating "generally favourable reviews". Jason Thompson from PopMatters gave the album an extremely positive review and praised the conception and production of the album, calling it a "perfect album of gorgeous dance music" and claiming that "there probably won't be a better album like it all year long". Chris True from AllMusic also gave it an acclaimed review and enjoyed the simple disco and dancepop music of the album, saying that there is "not one weak track, not one misplaced syrupy ballad to ruin the groove". Alex Needham from NME positively reviewed the album and noted that while the album lacks depth, it is "as effervescent as a foot spa" and that through the album, Minogue "shows the upstarts how it's done". Dominique Leone from Pitchfork gave it a favourable review and praised its simple and "comfortable" composition, terming it a "mature sound from a mature artist, and one that may very well re-establish Minogue for the VH1 generation".

Alexis Petridis from The Guardian praised the commercial nature of the album and called it "a mature pop album only in that it's aimed at the boozy girl's night out rather than the school disco". Jacqueline Hodges favoured the album's consistency and complimented its commercial prospect, predicting that the album is "going to sell bucket loads". Jim Farber from Entertainment Weekly labelled the album "the best guilty-pleasure retro-dance smash since Eiffel 65's "Blue"", but felt that Minogue "milks the formula (of "Can't Get You Out of My Head") dry on the album". Michael Hubbard from MusicOMH enjoyed the fun nature of the album and said that "if you want something to drive to, dance to, play at a house party or cheer your workmates up with, Fever is for you". Sal Cinquemani from Slant Magazine gave the album a negative review, criticizing Minogue's "painfully precise" vocals and the album's monotony.

== Accolades ==
Fever also brought Minogue a number of accolades and award nominations. At the 2002 ARIA Music Awards ceremony, the album won the awards for Best Pop Release and Highest Selling Album, and garnered a nomination in the category of Album of the Year. At the same ceremony, "Can't Get You Out of My Head" won the awards for Single of the Year and Highest Selling Single, and Minogue won the Outstanding Achievement Award. At the 2002 Brit Awards ceremony, Fever won the award for Best International Album, while Minogue was nominated for Best International Female Solo Artist and Best Pop Act, winning the former. At the 2002 MTV Europe Music Awards ceremony, the album was nominated for Best Album; Minogue was nominated for Best Female Act, Best Dance Act, and Best Pop Act, winning the latter two.

Minogue earned her first Grammy Award nomination when "Love at First Sight" was nominated in the category of Best Dance Recording at the 2003 award ceremony, although it lost to British electronic band Dirty Vegas's song "Days Go By". She eventually won a Grammy Award when "Come into My World" was nominated in the same category at the 2004 award ceremony. It marked the first time an Australian music artist had won at the Grammy Awards show since Australian rock band Men at Work won the award for Best New Artist in 1982, as well as Minogue's career-first Grammy win. In 2015, Fever was ranked 34th on "The 99 Greatest Dance Albums of All Time" by Vice magazine. In December 2021, the album was listed at no. 10 in Rolling Stone Australia's ‘200 Greatest Albums of All Time’ countdown.

== Commercial performance ==
In Minogue's native country Australia, Fever entered at number one on the Australian Albums Chart on the week of 21 October 2001, and spent a total of five weeks in the position. In this region, Fever was certified seven-times platinum for shipments of 490,000 units by the Australian Recording Industry Association. The success of the album in Australia was such that it was listed in the top-ten highest selling albums of the country in both 2001 and 2002, appearing at numbers five and four, respectively. It also became the best selling dance album in the country in both 2001 and 2002. In the United Kingdom, Fever entered at number one on the UK Albums Chart on the week of 13 October 2001 with sales of 139,000 units, and spent a total of two weeks in the position. The album spent 20 weeks inside the top ten and over 50 weeks inside the top forty of the chart. In this region, the album was certified five-times platinum by the British Phonographic Industry for shipments of 1,500,000 units. Following the album's 20th anniversary, in October 2021 the album re-entered the UK Albums Chart at number 23, its highest chart position since August 2002.

The album achieved similar success in other regions. In Austria, the album entered at number one on the Austrian Albums Chart and spent a total of 29 weeks on the chart. In this territory, it was certified platinum for sales of 15,000 units by the International Federation of the Phonographic Industry. In Denmark, the album entered and peaked at number four on the Danish Albums Chart and spent one week at this position. In this region, it was certified gold by the International Federation of the Phonographic Industry. In France, the album entered the French Albums Chart at number 51 and peaked at number 21, spending a total of three weeks at this position. In this region, the album was certified platinum for sales of 100,000 units by the Syndicat National de l'Édition Phonographique. In Germany, the album peaked at number one on the German Albums Chart for two weeks. In this region, it was certified platinum by the Federal Association of Music Industry for shipments of 200,000 units. In Ireland, the album entered the Irish Albums Chart at number two and peaked at number one, spending a total of one week on this position. In New Zealand, the album entered and peaked at number three on the New Zealand Albums Chart, spending a total of one week at this position. In this region, the album was certified double-platinum by the Recording Industry Association of New Zealand for shipments of 30,000 units. In Switzerland, the album entered the Swiss Albums Chart at number 12 and peaked at number three, spending a total of one week in the position. In this territory, the album was certified double-platinum by the International Federation of the Phonographic Industry for sales of 40,000 units.

In the United States, the album sold 115,000 copies in its first-week and debuted at number three on the Billboard 200 chart, becoming Minogue's highest-charting album in the region to date. In this region, the album was certified platinum by the Recording Industry Association of America for shipments of 1,000,000 units. In Canada, the album peaked at number 10 on the Canadian Albums Chart and spent a total of two weeks on this position. In this region, the album was certified double-platinum for shipments of 200,000 units by Music Canada. According to the IFPI, Fever was the thirtieth-best-selling album globally in the year 2002. Fever has sold over 6 million copies worldwide, becoming Minogue's highest selling album.

== Legacy ==
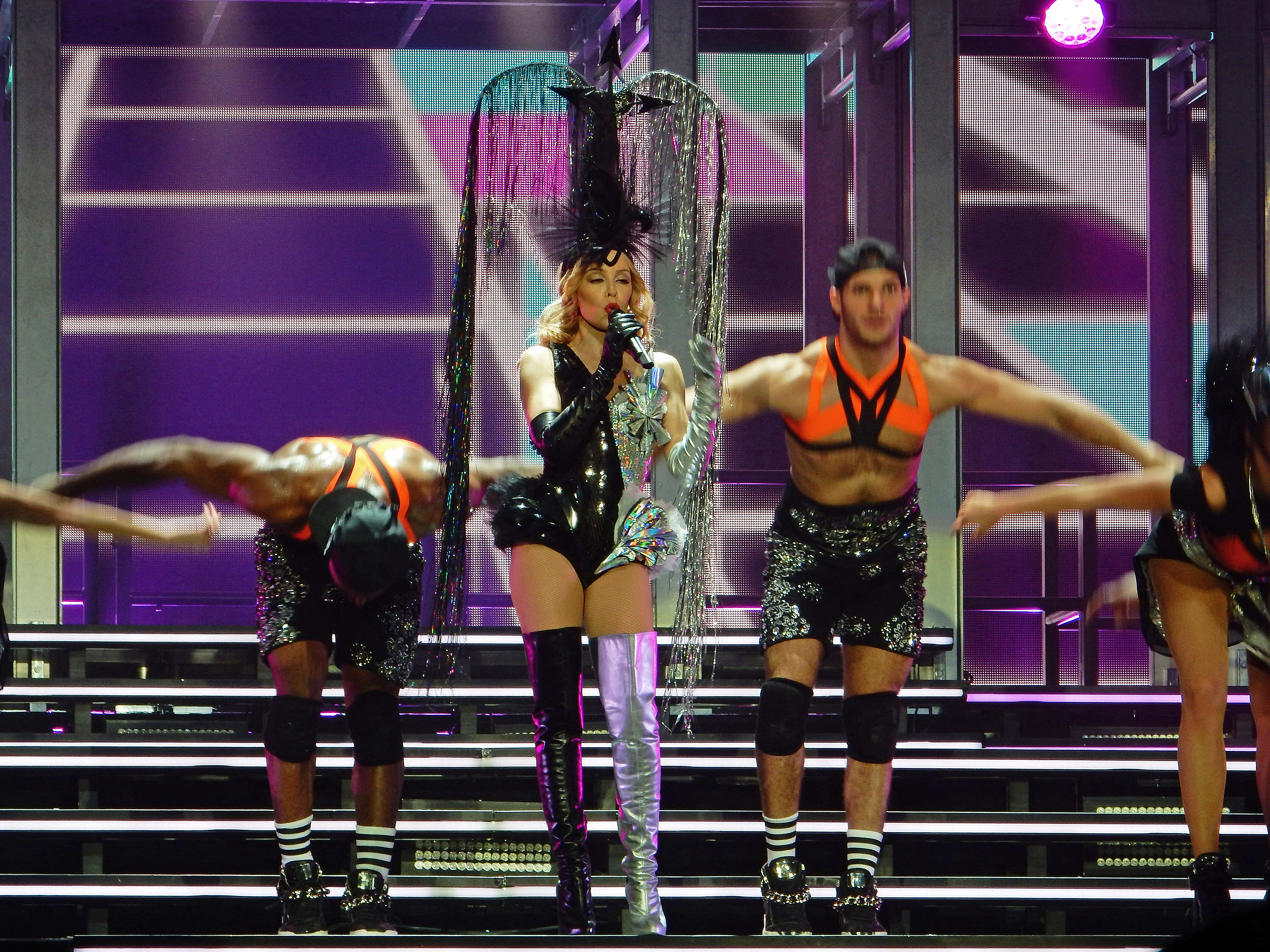
Minogue performing "Love at First Sight", during her Kiss Me Once Tour (2014)

Fever is considered to be a prominent example of Minogue's constant "reinventions". The image she adopted during this period was described by Baker as "slick, minimalist and postmodern", and it was seen as a step forward from the "camp-infused" tone of Light Years. Larissa Dubecki from The Age used the term "nu-disco diva" to describe Minogue during this period. Andy Battaglia from The A.V. Club opined that Minogue's public image and her persona in her music videos "presented herself as a mechanical muse whose every gesture snapped and locked into place with the sound of a vacuum seal". He further remarked that the singer's "hygienic coo summoned a cool sort of cyborg soul, and her videos showed her gliding through sleek futurescapes, tonguing the sweet-and-sour tang of a techno kiss".

Adrien Begrand from PopMatters felt that the simplicity of the album made it a "classy piece of work" and commented that Minogue's experience and choice of collaborators resulted in "the thirtysomething Minogue upstaging soulless, brainless music by younger American pop tarts like Britney [Spears] and Christina [Aguilera]". Robbie Daw from Idolator pointed out that Britney Spears's recording of her 2004 hit "Toxic", Madonna's comeback album Confessions on a Dance Floor (2005), Paris Hilton's musical debut Paris (2006), and radio stations' shift towards playing "more groove-oriented sounds" all followed the release of Fever, although he mentioned that "we have no way of knowing whether [Fever] was directly responsible for these pop happenings". Nick Levine from NME ranked Fever as the greatest album of Minogue's career, noting "the project’s effortless confidence and strength in depth."

Chris True from AllMusic, in his biography of Minogue, commented that the release of the album and lead single "Can't Get You Out of My Head" cemented her position as an international music icon, saying "Her place in pop music history would be consolidated in 2001, and she would be reintroduced to America after more than a decade as well". The lead single peaked atop charts in 40 countries and sold more than six million copies worldwide, becoming Minogue's highest selling single to date and one of the best-selling singles of all time. The song is notable for being Minogue's biggest and strongest commercial breakthrough in the United States, a region in which Minogue previously had managed to achieve little success. It is also considered to be Minogue's signature song. Due to the single's commercial impact, the album enjoyed similar success in the United States and earned Minogue her only platinum album certification in the region.

== Track listing ==
Fever – Standard version
No.	Title	Writer(s)	Producer(s)	Length
1.	"More More More"	Tommy D; Liz Winstanley	Tommy D	4:40
2.	"Love at First Sight"	Kylie Minogue; Richard "Biff" Stannard; Julian Gallagher; Ash Howes; Martin Harrington	Stannard; Gallagher	3:57
3.	"Can't Get You Out of My Head"	Cathy Dennis; Rob Davis	Dennis; Davis	3:49
4.	"Fever"	Greg Fitzgerald; Tom Nichols	Fitzgerald	3:30
5.	"Give It to Me"	Minogue; Mark Picchiotti; Steve Anderson	Picchiotti	2:48
6.	"Fragile"	Davis	Davis	3:44
7.	"Come into My World"	Dennis; Davis	Dennis; Davis	4:30
8.	"In Your Eyes"	Minogue; Stannard; Gallagher; Howes	Stannard; Gallagher	3:18
9.	"Dancefloor"	Anderson; Dennis	Anderson	3:23
10.	"Love Affair"	Minogue; Stannard; Gallagher	Stannard; Gallagher	3:47
11.	"Your Love"	Minogue; Pascal Gabriel; Paul Statham	Gabriel; Statham	3:47
12.	"Burning Up"	Fitzgerald; Nichols	Fitzgerald; Nichols	3:59
Total length:				45:27

Fever – Australian standard edition
No.	Title	Writer(s)	Producer(s)	Length
13.	"Tightrope"	Minogue; Gabriel; Statham	Gabriel; Statham	4:27
Total length:				49:54

Fever – American limited edition bonus tracks
No.	Title	Writer(s)	Producer(s)	Length
13.	"Boy"	Minogue; Stannard; Gallagher	Stannard; Gallagher	3:47
14.	"Butterfly"	Minogue; Anderson	Picchiotti	4:09
Total length:				53:23

Fever – Japanese edition
No.	Title	Writer(s)	Producer(s)	Length
12.	"Good Like That"	Joe Belmaati; Mich Hansen; Kara DioGuardi	Cutfather; Belmaati; DioGuardi	3:33
13.	"Baby"	Winstanley; Bottolf Lodemal; Lars Aass	Winstanley; Lodemal; Aass	3:49
14.	"Burning Up"	Fitzgerald; Nichols	Fitzgerald; Nichols	3:59
Total length:				52:49

Fever – Japanese re-issue bonus tracks
No.	Title	Writer(s)	Producer(s)	Length
15.	"Boy"	Minogue; Stannard; Gallagher	Stannard; Gallagher	3:49
16.	"Butterfly"	Minogue; Anderson	Picchiotti	4:07
17.	"Can't Get You Out of My Head" (music video)			3:50
18.	"In Your Eyes" (music video)			3:20
Total length:				67:55

Fever – Asian bonus AVCD disc
No.	Title	Writer(s)	Producer(s)	Length
1.	"Format data, not playable"			0:06
2.	"Can't Get You Out of My Head" (music video)			3:50
3.	"In Your Eyes" (music video)			3:19
4.	"Spinning Around" (music video)			3:30
5.	"On a Night Like This" (music video)			4:10
6.	"Can't Get You Out of My Head" (K & M's Mindprint Mix)			6:36
7.	"In Your Eyes" (Jean Jacques Smoothie Mix)			6:23
8.	"Spinning Around"			3:28
9.	"Boy"			3:50
10.	"Rendezvous at Sunset"	Minogue; Howes; Chapman; Gallagher; Harrington; Stannard	Stannard; Gallagher	3:24

Fever – Special edition bonus disc
No.	Title	Writer(s)	Producer(s)	Length
1.	"Can't Get Blue Monday Out of My Head"			4:03
2.	"Love at First Sight" (The Scumfrog's Beauty & the Beast Vocal Edit)			4:28
3.	"Can't Get You Out of My Head" (Deluxe's Dirty Dub)			6:52
4.	"In Your Eyes" (Roger Sanchez's Release the Dub Mix)			7:18
5.	"Love at First Sight" (Ruff & Jam US Radio Mix)			3:49
6.	"Come into My World" (Fischerspooner Mix)			4:20
7.	"Whenever You Feel Like It"	Minogue; Billy Steinberg; Rick Nowels	Nowels	4:05

Fever – Japanese special edition bonus disc bonus tracks
No.	Title	Writer(s)	Producer(s)	Length
8.	"Tightrope"	Minogue; Gabriel; Statham	Gabriel; Statham	4:29
9.	"Can't Get You Out of My Head" (K & M's Mindprint Mix)			6:35
10.	"In Your Eyes" (Jean Jacques Smoothie Mix)			6:21
11.	"Can't Get You Out of My Head" (music video)			3:50
12.	"In Your Eyes" (music video)			3:18
13.	"Love at First Sight" (music video)			3:58
14.	"Come into My World" (music video)			4:14

Fever – XXV Edition bonus disc
No.	Title	Writer(s)	Producer(s)	Length
1.	"Can't Get Blue Monday Out of My Head"			4:03
2.	"Boy"	Minogue; Gallagher; Stannard	Stannard; Gallagher	3:47
3.	"Rendezvous at Sunset"	Minogue; Howes; Chapman; Gallagher; Harrington; Stannard	Stannard; Gallagher	3:24
4.	"Tightrope"	Minogue; Gabriel; Statham	Gabriel; Statham	4:27
5.	"Good Like That"	Belmaati; Hansen; DioGuardi	Cutfather; Belmaati; DioGuardi	3:49
6.	"Harmony"	Minogue; Anderson	Anderson	4:15
7.	"Never Spoken"	Minogue; Anderson	Anderson	3:18
8.	"Baby"	Winstanley; Lodemal; Aass	Winstanley; Lodemal; Aass	3:49
9.	"In Your Eyes" (Roger Sanchez's Release the Dub Mix)			7:18
10.	"Love at First Sight" (Twin Master Plan Mix)			5:55
11.	"Come into My World" (Fischerspooner Mix)			4:20
Total length:				48:26

Notes

- "Come Into My World" is replaced by the radio edit version on all album pressings post-2002, including the "Special edition" and all digital and streaming formats.

== Personnel ==
Credits adapted from the liner notes of Fever.

=== Musicians ===
- Kylie Minogue – lead vocals (all tracks); backing vocals (tracks 1–6, 8–12)
- Ash Howes – programming (tracks 2, 8, 10); keyboards (track 2)
- Alvin Sweeney – programming (tracks 2, 8, 10)
- Martin Harrington – programming, guitars (tracks 2, 8); keyboards (track 2)
- Julian Gallagher – Rhodes (track 2); keyboards (tracks 8, 10)
- Rob Davis – keyboards, drum programming (tracks 3, 6, 7); electric guitar (track 3); guitars (tracks 6, 7)
- Greg Fitzgerald – keyboards, programming, guitar (tracks 4, 12)
- Phil Larsen – additional programming (track 6)
- Bruce Elliott-Smith – additional programming (track 6)
- Anders Kallmark – additional programming (track 6)
- Cathy Dennis – additional keyboards (track 7); backing vocals (tracks 3, 7, 9)
- Steve Lewinson – bass (track 8)
- Steve Anderson – arrangement, programming, keyboards (track 9)
- John Thirkell – flute, trumpet (track 9)
- Gavyn Wright – strings lead (track 9)
- Richard "Biff" Stannard – guitars (track 10); backing vocals (tracks 2, 8, 10)
- Billie Godfrey – backing vocals (track 4)
- Nat' B. – backing vocals (track 12)

=== Technical ===
- TommyD – production, mixing (track 1)
- Adrian Bushby – mixing (track 1)
- Richard "Biff" Stannard – production (tracks 2, 8, 10)
- Julian Gallagher – production (tracks 2, 8, 10)
- Ash Howes – recording, mixing (tracks 2, 8, 10)
- Alvin Sweeney – recording (tracks 2, 8, 10)
- Martin Harrington – recording (tracks 2, 8)
- Cathy Dennis – production (tracks 3, 7); mixing (track 7)
- Rob Davis – production (tracks 3, 6, 7); mixing, engineering (tracks 6, 7)
- Tim Orford – mix engineering (track 3)
- Greg Fitzgerald – production (tracks 4, 12)
- Mark Picchiotti – production, mix engineering (track 5)
- Tom Carlisle – mix engineering (track 5)
- Phil Larsen – mixing, engineering (tracks 6, 7)
- Bruce Elliott-Smith – mixing (tracks 6, 7)
- Anders Kallmark – engineering (tracks 6, 7)
- Steve Anderson – production (track 9)
- Paul Wright – engineering, mixing (track 9)
- Pascal Gabriel – production, mixing (track 11)
- Paul Statham – production (track 11)
- Tom Elmhirst – mixing (track 11)
- Tom Nichols – production (track 12)
- Geoff Pesche – mastering at The Town House, London

=== Artwork ===
- Vincent Peters – photography
- Adjective Noun – design
- Wendy Dougan – US design

== Charts ==
=== Weekly charts ===
2001–2002 weekly chart performance for Fever
Chart	Peak position
Australian Albums (ARIA)	1
Australian Dance Albums (ARIA)	1
Austrian Albums (Ö3 Austria)	1
Belgian Albums (Ultratop Flanders)	14
Belgian Albums (Ultratop Wallonia)	12
Canadian Albums (Billboard)	10
Danish Albums (Hitlisten)	4
Dutch Albums (Album Top 100)	7
European Top 100 Albums (Music & Media)	1
Finnish Albums (Suomen virallinen lista)	20
French Albums (SNEP)	21
German Albums (Offizielle Top 100)	1
Greek International Albums (IFPI)	2
Hungarian Albums (MAHASZ)	8
Icelandic Albums (Tónlist)	10
Irish Albums (IRMA)	1
Italian Albums (FIMI)	6
Japanese Albums (Oricon) Special edition	17
Japanese Albums (Oricon) Complete edition	122
New Zealand Albums (RMNZ)	3
Norwegian Albums (VG-lista)	4
Polish Albums (ZPAV)	12
Russian Albums (InterMedia)	1
Scottish Albums (Official Charts)	1
Singaporean Albums (RIAS)	10
Slovak Albums (IFPI)	8
South African Albums (RISA)	3
Spanish Albums (AFYVE)	9
Swedish Albums (Sverigetopplistan)	10
Swiss Albums (Schweizer Hitparade)	3
UK Albums (Official Charts)	1
US Billboard 200	3

2017–2021 weekly chart performance for Fever
Chart	Peak position
Australian Albums (ARIA)	6
Croatian Albums (HDU)	18
Scottish Albums (Official Charts)	7
Swiss Albums (Les charts Romandy)	31
UK Albums (Official Charts)	23
UK Vinyl Albums (OCC)	4

=== Monthly charts ===
2003 monthly chart performance for Fever
Chart	Position
Russian Albums (NFPF)	10

=== Year-end charts ===
2001 year-end chart performance for Fever
Chart	Position
Australian Albums (ARIA)	5
Australian Dance Albums (ARIA)	1
Austrian Albums (Ö3 Austria)	24
Danish Albums (Hitlisten)	61
Dutch Albums (Album Top 100)	62
European Top 100 Albums (Music & Media)	21
French Albums (SNEP)	143
German Albums (Offizielle Top 100)	26
Swedish Albums (Sverigetopplistan)	92
Swiss Albums (Schweizer Hitparade)	18
UK Albums (OCC)	10

2002 year-end chart performance for Fever
Chart	Position
Australian Albums (ARIA)	4
Australian Dance Albums (ARIA)	1
Austrian Albums (Ö3 Austria)	71
Belgian Albums (Ultratop Flanders)	67
Belgian Albums (Ultratop Wallonia)	64
Canadian Albums (Nielsen SoundScan)	24
Dutch Albums (Album Top 100)	47
European Top 100 Albums (Music & Media)	15
French Albums (SNEP)	55
German Albums (Offizielle Top 100)	50
New Zealand Albums (RMNZ)	30
Swiss Albums (Schweizer Hitparade)	41
UK Albums (OCC)	15
US Billboard 200	82
Worldwide Albums (IFPI)	30

2003 year-end chart performance for Fever
Chart	Position
Australian Albums (ARIA)	57
Australian Dance Albums (ARIA)	2
UK Albums (OCC)	196

=== Decade-end charts ===
2000s decade-end chart performance for Fever
Chart	Position
Australian Albums (ARIA)	13
UK Albums (OCC)	43

=== Centurial charts ===
21st century chart performance for Fever
Chart	Position
UK Female Albums (OCC)	25

== Certifications ==
Certifications and sales for Fever
Region	Certification	Certified units/sales
Argentina (CAPIF)	Gold	20,000^{^}
Australia (ARIA)	7× Platinum	490,000^{^}
Austria (IFPI Austria)	Platinum	40,000^{*}
Belgium (BRMA)	Gold	25,000^{*}
Canada (Music Canada)	2× Platinum	200,000^{^}
Denmark (IFPI Danmark)	Gold	25,000^{^}
France (SNEP)	Platinum	300,000^{*}
Germany (BVMI)	Platinum	300,000^{^}
Greece (IFPI Greece)	Gold	15,000^{^}
Hungary (MAHASZ)	Platinum	
Netherlands (NVPI)	Gold	40,000^{^}
New Zealand (RMNZ)	2× Platinum	30,000^{^}
Poland (ZPAV)	Gold	50,000^{*}
Russia (NFPF)	Diamond	60,000
South Africa (RISA)	Platinum	50,000^{*}
Spain (Promusicae)	2× Platinum	200,000^{^}
Sweden (GLF)	Platinum	80,000^{^}
Switzerland (IFPI Switzerland)	2× Platinum	80,000^{^}
United Kingdom (BPI)	5× Platinum	1,730,000
United States (RIAA)	Platinum	1,159,000
Summaries
Europe (IFPI)	3× Platinum	3,000,000^{*}
Worldwide	—	6,000,000
^{*} Sales figures based on certification alone.^{^} Shipments figures based on certification alone.

== Release history ==
Release dates and formats for Fever
Region	Date	Edition(s)	Format(s)	Label(s)	Ref.
United Kingdom	1 October 2001	Standard	Cassette; CD	Parlophone	
France	3 October 2001	Standard	CD	Parlophone	
Germany	5 October 2001	Standard	CD	EMI	
Australia	8 October 2001	Standard	Cassette; CD	Festival Mushroom	
Japan	11 October 2001	Standard	CD	Toshiba EMI	
United States	26 February 2002	Standard; limited	Cassette; CD	Capitol	
Japan	9 May 2002	Special	Enhanced CD	Toshiba EMI	
Australia	18 November 2002	Special	Double CD	Festival Mushroom	
Germany	18 November 2002	Special	Double CD	EMI	
Japan	16 January 2003	Complete	Double CD	Toshiba EMI	
Australia	15 October 2021	20th anniversary	Cassette	Warner Music Australia	
United Kingdom	15 October 2021	20th anniversary	Cassette	Rough Trade	
France	3 June 2022	20th anniversary	Vinyl	Warner Music	
Germany	10 June 2022	20th anniversary	Vinyl	Warner Music	
United Kingdom	10 June 2022	20th anniversary	Vinyl	Rough Trade	
Australia	17 June 2022	20th anniversary	Vinyl	Warner Music Australia	

== See also ==
- List of number-one hits of 2001 (Germany)
- List of European number-one hits of 2001
- List of number-one albums of 2001 in Australia
- List of top 25 albums for 2001 in Australia
- List of top 25 albums for 2002 in Australia
- List of UK Albums Chart number ones of the 2000s
- List of best-selling albums of the 2000s in Australia
- List of artists who have achieved simultaneous number-one UK Single and Album
- List of UK top-ten albums in 2002
- List of UK top-ten albums in 2001
