= Kylie Minogue videography =

Kylie Minogue video discography
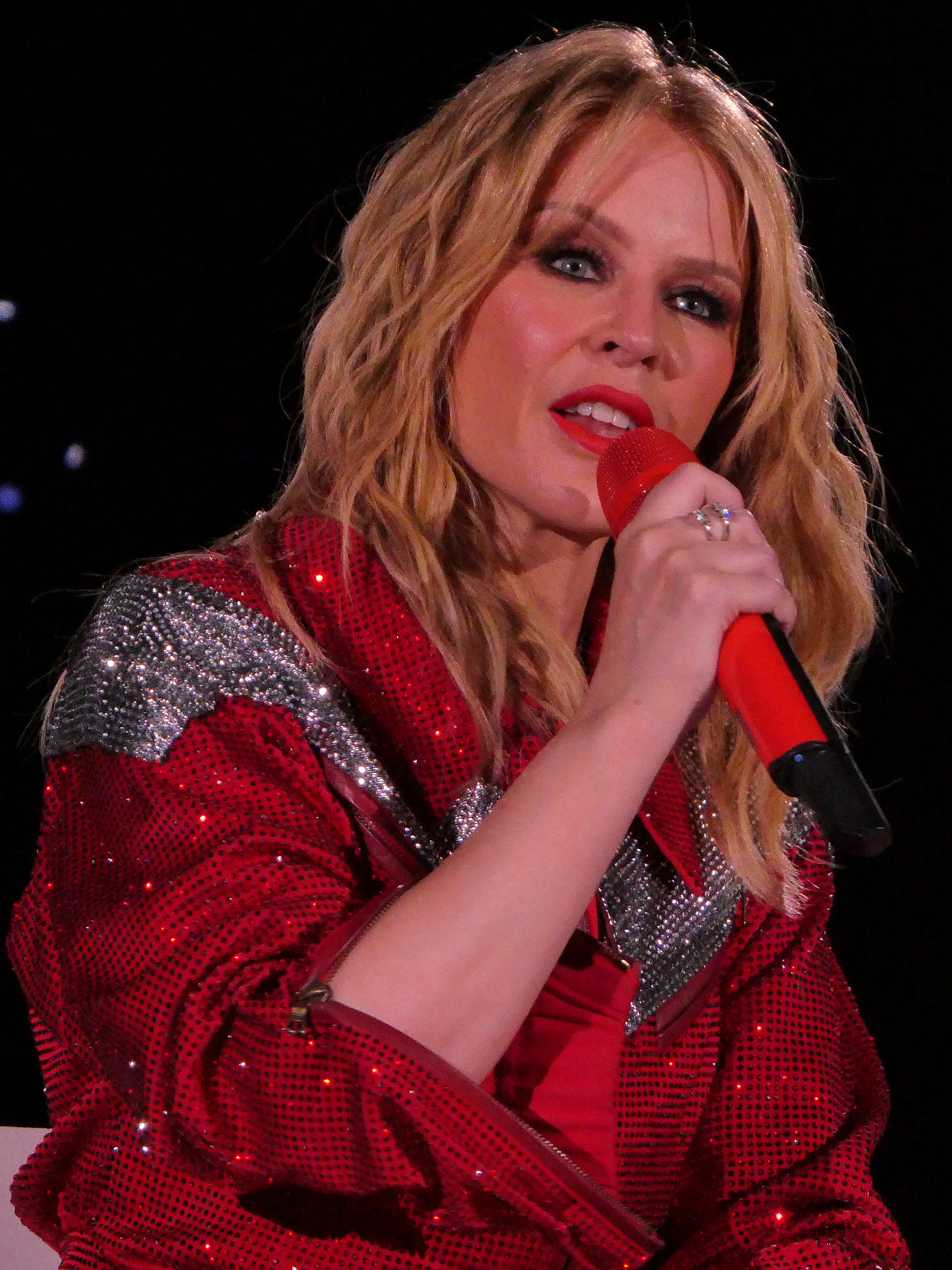
- Minogue performing on her Tension Tour in 2025.
- Music videos: 101
- Lyric videos: 26
- Visualisers: 63
- Concert films: 13
- Music video compilations: 13
- Documentaries: 2

Australian singer Kylie Minogue has been credited for one hundred one music videos, twenty-six lyric videos, sixty-three visualisers, thirteen concert films, thirteen music video compilations and two documentaries. From her eponymous debut studio album (1988), she released music videos for the singles "I Should Be So Lucky, "The Locomotion", "Got to Be Certain", "Je ne sais pas pourquoi", and "It's No Secret", all directed by Chris Langham and released from 1987 to 1988. She followed with two other music videos in 1988—"Made in Heaven" a b-side and "Especially for You" with Jason Donovan. In 1989, music videos for "Hand on Your Heart", "Wouldn't Change a Thing", "Never Too Late" and "Tears on My Pillow"—singles from her second studio album Enjoy Yourself (1989)

Minogue's third studio album Rhythm of Love (1990) spawned the single "Better the Devil You Know", whose music video was directed by Paul Goldman. It was followed by videos for "Step Back in Time" in 1990, and "What Do I Have to Do" and "Shocked" featuring Jazzy P in 1991. The fourth studio album Let's Get to It (1991) was preceded by the music video for the single "Word Is Out". Minogue further released one music video in 1991—"If You Were with Me Now" featuring Keith Washington, then two music videos in 1992 for Let's Get to It—"Give Me Just a Little More Time" and "Finer Feelings". In 1992, music videos from the singles Greatest Hits as such as "What Kind of Fool (Heard All That Before)" and "Celebration" were released as her final music videos from PWL Records.

Her self titled fifth album (1994) produced the 1994 music videos for "Confide in Me" and "Put Yourself in My Place", "Where Is the Feeling?" in 1995. Minogue released four music videos for her sixth studio album Impossible Princess (1997)—"Some Kind of Bliss", "Did It Again", "Breathe" and "Cowboy Style" which served as her final music videos from Deconstruction Records.

Minogue's seventh studio album, Light Years (2000), was supported by five music videos—"Spinning Around", "On a Night Like This", "Kids" featuring Robbie Williams, "Please Stay" and "Your Disco Needs You. In 2001, for her eighth studio album, Fever, she starred in the music video of "Can't Get You Out of My Head". The following year, "In Your Eyes", "Love at First Sight" and "Come into My World" had their respective music videos released. The music video for "Slow" was released in 2003, which led the album campaign for her ninth studio album Body Language (2003). Music videos for "Red Blooded Woman" and "Chocolate" followed the next year. Her greatest hits compilation album, Ultimate Kylie (2004) saw the release of the music videos for "I Believe in You" and "Giving You Up".

In 2007, Minogue made a comeback with the release of the music video for "2 Hearts", which acted as the first single from her tenth studio album X. For the lead single of her eleventh album Aphrodite (2010), Joseph Kahn was hired to direct the music video for "All the Lovers". Music videos for the subsequent singles "Get Outta My Way" and "Better than Today" were released in the same year. She also directed her own music videos, such as for "Better than Today" (2010) and "Flower" (2012). Her twelfth studio album Kiss Me Once (2014) spawned music videos for "Into the Blue", "Sexercize" and "I Was Gonna Cancel". In 2015, a music video for "Every Day's Like Christmas", a single from her thirteenth studio album Kylie Christmas served as her final music video release from Parlophone Records.

Under BMG Rights Management, Minogue enlisted Sophie Muller to direct several music videos for her fourteenth to seventeenth studio album – Golden, Disco, Tension and Tension II respectively, such as "Dancing", "Say Something", "Padam Padam" and "Lights Camera Action".

Minogue has also released lyric videos for singles such as "Put Your Hands Up (If You Feel Love)" (2011) and "A Lifetime to Repair" (2018); visualisers for songs such as "Things We Do for Love" (2023) and "Kiss Bang Bang" (2024); concert films such as Kiss Me Once Live at the SSE Hydro (2015) and Golden Live in Concert (2019); music video compilations through VHS, LaserDisc, DVD, Blu-ray, digital download and streaming; and the documentaries White Diamond: A Personal Portrait of Kylie Minogue (2007) and My Year as Aphrodite (2012).

== Music videos ==
Denotes music videos directed or co-directed by Kylie Minogue

=== 1980s ===
1980s music videos of Kylie Minogue
| Title | Year | Director(s) | Ref. |
|---|---|---|---|
| "The Locomotion" | 1987 | Chris Langman | |
| "I Should Be So Lucky" | 1987 | Chris Langman | |
| "Got to Be Certain" | 1988 | Chris Langman | |
| "Je ne sais pas pourquoi" | 1988 | Chris Langman | |
| "It's No Secret" | 1988 | Chris Langman | |
| "Especially for You" (with Jason Donovan) | 1988 | Chris Langman | |
| "Made in Heaven" | 1988 | Chris Langman | |
| "Hand on Your Heart" | 1989 | Chris Langman | |
| "Wouldn't Change a Thing" | 1989 | Pete Cornish | |
| "Never Too Late" | 1989 | Pete Cornish | |
| "Do They Know It's Christmas?" (amongst Band Aid II) | 1989 | | |
| "Tears on My Pillow" | 1989 | Pete Cornish | |

=== 1990s ===
1990s music videos of Kylie Minogue
| Title | Year | Director(s) | Ref. |
|---|---|---|---|
| "Better the Devil You Know" | 1990 | Paul Goldman | |
| "Step Back in Time" | 1990 | Nick Egan | |
| "What Do I Have to Do" | 1991 | Dave Hogan | |
| "Shocked (DNA Mix)" (featuring Jazzy P) | 1991 | Dave Hogan | |
| "Word Is Out" | 1991 | James Lebon | |
| "If You Were with Me Now" (with Keith Washington) | 1991 | Greg Masuak | |
| "Give Me Just a Little More Time" | 1992 | Greg Masuak | |
| "Finer Feelings" | 1992 | Dave Hogan | |
| "What Kind of Fool (Heard All That Before)" | 1992 | Greg Masuak | |
| "Celebration" | 1992 | Greg Masuak | |
| "Confide in Me" | 1994 | Paul Boyd | |
| "Put Yourself in My Place" | 1994 | Keir McFarlane | |
| "Where Is the Feeling?" (Brothers in Rhythm Remix) | 1995 | Keir McFarlane | |
| "Where the Wild Roses Grow" (with Nick Cave and the Bad Seeds) | 1995 | Rocky Schenck | |
| "Some Kind of Bliss" | 1997 | David Mould | |
| "Did It Again" | 1997 | Pedro Romhanyi | |
| "Breathe" | 1998 | Kieran Evans | |
| "Cowboy Style" | 1998 | Michael Williams | |
| "GBI (German Bold Italic)" (Towa Tei featuring Kylie Minogue) | 1998 | Stéphane Sednaoui | |

=== 2000s ===
2000s music videos of Kylie Minogue
| Title | Year | Director(s) | Ref. |
|---|---|---|---|
| "Spinning Around" | 2000 | Dawn Shadforth | |
| "On a Night Like This" | 2000 | Douglas Avery | |
| "Kids" (with Robbie Williams) | 2000 | Simon Hilton | |
| "Please Stay" | 2000 | James Frost, Alex Smith | |
| "Your Disco Needs You" | 2001 | Todd Cole | |
| "Can't Get You Out of My Head" | 2001 | Dawn Shadforth | |
| "In Your Eyes" | 2002 | Dawn Shadforth | |
| "Love at First Sight" | 2002 | Johan Renck | |
| "Come into My World" | 2002 | Michel Gondry | |
| "Slow" | 2003 | Baillie Walsh | |
| "Red Blooded Woman" | 2004 | Jake Nava | |
| "Chocolate" | 2004 | Dawn Shadforth | |
| "I Believe in You" | 2004 | Rafael Bonachela | |
| "Giving You Up" | 2005 | Alex Courtès, Martin Fougerol | |
| "2 Hearts" | 2007 | Dawn Shadforth | |
| "Wow" | 2008 | Melina Matsoukas | |
| "In My Arms" | 2008 | Melina Matsoukas | |
| "All I See" | 2008 | William Baker | |
| "The One" | 2008 | Ben Ib | |

=== 2010s ===
2010s music videos of Kylie Minogue
| Title | Year | Director(s) | Ref. |
|---|---|---|---|
| "Everybody Hurts" (amongst Helping Haiti) | 2010 | | |
| "All the Lovers" | 2010 | Joseph Kahn | |
| "Get Outta My Way" | 2010 | AlexandLiane | |
| "Higher" (Taio Cruz featuring Kylie Minogue) | 2010 | Alex Herron | |
| "Better than Today" | 2010 | William Baker, Kylie Minogue | |
| "Santa Baby" | 2010 | Alasdair McLellan | |
| "Timebomb" | 2012 | Christian Larson | |
| "Flower" | 2012 | Kylie Minogue | |
| "Limpido" (Laura Pausini featuring Kylie Minogue) | 2013 | Gaetano Morbioli | |
| "Into the Blue" | 2014 | Dawn Shadforth | |
| "Sexercize" | 2014 | Roman Coppola, Will Davidson | |
| "I Was Gonna Cancel" | 2014 | Dimitri Basil | |
| "Crystallize" | 2014 | Alice Moitié | |
| "Sleepwalker" | 2014 | William Baker | |
| "God Only Knows" (amongst BBC Music and Friends) | 2014 | François Rousselet | |
| "Right Here, Right Now" (Giorgio Moroder featuring Kylie Minogue) | 2015 | Daniel Börjesson | |
| "Absolutely Anything and Anything at All" | 2015 | Bill Jones, Ben Timlett | |
| "Black and White" (featuring Fernando Garibay and Shaggy) | 2015 | Katerina Jebb | |
| "The Other Boys" (Nervo featuring Kylie Minogue, Jake Shears, and Nile Rodgers) | 2015 | Hannu Aukia | |
| "It's the Most Wonderful Time of the Year" | 2015 | | |
| "100 Degrees" (with Dannii Minogue) | 2015 | | |
| "2000 Miles" | 2015 | | |
| "Christmas Isn't Christmas 'Til You Get Here" | 2015 | | |
| "I'm Gonna Be Warm This Winter" | 2015 | | |
| "Oh Santa" | 2015 | | |
| "Every Day's Like Christmas" | 2015 | David Lopez-Edwards | |
| "Dancing" | 2018 | Sophie Muller | |
| "Stop Me from Falling" | 2018 | Colin Solal Cardo | |
| "Stop Me from Falling" (featuring Gente de Zona) | 2018 | Sophie Muller | |
| "Golden" | 2018 | Sophie Muller | |
| "Music's Too Sad Without You" (featuring Jack Savoretti) | 2018 | Joe Connor | |
| "New York City" | 2019 | Blue Leach, Rob Sinclair | |
| "Really Don't Like U" (with Tove Lo) | 2019 | Natalie O'Moore, Thomas English | |

=== 2020s ===
2020s music videos of Kylie Minogue
| Title | Year | Director(s) | Ref. |
|---|---|---|---|
| "Say Something" | 2020 | Sophie Muller | |
| "Magic" | 2020 | Sophie Muller | |
| "Stop Crying Your Heart Out" (amongst BBC Radio 2 All Stars) | 2020 | | |
| "A Second to Midnight" (with Years & Years) | 2021 | Sophie Muller | |
| "Kiss of Life" (with Jessie Ware) | 2021 | Sophie Muller | |
| "Can't Stop Writing Songs About You" (with Gloria Gaynor) | 2022 | Sophie Muller | |
| "Miss a Thing" | 2022 | Sophie Muller | |
| "Padam Padam" | 2023 | Sophie Muller | |
| "Tension" | 2023 | Sophie Muller | |
| "Dance Alone" (with Sia) | 2024 | Dano Cerny | |
| "My Oh My" (with Bebe Rexha and Tove Lo) | 2024 | Charlie Di Placido | |
| "Edge of Saturday Night" (with The Blessed Madonna) | 2024 | Sophie Muller | |
| "Lights Camera Action" | 2024 | Sophie Muller | |
| "Last Night I Dreamt I Fell in Love" (with Alok) | 2025 | | |
| "Office Party" | 2025 | | |
| "Hot in December" | 2025 | | |
| "XMAS" | 2025 | Sophie Muller | |
| "These Alarms" (with Snow Patrol) | 2026 | | |

== Lyric videos ==
Kylie Minogue lyric videos
| Title | Release date | Ref. |
|---|---|---|
| "Higher" (Taio Cruz featuring Kylie Minogue) | 1 November 2010 | |
| "Put Your Hands Up" | 23 March 2011 | |
| "Skirt" | 14 June 2013 | |
| "Limpido" (Laura Pausini featuring Kylie Minogue) | 10 September 2013 | |
| "Into the Blue" | 27 January 2014 | |
| "I Was Gonna Cancel" | 9 April 2014 | |
| "Only You" (with James Corden) | 9 November 2015 | |
| "A Lifetime to Repair" | 16 August 2018 | |
| "What You Waiting For" (Sigala featuring Kylie Minogue) | 28 September 2018 | |
| "On oublie le reste" (with Jenifer) | 16 October 2019 | |
| "Say Something" | 24 July 2020 | |
| "Starstruck" (Years & Years featuring Kylie Minogue) | 21 May 2021 | |
| "10 Out of 10" (Oliver Heldens featuring Kylie Minogue) | 5 April 2023 | |
| "Tension" | 19 September 2023 | |
| "Hands" | 22 September 2023 | |
| "One More Time" | 22 September 2023 | |
| "Vegas High" | 22 September 2023 | |
| "Hold on to Now" | 22 September 2023 | |
| "Dance Alone" (with Sia) | 7 February 2024 | |
| "Midnight Ride" (with Orville Peck and Diplo) | 7 June 2024 | |
| "My Oh My" (with Bebe Rexha and Tove Lo) | 20 July 2024 | |
| "Edge of Saturday Night" (with The Blessed Madonna) | 15 August 2024 | |
| "Lights Camera Action" | 4 October 2024 | |
| "Story" | 22 May 2026 | |
| "Love Sensation" (Afterhours Mix, with Madonna) | 7 August 2026 | |
| "Love Sensation" (Afterhours Radio Edit, with Madonna) | 13 August 2026 | |

== Visualisers ==
Kylie Minogue visualisers
| Title | Release date | Ref. |
|---|---|---|
| "Padam Padam" (Absolute Padam All Weekend Remix Edit) | 18 July 2023 | |
| "Story" | 22 September 2023 | |
| "10 Out of 10" (Oliver Heldens featuring Kylie Minogue) | 22 September 2023 | |
| "Green Light" | 22 September 2023 | |
| "Things We Do for Love" | 22 September 2023 | |
| "You Still Get Me High" | 22 September 2023 | |
| "My Oh My" (with Bebe Rexha & Tove Lo) | 11 July 2024 | |
| "Lights Camera Action" (Confidence Man Remix) | 28 September 2024 | |
| "Lights Camera Action" (Zach Witness Remix) | 28 September 2024 | |
| "Lights Camera Action" (Jaconda Remix) | 28 September 2024 | |
| "Lights Camera Action" (Extended Mix) | 28 September 2024 | |
| "Kiss Bang Bang" | 18 October 2024 | |
| "Dance to the Music" | 18 October 2024 | |
| "Hello" | 18 October 2024 | |
| "Shoulda Left Ya" | 18 October 2024 | |
| "Taboo" | 18 October 2024 | |
| "Someone for Me" | 18 October 2024 | |
| "Good As Gone" | 18 October 2024 | |
| "Diamonds" | 18 October 2024 | |
| "Someone for Me" (with YouNotUs) | 20 January 2025 | |
| "Last Night I Dreamt I Fell in Love" (with Alok) | 15 February 2025 | |
| "Lights Camera Action" (intro; Live from the Tension Tour) | 26 September 2025 | |
| "Lights Camera Action" (Live from the Tension Tour) | 26 September 2025 | |
| "In Your Eyes" (Live from the Tension Tour) | 26 September 2025 | |
| "Get Outta My Way" (Live from the Tension Tour) | 26 September 2025 | |
| "What Do I Have to Do" (Live from the Tension Tour) | 26 September 2025 | |
| "Come into My World" (Live from the Tension Tour) | 26 September 2025 | |
| "Good as Gone" (Live from the Tension Tour) | 26 September 2025 | |
| "Spinning Around" (Live from the Tension Tour) | 26 September 2025 | |
| "Taboo" / "On a Night Like This" (Live from the Tension Tour) | 26 September 2025 | |
| "Last Night I Dreamt I Fell in Love" (Live from the Tension Tour) | 26 September 2025 | |
| "Better the Devil You Know" (Live from the Tension Tour) | 26 September 2025 | |
| "Shocked" (Live from the Tension Tour) | 26 September 2025 | |
| "Dancing" (Live from the Tension Tour) | 26 September 2025 | |
| "Things We Do for Love" (Live from the Tension Tour) | 26 September 2025 | |
| "The Loco-Motion" (Live from the Tension Tour) | 26 September 2025 | |
| "Hold on to Now" (Live from the Tension Tour) | 26 September 2025 | |
| "Say Something" (Live from the Tension Tour) | 26 September 2025 | |
| "Supernova" (Live from the Tension Tour) | 26 September 2025 | |
| "Real Groove" (Live from the Tension Tour) | 26 September 2025 | |
| "Magic" (Live from the Tension Tour) | 26 September 2025 | |
| "Where Does the DJ Go?" (Live from the Tension Tour) | 26 September 2025 | |
| "Last Night a D.J. Saved My Life" (Live from the Tension Tour) | 26 September 2025 | |
| "Confide in Me" (Live from the Tension Tour) | 26 September 2025 | |
| "Slow" (Live from the Tension Tour) | 26 September 2025 | |
| "Timebomb" (Live from the Tension Tour) | 26 September 2025 | |
| "Edge of Saturday Night" (Live from the Tension Tour) | 26 September 2025 | |
| "Tension" (Live from the Tension Tour) | 26 September 2025 | |
| "Can't Get You Out of My Head" (Live from the Tension Tour) | 26 September 2025 | |
| "All the Lovers" (Live from the Tension Tour) | 26 September 2025 | |
| "Padam Padam" (Live from the Tension Tour) | 26 September 2025 | |
| "In My Arms" (Live from the Tension Tour) | 26 September 2025 | |
| "Love at First Sight" (Live from the Tension Tour) | 26 September 2025 | |
| "Santa Claus is Coming to Town" (featuring Frank Sinatra) | 5 December 2025 | |
| "At Christmas" | 5 December 2025 | |
| "100 Degrees" (with Dannii Minogue) | 5 December 2025 | |
| "Santa Baby" | 5 December 2025 | |
| "Christmas Isn't Christmas 'Til You Get Here" | 5 December 2025 | |
| "White December" | 5 December 2025 | |
| "It's the Most Wonderful Time of the Year" | 5 December 2025 | |
| "Let It Snow" | 5 December 2025 | |
| "Have Yourself a Merry Little Christmas" | 5 December 2025 | |
| "Hot in December" | 10 December 2025 | |

== Concert films ==
Kylie Minogue concert films
| Title | Details | Certifications |
|---|---|---|
| On the Go – Live in Japan | Released: 8 April 1990; Label: Video Collection International; Formats: VHS, LaserDisc; Minogue's performance in Japan during her 1989 Disco in Dream tour and backstage footage. | |
| Live! | Released: 9 April 1992; Label: Picture Music International; Formats: DVD; Minogue's performance in Dublin, Ireland during her 1991 Let's Get to It Tour and backstage footage. | |
| Live in Sydney | Released: 1 October 2001; Label: Rhino Entertainment; Formats: DVD; Minogue's performance in Sydney, Australia during her 2001 On a Night Like This tour and backstage footage. | AUS: 3× Platinum; UK: 2× Platinum |
| Intimate and Live | Released: 23 July 2002; Label: Warner Vision; Formats: DVD; Minogue's performance in Australia during her 1998 Intimate and Live.; Charts: Number one in Australia | AUS: Platinum |
| KylieFever2002: Live in Manchester | Released: 18 November 2002; Label: EMI; Formats: VHS, DVD; Minogue's performance in Manchester, England during her KylieFever2002 tour.; Backstage footage, photo gallery, virtual tour programme and backdrop projections for "Cowboy Style", "Light Years" / "I Feel Love", "I Should Be So Lucky" and "Burning Up".; Limited edition featured deluxe packaging and bonus live CD; Charts: Number one in Australia, number two in the United Kingdom and number sixteen in the United States. | AUS: 2× Platinum; UK: 2× Platinum |
| Body Language Live | Released: 12 July 2004; Label: Parlophone; Formats: DVD; Minogue's performance in London, England during her 2003 Money Can't Buy concert.; Multi-angle visuals for "Slow" and "Chocolate", backstage footage and DVD-ROM section with gallery, wallpapers and screensavers.; Charts: Number three in the UK | AUS: Platinum; UK: Gold |
| Showgirl | Released: 28 November 2005; Label: EMI; Formats: DVD; Minogue's performance in London, England during her 2005 Showgirl: The Greatest Hits Tour.; Backstage footage, showgirl screen visuals and DVD-ROM section.; Charts: Number one in Australia, number two in the UK | AUS: 4× Platinum, UK: 2× Platinum |
| White Diamond / Showgirl: Homecoming | Released: 10 December 2007; Label: EMI; Formats: DVD; Minogue's performance in Melbourne, Australia during her 2007 Showgirl: The Homecoming Tour and backstage footage. | UK: Gold |
| KylieX2008 | Released: 1 December 2008; Label: FremantleMedia; Formats: DVD, Blu-ray; Minogue's performance in London, England during her KylieX2008 tour.; Backstage footage, screen visuals, projections and a photo gallery. | UK: Gold |
| Aphrodite Les Folies – Live in London | Released: 28 November 2011; Label: Parlophone; Formats: DVD, Blu-ray; Minogue's performance in London, England during her 2011 Aphrodite: Les Folies Tour.; Backstage footage, screen visuals and projections. | |
| Kiss Me Once Live at the SSE Hydro | Released: 23 March 2015; Label: Parlophone; Formats: DVD, Blu-ray; Minogue's performance in Glasgow, Scotland during her 2014 Kiss Me Once Tour.; Charts: Number one in Australia, number thirty-seven in United States | |
| A Kylie Christmas – Live from the Royal Albert Hall 2015 | Released: 25 November 2016; Label: Parlophone; Formats: Digital download, streaming; Minogue's performance in London, England during her 2015 A Kylie Christmas concert. | |
| Golden Live in Concert | Released: 6 December 2019; Label: BMG Rights Management; Formats: DVD, streaming; Minogue's performance during her Minogue's Golden Tour. | |

== Music video compilations ==
Kylie Minogue music video compilations
| Title | Details | Certifications |
|---|---|---|
| The Videos | Released: November 1988; Label: PWL; Formats: VHS; Contained music videos from Minogue's debut album, Kylie. | |
| The Kylie Collection | Released: February 1989; Label: Mushroom; Formats: VHS; Australia release. Contained music videos from Minogue's studio album, Kylie. | |
| The Videos 2 | Released: November 1989; Label: PWL; Formats: VHS; Contained music videos from Minogue's studio album, Enjoy Yourself. | |
| Let's Get to...the Videos | Released: November 1991; Label: PWL; Formats: VHS; Contained music videos from Minogue's studio album Rhythm of Love and two from her studio album, Let's Get to It. | |
| Greatest Video Hits | Released: August 1992; Label: PWL; Formats: VHS, LaserDisc; Contained music videos for the songs featured on Minogue's compilation album Greatest Hits. The Australian release included the music video for "Celebration". | |
| The Kylie Tapes: 94–98 | Released: 1998; Label: Warner Music Vision; Formats: VHS; Australia release. Contained the music videos from Minogue's studio albums, Kylie Minogue (1994) and Impossible Princess (1998). | |
| Greatest Hits | Released: 18 November 2002; Label: PWL; Formats: DVD; Special features: Photo gallery, alternate videos; UK release. Contained music videos for the songs featured on the compilation album Greatest Hits.; Includes the alternate version of many of Minogue's music videos. Behind-the-features were taken from The Kylie Collection, The Videos 2 and Let's Get to... the Videos.; Charted at number nine in the UK. | UK: Gold |
| Greatest Hits 87–97 | Released: 19 November 2003; Label: PWL, BMG; Formats: DVD; Contained music videos for the songs featured on the compilation album Greatest Hits 87–97. | |
| Greatest Hits: 87–99 | Released: 24 November 2003; Label: Festival Mushroom; Formats: DVD; Australia release. Contained music videos for the songs featured on the compilation album Greatest Hits: 87–99. | AUS: 2× Platinum |
| Kylie Minogue: Artist Collection | Released: 20 September 2004; Label: BMG International; Formats: DVD; Contained music videos for the songs featured on the compilation album Kylie Minogue: Artist Collection. | |
| Ultimate Kylie | Released: 22 November 2004; Label: Parlophone; Formats: DVD; Includes lyrics and Minogue's Brit Awards 2002 performance of "Can't Get You Out of My Head".; Contained music videos for the songs featured on the compilation album Ultimate Kylie. | AUS: 3× Platinum; UK: 2× Platinum; FRA: Gold |
| Hits | Released: 16 March 2011; Label: EMI Music Japan; Formats: DVD; Second disc of the compilation album, Hits contained thirteen music videos. | |
| The Best of Kylie Minogue | Released: 28 May 2012; Label: EMI; Formats: DVD; Second disc contained music videos for the songs featured on the compilation album The Best of Kylie Minogue. | |

== Documentaries ==
Kylie Minogue documentaries
| Title | Details |
|---|---|
| White Diamond: A Personal Portrait of Kylie Minogue | Released: 16 October 2007; Distributed by EMI Records Ltd. and FremantleMedia. A documentary DVD featuring Minogue before and during Showgirl: The Homecoming Tour originally abandoned halfway through its original 2005 run, in Sydney, when Minogue was diagnosed with breast cancer. |
| My Year as Aphrodite | Released: 14 August 2012; A television documentary special following Minogue, the cast and crew of Aphrodite: Les Folies Tour. From the conceptualization of the tour, right through rehearsals and their six months on the road. It aired on Sky Living on 14 August 2012. |
