= A Wonderful World (Susan Boyle album) =

Studio album by Susan Boyle
- Released: 4 November 2016
- Recorded: March–September 2016
- Genre: Operatic pop, crossover, easy listening
- Length: 36:59
- Label: Syco; Columbia; Sony Music
- Producer: Steve Anderson and Cliff Masterson

Susan Boyle chronology
Hope (2014)	A Wonderful World (2016)	Ten (2019)

Professional ratings
Review scores
Source	Rating
Allmusic	3.0/5 stars

A Wonderful World is the seventh studio album by Scottish singer Susan Boyle. It was released on 4 November 2016 by Syco Music and Columbia Records.

== Background ==
Following the release of her previous album, Hope in 2014, Susan Boyle took a break during 2015 to "take a little me time and spend time at home with family and friends", and thus the recording of her seventh studio album was postponed to 2016.

In October 2016, Susan Boyle announced the release of A Wonderful World. Boyle said of the album: "I wanted to create an album that families could enjoy, something for everyone, an album that can be played all year and evoke memories. Anyone who knows me knows I’m a huge Madonna fan and to be able to perform ‘Like A Prayer’ was a real highlight".

The album features a "virtual duet" with late singer Nat King Cole.

== Commercial performance ==
The album debuted at number 150 on the Billboard 200 in the United States, with first-week sales of 5,000 units. In the United Kingdom, A Wonderful World debuted at number 22 on the UK Albums Chart, selling 15,013 copies and becoming Susan Boyle's lowest-charting album in the UK.

== Track listing ==
No.	Title	Writer(s)	Length
1.	"What a Wonderful World"	Bob Thiele; George David Weiss	3:40
2.	"When I Fall in Love" (with Nat King Cole)	Victor Young; Edward Heyman	3:07
3.	"Angels"	Robbie Williams; Guy Chambers	3:57
4.	"Somewhere Out There" (with Michael Bolton)	James Horner; Barry Mann; Cynthia Weil	3:34
5.	"I Have a Dream"	Benny Andersson; Björn Ulvaeus	4:09
6.	"Always on My Mind"	Wayne Carson; Johnny Christopher; Mark James	4:06
7.	"May You Never Be Alone"	Patrick Mascall; Nell Bryden	3:51
8.	"Mull of Kintyre"	Paul McCartney; Denny Laine	3:38
9.	"Like a Prayer"	Madonna; Patrick Leonard	3:22
10.	"When You Wish upon a Star"	Leigh Harline; Ned Washington	3:35
Total length:			36:59

== Charts ==
Chart (2016–17)	Peak position
Australian Albums (ARIA)	14
Belgian Albums (Ultratop Flanders)	92
Belgian Albums (Ultratop Wallonia)	188
Irish Albums (IRMA)	35
New Zealand Albums (RMNZ)	8
Scottish Albums (OCC)	7
UK Albums (OCC)	22
US Billboard 200	150

== Certifications ==
Region	Certification	Certified units/sales
United Kingdom (BPI)	Silver	60,000^{‡}
^{‡} Sales+streaming figures based on certification alone.

== Release history ==
Region	Date	Format	Label
United States	4 November 2016	CD, digital download	Syco Music; Columbia
United Kingdom	25 November 2016	CD, digital download	Syco Music; Sony Music
