= A Kylie Christmas (concert series) =

2015-16 series of concerts by Kylie Minogue

- Promotional concert by Kylie Minogue
- 2015 promotional poster
- Location: London, England
- Venue: Royal Albert Hall
- Associated albums: Kylie Christmas
- Start date: 11 December 2015
- End date: 10 December 2016
- No. of shows: 3

Kylie Minogue concert chronology
- Summer 2015 (2015); A Kylie Christmas (2015–16); Kylie Presents Golden (2018)

A Kylie Christmas is a series of Christmas concerts performed by Australian singer-songwriter Kylie Minogue at the Royal Albert Hall in London, in support of her thirteenth studio album Kylie Christmas (2015). In 2015, the show was held on 11 December, and two dates were held on 9 December 2016 and 10 December 2016. Minogue performed mainly songs from her album Kylie Christmas and its reissue, but included some of her previous hits.

== Set list ==
2015 show

Act 1

1. "Overture" (Instrumental Intro) (contains elements of "Let It Snow", "Only You", "Spinning Around" and "All the Lovers")
2. "It's the Most Wonderful Time of the Year"
3. "I'm Gonna Be Warm This Winter"
4. "Santa Claus Is Coming to Town"
5. "Oh Santa"
6. "Christmas Wrapping"
7. "Wow"
8. "Winter Wonderland"
9. "Every Day's Like Christmas"

Act 2

10. "Can't Get You Out of My Head"
11. "2000 Miles" (with Chrissie Hynde)
12. "Christmas Isn't Christmas 'Til You Get Here"

Act 3

13. "On a Night Like This"
14. "100 Degrees" (with Dannii Minogue)
15. "Spinning Around"
16. "Your Disco Needs You"

Act 4

17. "Santa Baby"
18. "Let It Snow"
19. "The Twelve Days of Christmas" (Impromptu with the audience)
20. "The Loco-Motion" (The Abbey Road Sessions version)

Act 5

21. "White Diamond Theme" (Interlude)
22. "I Believe in You" (The Abbey Road Sessions version)
23. "Only You"
24. "Love at First Sight"
25. "All the Lovers"
26. "Celebration"

Encore

27. "Especially for You"
28. "I Wish It Could Be Christmas Everyday"

2016 shows

Act 1

1. "Overture" (Instrumental Intro) (contains elements of "Let It Snow", "Only You", "Spinning Around" and "All the Lovers")
2. "It's the Most Wonderful Time of the Year"
3. "Wonderful Christmastime"
4. "Santa Claus Is Coming to Town"
5. "Christmas Wrapping"
6. "At Christmas"

Act 2

7. "Come into My World"
8. "Confide in Me" (with John Grant)
9. "The One"

Act 3

10. "Better the Devil You Know" (with Olly Alexander)
11. "Celebration"
12. "Stay Another Day" (Note: "Stay Another Day" was performed only at 9 December show in 2016)

Act 4

13. "Your Disco Needs You" (with Katherine Jenkins)
14. "100 Degrees"
15. "Spinning Around"
16. "Christmas Lights"

Act 5

17. "The Locomotion" (Showgirl version)
18. "Let It Snow"
19. "Santa Baby"
20. "Can't Get You Out of My Head"
21. "Night Fever"
22. "Everybody's Free (To Feel Good)"
23. "Love at First Sight"
24. "All the Lovers"

Encore

25. "Silent Night"
26. "Especially For You"
27. "I Wish It Could Be Christmas Everyday"

== Show dates ==
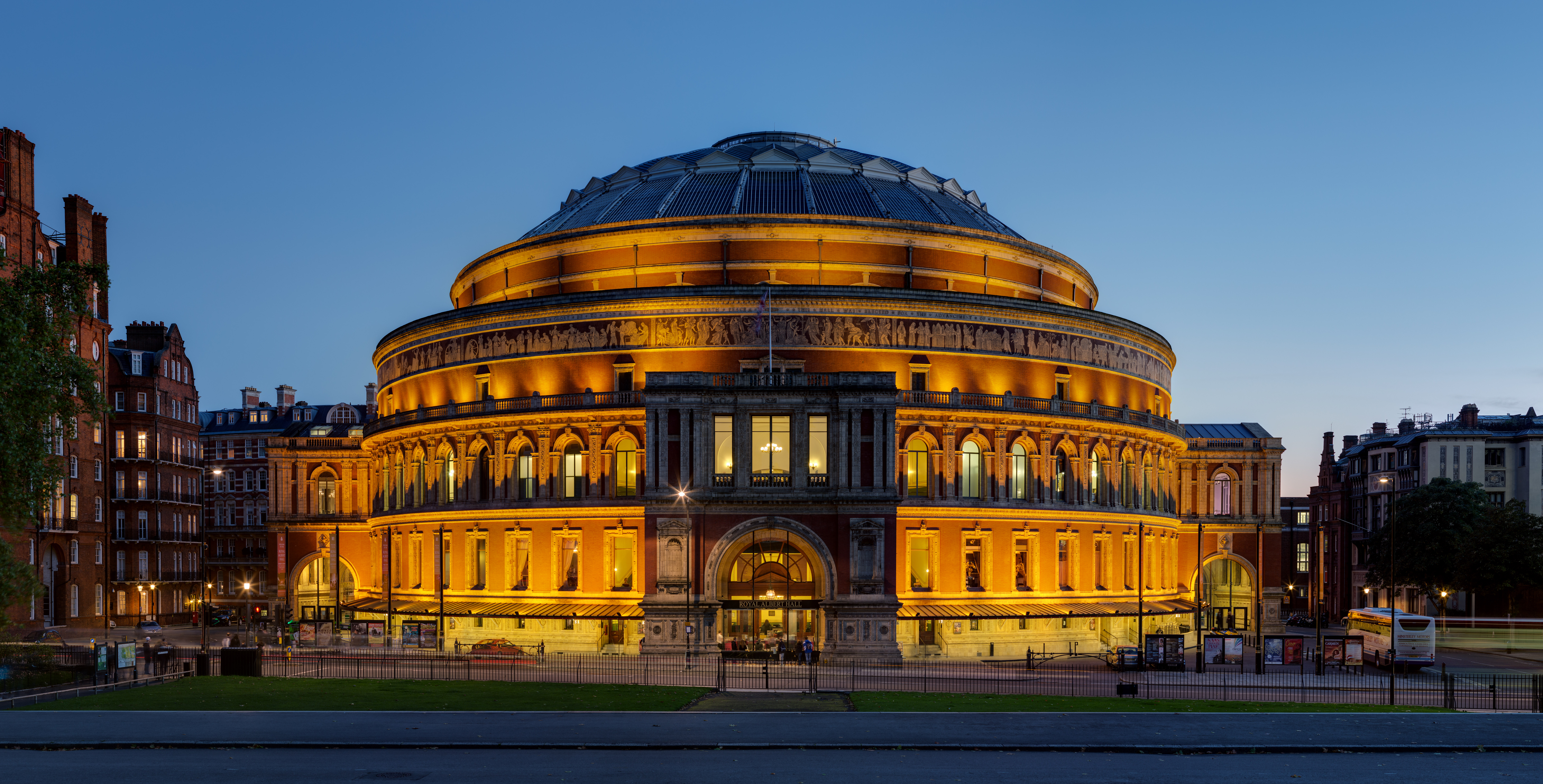
The concerts were held in London's Royal Albert Hall.

Date	City	Country	Venue
11 December 2015	London	England	Royal Albert Hall
9 December 2016	London	England	Royal Albert Hall
10 December 2016	London	England	Royal Albert Hall

== A Kylie Christmas – Live from the Royal Albert Hall 2015 ==
A Kylie Christmas – Live from the Royal Albert Hall 2015

Video by Kylie Minogue
- Released: 17 December 2015 (Sky Arts); 25 November 2016 (iTunes)
- Recorded: 11 December 2015
- Venues: Royal Albert Hall (London, England)
- Genres: Christmas; traditional pop
- Length: 89:00
- Label: Parlophone

Kylie Minogue video chronology
Kiss Me Once Live at the SSE Hydro (2015)	A Kylie Christmas – Live from the Royal Albert Hall 2015 (2015–16)	Golden Live in Concert (2019)

A Kylie Christmas – Live from the Royal Albert Hall 2015 is the 12th concert film released by Australian artist Kylie Minogue. The concert was filmed at Royal Albert Hall in London, while the programme was commissioned by Sky Arts and directed by Paul Dugdale.

The television special was first broadcast on Sky Arts on 17 December 2015 and was then shown on Sky One on Christmas Day. The film was released via iTunes and Apple Music on 25 November 2016 to coincide with the release of Kylie Christmas: Snow Queen Edition.

=== Track listing ===
No.	Title	Length
1.	"Overture"
2.	"It's the Most Wonderful Time of the Year"
3.	"I'm Gonna Be Warm This Winter"
4.	"Santa Claus Is Coming to Town"
5.	"Christmas Wrapping"
6.	"Wow"
7.	"Every Day's Like Christmas"
8.	"Can't Get You Out of My Head"
9.	"2000 Miles" (With Chrissie Hynde)
10.	"Christmas Isn't Christmas 'Til You Get Here"
11.	"On a Night Like This"
12.	"100 Degrees" (With Dannii Minogue)
13.	"Your Disco Needs You"
14.	"Santa Baby"
15.	"Let It Snow"
16.	"The Locomotion"
17.	"White Diamond Theme" (Interlude)
18.	"I Believe in You"
19.	"Only You"
20.	"All the Lovers"
21.	"Celebration"
22.	"Especially For You"
23.	"I Wish It Could Be Christmas Everyday"
Total length:		89:00
