= The Best of Kylie Minogue =

2012 album by Kylie Minogue

Greatest hits album by Kylie Minogue
- Released: 28 May 2012
- Recorded: 1987–2010
- Studio: Various
- Genre: Pop; dance-pop
- Length: 74:45
- Label: EMI
- Producer: Babydaddy; Brothers in Rhythm; Guy Chambers; Ian Curnow; Cutfather; Daniel Davidsen; Rob Davis; Cathy Dennis; Johnny Douglas; Jim Eliot; Julian Gallagher; Phil Harding; Calvin Harris; Greg Kurstin; Steve Power; Stuart Price; Lucas Secon; Damon Sharpe; Jake Shears; Mike Spencer; Graham Stack; Richard "Biff" Stannard; Stock Aitken Waterman; Sunnyroads; Mark Taylor; Peter Wallevik

Kylie Minogue chronology
| Aphrodite Les Folies – Live in London (2011) | The Best of Kylie Minogue (2012) | The Abbey Road Sessions (2012) |

The Best of Kylie Minogue is a 2012 greatest hits album by Australian recording artist Kylie Minogue. It was released on 28 May 2012 by EMI to commemorate the twenty-fifth anniversary of Minogue's recording career, as part of her K25 celebrations. It follows the previous major compilation albums Greatest Hits (1992) and Ultimate Kylie (2004). It is also Minogue's only major compilation not to include any new material or to include unreleased and rare material. The album consists of Minogue's major hits, spanning from her 1987 debut to her 2010 album project Aphrodite.

Upon its release, the compilation was well received by most music critics, many praising the later releases of Minogue's catalog, while it was criticised for not including most of her hit songs from the initial phase of her career. It peaked at number 11 in the United Kingdom, while charting inside the top forty in the Czech Republic, Ireland, Scotland and Spain.

This compilation was superseded by 2019's Step Back in Time: The Definitive Collection with all its twenty-one tracks being included on that 2-CD set.

== Background ==
The Best of Kylie Minogue is the first major greatest hits album by Minogue since her 2004 Ultimate Kylie album. During 2012, Minogue had celebrated her twenty-fifth anniversary of her record career, which was dubbed "K25 Celebration". Each month, Minogue would present a special gift to her fans to thank them for their support during her 25-year recording career. She would ask fans every month to "tweet to unlock" the special gift, and she would regularly receive more than 25,000 tweets. To celebrate the first month of K25, Minogue released an orchestral version of her single "Finer Feelings" and embarked on the Anti Tour, which featured b-sides, demos and rarities from her music catalogue.

According to a press release, the songs selected for The Best of Kylie Minogue were chosen by "fans through extensive market research conducted by EMI late last year." The cover art of The Best of Kylie Minogue contains badges representing each of the singles. It also has pictures from two music videos; "Spinning Around" and "Confide in Me". The back cover featured logos of the hits. In the booklet, the cover of the singles are included. An alternate cover was made for a deluxe edition for iTunes. The same picture with a pink border and text.

The Best of Kylie Minogue was one of four musical releases within her K25 celebration. The first being her CD single release of "Timebomb", the second being this release, the third being her orchestral compilation album The Abbey Road Sessions and her final being her K25: Time Capsule box set.

== Material and release ==
The release was only one disc but saw singles included from various parts of her discography. Two songs from her debut album Kylie were featured; "I Should Be So Lucky" and "The Loco-Motion". Two songs from her second album were featured, these being "Tears on My Pillow" and "Never Too Late". One song from her third studio album was "Better the Devil You Know", one song from her fourth album was "Give Me Just a Little More Time" and one from her fifth studio album was "Confide in Me". The song "Celebration" from her first 1992 Greatest Hits was also included.

In her 2000's era, three songs from her seventh album, Light Years, were featured, these being "Spinning Around", "On a Night Like This" and "Kids". From her eighth studio album, all singles were featured except "Come into My World". From her ninth, all but "Chocolate". From her tenth, "Wow" and "In My Arms" were included and two from her eleventh album were "All the Lovers" and "Get Outta My Way". "I Believe in You" from her second Greatest Hits compilation Ultimate Kylie also saw inclusion on the album. It is worth noting that tracks from her sixth studio album Impossible Princess were not featured on the compilation album. Her latest single release at the time, "Timebomb", a K25 surprise, was also excluded.

The album was released on 4 June in Europe and the United Kingdom, while it was released in the United States on 19 June. On 27 June 2014, two years after its annual release, The Best of Kylie Minogue was released in Australia and New Zealand digitally and physically.

== Reception ==
=== Critical response ===
Professional ratings
Aggregate scores
| Source | Rating |
|---|---|
| Metacritic | 75/100 |
Review scores
| Source | Rating |
| AllMusic | 4.5/5 stars |
| Q | (mixed) |
| Rolling Stone | 4/5 stars |

The Best of Kylie Minogue received generally positive reviews from most contemporary music critics. The Best of Kylie Minogue received a score of 75/100 on Metacritic, indicating "Generally favorable reviews". Barry Walters of Rolling Stone gave the compilation four out of five stars, writing that it "plays like a crash course in the history of international club style—from the aerobic corn of her fluke 1988 hit 'The Loco-Motion' to 2010's feistier French house-inspired 'Get Outta My Way.'" AllMusic's Tim Sendra gave it four-and-a-half out of five stars and concluded, "This collection is proof that Kylie is arguably the best pop singer of her era and more importantly, is fun from beginning to end." OK! magazine called the compilation "[a]mazing" and stated that "Kylie collects together some of her finest moments."

However, Robbie Daw of Idolator commented that "while we were hoping for something more along the lines of a box set compiling her complete singles discography (sigh), we'll have to settle for the 21-track The Best of Kylie Minogue". Q gave it a favorable review, but said "Part cipher, part siren, Minogue's odd power is underlined: it's not always clear quite what she does, but she does it brilliantly." PopMatters also gave it a favourable review. However, they said "If there were crimes committed against pop many moons ago, there is redemptive evidence on The Best of Kylie Minogue to warrant her a full reprieve 'n' pardon and perhaps even freedom of the city." They later concluded with a mixed reaction saying, "Misleading title, dopey sequencing and occasional 'Just crap'-ness aside, The Best of still offers much masterclass in perfect pop."

=== Commercial performance ===
The Best of Kylie Minogue debuted at number eleven on the UK Albums Chart, selling 9,703 copies in its first week. However, in its third week, the album descended out of the top forty to number forty-seven. It then descended to number ninety-seven for its last week, staying there for four weeks in total. The compilation managed to peak inside the top forty in countries including Scotland, Ireland, Czech Republic and Spain. In the U.S., the compilation debuted at number thirteen on the U.S. Dance/Electronic Albums. However, in its second week, the compilation descended to number twenty-three and fell out the next week.

== Track listing ==
Standard edition
| No. | Title | Writer(s) | Album | Length |
|---|---|---|---|---|
| 1. | "Can't Get You Out of My Head" | Cathy Dennis; Rob Davis | Fever | 3:50 |
| 2. | "Spinning Around" | Ira Shickman; Kara DioGuardi; Osborne Bingham; Paula Abdul | Light Years | 3:26 |
| 3. | "I Should Be So Lucky" | Mike Stock; Matt Aitken; Pete Waterman | Kylie | 3:24 |
| 4. | "Love at First Sight" | Kylie Minogue; Richard "Biff" Stannard; Julian Gallagher; Ash Howes; Martin Harrington | Fever | 3:58 |
| 5. | "In Your Eyes" | Minogue; Stannard; Gallagher; Howes | Fever | 3:17 |
| 6. | "Kids" (with Robbie Williams) | Williams; Guy Chambers | Light Years | 4:20 |
| 7. | "Better the Devil You Know" | Stock; Aitken; Waterman | Rhythm of Love | 3:53 |
| 8. | "All the Lovers" | Jim Eliot; Mima Stilwell | Aphrodite | 3:19 |
| 9. | "Give Me Just a Little More Time" | Edythe Wayne; Ron Dunbar | Let's Get to It | 3:08 |
| 10. | "Celebration" | Ronald Bell; George Brown; Robert Bell; Robert Mickens; James Taylor; Dennis Thomas; Claydes Smith; Earl Toon; Eumir Deodato | Greatest Hits | 3:58 |
| 11. | "Slow" | Minogue; Dan Carey; Emilíana Torrini | Body Language | 3:13 |
| 12. | "Red Blooded Woman" | Johnny Douglas; Karen Poole | Body Language | 4:20 |
| 13. | "I Believe in You" | Minogue; Jake Shears; Babydaddy | Ultimate Kylie | 3:20 |
| 14. | "On a Night Like This" | Steve Torch; Mark Taylor; Graham Stack; Brian Rawling | Light Years | 3:32 |
| 15. | "Confide in Me" (radio mix) | Steve Anderson; Dave Seaman; Edward Barton | Kylie Minogue | 4:25 |
| 16. | "Get Outta My Way" | Lucas Secon; Damon Sharpe; Peter Wallevik; Daniel Davidsen; Mich Hansen | Aphrodite | 3:38 |
| 17. | "The Loco-Motion" (7" mix) | Gerry Goffin; Carole King | Kylie | 3:13 |
| 18. | "Tears on My Pillow" | Sylvester Bradford; Al Lewis | Enjoy Yourself | 2:29 |
| 19. | "Wow" | Minogue; Poole; Greg Kurstin | X | 3:10 |
| 20. | "In My Arms" | Minogue; Calvin Harris; Stannard; Paul Harris; Julian Peake | X | 3:30 |
| 21. | "Never Too Late" | Stock; Aitken; Waterman | Enjoy Yourself | 3:22 |
| Total length: | | | | 74:45 |

Japanese edition
| No. | Title | Writer(s) | Album | Length |
|---|---|---|---|---|
| 21. | "Better than Today" | Nerina Pallot; Andy Chatterley | Aphrodite | 3:25 |
| 22. | "Never Too Late" | Stock; Aitken; Waterman | Enjoy Yourself | 3:22 |
| Total length: | | | | 78:10 |

Special edition (DVD)
| No. | Title | Director | Length |
|---|---|---|---|
| 1. | "Can't Get You Out of My Head" | Dawn Shadforth | 3:50 |
| 2. | "Spinning Around" | Shadforth | 3:28 |
| 3. | "I Should Be So Lucky" | Chris Langman | 3:26 |
| 4. | "Love at First Sight" | Johan Renck | 3:58 |
| 5. | "In Your Eyes" | Shadforth | 3:19 |
| 6. | "Kids" (with Robbie Williams) | Simon Hilton | 4:47 |
| 7. | "Better the Devil You Know" | Paul Goldman | 3:57 |
| 8. | "All the Lovers" | Joseph Kahn | 3:20 |
| 9. | "Give Me Just a Little More Time" | Greg Masuak | 3:05 |
| 10. | "Celebration" | Masuak | 4:02 |
| 11. | "Slow" | Baillie Walsh | 3:57 |
| 12. | "Red Blooded Woman" | Jake Nava | 4:11 |
| 13. | "I Believe in You" | Vernie Yeung | 3:26 |
| 14. | "On a Night Like This" | Douglas Avery | 4:09 |
| 15. | "Confide in Me" | Paul Boyd | 5:58 |
| 16. | "Get Outta My Way" | AlexandLiane | 3:43 |
| 17. | "The Loco-Motion" | Langman | 3:19 |
| 18. | "Tears on My Pillow" | Pete Cornish | 2:28 |
| 19. | "Wow" | Melina Matsoukas | 3:11 |
| 20. | "In My Arms" | Matsoukas | 3:35 |
| 21. | "Never Too Late" | Cornish | 3:23 |
| Total length: | | | 77:57 |

Japanese special edition (DVD)
| No. | Title | Director | Length |
|---|---|---|---|
| 21. | "Better than Today" | William Baker | 3:26 |
| 22. | "Never Too Late" | Cornish | 3:23 |
| Total length: | | | 81:23 |

== Charts ==
| Chart (2012) | Peak position |
|---|---|
| Argentine Albums (CAPIF) | 2 |
| Belgian Albums (Ultratop Flanders) | 45 |
| Belgian Albums (Ultratop Wallonia) | 58 |
| Czech Albums (ČNS IFPI) | 22 |
| French Albums (SNEP) | 69 |
| German Albums (Offizielle Top 100) | 85 |
| Irish Albums (IRMA) | 22 |
| Italian Albums (FIMI) | 49 |
| Japanese Albums (Oricon) | 76 |
| Mexican Albums (Top 100 Mexico) | 44 |
| Scottish Albums (OCC) | 10 |
| Spanish Albums (Promusicae) | 26 |
| Swiss Albums (Schweizer Hitparade) | 63 |
| UK Albums (OCC) | 11 |
| US Top Dance Albums (Billboard) | 13 |
| Venezuelan Albums (Recordland) | 15 |
| Chart (2014) | Peak position |
| Australian Albums (ARIA) | 39 |
| Chart (2026) | Peak position |
| Australian On Replay Albums (ARIA) | 34 |

== Certifications ==
| Region | Certification | Certified units/sales |
|---|---|---|
| United Kingdom (BPI) | Silver | 60,000^{*} |
^{*} Sales figures based on certification alone.

== Release history ==
| Region | Date | Format | Label | Ref. |
|---|---|---|---|---|
| Italy | 28 May 2012 | CD | EMI | |
| France | 30 May 2012 | CD; CD+DVD | EMI | |
| Germany | 1 June 2012 | CD; CD+DVD; digital download | EMI | |
| France | 4 June 2012 | Digital download | EMI | |
| Italy | 4 June 2012 | Digital download | EMI | |
| Japan | 4 June 2012 | CD; digital download | EMI | |
| United Kingdom | 4 June 2012 | CD; CD+DVD; digital download | EMI | |
| United States | 4 June 2012 | CD; digital download | EMI | |
| United States | 19 June 2012 | CD+DVD | EMI | |
| New Zealand | 19 June 2012 | CD; CD+DVD | Warner Music Australasia | |
| New Zealand | 27 June 2014 | Digital download | Warner Music Australasia | |
| Australia | 27 June 2014 | CD; CD+DVD; digital download | Warner Music Australasia | |
