= Kylie Christmas =

2015 album by Kylie Minogue

- Standard edition cover

Studio album by Kylie Minogue
- Released: 13 November 2015
- Recorded: 2000–2015
- Studios: Angel Studios; Drum Den; Elite Music Studios (Miami, Florida); Metropolis Studios (South Melbourne, Australia); Sarm Music Village; State of the Ark Studios; Westlake Studios (Los Angeles, California); Westpoint Studios
- Genres: Pop; Christmas; disco
- Length: 40:07
- Labels: Parlophone; Warner Bros.
- Producers: Kylie Minogue (exec.); Steve Anderson; Ash Howes; Richard "Biff" Stannard; Charles Pignone; Matt Prime; Stargate; Chong Lim

Kylie Minogue chronology
Kylie and Garibay (2015)	Kylie Christmas (2015)	Golden (2018)

Singles from Kylie Christmas
- 1. "Only You" Released: 9 November 2015; 2. "100 Degrees" Released: 13 November 2015; 3. "Every Day's Like Christmas" Released: 2 December 2015

Kylie Christmas is the thirteenth studio album and first Christmas album by Australian singer Kylie Minogue. It was released on 13 November 2015 by Parlophone. Following the release of her twelfth studio album, Kiss Me Once, Minogue announced her departure from Parlophone, and her management deal with American label, Roc Nation. Minogue signed an exclusive one-album deal with Parlophone to release Kylie Christmas, with distribution through Warner Music Group worldwide and Warner Bros. Records in the United States. A Christmas music album consisting of thirteen songs and three bonus tracks, Kylie Christmas contains both cover versions and original songs.

Three singles were released from Kylie Christmas. "Only You" was released as the lead single on 9 November 2015, a duet with British actor and singer, James Corden. "100 Degrees", a duet with Minogue's sister Dannii was promoted on 24 November and a remix of "Every Day's Like Christmas" was released on 2 December 2015.

Minogue held a one-off concert at the Royal Albert Hall in London on 11 December to commemorate the album's release. Upon its release, Kylie Christmas received generally mixed reviews from music critics. Many critics praised the album's production and original material, while others criticised Minogue's lack of innovation and vocal delivery, as well as the duets.

Kylie Christmas has been reissued twice. The first reissue, released on 25 November 2016, was an expanded edition titled the Snow Queen Edition, which added six new tracks, including a collaboration with British singer-songwriter Mika. To promote the release, Minogue performed two additional concerts at the Royal Albert Hall. A second reissue, titled Fully Wrapped, was released on 5 December 2025, features a revised track listing and four newly recorded songs. The second reissue reached No. 1 on the UK Albums Chart, 10 years after the initial release.

== Background and development ==
Kylie Christmas is Minogue's first Christmas studio album and her thirteenth overall studio album. Minogue previously released the Christmas track "Santa Baby", which appeared on her 2000 single, "Please Stay"; a recording of "Let It Snow" in 2010; and two Christmas extended plays in 2010, A Kylie Christmas and A Christmas Gift. Speaking with Idolator's Mike Wass, Minogue stated "I always thought I would do a Christmas album, it was just a case of when... I mentioned it to a couple of people on my team and they were saying, 'What do you want to do for the rest of the year? What do you want to do next?' I said, 'I'm thinking about a Christmas album, actually.' Some of that stems from last Christmas." Minogue said that she had Christmas in Los Angeles, California in 2014, and her friend suggested recording a Christmas album; "They just assumed I had done one, and when I said I hadn't done an entire album they just started, 'You've got to do it. It would be amazing. We just want to see your little outfits.'" Kylie Christmas was recorded at Angel Recording Studios and Sarm Music Village, and features a mix of both classical Christmas songs and new original material.

== Composition ==
Kylie Christmas is a Christmas music album with elements of EDM, pop, and disco music. Minogue served as the album's executive producer, and enlisted Steve Anderson, Ash Howes, Richard "Biff" Stannard, Charles Pignone, Matt Prime, and Stargate to produce the tracks. This is her second album to be executive producer; she was executive producer alongside Australian recording artist Sia on her 2014 studio album, Kiss Me Once. The standard album consists of ten cover songs and three original tracks; Minogue co-wrote "White December" and "Christmas Isn't Christmas 'Til You Get Here". The third original song, "Every Day's Like Christmas", was written by British alternative rock band Coldplay lead singer Chris Martin (with Stargate) and featured backing vocals that were provided by him. The deluxe edition features three new original tracks: "Oh Santa", "100 Degrees", and "Cried Out Christmas", and were co-written by Minogue. Minogue revealed that she asked friends and colleagues to select their favourite songs from the recording sessions.

Several tracks were recorded with live instrumentation; "Winter Wonderland" and "Let It Snow" were described to have "Vegas-style with horns, strings, and plenty of schmaltz." "Every Day's Like Christmas" was described as a "modern pop ballad", while "White December" and "Christmas Isn't Christmas Until You Get Here" are girl group-inspired songs. "Only You", despite not being a Christmas song, was described as a "sweet" and "tender" ballad, while "It's the Most Wonderful Time of the Year", "Have Yourself a Merry Little Christmas", "Santa Baby", "Let It Snow", "Winter Wonderland" and "Santa Claus Is Coming to Town" (a duet with American recording artist Frank Sinatra) were described as "old school, feel-good festive faves". The tracks "Santa Baby" and "Let It Snow" were originally recorded in 2000 and 2010, respectively; "Let It Snow" was re-recorded for the album, while the 2000 recording of "Santa Baby", although appearing on several various-artists Christmas albums over the years, was never included on any Kylie Minogue album until then.

== Release ==
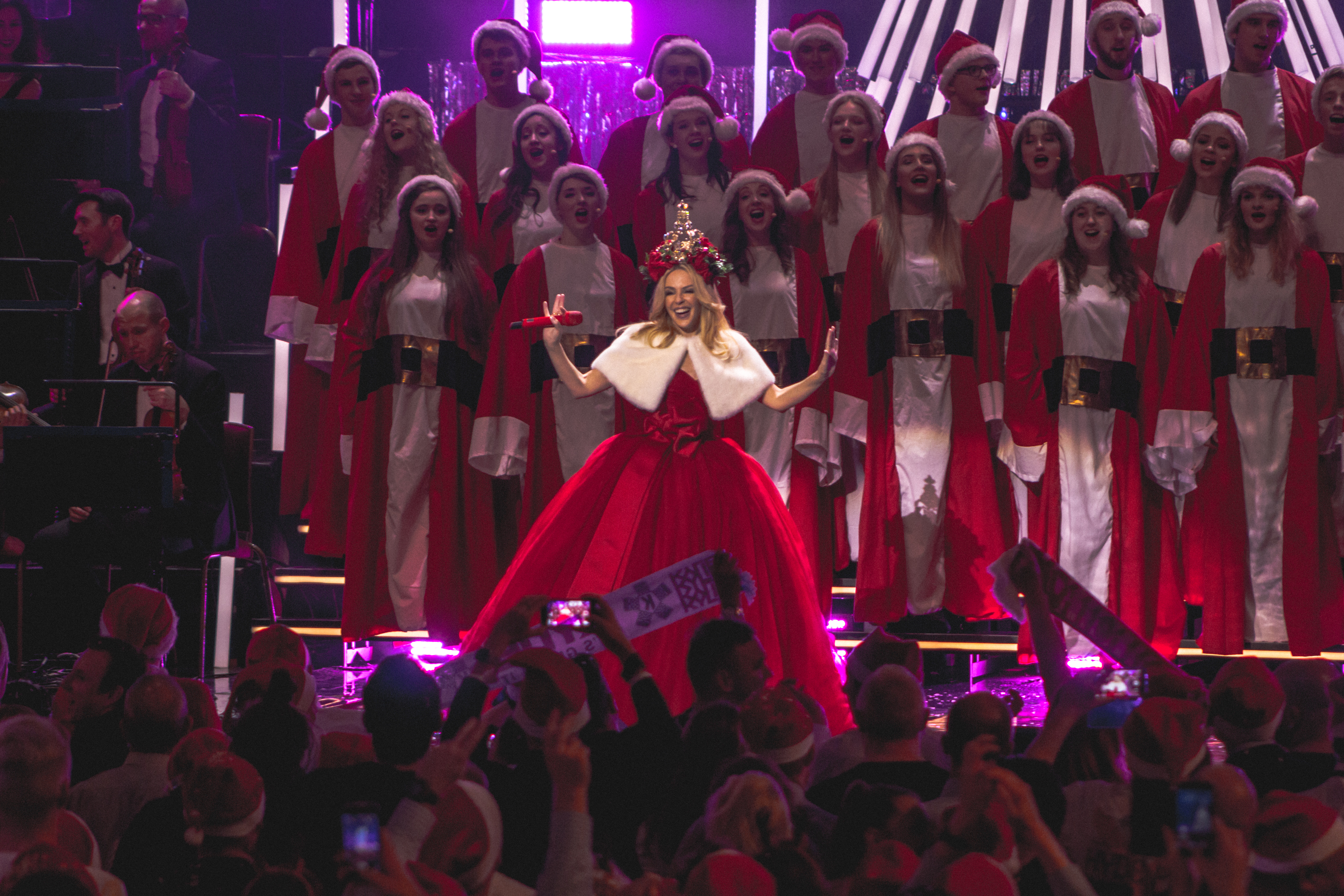
Minogue performing during one of her Kylie Christmas concerts in 2015

In October 2015, Minogue announced the release of Kylie Christmas. Kylie Christmas was released on 13 November 2015 as a CD and DVD bundle, while a limited white vinyl edition was released on 27 November. The deluxe album consists of sixteen songs, while the digital download and vinyl editions feature thirteen tracks; the DVD includes six music videos. The deluxe album features a gold ribbon on the cover.

Minogue released the reissue Kylie Christmas: Snow Queen Edition on 25 November 2016 by Parlophone. Released 12 months after the original, the Snow Queen Edition features six newly recorded songs. Minogue announced the release of Kylie Christmas: Snow Queen Edition on 2 November 2016. The album artwork and track list were revealed on the same day. On 4 November 2016, the album was made available for pre-order worldwide via Minogue's official site, offering different options to purchase. It was released worldwide as a CD and digital download on 25 November 2016.

On 4 November 2025, Minogue teased another edition of the album, posting a video to her social media pages. The following day, she announced the Fully Wrapped edition, the second reissue featuring a revised track list of selected songs from the album as well as four new songs, "Hot in December", "This Time of Year", "Office Party", and the Amazon Music-exclusive single "XMAS". It was released worldwide on vinyl, CD, cassette, digital download, and streaming on 5 December 2025.

== Promotion ==
Minogue confirmed that she would perform on The X Factor Australia on 24 November in Australia, performing "100 Degrees" alongside Dannii. This was the duo's first televised performance together in twenty-seven years, and their first performance together since their live performance of "Kids" on Minogue's Showgirl: The Homecoming Tour in 2006. On 8 December, Minogue performed "It's the Most Wonderful Time of the Year" on the Royal Variety Performance. Minogue promoted the album with a one-night performance at the Royal Albert Hall on 11 December. Minogue commented on the reveal: "To perform at the Royal Albert Hall will be a dream come true. I can't wait for the 11th December to share a night of joy and celebration with everyone." The show was sold out after its announcement. On 13 December, Minogue performed "I'm Gonna Be Warm This Winter" on Strictly Come Dancing.

To promote Kylie Christmas: Snow Queen Edition, Minogue made television appearances and performances. It was further promoted by two concerts at the Royal Albert Hall in London, as part of her A Kylie Christmas concert series in December 2016.

Minogue's cover of "Everybody's Free (To Feel Good)" by Rozalla was used in a Christmas TV advertisement for British pharmacy chain Boots. To promote the album in Europe, Minogue performed "Night Fever" on French programme Quotidien. On 6 December, Minogue performed "At Christmas", "Can't Get You Out of My Head" and "Wonderful Christmastime" with Mika on Stasera Casa Mika. The album was also supported by two performances on 9 and 10 December 2016, at the Royal Albert Hall in London, as part of her A Kylie Christmas concert series. On 10 December, a performance of "At Christmas" was aired on The Jonathan Ross Show and on 11 December she performed "Everybody's Free (To Feel Good)" on The X Factor UK final. On 16 December, Minogue performed "Night Fever" on Danse avec les stars.

"At Christmas" was released as the lead single for the album. It was announced on 4 November 2016, when the album was made available for pre-order via Minogue's official site. The single premiered on 22 November on The Chris Evans Breakfast Show on BBC Radio 2. "Wonderful Christmastime" with Mika was released as the second single off the album. It impacted Italian radio stations on 9 December 2016.

To promote Kylie Christmas: Fully Wrapped, a pop-up shop was opened on release week at the Battersea Power Station in London. The shop contained exclusive formats of the album, including limited-edition test pressings, as well as Christmas-themed merchandise and her Lovers fragrances. She also headlined the Capital FM Jingle Bell Ball at London's O2 Arena on 7 December 2025. Furthermore, she released music videos for "Office Party" and "XMAS", as well as visualizers for all songs on YouTube.

== Critical reception ==
Professional ratings
Aggregate scores
Source	Rating
AnyDecentMusic?	5.0/10
Metacritic	55/100
Review scores
Source	Rating
AllMusic	3/5 stars
The Guardian	1/5 stars
Herald Sun	3.5/5 stars
The Independent	2/5 stars
The Irish Times	2/5 stars
The Music	3/5 stars
musicOMH	3/5 stars
Q	3/5 stars
Rolling Stone	3.5/5 stars
Slant Magazine	3/5 stars

Kylie Christmas received mixed reviews from music critics. At Metacritic, which assigns a normalised rating out of 100 to reviews from mainstream critics, the album received an average score of 55, which indicates "mixed or average reviews", based on 7 reviews. Tim Sendra from AllMusic awarded the album three stars out of five, and stated "She and her team do it right, providing a varied and diverse selection of tracks and moods," and highlighted "Christmas Wrapping", "I'm Gonna Be Warm This Christmas", and "White December" as the album's best tracks. He concluded "Throughout the album, Kylie sounds very game, merry even, and there's enough holiday spirit on offer to help even the grinchiest customer make it through the season with the bare minimum of humbug." The Herald Sun contributors, Cameron Adams, Mike Cahill, and Cyclone Wehner, awarded the album three-and-a-half stars out of five, commending Anderson's production skills and said "Anderson's lush fingerprints were all over her Abbey Road orchestral hits album a few years back and he was clearly the man for this Christmas album." Sal Cinquemani from Slant Magazine reviewed the leaked material, and awarded it three stars out of five. Cinquemani commended the original material, highlighting "Every Day's Like Christmas" as the best track, and praised the album's mixture of Christmas music with disco and electronic dance music. However, he criticized Minogue's "lack of magic", and concluded "that's not to say an album of disco or EDM-infused holiday songs wouldn't have been predictable in its own way, but for a once fearlessly progressive pop star, the otherwise lovingly executed and heartwarming Kylie Christmas feels like a bit of a missed opportunity to innovate a well-worn genre."

However, Andy Gill from The Independent awarded the album two stars. He criticised Minogue's lack of creative delivery, by stating "But they're let down by the lack of character in Kylie's delivery, most notably on 'Santa Claus Is Coming to Town', a posthumous duet with Frank Sinatra, where his easy, relaxed manner is in sharp contrast to her discomfort." He commended the musical diversity of the tracks, highlighting "Let It Snow", "Winter Wonderland", and "Every Day's Like Christmas", and highlighted "White December", "Cried Out Christmas", and "Christmas Wrapping" as the best tracks. Lauren Murphy from The Irish Times argued the relevance of the album, by stating "We've heard it all before, so do we really need another pop star doing another bog-standard Christmas album with a sprinkling of festive cheese? To be fair, Kylie Minogue is better placed than most to do such an album, given her longevity in the business." Murphy concluded "'2,000 Miles' is one of the few saving graces on yet another inessential album that will have no bearing on your enjoyment of the festive season whatsoever." Several publications mentioned the album on their anticipated releases of 2015, including Unrealitytv.co.uk.

In 2022, Billboard placed Kylie Christmas seventh on their Best Christmas Albums of the 21st Century list.

== Commercial performance ==
In Australia, midweek expectations had the album inside the top ten. It later debuted at number 7 on the Australian Albums Chart, becoming Minogue's fifteenth top 10 album. In the United Kingdom, the midweek chart placed Kylie Christmas at number six, which would have made it her eleventh studio album to chart inside the top ten. However, on the week end of 19 November 2015, Kylie Christmas debuted at twelve on the UK Albums Chart. This became Minogue's first album to miss the top ten since her 1991 studio album, Let's Get to It, which reached fifteen. It was later certified Gold by the British Phonographic Industry (BPI).

Following the Fully Wrapped reissue in 2025, Kylie Christmas reached new peaks of number 4 on the ARIA Albums Chart in Australia and number 1 on the UK Albums Chart with 23,279 units sold. It marked Minogue's eleventh number-one album in the United Kingdom.

== Track listing ==
Kylie Christmas – Standard edition
No.	Title	Writer(s)	Producer(s)	Length
1.	"It's the Most Wonderful Time of the Year"	Edward Pola; George Wyle	Steve Anderson	2:44
2.	"Santa Claus Is Coming to Town" (featuring Frank Sinatra)	John Frederick Coots; Haven Gillespie	Charles Pignone; Anderson	2:15
3.	"Winter Wonderland"	Felix Bernard; Richard B. Smith	Anderson	1:53
4.	"Christmas Wrapping" (with Iggy Pop)	Chris Butler	Anderson	5:05
5.	"Only You" (with James Corden)	Vincent Clarke	Anderson	3:05
6.	"I'm Gonna Be Warm This Winter"	Hank Hunter; Mark Barkan	Anderson	2:29
7.	"Every Day's Like Christmas"	Mikkel Eriksen; Tor Erik Hermansen; Chris Martin	Stargate; Anderson^{[a]}	4:13
8.	"Let It Snow"	Sammy Cahn; Jule Styne	Anderson	1:56
9.	"White December"	Kylie Minogue; Karen Poole; Matt Prime	Prime	3:07
10.	"2000 Miles"	Chrissie Hynde	Anderson	3:34
11.	"Santa Baby"	Joan Javits; Philip Springer; Tony Springer	Chong Lim; Anderson	3:22
12.	"Christmas Isn't Christmas 'Til You Get Here"	Minogue; Anderson; Poole	Anderson	3:03
13.	"Have Yourself a Merry Little Christmas"	Hugh Martin; Ralph Blane	Anderson	3:22
Total length:				40:07

Kylie Christmas – Deluxe edition bonus tracks
No.	Title	Writer(s)	Producer(s)	Length
14.	"Oh Santa"	Minogue; Ash Howes; Richard Stannard; Anderson	Howes; Stannard; Anderson	2:38
15.	"100 Degrees" (with Dannii Minogue)	Minogue; Howes; Stannard; Anderson	Howes; Stannard; Anderson	4:31
16.	"Cried Out Christmas"	Minogue; Poole; Prime	Prime	3:44
Total length:				51:00

Kylie Christmas – Deluxe edition DVD
No.	Title	Length
1.	"It's the Most Wonderful Time of the Year"	2:44
2.	"2000 Miles"	3:35
3.	"Christmas Isn't Christmas 'Til You Get Here"	3:04
4.	"100 Degrees" (with Dannii Minogue)	4:31
5.	"I'm Gonna Be Warm This Winter"	2:29
6.	"Oh Santa"	2:37
Total length:		19:00

Kylie Christmas: Snow Queen Edition
No.	Title	Writer(s)	Producer(s)	Length
1.	"It's the Most Wonderful Time of the Year"	Pola; Wyle	Anderson	2:44
2.	"Santa Claus Is Coming to Town" (featuring Frank Sinatra)	Gillespie; Coots	Pignone; Anderson	2:15
3.	"Winter Wonderland"	Smith; Bernard	Anderson	1:53
4.	"Only You" (with James Corden)	Clarke	Anderson	3:05
5.	"Stay Another Day"	Tony Mortimer; Rob Kean; Dominic Hawken	Anderson	3:40
6.	"Christmas Wrapping" (with Iggy Pop)	Butler	Anderson	5:05
7.	"At Christmas"	Peter Wallevik; Daniel Davidsen; Patrick Joseph Devine	Wallevik; Davidsen; Eric J. Dubowsky^{[a]}	3:46
8.	"I'm Gonna Be Warm This Winter"	Hunter; Barkan	Anderson	2:29
9.	"Every Day's Like Christmas"	C. Martin; Eriksen; Hermansen	Stargate; Anderson^{[a]}	4:12
10.	"Wonderful Christmastime" (with Mika)	Paul McCartney	Anderson	3:42
11.	"100 Degrees" (with Dannii Minogue)	Minogue; Howes; Stannard; Anderson	Howes; Stannard; Anderson	4:31
12.	"Let It Snow"	Styne; Cahn	Anderson	1:56
13.	"I Wish It Could Be Christmas Everyday"	Roy Wood	Anderson	4:14
14.	"White December"	Minogue; Poole; Prime	Prime	3:07
15.	"2000 Miles"	Hynde	Anderson	3:34
16.	"Santa Baby"	Javits; P. Springer; T. Springer	Lim; Anderson	3:22
17.	"Christmas Isn't Christmas 'Til You Get Here"	Minogue; Poole; Anderson	Anderson	3:03
18.	"Have Yourself a Merry Little Christmas"	H. Martin; Blane	Anderson	3:22
19.	"Oh Santa"	Minogue; Howes; Stannard; Anderson	Anderson	2:38
20.	"Cried Out Christmas"	Minogue; Poole; Prime	Prime	3:44
21.	"Christmas Lights"	C. Martin; Guy Berryman; Jonathan Buckland; William Champion	Anderson	4:06
22.	"Everybody's Free (To Feel Good)"	Nigel Swanston; Tim Cox	Anderson	2:10
Total length:				72:39

Kylie Christmas (Fully Wrapped)
No.	Title	Writer(s)	Producer(s)	Length
1.	"It's the Most Wonderful Time of the Year"	Pola; Wyle	Anderson	2:44
2.	"Santa Baby"	Javits; P. Springer; T. Springer	Lim; Anderson	3:22
3.	"Hot in December"	Minogue; Duck Blackwell; Ferras Alqaisi; Jason Evigan; Sarah Hudson; Pablo Bowman; Luke Fitton; Stannard	Blackwell; Stannard	3:12
4.	"At Christmas"	Wallevik; Davidsen; Devine	Wallevik; Davidsen; Dubowsky^{[a]}	3:46
5.	"Santa Claus Is Coming to Town" (featuring Frank Sinatra)	Gillespie; Coots	Pignone; Anderson	2:15
6.	"This Time of Year"	Minogue; Blackwell; Fitton; Stannard	Blackwell; Stannard	3:29
7.	"100 Degrees" (with Dannii Minogue)	Minogue; Howes; Stannard; Anderson	Howes; Stannard; Anderson	4:31
8.	"Office Party"	Minogue; Blackwell; Fitton; Stannard	Blackwell; Stannard	2:56
9.	"White December"	Minogue; Poole; Prime	Prime	3:07
10.	"Let It Snow"	Styne; Cahn	Anderson	1:56
11.	"Christmas Isn't Christmas 'Til You Get Here"	Minogue; Anderson; Poole	Anderson	3:03
12.	"Have Yourself a Merry Little Christmas"	H. Martin; Blane	Anderson	3:22

Kylie Christmas (Fully Wrapped) – Amazon Music and 2026 digital edition bonus track
No.	Title	Writer(s)	Producer(s)	Length
2.	"XMAS"	Minogue; Fitton; Blackwell; Stannard	Stannard; Blackwell	3:16

Notes

- ^a signifies a vocal producer

== Charts ==
=== Weekly charts ===
Chart (2015)	Peak position
Australian Albums (ARIA)	7
Austrian Albums (Ö3 Austria)	46
Belgian Albums (Ultratop Flanders)	23
Belgian Albums (Ultratop Wallonia)	53
Czech Albums (ČNS IFPI)	18
Dutch Albums (Album Top 100)	41
French Albums (SNEP)	76
German Albums (Offizielle Top 100)	34
Greek Albums (IFPI Greece)	34
Hungarian Albums (MAHASZ)	8
Irish Albums (IRMA)	14
Italian Albums (FIMI)	59
Japanese Albums (Oricon)	171
New Zealand Albums (RMNZ)	37
Scottish Albums (Official Charts)	13
South Korean Albums (Gaon)	71
South Korean Albums International (Gaon)	14
Spanish Albums (PROMUSICAE)	31
Swedish Albums (Sverigetopplistan)	39
Swiss Albums (Schweizer Hitparade)	51
UK Albums (Official Charts)	12
US Billboard 200	184
US Top Holiday Albums (Billboard)	13

Chart (2016)	Peak position
Australian Albums (ARIA)	30
Belgian Albums (Ultratop Flanders)	106
Belgian Albums (Ultratop Wallonia)	88
Dutch Albums (Album Top 100)	64
French Albums (SNEP)	179
Irish Albums (IRMA)	11
Scottish Albums (Official Charts)	42
UK Albums (Official Charts)	41

==== Kylie Christmas (Fully Wrapped) ====
Chart (2025–2026)	Peak position
Australian Albums (ARIA)	4
Belgian Albums (Ultratop Flanders)	16
Belgian Albums (Ultratop Wallonia)	10
Croatian International Albums (HDU)	1
Dutch Albums (Album Top 100)	47
French Albums (SNEP)	91
German Albums (Offizielle Top 100)	81
Irish Albums (Official Charts)	40
Italian Albums (FIMI)	81
Scottish Albums (Official Charts)	1
Spanish Albums (Promusicae)	30
UK Albums (Official Charts)	1

=== Year-end charts ===
Chart (2015)	Position
Australian Albums (ARIA)	38
Australian Artist Albums (ARIA)	11
Hungarian Albums (MAHASZ)	27
UK Albums (OCC)	61

Chart (2025)	Position
Australian Artist Albums (ARIA)	37
Croatian International Albums (HDU)	21

== Certifications ==
Region	Certification	Certified units/sales
Hungary (MAHASZ)	Gold	1,000^{^}
United Kingdom (BPI)	Gold	180,000
^{^} Shipments figures based on certification alone.

== Release history ==
Country	Date	Format	Version	Label
Worldwide	13 November 2015	CD; CD+DVD; digital download	Standard; deluxe	Parlophone
Worldwide	27 November 2015	Vinyl	Standard; deluxe	Parlophone
Various	25 November 2016	CD; digital download; streaming	Snow Queen Edition	Parlophone
Various	5 December 2025	CD; digital download; streaming; Vinyl	Fully Wrapped Edition	Parlophone
