= Hope (Susan Boyle album) =

Studio album by Susan Boyle
- Released: 21 October 2014
- Label: Syco, Columbia, Sony Music
- Producer: Cliff Masterson, Steve Anderson, Ash Howes, Ken Watts, Kennedy Aitchison

Susan Boyle chronology
Home for Christmas (2013)	Hope (2014)	A Wonderful World (2016)

Hope is the sixth studio album by Scottish singer Susan Boyle. It was released on 21 October 2014 in North America by Syco Music and Columbia Records.

== Background ==
The album contains renditions of classic ballads and uptempo songs themed around inspiration and hope as Boyle sees those as the "two elements we all need in our life to drive us forward and inspire us to go out and capture our dreams; they worked for me after all." Boyle furthermore said of the album, "I have really enjoyed making this album. I had a huge input in music suggestions and finally have been able to record one of my all time favourites, 'Angel', originally by Sarah Mclachlan. I also am pleased to be able to sing some uptempo songs that show variation in my repertoire."

== Release and performance ==
The album debuted at number 16 on the Billboard 200 in the United States, becoming Susan Boyle's sixth consecutive top 20 album there. The album spent 35 weeks at No. 1 on the Billboard Top Inspirational Albums chart. It has sold 115,000 copies in the United States as of November 2016.

== Track listing ==
No.	Title	Writer(s)	Producer(s)	Length
1.	"Wish You Were Here"	Roger Waters, David Gilmour	Cliff Masterson, Steve Anderson, Ash Howes^{[a]}	3:42
2.	"I Can Only Imagine"	Bart Millard	Masterson, Anderson, Howes^{[a]}	3:34
3.	"Angel"	Sarah McLachlan	Masterson, Anderson, Howes^{[a]}	4:27
4.	"Abide with Me"	Traditional	Masterson, Anderson	2:22
5.	"Imagine"	John Lennon	Masterson, Anderson, Howes^{[a]}	3:25
6.	"Will the Circle Be Unbroken?"	Traditional	Masterson, Anderson	4:06
7.	"Bridge over Troubled Water"	Paul Simon	Masterson, Anderson, Howes^{[a]}	4:53
8.	"The Impossible Dream (The Quest)"	Mitch Leigh, Joe Darion	Masterson, Anderson, Howes^{[a]}	4:00
9.	"Oh Happy Day"	Edwin Hawkins	Masterson, Anderson, Howes^{[a]}	3:26
10.	"You Raise Me Up" (live) (featuring Lakewood Church Choir)	Rolf Løvland, Brendan Graham	Ken Watts, Kennedy Aitchison	3:47

Notes

- ^{^[a]} signifies an additional producer

== Charts and certifications ==
=== Charts ===
Chart (2014)	Peak position
Australian Albums (ARIA)	11
Belgian Albums (Ultratop Flanders)	81
Irish Albums (IRMA)	33
New Zealand Albums (RMNZ)	6
Scottish Albums (OCC)	7
UK Albums (OCC)	13
US Billboard 200	16

=== Certifications ===
Region	Certification	Certified units/sales
New Zealand (RMNZ)	Gold	7,500^{^}
United Kingdom (BPI)	Silver	75,326
^{^} Shipments figures based on certification alone.

== Release history ==
Region	Date	Format	Label
North America	21 October 2014	CD, digital download	Syco Music, Columbia
Australia	24 October 2014	CD, digital download	Syco Music, Sony Music
Germany	21 November 2014	CD, digital download	Syco Music, Sony Music
United Kingdom	24 November 2014	CD, digital download	Syco Music, Sony Music
