= Every Day's Like Christmas =

2015 single by Kylie Minogue

- Stock Aitken Waterman remix artwork

Single by Kylie Minogue

from the album Kylie Christmas
- Released: 2 December 2015
- Studio: Sarm Music Village (London, England); Westlake Recording Studios (Hollywood, CA)
- Genre: Electropop; Christmas
- Length: 4:13 (album version); 3:33 (remix version)
- Label: Parlophone
- Songwriters: Chris Martin; Mikkel Eriksen; Tor Erik Hermansen
- Producers: Stargate; Stock Aitken Waterman

Kylie Minogue singles chronology
"100 Degrees" (2015)	"Every Day's Like Christmas" (2015)	"At Christmas" (2016)

Music video
- "Every Day's Like Christmas" on YouTube

"Every Day's Like Christmas" is a song by Australian recording artist Kylie Minogue, taken from her thirteenth studio album and first Holiday album, Kylie Christmas (2015). It was written by Chris Martin, the frontman of the British alternative rock band Coldplay, and Stargate, who also produced. Martin also sings the backing vocals of the song. The song is an electropop ballad where Minogue describes her compassion towards her partner on Christmas Day. It contains elements of modern electronic music and Christmas music. A remix version by Stock Aitken Waterman was released as the third single from the album on 2 December 2015.

Critical reception towards "Every Day's Like Christmas" has been positive; some critics highlighted it as an album stand out, while many commended the song's production and Martin's involvement. The song had been subjected, primarily from the British media, as a contender for the United Kingdom Christmas number one of 2015. A music video was directed by David Lopez-Edwards, showing Minogue, her friends, and her then boyfriend, British actor Joshua Sasse, enjoying Christmas Day in her London home. Minogue later removed the music video from YouTube in May 2019. The song was performed at her live Christmas show at the Royal Albert Hall on 11 December 2015.

== Background and composition ==
In July 2015, American guitarist and producer Nile Rodgers and Minogue's sister Dannii Minogue were reported to be working on a rumoured "Christmas album". Minogue later confirmed it on her official Instagram account, and "Every Day's Like Christmas" was included on the finalized track list. "Every Day's Like Christmas" was written and composed by British musician, songwriter and Coldplay frontman Chris Martin alongside Stargate, who also produced the track. Martin, alongside Jimmy Junior and Kristen Gill, served as backing vocalists for the track. This song is the second collaboration between Martin and Minogue, after Coldplay and Minogue's 2008 single, "Lhuna".

"Every Day's Like Christmas" is a "modern pop ballad", according to Tim Sendra at Allmusic, and contains electropop elements. Tim Jonze from The Guardian noted its musical similarities to Coldplay, saying that because Martin penned and composed the song, it "delivered in the style of previous songs penned by Martin". Christopher Monk from MusicOMH described the song as a "tuneful melancholia of a Coldplay ballad." Pip Ellwood-Hughes from Entertainment Focus felt the song was a "dreamy, electro-pop" track. Lyrically, the song "details a romance that feels as sublime as Christmas," exemplifying the lyrics "Until you, every day was ordinary / It's true and now every day's like Christmas,"

== Release ==
"Every Day's Like Christmas" was remixed by Minogue's 1987–1991 producers and long-time collaborators, Stock Aitken Waterman (who consist of Mike Stock, Matt Aitken, and Pete Waterman.) It is Stock Aitken Waterman's first collaboration in more than twenty years, and their first collaboration with Minogue since their 1992 single Celebration.

== Critical reception ==
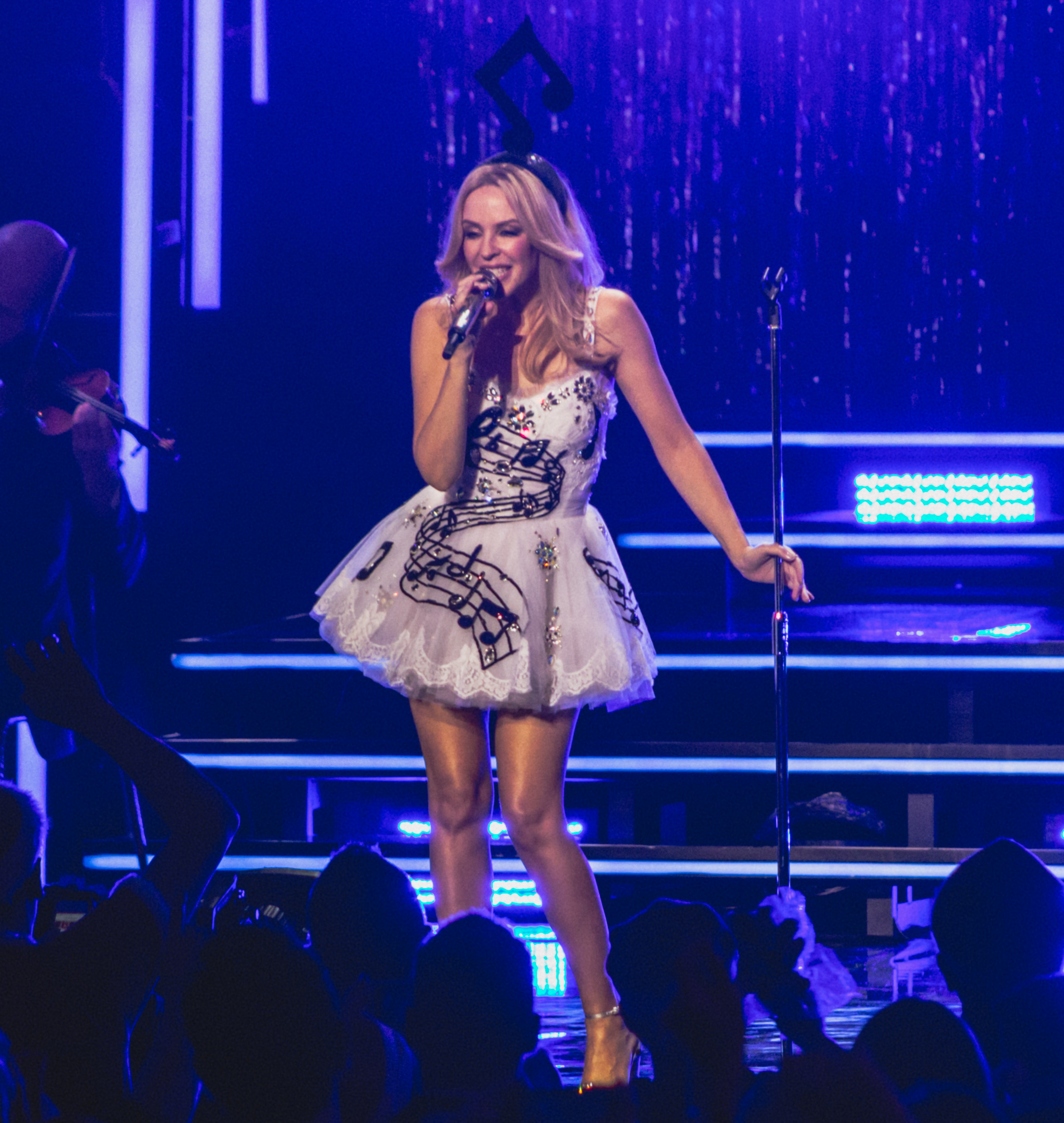
Minogue performing the song during one of her Kylie Christmas concerts, in 2015

"Every Day's Like Christmas" received universal acclaim from most music critics. Monk, Jonze, and Ellwood-Hughes labelled the song as the album highlight. Cameron Adams from Herald Sun was positive, saying "It sounds as poptastic as you’d expect a Christmas song written for Kylie by Chris Martin would sound, just with industrial strength sleigh bells." Piet Levy from Js Online stated that Martin, British musician Iggy Pop, and American musician Frank Sinatra, who collaborated on "Every Day's Like Christmas", "Christmas Wrapping" and "Santa Claus Is Coming to Town" "are three reasons why Kylie Christmas is a brimming cup of bubbly cheer, and three more reasons why Kylie Minogue is as savvy and enduring a pop star as Madonna." Gordon Ashenhurst from Metro Weekly said "If only every song on this album were in the same vein as "Every Day’s Like Christmas" — it not only justifies, but strengthens her reputation. Beautiful and lilting, it is truly deserving of future classic status. Written by Coldplay's Chris Martin, it's a shame such heart-melting beauty and ambition cannot be matched elsewhere."

The remix version received favourable reviews. A reviewer from PopCrush was positive, stating "So did the original version of "Every Day’s Like Christmas" leave you wanting a bit more disco? Leave you wanting to feel a bit more bouncy, exuberant, or joyous? Make you wonder what the track might sound like if the Pet Shop Boys tinkered with it? The Stock Aitken Waterman remix will answer all those questions and make good on all those promises." Rob Corpsey from The Official Charts Company stated "OK so this is pretty much the Christmas song to end all Christmas songs; a massive sugar rush of classic, candy-coated late 80s pop wrapped up in a big shiny red bow. Oh, and did we mention Kylie's singing on it?" He concluded "it's no wonder this latest offering is so good, because they've clearly got chemistry. We can't get enough of this and we reckon you'll feel the same..."

== Formats and track listing ==
- Digital download
1. "Every Day's Like Christmas" – 4:13
- A Stock Aitken Waterman Remix - Single
1. "Every Day's Like Christmas" (A Stock Aitken Waterman Remix) – 3:32

== Charts ==
Chart performance for "Every Day's Like Christmas"
Chart (2015)	Peak position
Belgium (Ultratip Bubbling Under Flanders) A Stock Aitken Waterman Remix	81

== Release history ==
Release history and formats for "Every Day's Like Christmas"
Country	Date	Format	Label
Various	2 December 2015	Digital download	Parlophone
Italy	11 December 2015	Contemporary hit radio	Parlophone
