= Flower (Kylie Minogue song) =

2012 single by Kylie Minogue

Single by Kylie Minogue

from the album The Abbey Road Sessions
- Released: 25 September 2012
- Studio: Abbey Road Studios, London, England
- Genre: Orchestral pop
- Length: 3:30
- Label: Parlophone
- Songwriters: Kylie Minogue; Steve Anderson
- Producer: Steve Anderson

Kylie Minogue singles chronology
"Timebomb" (2012)	"Flower" (2012)	"Limpido" (2013)

Music video
- "Flower" on YouTube

"Flower" is a song by Australian singer and songwriter Kylie Minogue. The song was originally written by Minogue and Steve Anderson of Brothers in Rhythm for Minogue's tenth studio album X (2007), but it did not make the final cut. However, it was performed in the set list for the KylieX2008 tour.

In 2011, the song was recorded at London's Abbey Road Studios for the orchestral compilation album The Abbey Road Sessions. The song was released as the first and only commercial single from the album on 25 September 2012 by Parlophone Records. The studio version of the song premiered on BBC Radio 2 on 24 September 2012. The song received positive reviews from music critics, with critics enjoying the lyrical message and the production. A music video was shot for the single which premiered on Minogue's website.

== Composition ==
"Flower" was written by Minogue and Steve Anderson from Brothers in Rhythm for her tenth studio album X (2007). However it didn't make the final cut. Minogue wrote the song in 2007, along with many other songs while she was undergoing treatment for breast cancer. Minogue described the song as "a love song to the child I may or may not ever have." Musically, "Flower" is a pop ballad song, which features instrumentation of pianos, violins, drums and an acoustic guitar. The Quietus had declared the song a "dreamy ballad".

Many music critics had felt that the lyrical content deals with Minogue wanting to start a family and start motherhood but being unable to, as critics felt the lyric "Distant child, my flower. Are you blowing in the breeze? Can you feel me as I breathe life into you? I know one day you'll amaze me" was a strong meaning to motherhood.

== Reception ==
=== Critical response ===
"Flower" received generally positive reviews from music critics. PerezHilton.com complimented it as a "pretty track". Vibe had also complimented the songs "stunning lullaby". Sarah Deen from Metro.co.uk was very positive towards the song, saying "The song [Flower] definitely falls into the Kylie Minogue love songs category, with its wistful lyrics comparing a loved one to a gentle breeze." Herald Sun had called the song a "romantic ballad". Bradley Stern from Muumuse said "It’s gorgeous, and as I’ve said before, Kylie’s most vulnerable moment in years." He also noted that due to its low-promoted release, he said the song is "all strictly for the fans of course, but beautiful nonetheless." Jared from AllureofSound was very positive, awarding it 5 out of 5 stars and said "[Flower] is without a doubt one of Kylie’s greatest moments. The gorgeous vocal delivery on the track is perfectly complemented by the lush production."

However, Hitfix were more scathing towards the song, calling it "awful". Katie Hasty from HitFix was reviewing both "Flower" and her soundtrack song "Who We Are" and continued saying "Flower" only seems to refer exclusively to the late-1990s [...] Part of my attraction to her work in Holy Motors is the mix of lush arrangements and that girlish, sultry voice of hers. Maybe it's a good sign for her orchestral Abbey Road Sessions. But then again, previously unreleased "Flower" is on there, too. Quick, key change!"

=== Chart performance ===
In the United Kingdom, "Flower" was ruled ineligible to chart on the UK singles chart. This is because the song was served as a free download when the public pre-ordered The Abbey Road Sessions, and the inclusion criteria insists that song's can eligible to chart if its served as a digital download and CD single. However, when The Abbey Road Sessions was released, the song charted at number ninety-six on 4 November 2012. The song peaked at number thirty-one and thirty seven on the Ultratip Belgium Singles Chart (both Flanders and Wallonia). The song debuted at fifty-one on the Netherlands' singles chart.

== Music video ==
Directed by Kylie Minogue herself, she stated "I wanted to direct the video as I have always known how I wanted to illustrate the song." The music video was shot in Cornwall, England on 12 August 2012 and filmed in black and white. It featured Minogue lying on a chair with only a long white sheet covering her while looking through a mirror, Walking along a beach, wandering through woods and fields, walking along a tree trunk, playing on a swing, lying and sitting in a meadow of flowers and lying in a pool. Minogue wore a long, sheer white dress for the music video.

It was released on 25 September 2012 on YouTube as part of Minogue's 'K25' celebrations where her Twitter followers had to unlock the video by tweeting the hashtag '#KylieFlower' 25,000 times. In three days, the video got more than 1 million views on YouTube.

Bild noticed the similarities to the music video of "Where the Wild Roses Grow".

== Live performances ==
"Flower" was originally heard and performed in the set list for the KylieX2008 Tour, followed by a ballad version of the song, "I Believe in You", and then featured on the live DVD. In September 2012, Minogue performed the song on BBC Proms in the Park.

== Formats and track listings ==
- European and UK 2-track CD single
1. "Flower" – 3:34
2. "Flower" (Instrumental) – 3:34
- European and UK 7-inch picture disc; Digital download
1. "Flower" – 3:34

== Charts ==
Chart (2012)	Peak position
Belgium (Ultratip Bubbling Under Flanders)	21
Belgium (Ultratip Bubbling Under Wallonia)	37
CIS Airplay (TopHit)	127
Netherlands (Single Top 100)	51
UK Singles (Official Charts)	96

== Release history ==
Country	Date	Format	Label
Worldwide	25 September 2012	Digital download	Parlophone
Italy	28 September 2012	Contemporary hit radio	Warner Music
United Kingdom	12 November 2012	CD	Parlophone
United Kingdom	12 November 2012	7" vinyl	Parlophone
