= Steve Anderson (musician) =

British musician, songwriter and record producer

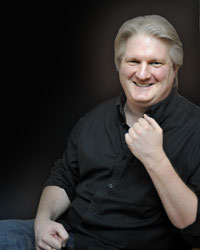
- Anderson at a show rehearsal in 2012

Background information
- Also known as: Steve Anderson
- Born: Stephen John Anderson; 1969 (age 56–57); Southend-on-Sea, England
- Genre: Pop
- Occupations: Record producer; songwriter; musical director; arranger
- Years active: 1990–present
- Label: Universal Publishing
- Member of: Brothers in Rhythm

Stephen John Anderson (born 1969 in Southend-on-Sea) is a British musician, songwriter and record producer. He is best known for his work with Kylie Minogue on her tours and albums, and as part of the production group Brothers in Rhythm. He has also worked on songs and albums for many recording artists such as Britney Spears, Westlife, Christophe Willem, Judie Tzuke and Susan Boyle.

== Life and career ==
=== Early years – Brothers in Rhythm ===
==== Remixes and releases ====
Steve Anderson began his musical career at DMC Studios as one half of remix/production team Brothers in Rhythm with Dave Seaman. They went on to work with artists including Michael Jackson, David Bowie, Janet Jackson, Sting and Paul McCartney. Anderson's role at DMC was initially as an apprentice or, as he described it, "tea-boy creating some mixes for their subscription service". Anderson's first remix for Kylie Minogue under the DMC label was her 1990 disco single "Step Back in Time".

Though this remix was not officially serviced, it has been suggested that it later provided inspiration for the successful Harding/Curnow remix of the single. Further, it would lead to Anderson collaborating with Minogue on her ballad "Finer Feelings" in 1991. Recalling the important influence of the band Massive Attack's music at the time, Anderson stated in an interview:

Finer Feelings came from someone at PWL loving what we were doing with Brothers in Rhythm, which up until then had been predominantly house music, so taking on a gorgeous mid tempo was quite a risk but of course we loved the song and just embellished what was there with a whole load of piano, strings and choir... On the original 1992 remix it was purely about making the rhythm section tougher and the orchestration more lush—everyone was influenced by Massive Attack then, so that's where we were headed.

This led to production work for the Pet Shop Boys, Take That (including the number one singles "Never Forget" and "Sure") and Minogue's debut album for Deconstruction Records in 1994, including "Confide in Me", which he co-wrote and produced. Extensively collaborating with Seaman, Brothers in Rhythm also had mainstream hits in their own right with "Peace and Harmony" (1990) and "Such a Good Feeling" (1991), the latter reaching number one on the Billboard Dance Club Songs chart. "Peace and Harmony" secured greater exposure when it re-appeared as the B-side to "Such a Good Feeling".

In 1994, the follow-up to "Such a Good Feeling", "Forever and a Day", was released in the UK via Stress Records, with vocals from Charvoni, charting at number 51.

==== Production work ====
Around the time of the Brothers in Rhythm release "Forever and a Day", Seaman and Anderson featured on the first Kylie Minogue album since leaving her label PWL. The two co-wrote and produced the first single, "Confide in Me", which went to number 2 in the UK charts and signified a "reinvention" of Minogue's image and sound. According to Lee Barron, he felt the image of the music video was an example and opening of "Indie Kylie"; an image that later progressed through the work of her 1997 album Impossible Princess. Brothers in Rhythm also produced four additional songs on the album—"Love Is Waiting", "Dangerous Game", "Automatic Love" and "Where Is the Feeling?". After the release of "Forever in a Day", Anderson and Seaman concentrated on writing, producing and recording Minogue's second album for Deconstruction Records/Sony BMG, Impossible Princess. Temporarily retitled Kylie Minogue in the UK and Europe following the death of Princess Diana, this was Minogue's sixth studio album, released on 22 October 1997 by Sony BMG and Deconstruction Records in Japan. Minogue had co-written all the songs on the album, with additional credits in production and composition; the album was also assisted by Dave Ball, Ingo Vauk, Brothers in Rhythm and Rob Dougan, among others.

The album received a polarized response from music critics. Commercially, the album reached number 10 in Australia, Scotland and the UK, but was certified Platinum by the Australian Recording Industry Association (ARIA) for physical shipment of 70,000 units.

After the release of Impossible Princess, Brothers in Rhythm continued to collaborate, having their remixes on single releases by D:Ream, M People, Placebo, Garbage and Alanis Morissette.

While the Brothers in Rhythm never officially split up, the beginning of the millennium saw Seaman concentrate on his DJ career while Anderson consolidated his career in music production, song-writing and theatre.

=== Production and songwriting ===
Steve Anderson has written and co-written songs and produced music for recording artists including Kylie Minogue, Britney Spears, Markus Feehily, Holly Valance, Take That, Susan Boyle and Delta Goodrem.

After completing Impossible Princess for Minogue in 1997, Anderson continued to write with Minogue for the album that became Light Years. Recalling a sense of freedom during the early period of recording in 1999, Anderson states:

The thing is, when we get together to write, we just do what we feel like. We never try to pitch at an album or sound, so often we write something we love that happily sits on a B-side, and that's fine with us. If you take something like Harmony for instance—the sun was shining at Real World and we just wanted to do something really bright, warm and summery with a lovely lyric. We knew there was no way it was going to fit on an album, but that's not a good enough reason not to write it.

Released in 2000 through Parlophone and widely seen as Minogue's comeback album, Light Years features three songs composed by Anderson ("So Now Goodbye", "Butterfly" and "Bittersweet Goodbye"). He also co-wrote "Dancefloor" and "Give It to Me" on the follow-up album Fever, which reached the number one slot in the UK, Australian, Austrian, German and Irish album charts and number 3 on the US Billboard 200.

Anderson also worked on songs for Britney Spears, including "Breathe on Me" for her 2003 album In the Zone and two unreleased songs ("State of Grace" and "Grow") originally intended for her album Blackout.

In 2003, he produced and co-wrote three songs for the Holly Valance album State of Mind, released on Warner Bros. Records. He also co-wrote and produced "Everything You Ever Wanted" for the English-Irish Pop girl group Girls Aloud's debut album Sound of the Underground.

In 2009, he produced "Talk Me Down" for the Irish boy band Westlife's Where We Are album. He also collaborated with Australian singer Natalie Bassingthwaighte on the song "Supersensual" for her number 1 selling album 1000 Stars. He co-wrote and produced the song "Entre Nous et le Sol" for French singer Christophe Willem's album Caféine, which was subsequently released as a single in 2010 with the English-language version of the album, Heartbox with the restored original title, State of Grace.

In 2010, he wrote and produced the song "I Will Reach You", which appeared as an album track on Westlife's Gravity album. In the same year he wrote the lead single to Spanish singer Edurne's album Nueva Piel, "Soy Como Soy".

In 2011, he reunited with Christophe Willem, producing his entire Prismophonic album.

In 2012, he also produced the English version of Willem's album, Love Shot Me Down. As part of Kylie Minogue's K25 celebrations, Anderson also produced The Abbey Road Sessions album, on which he co-wrote the single "Flower".

In 2013, he produced Susan Boyle's Home for Christmas album. In 2014 he produced Boyle's next album, Hope.

In 2015, he produced songs on Westlife's Markus Feehily album Fire and numerous songs for Kylie Minogue's Christmas album, Kylie Christmas.

In 2016, he wrote and produced Paola Iezzi's single "Lovenight". He also became heavily involved in the production, arrangement and release of new singer Harriet and her self-titled debut album. He also produced Boyle's Christmas album A Wonderful World, featuring covers of Madonna, Robbie Williams and ABBA songs. Anderson also produced Minogue's expanded re-release of her Christmas album, Kylie Christmas: Snow Queen Edition.

In 2018, he produced and wrote a couple of tracks on the solo debut album of Steps' singer Claire Richards. He also co-produced the debut album "Brave" by 15-year-old Beau Dermott with Cliff Masterson.

=== Music director – pop concert tours ===
Though its chart performance was somewhat lackluster, a key success of Kylie Minogue's Impossible Princess era was her live tour Intimate and Live in 1998. Performing to sell out shows in Australia and London, Minogue selected Anderson as its musical director for all corresponding concerts. This relationship continues with Anderson providing essential arrangement production work for Minogue's On a Night Like This (2001), KylieFever (2002), Money Can't Buy (2004), Showgirl: The Greatest Hits (2005), Showgirl: The Homecoming (2006–2007), KylieX2008 (2008–2009), For You, for Me (2009), Aphrodite: Les Folies (2011), Anti (2012), Kiss Me Once (2014–2015) and A Kylie Christmas (2015–2016) tours. Outside his live work for Minogue, Anderson has scored the live arrangements for tours and shows by Westlife, Delta Goodrem, Leona Lewis and most recently Lush in October 2016. He has also scored notable radio and TV shows including Live Lounge for Leona Lewis and Little Mix and An Audience with Kylie Minogue which featured a duet with Kermit the Frog.

=== Music supervisor – theatre ===
In 2007, alongside working on the Showgirl tour, Anderson and others from Kylie Minogue's creative team, including choreographer Ashley Wallen, vocal arranger Terry Ronald and creative director William Baker, opened their re-worked version of Jonathan Larson's musical Rent, Rent: Remixed at London's Duke of York's Theatre. The show starred Luke Evans, and Siobhan Donaghy as Mimi. While the show's stripped down adaptation drew criticism, Sam Marlow, theatre critic for the Times, stated:

Anderson has done a cracking job of funking up Larson's score, replacing overweening guitar rock with pumping gay club anthems and diva pop, flavoured with rippling keyboards and electronica.

The same creative team would reunite for several versions of The Hurly Burly Show, a burlesque revue playing at various West End theatres between 2010 and 2012, starring the British neo-burlesque performer Miss Polly Rae. The show was well received by theatre critics, with The Daily Telegraph's Charles Spencer giving it a four-star rating, noting the quality of the show's musical numbers, while The Guardian's Michael Billington praised its slick direction.

Three successful incarnations of the show led to further theatrical outings for Anderson. Collaborations to date include:

- Little Belter (London and UK Tour, 2012)
- Orchid – Where Desire Blooms (Miami, 2012)
- Some Girl I Used to Know (Leeds, London West End and UK Tour, 2014)
- The Supreme Fabulettes – Viva La Drag (London West End and UK Tour 2014–2015)
- Chandelier (Celebrity Cruises, 2015)
- Elyria (Celebrity Cruises, 2015).

In 2014, it was announced that Anderson was working on a new musical based on the music of Minogue. In September 2015 Minogue herself confirmed that the musical had "momentum" once again, after being "in talks". A successful trademark registration by Minogue's family company from 2012 indicates that the musical's working title is Lucky: The Kylie Minogue Musical.

Anderson is currently working on a new musical, The Most Beautiful Man In New York, with long time collaborators Ian Masterson and Terry Ronald.

== Discography ==
=== With Brothers in Rhythm ===
==== Singles ====
Title	Year	Peak chart positions					Album
Title	Year	UK	IRE	FRA	US Dance	US Dance Sales	Album
"Peace and Harmony"	1990	94	—	—	—	—	Non-album singles
"Such a Good Feeling"	1991	64	—	—	1	14	Non-album singles
"Such a Good Feeling" (reissue)	1991	14	27	50	—	—	Non-album singles
"Forever and a Day" (featuring Charvoni)	1994	51	—	—	11	53	Non-album singles
"—" denotes a recording that did not chart or was not released in that territory.

=== As producer and songwriter (selected discography) ===
Year (UK release)	Release	Artist	Format	Label	Song title(s)	Role
1992	"Make It On My Own"	Alison Limerick	Single	Arista	Make It On My Own	Writer and Producer
1994	Kylie Minogue	Kylie Minogue	Studio album	Deconstruction	Confide in Me	Writer and producer
1994	Kylie Minogue	Kylie Minogue	Studio album	Deconstruction	Dangerous Game	Writer and producer
1994	Kylie Minogue	Kylie Minogue	Studio album	Deconstruction	Automatic Love	Producer
1994	Kylie Minogue	Kylie Minogue	Studio album	Deconstruction	Love Is Waiting	Producer
1994	Kylie Minogue	Kylie Minogue	Studio album	Deconstruction	Where Is the Feeling?	Producer
1994	"Confide in Me"	Kylie Minogue	Single	Deconstruction	Confide in Me	Writer and producer
1995	"Where Is the Feeling?"	Kylie Minogue	Single	Deconstruction	Where Is the Feeling?	Producer
1997	"Some Kind of Bliss"	Kylie Minogue	Single	Deconstruction	Love Takes Over Me (B-side)	Writer and producer
1997	"Did It Again"	Kylie Minogue	Single	Deconstruction	Did It Again	Writer and Producer
1998	Impossible Princess	Kylie Minogue	Studio album	Deconstruction	Did It Again	Writer and Producer
1998	Impossible Princess	Kylie Minogue	Studio album	Deconstruction	Cowboy Style	Writer and Producer
1998	Impossible Princess	Kylie Minogue	Studio album	Deconstruction	Drunk	Writer and Producer
1998	Impossible Princess	Kylie Minogue	Studio album	Deconstruction	Dreams	Writer and Producer
1998	Impossible Princess	Kylie Minogue	Studio album	Deconstruction	Too Far	Producer
1998	Impossible Princess	Kylie Minogue	Studio album	Deconstruction	Say Hey	Producer
1998	Cowboy Style	Kylie Minogue	Single	Deconstruction	Cowboy Style	Writer and producer
1998	Cowboy Style	Kylie Minogue	Single	Deconstruction	Love Takes Over Me (B-side)	Writer and producer
2000	Hits+	Kylie Minogue	Compilation album	Deconstruction	Confide in Me	Writer and producer
2000	Hits+	Kylie Minogue	Compilation album	Deconstruction	Take Me With You	Writer and producer
2000	Hits+	Kylie Minogue	Compilation album	Deconstruction	Stay This Way	Writer and producer
2000	Hits+	Kylie Minogue	Compilation album	Deconstruction	Did It Again	Writer and producer
2000	Hits+	Kylie Minogue	Compilation album	Deconstruction	Automatic Love (acoustic version)	Producer
2000	Hits+	Kylie Minogue	Compilation album	Deconstruction	If You Don't Love Me	Producer
2000	Hits+	Kylie Minogue	Compilation album	Deconstruction	Where Is the Feeling	Producer
2000	"Spinning Around"	Kylie Minogue	Single	Parlophone Records	Cover Me with Kisses (B-side)	Writer and producer
2000	"Spinning Around"	Kylie Minogue	Single	Parlophone Records	Paper Dolls (B-side)	Writer and producer
2000	"On a Night Like This"	Kylie Minogue	Single	Parlophone Records	Ocean Blue (B-side)	Writer and Producer
2000	Light Years	Kylie Minogue	Studio album	Parlophone Records	Bittersweet Goodbye	Writer and producer
2000	Light Years	Kylie Minogue	Studio album	Parlophone Records	Butterfly	Writer
2000	Light Years	Kylie Minogue	Studio album	Parlophone Records	So Now Goodbye	Writer
2000	Please Stay	Kylie Minogue	Single	Parlophone Records	Good Life (B-side)	Writer and Producer
2000	Please Stay	Kylie Minogue	Single	Parlophone Records	Santa Baby (B-side)	Producer
2001	Fever	Kylie Minogue	Studio album	Parlophone Records	Give It To Me	Writer
2001	Fever	Kylie Minogue	Studio album	Parlophone Records	Dancefloor	Writer and Producer
2002	In Your Eyes	Kylie Minogue	Single	Parlophone Records	Never Spoken (B-side)	Writer and Producer
2002	In Your Eyes	Kylie Minogue	Single	Parlophone Records	Harmony (B-side)	Writer and Producer
2002	Feels So Good	Atomic Kitten	Studio album	Innocent	Feels So Good	Writer and Producer
2003	In the Zone	Britney Spears	Studio album	Jive Records	Breathe on me	Writer and Producer
2003	State of Mind	Holly Valance	Studio album	London Records	Hypnotic	Writer and Producer
2003	State of Mind	Holly Valance	Studio album	London Records	Curious	Writer and Producer
2003	State of Mind	Holly Valance	Studio album	London Records	Roll Over	Writer and Producer
2003	Sound of the Underground	Girls Aloud	Studio album	Polydor	Everything You Ever Wanted	Writer and Producer
2004	You Stood Up	V	Studio album	Universal	Stop the Tears	Writer
2004	Two Shots	Matt Dusk	Studio album	Decca	Don't Go Looking	Writer and Producer
2006	The Magic Roundabout: Music from the Motion Picture	Kylie Minogue	Soundtrack album	Milan Records	The Magic Roundabout	Vocal Producer
2007	''RyanDan'' (album)	RyanDan	Studio album	Universal Music	Entire album	Producer
2007	''RyanDan'' (album)	RyanDan	Studio album	Universal Music	Dentro Me	Writer and Producer
2007	''RyanDan'' (album)	RyanDan	Studio album	Universal Music	Stay With You	Writer and Producer
2007	''RyanDan'' (album)	RyanDan	Studio album	Universal Music	You Needed Me	Writer and Producer
2007	Showgirl: Homecoming Live	Kylie Minogue	Live Album	Parlophone	Entire Album	Producer
2007	Showgirl: Homecoming Live	Kylie Minogue	Live Album	Parlophone	Dreams	Writer and Producer
2007	Showgirl: Homecoming Live	Kylie Minogue	Live Album	Parlophone	Confide in Me	Writer and Producer
2007	Showgirl: Homecoming Live	Kylie Minogue	Live Album	Parlophone	Cowboy Style	Writer and Producer
2007	Radio 1 Established 1967	Various Artists	Compilation album	Universal Music	Kylie Minogue: Love Is The Drug	Vocal Producer
2008	Beautiful People (Soundtrack)	Various Artists	Compilation Album	EMI	Kylie Minogue and Dannii Minogue: The Winner Takes It All	Producer
2009	Where We Are	Westlife	Studio album	S, RCA, Sony Music	Talk Me Down	Producer
2009	1000 Stars	Natalie Bassingthwaighte	Studio album	Epic	Supersensual	Writer and Producer
2009	Caféine	Christophe Willem	Studio album	Columbia	Entre Nous et le Sol	Writer and Producer
2009	Live In New York	Kylie Minogue	Live Album	Parlophone	Entire album	Producer
2009	Live In New York	Kylie Minogue	Live Album	Parlophone	Confide in Me	Writer and Producer
2010	Now Is the Hour	Jennifer Rush	Studio album	Ariola	Ain't Loved You Long Enough	Writer and Producer
2010	Safe	Westlife	Single	Syco	Please Stay (B-side)	Producer
2010	Heartbox	Christophe Willem	Studio album	Columbia	State of Grace	Writer and Producer
2010	Gravity	Westlife	Studio album	Syco	I Will Reach You	Writer
2010	Gravity	Westlife	Studio album	Syco	Before It's Too Late	Writer
2010	Nueva Piel	Edurne	Single	Sony Music	Soy Como Soy	Writer
2010	Moon On A Mirrorball	Judy Tzuke	Compilation Album	Wrasse Records	If (When You Go)	Writer and Producer
2011	Cool	Christophe Willem	Single	Sony Music	Cool	Producer
2011	Prismophonic	Christophe Willem	Studio album	Sony Music	Si Mes Larmes Tombent	Writer and Producer
2011	Prismophonic	Christophe Willem	Studio album	Sony Music	Jamais Du	Writer and Producer
2011	Prismophonic	Christophe Willem	Studio album	Sony Music	Ennemis In L.O.V.E.	Writer and Producer
2011	Prismophonic	Christophe Willem	Studio album	Sony Music	Je Rejoins La Scene	Writer and Producer
2011	Prismophonic	Christophe Willem	Studio album	Sony Music	Le Temps Qu'il Reste	Writer and Producer
2011	Prismophonic	Christophe Willem	Studio album	Sony Music	Equilibre	Writer and Producer
2011	Prismophonic	Christophe Willem	Studio album	Sony Music	Cool	Producer
2012	The Abbey Road Sessions	Kylie Minogue	Orchestral compilation album	Parlophone	Entire Album	Producer
2012	The Abbey Road Sessions	Kylie Minogue	Orchestral compilation album	Parlophone	Flower	Writer and Producer
2012	The Abbey Road Sessions	Kylie Minogue	Orchestral compilation album	Parlophone	Confide in Me	Writer and Producer
2012	Flower	Kylie Minogue	Single	Parlophone	Flower	Writer and Producer
2013	Home for Christmas (Susan Boyle album)	Susan Boyle	Studio album	Syco	Entire Album	Producer
2014	Hope	Susan Boyle	Studio album	Syco	Wish You Were Here	Producer
2014	Hope	Susan Boyle	Studio album	Syco	I can Only Imagine	Producer
2014	Hope	Susan Boyle	Studio album	Syco	Angel	Producer
2014	Hope	Susan Boyle	Studio album	Syco	Abide With Me	Producer
2014	Hope	Susan Boyle	Studio album	Syco	Imagine	Producer
2014	Hope	Susan Boyle	Studio album	Syco	Will The Circle Be Unbroken	Producer
2014	Hope	Susan Boyle	Studio album	Syco	Bridge Over Troubled Water	Producer
2014	Hope	Susan Boyle	Studio album	Syco	The Impossible Dream	Producer
2014	Hope	Susan Boyle	Studio album	Syco	Oh Happy Day	Producer
2015	Fire	Markus Feehily	Studio album	Harmoney Entertainment	Love Is a Drug	Writer and Producer
2015	Fire	Markus Feehily	Studio album	Harmoney Entertainment	Sanctuary	Writer and Producer
2015	Fire	Markus Feehily	Studio album	Harmoney Entertainment	Only You	Writer and Producer
2015	Fire	Markus Feehily	Studio album	Harmoney Entertainment	Love Me Or Leave Me	Writer and Producer
2015	Fire	Markus Feehily	Studio album	Harmoney Entertainment	Wash The Pain Away	Writer
2015	Winter Stories	Harriet	Album	n/a	Entire Album	Producer
2015	Winter Stories	Harriet	Album	n/a	Maybe This Christmas	Writer and Producer
2015	Kylie Christmas	Kylie Minogue	Studio album	Parlophone, Warner Bros.	Entire Album	Producer
2015	Kylie Christmas	Kylie Minogue	Studio album	Parlophone, Warner Bros.	100 Degrees	Writer and Producer
2015	Kylie Christmas	Kylie Minogue	Studio album	Parlophone, Warner Bros.	Oh Santa	Writer and Producer
2015	Kylie Christmas	Kylie Minogue	Studio album	Parlophone, Warner Bros.	Christmas isn't Christmas 'Til You Get Here	Writer and Producer
2016	100 Degrees (Still Disco To Me)	Kylie Minogue and Dannii Minogue	Single	Parlophone	100 Degrees (Still Disco To Me)	Writer and Producer
2016	Lovenight	Paola Iezzi	Single	BMG Rights Management Italy	Lovenight	Writer and Producer
2016	Broken For You	Harriet	Single	Brightstar Records	Broken For You	Writer and Producer
2016	First And Last	Harriet	Single	Brightstar Records	First and Last	Writer and Producer
2016	Harriet	Harriet	Studio album	Brightstar Records	Entire Album	Producer
2016	Harriet	Harriet	Studio album	Brightstar Records	Afterglow	Writer and Producer
2016	Harriet	Harriet	Studio album	Brightstar Records	What's Mine Is Yours	Writer and Producer
2016	Harriet	Harriet	Studio album	Brightstar Records	Broken For You	Writer and Producer
2016	Harriet	Harriet	Studio album	Brightstar Records	Can I Keep You	Writer and Producer
2016	Harriet	Harriet	Studio album	Brightstar Records	First And Last	Writer and Producer
2016	Harriet	Harriet	Studio album	Brightstar Records	Permission To Kiss	Writer and Producer
2016	Harriet	Harriet	Studio album	Brightstar Records	Unlove You	Writer and Producer
2016	Harriet	Harriet	Studio album	Brightstar Records	Love Will Burn	Writer and Producer
2016	Harriet	Harriet	Studio album	Brightstar Records	Fly	Writer and Producer
2016	Harriet	Harriet	Studio album	Brightstar Records	Whoever You Are	Writer and Producer
2016	Kylie Christmas: Snow Queen Edition	Kylie Minogue	Studio album	Parlophone	It's The Most Wonderful Time Of The Year	Producer
2016	Kylie Christmas: Snow Queen Edition	Kylie Minogue	Studio album	Parlophone	Santa Claus Is Coming To Town	Producer
2016	Kylie Christmas: Snow Queen Edition	Kylie Minogue	Studio album	Parlophone	Winter Wonderland	Producer
2016	Kylie Christmas: Snow Queen Edition	Kylie Minogue	Studio album	Parlophone	Only You	Producer
2016	Kylie Christmas: Snow Queen Edition	Kylie Minogue	Studio album	Parlophone	Stay Another Day	Producer
2016	Kylie Christmas: Snow Queen Edition	Kylie Minogue	Studio album	Parlophone	Christmas Wrapping	Producer
2016	Kylie Christmas: Snow Queen Edition	Kylie Minogue	Studio album	Parlophone	Wonderful Christmastime	Producer
2016	Kylie Christmas: Snow Queen Edition	Kylie Minogue	Studio album	Parlophone	I'm Gonna Be Warm This Winter	Producer
2016	Kylie Christmas: Snow Queen Edition	Kylie Minogue	Studio album	Parlophone	100 Degrees	Producer
2016	Kylie Christmas: Snow Queen Edition	Kylie Minogue	Studio album	Parlophone	Let It Snow	Producer
2016	Kylie Christmas: Snow Queen Edition	Kylie Minogue	Studio album	Parlophone	2000 Miles	Producer
2016	Kylie Christmas: Snow Queen Edition	Kylie Minogue	Studio album	Parlophone	Santa Baby	Producer
2016	Kylie Christmas: Snow Queen Edition	Kylie Minogue	Studio album	Parlophone	Christmas Isn't Christmas 'Til You Get Here	Producer
2016	Kylie Christmas: Snow Queen Edition	Kylie Minogue	Studio album	Parlophone	Have Yourself A Merry Little Christmas	Producer
2016	Kylie Christmas: Snow Queen Edition	Kylie Minogue	Studio album	Parlophone	Oh Santa	Producer
2016	Kylie Christmas: Snow Queen Edition	Kylie Minogue	Studio album	Parlophone	Everybody's Free (To Feel Good)	Producer
2017	Christmas	Mark Feehily	Studio album	Harmoney Entertainment	Merry Christmas Baby	Producer
2017	Christmas	Mark Feehily	Studio album	Harmoney Entertainment	River	Producer
2017	Christmas	Mark Feehily	Studio album	Harmoney Entertainment	Have Yourself a Merry Little Christmas	Producer
2017	Christmas	Mark Feehily	Studio album	Harmoney Entertainment	This Christmas	Producer
2017	Christmas	Mark Feehily	Studio album	Harmoney Entertainment	Miss You Most at Christmas Time	Producer
2017	Christmas	Mark Feehily	Studio album	Harmoney Entertainment	O Holy Night	Producer
2017	Christmas	Mark Feehily	Studio album	Harmoney Entertainment	Silent Night (A Capella)	Producer
2017	Christmas	Mark Feehily	Studio album	Harmoney Entertainment	O Holy Night	Writer
2018	My Wildest Dreams (album)	Claire Richards	Studio album	Sony Music	Forever Ends With You	Producer
2018	My Wildest Dreams (album)	Claire Richards	Studio album	Sony Music	On My Own	Producer
2018	My Wildest Dreams (album)	Claire Richards	Studio album	Sony Music	End Before We Start	Producer
2018	My Wildest Dreams (album)	Claire Richards	Studio album	Sony Music	Deep Waters	Producer
2018	My Wildest Dreams (album)	Claire Richards	Studio album	Sony Music	Liar	Producer
2018	My Wildest Dreams (album)	Claire Richards	Studio album	Sony Music	Brave	Producer
2018	My Wildest Dreams (album)	Claire Richards	Studio album	Sony Music	My Wildest Dreams	Producer
2018	My Wildest Dreams (album)	Claire Richards	Studio album	Sony Music	Don't Leave Me in This Alone	Producer
2018	My Wildest Dreams (album)	Claire Richards	Studio album	Sony Music	End Before We Start	Writer
2018	My Wildest Dreams (album)	Claire Richards	Studio album	Sony Music	My Wildest Dreams	Writer
