= 100 Degrees =

2015 single by Kylie Minogue and Dannii Minogue

Single by Kylie Minogue and Dannii Minogue

from the album Kylie Christmas
- Released: 7 December 2015; 1 April 2016 ("Still Disco to Me")
- Recorded: 2015
- Studio: Angel Recording Studios (London, England); Sarm Music Village (London, England)
- Genre: Disco
- Length: 4:31; 3:47 ("Still Disco to Me")
- Label: Parlophone; Warner Music
- Songwriters: Kylie Minogue; Ash Howes; Richard Stannard; Steve Anderson
- Producers: Ash Howes; Richard Stannard; Steve Anderson

Kylie Minogue singles chronology
"Only You" (2015)	"100 Degrees" (2015)	"Every Day's Like Christmas" (2015)

Dannii Minogue singles chronology
"Summer of Love" (2015)	"100 Degrees" (2015)	"Holding On" (2017)

Studio video
- "100 Degrees" on YouTube

"100 Degrees" is a song recorded by Australian singer-songwriter Kylie Minogue, with her sister Dannii Minogue. The track was the second single from Kylie's album Kylie Christmas (2015). It was released on 7 December 2015 by Parlophone and Warner Bros. Records. A disco-influenced Christmas song, the track was written by Kylie, Ash Howes, Richard Stannard and Steve Anderson, with Howes, Stannard and Anderson handling production. An alternate version of the song was later released on 1 April 2016, "100 Degrees (Still Disco to Me)", omitting all references to Christmas in its lyrics.

Kylie wrote "100 Degrees" about adapting to a winter Christmas in the UK after being raised in Australia and was inspired by Donna Summer's vintage disco classics. Dannii said: "There's not enough party Christmas songs, everyone has Christmas parties, but what music do you put on? This song is perfect for dancing to."

Kylie announced that the song would serve as the second single during The X Factor Australia, with her and Dannii performing the song together for the grand finale. The song was also used by Target Australia for their Christmas commercials. The adverts starred Dannii Minogue, who has a fashion line with Target Australia. "100 Degrees" finished 2016 as the UK's seventeenth biggest selling vinyl of the year.

== Music video ==
The music video sees the pair recording the song and having fun in the studio, surrounded by tinsel, with Dannii donning 'Disco Christmas' T-shirt & Kylie donning a 'Kylie Kissmass' T-shirt.

== Reception ==
Mike Wass from Idolator said that "100 Degrees" was the album's highlight. Wass said "The siblings inject a whole lot of fabulous into the festive season with disco-tinged anthem" adding, "the duet is every bit as camp as you would expect."

== Live performances ==
Kylie confirmed that she would perform the track alongside Dannii, on the season 7 grand final on 24 November 2015. In a statement, Kylie said: "I'll be bringing a little Christmas cheer to The X Factor stage, I can't wait to come home and perform on the show with Dannii". The performance was their first performance together since their live performance of "Kids" on her Showgirl: The Homecoming Tour in 2006, and the first televised performance together since they performed "Sisters Are Doin' It for Themselves" on Young Talent Time in 1986.

== Formats and track listings ==
Digital download

1. "100 Degrees" (with Dannii Minogue; 7th Heaven Club Mix) – 6:49
2. "100 Degrees" (with Dannii Minogue; 7th Heaven Radio Edit) – 5:02
3. "100 Degrees" (with Dannii Minogue; Steve Anderson Classic Disco Extended Mix) – 7:24
4. "100 Degrees" (with Dannii Minogue; Boney Mix) – 5:44

100 Degrees (Still Disco to Me) – EP/12-inch clear vinyl

1. "100 Degrees (Still Disco to Me)" (with Dannii Minogue) – 3:47
2. "100 Degrees (Still Disco to Me)" (with Dannii Minogue; Steve Anderson Classic Disco Extended Mix) – 7:24
3. "100 Degrees (Still Disco to Me)" (with Dannii Minogue; 7th Heaven Club Mix) – 7:04
4. "100 Degrees (Still Disco to Me)" (with Dannii Minogue; Boney Remix) – 5:44

== Release history ==
Release history and formats for "100 Degrees"
Region	Date	Format(s)	Label(s)	Ref.
Outside US	7 December 2015	Digital download (Remix EP)	Parlophone	
Various	1 April 2016	Digital download ("Still Disco to Me" remix EP)	Parlophone	
Various	17 June 2016	Vinyl ("Still Disco to Me")	Parlophone	
