= At Christmas (song) =

2016 single by Kylie Minogue

Single by Kylie Minogue

from the album Kylie Christmas: Snow Queen Edition
- Released: 22 November 2016
- Studio: Kingstreet (Sweden); Healer (Denmark); Queensland (Australia); Cynosure Studio (Copenhagen, Denmark)
- Genre: Christmas; pop
- Length: 3:46
- Label: Parlophone
- Songwriters: Peter Wallevik; Daniel Davidsen; Patrick Joseph Devine
- Producers: Peter Wallevik Daniel Davidsen; Eric J

Kylie Minogue singles chronology
"Every Day's Like Christmas" (2015)	"At Christmas" (2016)	"Wonderful Christmastime" (2016)

Audio video
- "At Christmas" on YouTube

"At Christmas" is a song by Australian recording artist Kylie Minogue, from the 2016 Snow Queen Edition of her thirteenth studio album, Kylie Christmas (2015). The song was released on 22 November 2016 by Parlophone. It serves as the lead single from the reissue, and premiered on The Chris Evans Breakfast Show on BBC Radio 2. The song became BBC Radio 2's Record of the Week.

== Live performances ==
On 6 December, Minogue performed the song on Stasera Casa Mika and two days after on her Facebook page with the Warner Music Choir. On 10 December, was aired a performance of "At Christmas" on The Jonathan Ross Show.

== Release history ==
Region	Date	Format	Label	Ref.
Worldwide	22 November 2016	Digital download	Parlophone	

== Charts ==
=== Weekly charts ===
Weekly chart performance
Chart (2025)	Peak position
Lithuania Airplay (TopHit)	23

=== Monthly charts ===
Monthly chart performance
Chart (2025)	Peak position
Lithuania Airplay (TopHit)	83
