= The Abbey Road Sessions (Kylie Minogue album) =

2012 album by Kylie Minogue

Compilation album by Kylie Minogue
- Released: 24 October 2012
- Recorded: November 2011
- Studio: Abbey Road (London)
- Genre: Orchestral pop
- Length: 55:34
- Label: Parlophone
- Producers: Steve Anderson; Colin Elliot

Kylie Minogue chronology
| The Best of Kylie Minogue (2012) | The Abbey Road Sessions (2012) | Kiss Me Once (2014) |

Singles from The Abbey Road Sessions
- 1. "Flower" Released: 25 September 2012

The Abbey Road Sessions is an orchestral compilation album by Australian singer Kylie Minogue, released on 24 October 2012 by Parlophone. Primarily produced by Steve Anderson and Colin Elliot, the album features 16 tracks, all radically reworked, spanning Minogue's 25 years in the music industry. It was recorded at Abbey Road Studios in London with Minogue's band and a full orchestra during November 2011. Musically, the album leans toward orchestral music, featuring instrumentation such as guitars, pianos, strings and drums.

The album's only commercial single "Flower", was originally written in 2007 for Minogue’s album X but was not included at the time. The album received generally positive reviews from music critics, with many finding the recordings her best vocal delivery to date, while some dismissed her transition to orchestral music. Upon its release, the album entered the top 40 in countries including Minogue's native Australia, Ireland, Switzerland, France and New Zealand. The album peaked at number two in the United Kingdom, where it was certified Gold by the BPI. Minogue then went on to promote the album with live performances.

== Development and recording ==
Minogue made her live comeback at Abbey Road Studios in London on 11 November 2011, as part of a special showcase for EMI. She was accompanied by a 22-piece orchestra to perform the songs "All the Lovers" and "On a Night Like This". That same night, Minogue announced that her forthcoming studio album would celebrate 25 years since the release of her debut single "Locomotion" and would contain reworkings of some of her best known songs. She revealed: "I've been at Abbey Road for about two weeks in total. Not just for this, I've been working on a project for next year. Next year's my 25th anniversary so we've been recording acoustic and orchestral versions of a number of my hits".

On 21 October 2012, Minogue was interviewed on the production of the sessions saying, "It's exploring other avenues – but I don't think it takes me completely away from the dancefloor, because I'm still a sucker for that [...] But I think it just rounds things up, makes things more whole and satisfies a different place in me." Before recording at Abbey Road, she had started rehearsals "somewhere cheaper".

One of the songs that was recorded for the album that didn't make the final cut, "Breathe" was uploaded on Minogue's official YouTube account on 13 December 2012.

== Composition ==
The Abbey Road Sessions were primarily based on orchestral music. The album presented a more "dark", "fragile" and personal style. "Never Too Late" was described as a "sad, tender piano torch song". "Confide in Me" was mostly identified as the album's standout track, being described as a "Moroccan reinvention that swings from intimate to intense." "Hand on Your Heart" was also a highlight, but was generally compared to Jose Gonzales's version, which he covered back in 2006. "The Loco-Motion" was compared to the original version by Little Eva, which was recorded back in the '60s and was described as "playful essence retained on a cute and rockin' [...]"

For the album, Minogue requested Australian musician Nick Cave to re-record their duet single, "Where the Wild Roses Grow". It was noted as a highlight on the album for being more "stripped" than its "haunting, spare original." "Can't Get You Out of My Head" was cited as the "weirdest" on the album for displaying "weird, frenzied strings". The album's only new track, "Flower", was originally written by Minogue while she was recovering from her breast cancer diagnosis. The song was intended to be included on her X album, but was cut.

== Promotion ==
Minogue headlined BBC's Proms in the Park in September 2012 performing tracks from the album. In support of the release of the album, she performed The Abbey Road Sessions version of her previous singles in television shows and specials. On 27 October 2012, she performed "Never Too Late" on Friday Night with Jonathan Ross. On 18 November 2012, she performed "The Loco-Motion" on Strictly Come Dancing. On 19 November 2012, she performed "On a Night Like This" on Royal Variety Show. In December 2012, she performed "Can't Get You Out of My Head" on X Factor Italy and The X Factor UK. In December 2012, she performed "On a Night Like This" and "Can't Get You Out of My Head" on the Nobel Peace Prize Concert. On 21 December 2012, she performed "Come into My World" on Alan Carr: Chatty Man and the next month, the show aired Minogue's performance of "Better the Devil You Know". To promote the album in the United States, Minogue was interviewed on The Wendy Williams Show on 11 October 2012, performed "The Loco-Motion" on Dancing with the Stars on 13 November 2012 and on The Tonight Show with Jay Leno on 14 November 2012.

== Critical reception ==
Professional ratings
Aggregate scores
| Source | Rating |
|---|---|
| Metacritic | 68/100 |
Review scores
| Source | Rating |
| AllMusic | 3.5/5 stars |
| The A.V. Club | B |
| The Guardian | 4/5 stars |
| The Independent | 3/5 stars |
| musicOMH | 3/5 stars |
| The New Zealand Herald | 3.5/5 stars |
| NME | 3/10 |
| Slant Magazine | 3.5/5 stars |

The Abbey Road Sessions received generally positive reviews from music critics. At Metacritic, which assigns a normalised rating out of 100 to reviews from mainstream critics, the album received an average score of 68, based on 12 reviews, which indicates "generally favorable reviews". The Guardian's Caroline Sullivan said the more older songs on the album "sculpts them into grownup love songs sung by a Kylie who sounds [...] like a fortysomething woman who has encountered a few slings and arrows along the way." Matthew Horton of Virgin Media compared the album to Tori Amos and Pete Gabriel, writing that "[i]t's a brave gambit. Orchestral arrangements work well enough with the more expansive pop songs." He concluded, "Kylie's in warm, seductive voice. There's a touch of the nasal squeaks here and there, but that's just a hint of familiarity in an otherwise intriguing new adventure." Andy Gill of The Independent said the album worked out "impressively", calling it "a more traditional makeover, an attempt to give a more elegant lustre to callow pop kitsch, usually by slowing the song down and loading on strings." Jeff Katz from Idolator awarded the album four-and-a-half out of five, praising the reinvention of her collection stating "in terms of marketing, as the gorgeous orchestration sets great expectations for the album as a whole. And as weʼve come to expect from Kylie, she delivers."

Tim Sendra from AllMusic stated that the re-invention of the album consisted "class", that the reworked songs were "very effective" and that he'd enjoyed every song except "The Loco-Motion". He concluded: "(s)he's always been willing to take risks, and despite the initial thought that her music may not stand up to the orchestral treatment, The Abbey Road Sessions is another victory in a career full of them." Cameron Adams of the Herald Sun declared the album her most vocal driven album to date. Scott Kara of The New Zealand Herald opined "the hit-and-miss quality of the album doesn't matter one bit for the simple reason this is one for the fans—who will no doubt absolutely adore it, darling." Robert Copsey of Digital Spy wrote that "the whole record [...] shows a rarely-seen maturity in Kylie; and it suits her remarkably well", adding that the new reworks of the songs were "interesting". Annie Zaleski from The A.V. Club graded the album B, stating the album "makes a solid case for her longevity [...] these songs are transformed into timeless, classy compositions." Marc Hirsh from The Boston Globe stated the album fits in "neatly" to her K25 anniversary and "creates a palpable sense of physical space."

However, Simon Gage of the Daily Express stated that "[i]t's not that it's bad, just frankly a little daft" and also compared it to Tori Amos. John Meager of The Irish Independent wrote that Kylie "isn't a good enough singer to be able to shoulder a project like this" and the album "sadly [...] the whole thing falls flat on its face." Jon O'Brien of Yahoo! Music was more positive by writing "The Abbey Road Sessions doesn't always hit the mark. But it's an always intriguing and regularly enchanting concept which proves just how under-rated both Kylie's vocal ability and back catalogue is." Jenny Stevens of NME was more scathing, awarding it three out of ten, stating that "Confide in Me" is "worthwhile in an otherwise sorry array of pop bangers left soggy on the barbecue."

== Commercial performance ==
The Abbey Road Sessions debuted at two on the UK Albums Chart, selling 37,556 copies in its first week. The following week, the album slipped to number seven on sales of 17,395 copies. It was certified Gold by the British Phonographic Industry (BPI) on 16 November 2012, denoting shipments in excess of 100,000 copies. The album entered at number seven on the Australian Albums Chart and number three on the Australia Artist Albums Chart. However, the album slipped out the top 40 in its third week at number 44. The album entered at 39 on the New Zealand Albums Chart, but slipped off the chart the next week.

Elsewhere, the album generated moderate charting success. In Switzerland, the album debuted at number 17, until slipping out the top 50 in its third week. The album charted at number 54 in Austria for a sole week, becoming Minogue's least successful album in her Austrian charting discography. The album debuted at number 24 on the French Albums Chart, but fell out the top 100 in its third week. The album debuted at number 19 on the Spanish Albums Chart, but descended the rest of the way after its final peak. The album had longer success in Belgium than other European markets, peaking at numbers 22 and 31 on the Belgium Flanders and Belgium Wallonia charts.

== Singles ==
"Flower" was released as the first and only commercial single from the album on 25 September 2012. The song was originally written for Minogue’s tenth studio album, X (2007), but was ultimately not included. It received favourable reviews from music critics and reached the top 40 in both Belgian regions (Flanders and Wallonia), while charting outside the top 50 in the Netherlands. In the United Kingdom, the song was ineligible to chart until the release of The Abbey Road Sessions, after which it peaked at number 96 for one week on the UK Singles Chart.

"On a Night Like This" was issued as a promotional single in the United Kingdom and Europe to promote the album. The song was originally released as a single from Minogue’s seventh studio album, Light Years (2000).

"Can't Get You Out of My Head" received a limited radio-only release in select European countries, including France and Italy. In addition, "The Locomotion" was released exclusively in Japan as a promotional single. The original version of the song served as the lead single from her self‑titled debut album, Kylie (1988).

== Track listing ==
All tracks are produced by Steve Anderson and Colin Elliot, except "Flower", produced by Anderson.

| No. | Title | Writer(s) | Original album | Length |
|---|---|---|---|---|
| 1. | "All the Lovers" | Jim Eliot; Mima Stilwell | Aphrodite, 2010 | 3:22 |
| 2. | "On a Night Like This" | Steve Torch; Mark Taylor; Graham Stack; Brian Rawling | Light Years, 2000 | 3:00 |
| 3. | "Better the Devil You Know" | Mike Stock; Matt Aitken; Pete Waterman | Rhythm of Love, 1990 | 3:58 |
| 4. | "Hand on Your Heart" | Stock; Aitken; Waterman | Enjoy Yourself, 1989 | 3:36 |
| 5. | "I Believe in You" | Kylie Minogue; Scott Hoffman; Jason Sellards | Ultimate Kylie, 2004 | 2:48 |
| 6. | "Come into My World" | Cathy Dennis; Rob Davis | Fever, 2001 | 3:32 |
| 7. | "Finer Feelings" | Stock; Waterman | Let's Get to It, 1991 | 3:35 |
| 8. | "Confide in Me" | Anderson; Dave Seaman; Edward Barton | Kylie Minogue, 1994 | 4:08 |
| 9. | "Slow" | Minogue; Dan Carey; Emilíana Torrini | Body Language, 2003 | 4:08 |
| 10. | "The Locomotion" | Gerry Goffin; Carole King | Kylie, 1988 | 2:34 |
| 11. | "Can't Get You Out of My Head" | Dennis; Davis | Fever, 2001 | 3:33 |
| 12. | "Where the Wild Roses Grow" (with Nick Cave) | Cave | Murder Ballads, 1996 | 4:05 |
| 13. | "Flower" | Minogue; Anderson | | 3:31 |
| 14. | "I Should Be So Lucky" | Stock; Aitken; Waterman | Kylie, 1988 | 3:14 |
| 15. | "Love at First Sight" | Minogue; Richard Stannard; Julian Gallagher; Ash Howes; Martin Harrington | Fever, 2001 | 3:35 |
| 16. | "Never Too Late" | Stock; Aitken; Waterman | Enjoy Yourself, 1989 | 3:01 |
| Total length: | | | | 55:34 |

Australian JB Hi-Fi edition bonus track
| No. | Title | Writer(s) | Original album | Length |
|---|---|---|---|---|
| 17. | "Wow" | Minogue; Greg Kurstin; Karen Poole | X, 2007 | 3:04 |
| Total length: | | | | 58:38 |

Japanese and Australian David Jones edition bonus track
| No. | Title | Writer(s) | Original album | Length |
|---|---|---|---|---|
| 17. | "In My Arms" | Minogue; Calvin Harris; Stannard; Paul Harris; Julian Peake | X, 2007 | 3:41 |
| Total length: | | | | 59:14 |

== Personnel ==
Credits adapted from the liner notes of The Abbey Road Sessions.

=== Musicians ===
- Kylie Minogue – lead vocals
- David Tench – piano (tracks 1, 3–7, 10, 15, 16); electric piano (tracks 2, 9); B3 organ (track 8); keyboards (track 12)
- Tom Meadows – drums (tracks 1, 2, 4, 7–13, 15); percussion (tracks 7, 12)
- Dishan Abrahams – bass (tracks 1, 2, 4, 7, 10–13, 15); double bass (track 9)
- Luke Fitton – guitar (tracks 1–3, 5, 7–13, 15); acoustic guitar (track 4)
- Colin Elliot – guitar (tracks 1, 12, 15); percussion (tracks 1, 2, 7, 8, 10, 11, 13); strings arrangement (tracks 2, 14); brass arrangement (track 2)
- Roxy Rizzo – backing vocals (tracks 1–11, 13, 15)
- Abbie Osmon – backing vocals (tracks 1–11, 13, 15)
- Adetoun Anibi – backing vocals (tracks 1–11, 13, 15)
- Zalika King – backing vocals (tracks 1–11, 13, 15)
- Steve Anderson – strings arrangement (tracks 1, 5, 7, 11, 13); piano (tracks 12, 13); keyboards (track 13)
- Cliff Masterson – strings arrangement (tracks 1, 5, 7, 11, 13); conducting (tracks 1, 2, 5, 7, 11, 13, 14)
- Terry Ronald – backing vocal arrangement (tracks 1, 2)
- Trevor Mires – trombone (track 2)
- Tom Rees Roberts – trumpet (tracks 2, 10)
- Graeme Blevins – brass arrangement (track 2); sax, brass conducting (track 10)
- Sean Fitzpatrick – handclaps (track 10)
- Nick Cave – lead vocals (track 12)
- The Royal Philharmonic Orchestra – strings (track 13)
- Everton Nelson – string leader
- Nicky Sweeney, Richard George, Alex Afia, Tom Pigott-Smith, Simon Baggs, Emil Chakalov, Sonia Slany, Ian Humphries, Natalia Bonner, Steve Morris, Debbie Preece, Magnus Johnston, Peter Lale, Claire Finnimore, Rachel Robson, Chris Pitsilides, Katie Wilkison, Anthony Pleeth, Chris Worsey, Ian Burdge, Bozidar Vukotic, Chris Laurence, Stacey Watton – strings

=== Technical ===
- Steve Anderson – production
- Colin Elliot – production (tracks 1–12, 14–16); recording, engineering, mixing (all tracks)
- Pete Hutchings – recording, engineering
- Paul Pritchard – recording, engineering
- Geoff Pesche – mastering

=== Artwork ===
- William Baker – photography

== Charts ==
=== Weekly charts ===
| Chart (2012) | Peak position |
|---|---|
| Argentine Albums (CAPIF) | 12 |
| Australian Albums (ARIA) | 7 |
| Austrian Albums (Ö3 Austria) | 53 |
| Belgian Albums (Ultratop Flanders) | 22 |
| Belgian Albums (Ultratop Wallonia) | 31 |
| Croatian International Albums (HDU) | 23 |
| Czech Albums (ČNS IFPI) | 10 |
| Dutch Albums (Album Top 100) | 24 |
| French Albums (SNEP) | 24 |
| German Albums (Offizielle Top 100) | 31 |
| Greek Albums (IFPI Greece) | 61 |
| Irish Albums (IRMA) | 10 |
| Italian Albums (FIMI) | 23 |
| Japanese Albums (Oricon) | 110 |
| Mexican Albums (Top 100 Mexico) | 52 |
| New Zealand Albums (RMNZ) | 39 |
| Scottish Albums (Official Charts) | 2 |
| Spanish Albums (Promusicae) | 19 |
| Swiss Albums (Schweizer Hitparade) | 17 |
| Swiss Albums (Les charts Romandy) | 26 |
| UK Albums (Official Charts) | 2 |
| US Billboard 200 | 120 |

=== Year-end charts ===
| Chart (2012) | Position |
|---|---|
| Australian Artist Albums (ARIA) | 45 |
| UK Albums (OCC) | 57 |

== Certifications ==
| Region | Certification | Certified units/sales |
|---|---|---|
| United Kingdom (BPI) | Gold | 235,000 |

== Release history ==
| Region | Date | Format | Label |
|---|---|---|---|
| Japan | 24 October 2012 | CD, LP, digital download, limited edition | EMI |
| Australia | 26 October 2012 | CD, LP, digital download, limited edition | Warner Music Australia |
| Austria | 26 October 2012 | CD, LP, digital download, limited edition | EMI |
| Belgium | 26 October 2012 | CD, LP, digital download, limited edition | EMI |
| Finland | 26 October 2012 | CD, LP, digital download, limited edition | EMI |
| Germany | 26 October 2012 | CD, LP, digital download, limited edition | EMI |
| Ireland | 26 October 2012 | CD, LP, digital download, limited edition | EMI |
| Luxembourg | 26 October 2012 | CD, LP, digital download, limited edition | EMI |
| Netherlands | 26 October 2012 | CD, LP, digital download, limited edition | EMI |
| Norway | 26 October 2012 | CD, LP, digital download, limited edition | EMI |
| Switzerland | 26 October 2012 | CD, LP, digital download, limited edition | EMI |
| United Kingdom | 29 October 2012 | CD, LP, digital download, limited edition | Parlophone |
| Canada | 30 October 2012 | CD, LP, digital download, limited edition | EMI |
| Italy | 30 October 2012 | CD, LP, digital download, limited edition | EMI |
| Mexico | 30 October 2012 | CD, LP, digital download, limited edition | EMI |
| Spain | 30 October 2012 | CD, LP, digital download, limited edition | EMI |
| Sweden | 31 October 2012 | CD, LP, digital download, limited edition | EMI |
| United States | 6 November 2012 | CD, LP, digital download, limited edition | Astralwerks |
