= Greatest Remix Hits (album series) =

Remix albums by Kylie Minogue

- All the covers of the remix series vol. 1-4.

Remix album series by Kylie Minogue
- Released: 15 September 1998
- Recorded: 1987–1992
- Length: 129:34 (volume one); 133:08 (volume two); 126:20 (volume three); 99:26 (volume four)
- Label: Mushroom

Kylie Minogue chronology
Mixes (1998)	Greatest Remix Hits (1998)	Intimate and Live (1998)

Greatest Remix Hits is a series of remix albums by Australian recording artist Kylie Minogue. Vol. 3 peaked at number 67 on the ARIA albums chart while Vol. 4 peaked at number 66.

== Background and release ==
The series was distributed by Warner Music Australia.

Volumes 1 and 2 were originally released exclusively in Japan during 1993. In 1998, these volumes were re-released with revised cover art by Mushroom Records in Australia. With this re-issue, two new volumes were also released. The series contained rare and previously unavailable remixes by Minogue during her time with PWL.

One track included in this series, titled "I Am the One for You", was originally recorded during the "Rhythm of Love" sessions. It was unreleased before this series was issued.

== Track listings ==
All songs written by Mike Stock, Matt Aitken and Pete Waterman except where noted.

=== Greatest Remix Hits 1 ===
Disc one
No.	Title	Album	Length
1.	"I Should Be So Lucky" (The Bicentennial remix)	Kylie, 1988	6:11
2.	"Got to Be Certain" (Ashes to Ashes – The Extra Beat Boys remix)	Kylie, 1988	6:50
3.	"The Loco-Motion" (Alternate Sankie remix)	Kylie, 1988	6:54
4.	"Je Ne Sais Pas Pourquoi" (Moi Non Plus mix)	Kylie, 1988	5:53
5.	"Made in Heaven"	B-side of Je Ne Sais Pas Pourquoi, 1988	3:34
6.	"All I Wanna Do Is Make You Mine" (Extended version)	B-side of Especially For You, 1988	6:01
7.	"It's No Secret" (Alternate Extended version)	Kylie, 1988	5:33
8.	"Hand on Your Heart" (Dub)	Enjoy Yourself, 1989	5:32
9.	"Just Wanna Love You"	B-side of Hand of Your Heart, 1989	3:32
10.	"Never Too Late" (Extended version)	Enjoy Yourself, 1989	6:10
11.	"We Know the Meaning of Love" (Extended version)	B-side of Tears on My Pillow, 1990	5:51
Total length:			62:01

Disc two
No.	Title	Writer(s)	Album	Length
1.	"Step Back in Time" (Walkin' Rhythm mix)	Robert Bell; James Taylor	Rhythm of Love, 1990	7:59
2.	"What Do I Have to Do?" (Between The Sheets mix^{[a]})		Rhythm of Love, 1990	7:07
3.	"Shocked" (DNA 12" mix)		Rhythm of Love, 1990	6:15
4.	"Word Is Out" (Extended version)	Mike Stock; Pete Waterman	Let's Get to It, 1991	5:51
5.	"Keep on Pumpin' It" (Astral Flight mix)	Stock; Waterman; Minogue		6:52
6.	"If You Were with Me Now" (Extended version, duet with Keith Washington)	Kylie Minogue; Stock; Waterman; Keith Washington	Let's Get to It, 1991	5:10
7.	"Do You Dare?" (New Rave mix)		B-side of Give Me Just a Little More Time, 1992	6:38
8.	"Finer Feelings" (Brothers in Rhythm 7" mix)	Minogue; Stock; Waterman	Let's Get to It, 1991	3:49
9.	"Closer" (Edit)	Minogue; Stock; Waterman	B-side of Finer Feelings, 1992	3:57
10.	"What Kind of Fool (Heard All That Before)" (Tech No Logical mix^{[b]})	Minogue; Stock; Waterman	Greatest Hits, 1992	6:52
11.	"Celebration" (Have a Party mix)	Bell; Taylor	Greatest Hits, 1992	7:03
Total length:				67:33

=== Greatest Remix Hits 2 ===
Disc one
No.	Title	Writer(s)	Album	Length
1.	"Got to Be Certain" (Extended version)		Kylie, 1988	6:34
2.	"Kylie's Smiley Mix" (Extended version)		B-side of Never Too Late, 1989	6:20
3.	"Getting Closer" (7" version)		B-side of Locomotion, 1987	3:33
4.	"Je Ne Sais Pas Pourquoi" (The Revolutionary mix)		Kylie, 1988	7:14
5.	"Made in Heaven" (Made in England mix)		B-side of Je Ne Sais Pas Pourquoi, 1988	6:18
6.	"Especially for You" (Extended version)		Ten Good Reasons, 1989	5:00
7.	"Hand on Your Heart" (The Great Aorta mix)		Enjoy Yourself, 1989	6:24
8.	"Wouldn't Change a Thing" (Your Thang mix)		Enjoy Yourself, 1989	7:14
9.	"Tears on My Pillow" (More Tears mix)	Sylvester Bradford; Al Lewis	Enjoy Yourself, 1989	4:04
10.	"Better the Devil You Know" (Mad March Hare mix)		Rhythm of Love, 1990	7:04
11.	"I'm Over Dreaming (Over You)" (12" remix)		Enjoy Yourself, 1989	4:56
Total length:				64:41

Disc two
No.	Title	Writer(s)	Album	Length
1.	"Locomotion" (Girl Meets Boy mix)		A-side of Locomotion, 1987	3:13
2.	"What Do I Have to Do?" (The Pump and Polly mix)		Rhythm of Love, 1990	7:48
3.	"Shocked" (Harding/Curnow 12" mix)		Rhythm of Love, 1990	7:31
4.	"Say the Word – I'll Be There"	Stock; Waterman	B-side of Word Is Out, 1991	4:11
5.	"Keep on Pumpin' It" (Angelic remix)	Minogue; Stock; Waterman		7:22
6.	"Give Me Just a Little More Time" (12" version)	Ronald Dunbar; Edyth Wayne	Let's Get to It, 1991	4:34
7.	"Do You Dare?" (NRG mix)	Stock; Waterman	B-side of Give Me Just a Little More Time, 1992	7:03
8.	"Finer Feelings" (Brothers in Rhythm 12" mix)	Stock; Waterman	Let's Get to It, 1991	6:49
9.	"Closer" (The Pleasure mix)	Minogue; Stock; Waterman	B-side of Finer Feelings, 1992	6:48
10.	"What Kind of Fool (Heard All That Before)" (No Tech No Logical mix)	Minogue; Stock; Waterman	Greatest Hits, 1992	9:51
11.	"Got to Be Certain" (Out for a Duck, Bill, Platter Plus Dub mix)		Kylie, 1988	3:17
Total length:				68:27

=== Greatest Remix Hits 3 ===
Disc one
No.	Title	Writer(s)	Album	Length
1.	"Better the Devil You Know" (Movers and Shakers mix)		Rhythm of Love, 1990	7:44
2.	"Locomotion" (Chugga-Motion mix)		Kylie, 1988	7:37
3.	"Glad to Be Alive" (7" mix)		B-side of Locomotion, 1987	3:40
4.	"The Loco-Motion" (12" Master)		Kylie, 1988	9:12
5.	"Hand on Your Heart" (The Heartache mix)		Enjoy Yourself, 1989	5:22
6.	"Step Back in Time" (Harding/Curnow remix)		Rhythm of Love, 1990	6:45
7.	"What Do I Have to Do?" (Extended LP mix)		Rhythm of Love, 1990	8:08
8.	"Word Is Out" (Dub 1)	Stock; Waterman	Let's Get to It, 1991	3:54
9.	"No World Without You" (Original 7" mix)	Minogue; Stock; Waterman	Let's Get to It, 1991	2:54
10.	"Do You Dare?" (Italia 12" mix)	Minogue; Stock; Waterman	B-side of Give Me Just a Little More Time, 1992	5:21
Total length:				60:27

Disc two
No.	Title	Writer(s)	Album	Length
1.	"Especially for You" (Original 12" Mix)		Ten Good Reasons, 1989	4:57
2.	"Wouldn't Change a Thing" (Yo Yo's 12" Mix)		Enjoy Yourself, 1989	6:38
3.	"Never Too Late" (Oz Tour Mix)		Enjoy Yourself, 1989	5:05
4.	"Better the Devil You Know" (Dave Ford Remix)		Rhythm of Love, 1990	5:50
5.	"Step Back in Time" (Original 12" Mix)		Rhythm of Love, 1990	8:07
6.	"One Boy Girl" (12" Mix)	Minogue; Willie Wilcox	Rhythm of Love, 1990	4:56
7.	"Word Is Out" (Summer Breeze 12" Mix)	Stock; Waterman	Let's Get to It, 1991	7:45
8.	"Live and Learn" (Original 12" Mix)	Minogue; Stock; Waterman	Let's Get to It, 1991	5:56
9.	"Right Here, Right Now" (Tony King 12" Mix)	Minogue; Stock; Waterman	Let's Get to It, 1991	7:56
10.	"Finer Feelings" (Brothers in Rhythm Dub)	Stock; Waterman	Let's Get to It, 1991	4:09
11.	"Celebration" (Original 7" mix)	Bell; Taylor	Greatest Hits, 1992	4:34
Total length:				65:53

=== Greatest Remix Hits 4 ===
Disc one
No.	Title	Writer(s)	Album	Length
1.	"What Do I Have to Do?" (Movers and Shakers 12" mix)		Rhythm of Love, 1990	8:48
2.	"Locomotion" (The Girl Meets Boy mix)		Kylie, 1988	3:13
3.	"Made in Heaven" (Heaven Scent 12" mix)		B-side of Je Ne Sais Pas Pourquoi, 1988	5:45
4.	"Wouldn't Change a Thing" (Espagna mix)		Enjoy Yourself, 1989	5:47
5.	"Better the Devil You Know" (Alternative 7" mix)		Rhythm of Love, 1990	3:19
6.	"Things Can Only Get Better" (Original 12" mix)		Rhythm of Love, 1990	7:11
7.	"The Loco-Motion" (Kohaku mix)		Kylie, 1988	5:55
8.	"Let's Get to It" (Tony King 12" mix)	Minogue; Stock; Waterman	from Let's Get to It, 1991	5:59
9.	"What Kind of Fool (Heard All That Before)" (Pete Waterman's 12" Master mix)	Minogue; Stock; Waterman	Greatest Hits, 1992	6:50
Total length:				52:47

Disc two
No.	Title	Writer(s)	Album	Length
1.	"I Should Be So Lucky" (Extended mix)		Kylie, 1988	6:05
2.	"The Loco-Motion" (UK 7" version)		Kylie, 1988	3:13
3.	"Hand on Your Heart" (Smokin' remix)		Enjoy Yourself, 1989	5:33
4.	"I Am the One for You"		Rhythm of Love sessions, 1990	3:11
5.	"Step Back in Time" (Tony King remix)		Rhythm of Love, 1990	7:30
6.	"Too Much of a Good Thing" (Original 12" mix)	Minogue; Stock; Waterman; Washington	Let's Get to It, 1991	5:52
7.	"If You Were with Me Now" (Orchestral version, duet with Keith Washington)	Minogue; Stock; Waterman; Washington	Let's Get to It, 1991	3:11
8.	"Finer Feelings" (Brothers in Rhythm Ambient reprise)	Stock; Waterman	Let's Get to It, 1991	3:58
9.	"Celebration" (AKA Good Times mix)	Bell; Taylor	Greatest Hits, 1992	8:06
Total length:				46:39

=== Notes ===
- ^{^a} mistitled and replaced by album version on digital release.
- ^{^b} mistitled and replaced by No Tech No Logical Mix on digital release.

== Charts ==
Chart performance for Greatest Remix Hits Volume 3
Chart (1998)	Peak position
Australian Albums (ARIA)	67

Chart performance for Greatest Remix Hits Volume 4
Chart (1998)	Peak position
Australian Albums (ARIA)	66
