= Kylie's Non-Stop History 50+1 =

1993 album by Kylie Minogue

Remix album by Kylie Minogue
- Released: 1 July 1993
- Recorded: 1987–1992
- Studio: Various
- Genre: Dance-pop
- Length: 75:42
- Labels: Mushroom; PWL
- Producers: Stock Aitken Waterman; Visionmasters; Tony King; Keith Cohen; Phil Harding; Ian Curnow; MST

Kylie Minogue chronology
Greatest Hits (1992)	Kylie's Non-Stop History 50+1 (1993)	Kylie Minogue (1994)

Kylie's Non-Stop History 50+1 is the first remix album by Australian singer Kylie Minogue. It was initially released on 1 July 1993 in Japan, three months prior to its distribution in the United Kingdom through Pete Waterman Entertainment (PWE), whereas Australia made it later in 1994, issued by Mushroom Records. The album contained clips of most of Minogue's songs during her PWL period plus the Techno Rave Remix of "Celebration", which was exclusively released in Japan. All the tracks except "Celebration" (Techno Rave Remix) run into each other, creating a megamix. Peaking at number 59 on Oricon Albums Chart, the album spent 3 weeks charting and has garnered over 13,600 copies in Japan. It also peaked at number 57 in Australia in 1994. The cover art was shot by British photographer, Katerina Jebb.

== Critical reception ==
Professional ratings
Review scores
Source	Rating
AllMusic	4/5 stars

The album received favorable reviews. Chris True from All Music website praise the album for focus in Kylie's entire songs' catalogue and pointing that if the public "don't want to be bothered looking for all the individual albums, or want to get more of your money's worth for her early work, this is the one."

== Track listing ==
All songs written and produced by Mike Stock, Matt Aitken and Pete Waterman except where noted.

No.	Title	Writer(s)	Producer(s)	Length
1.	"Do You Dare?" (B-side from "Give Me Just a Little More Time", 1992)	Mike Stock; Pete Waterman; Kylie Minogue	Stock; Waterman	2:22
2.	"I Guess I Like It Like That / Keep on Pumpin' It" (from Let's Get to It, 1991)	Stock; Waterman; Minogue; Phil Wilde; Jean-Paul de Coster	Stock; Waterman	2:16
3.	"Closer" (B-side from "Finer Feelings", 1992)	Stock; Waterman; Minogue	Stock; Waterman	1:00
4.	"Shocked" (from Rhythm of Love, 1990)			1:25
5.	"Things Can Only Get Better" (from Rhythm of Love, 1990)			1:08
6.	"What Do I Have to Do?" (from Rhythm of Love, 1990)			1:27
7.	"Better the Devil You Know" (from Rhythm of Love, 1990)			1:15
8.	"What Kind of Fool (Heard All That Before)" (from Greatest Hits, 1992)	Stock; Waterman; Minogue	Stock; Waterman	1:51
9.	"Secrets" (from Rhythm of Love, 1990)			1:06
10.	"Where in the World?" (from Greatest Hits, 1992)	Stock; Waterman; Minogue	Stock; Waterman	1:04
11.	"Give Me Just a Little More Time" (from Let's Get to It, 1991)	Ronald Dunbar; Edyth Wayne	Stock; Waterman	0:56
12.	"I Miss You" (from Kylie, 1988)			1:18
13.	"Step Back in Time" (from Rhythm of Love, 1990)			1:27
14.	"Celebration"	Robert Bell; James Taylor	Phil Harding; Ian Curnow	1:40
15.	"Right Here, Right Now" (from Let's Get to It, 1991)	Stock; Waterman; Minogue	Stock; Waterman	1:09
16.	"Always Find the Time" (from Rhythm of Love, 1990)	Stock Aitken Waterman; Rick James		1:18
17.	"Look My Way" (from Kylie, 1988)			1:14
18.	"Count the Days" (from Rhythm of Love, 1990)	Minogue; Stephen Bray	Bray; Keith Cohen	1:14
19.	"One Boy Girl" (from Rhythm of Love, 1990)	Minogue; Willie Wilcox	Cohen	1:31
20.	"Rhythm of Love" (from Rhythm of Love, 1990)	Minogue; Bray	Bray; Cohen	1:15
21.	"Word Is Out" (from Let's Get to It, 1991)	Stock; Waterman	Stock; Waterman	1:17
22.	"Just Wanna Love You" (B-side from "Hand on Your Heart", 1989)			1:31
23.	"It's No Secret" (from Kylie, 1988)			1:20
24.	"I'll Still Be Loving You" (from Kylie, 1988)			1:28
25.	"Let's Get to It" (from Let's Get to It, 1991)	Stock; Waterman	Stock; Waterman	1:25
26.	"Too Much of a Good Thing" (from Let's Get to It, 1991)	Stock; Waterman; Minogue	Stock; Waterman	1:22
27.	"Live and Learn" (from Let's Get to It, 1991)	Stock; Waterman; Minogue	Stock; Waterman	1:16
28.	"Finer Feelings" (from Let's Get to It, 1991)	Stock; Waterman	Stock; Waterman; Brothers in Rhythm	1:27
29.	"The World Still Turns" (from Rhythm of Love, 1990)	Minogue; Michael Jay; Mark Leggett	Jay	1:23
30.	"My Secret Heart" (from Enjoy Yourself, 1989)			1:09
31.	"No World Without You" (from Let's Get to It, 1991)	Stock; Waterman; Minogue	Stock; Waterman	1:14
32.	"Especially for You" (with Jason Donovan, from Ten Good Reasons, 1989)			1:52
33.	"Say the Word – I'll Be There" (B-side from "Word Is Out", 1991)	Stock; Waterman	Stock; Waterman	0:57
34.	"Tears on My Pillow" (from Enjoy Yourself, 1989)	Sylvester Bradford; Al Lewis		1:29
35.	"Tell Tale Signs" (from Enjoy Yourself, 1989)			1:27
36.	"If You Were with Me Now" (with Keith Washington, from Let's Get to It, 1991)	Stock; Waterman; Minogue; Keith Washington	Stock; Waterman	1:10
37.	"Heaven and Earth" (from Enjoy Yourself, 1989)			1:14
38.	"Nothing to Lose" (from Enjoy Yourself, 1989)			1:09
39.	"Wouldn't Change a Thing" (from Enjoy Yourself, 1989)			1:37
40.	"Je ne sais pas pourquoi" (from Kylie, 1988)			1:10
41.	"Made in Heaven" (B-side from "Je ne sais pourquoi", 1988)			1:20
42.	"Hand on Your Heart" (from Enjoy Yourself, 1989)			1:18
43.	"Enjoy Yourself" (from Enjoy Yourself, 1989)			1:16
44.	"I'm Over Dreaming (Over You)" (from Enjoy Yourself, 1989)			1:17
45.	"Never Too Late" (from Enjoy Yourself, 1989)			1:34
46.	"Love at First Sight" (from Kylie, 1988)			1:34
47.	"Got to Be Certain" (from Kylie, 1988)			1:29
48.	"Turn It into Love" (from Kylie, 1988)			1:22
49.	"I Should Be So Lucky" (from Kylie, 1988)			1:28
50.	"The Loco-Motion" (from Kylie, 1988)	Gerry Goffin; Carole King		1:28
51.	"Celebration" (Techno Rave Mix; bonus track)	Bell; Taylor	Harding; Curnow	6:43
Total length:				75:42

== Personnel ==
Credits adapted from the album's liner notes.

- Kylie Minogue – lead vocals, backing vocals
- Jason Donovan – vocals (track 32)
- Keith Washington – vocals (track 36)
- Mike Stock – producer (except tracks 14, 18–20, 51)
- Pete Waterman – producer (except tracks 14, 18–20, 51)
- Matt Aiken – producer (except tracks 14, 18–20, 51 all tracks from Let's To Get It)
- Tony King – producer (track 2)
- Visionmasters – producer (track 2)
- Phil Harding – producer (track 14, 51)
- Ian Curnow – producer (track 14, 51)
- Keith Cohen – producer (track 18–20)
- MST – remixer, producer
- Eiji Adachi – art direction
- Masakazu 'Hiro' Hiroishi – coordinator, concept direction
- Katerina Jebb – photography
- Hiromi Shimizu – design
- Kakako Hashimoto – design

== Charts ==
Chart (1993)	Peak position
Japanese Albums (Oricon)	59
Chart (1994)	Peak position
Australian Albums (ARIA)	57

== Release history ==
Release dates and formats for Kylie's Non-Stop History 50+1
Region	Date	Format(s)	Distributor(s)	Ref(s).
Japan	1 July 1993	Cassette; CD	Alfa	
United Kingdom	October 1993	Cassette; CD	PWL	
Various	1993	Cassette; CD	PWL	
Australia	1994	Cassette; CD	Mushroom	
Various	1998 (reissue)	CD	PWL; Mushroom	
