= Greatest Hits (1992 Kylie Minogue album) =

1992 album by Kylie Minogue

Greatest hits album by Kylie Minogue
- Released: 24 August 1992
- Recorded: 1987–1992
- Genre: Dance-pop
- Length: 77:47
- Label: Mushroom; PWL
- Producer: Stock Aitken Waterman; DNA; Phil Harding; Ian Curnow

Kylie Minogue chronology
Let's Get to It (1991)	Greatest Hits (1992)	Kylie's Non-Stop History 50+1 (1993)

Kylie Minogue video chronology
Live! (1992)	Greatest Video Hits (1992)	The Kylie Tapes: 94–98 (1998)

Singles from Greatest Hits
- 1. "What Kind of Fool (Heard All That Before)" Released: 10 August 1992; 2. "Celebration" Released: 16 November 1992

Greatest Hits is the first greatest hits album by Australian singer Kylie Minogue. The album was released on 24 August 1992 as Minogue's final release under Pete Waterman Limited (PWL). The record contains nineteen singles from the singer's first four studio albums, as well as three new songs recorded specifically for inclusion on this album. The album was largely written and produced by the Stock Aitken Waterman team, and its release marked the end of Minogue's professional relationship with them. It contained all her single releases to date including the Japan-only single, "Turn It into Love", featured on Minogue's 1988 debut album.

Greatest Hits entered the UK Albums Chart at number one, becoming Minogue's third number-one album in the United Kingdom. It charted there for eleven weeks and was later certified platinum for shipments of 300,000 copies. The album was also successful in Australia, debuting and peaking at number three and charting for fifteen weeks. It was later certified platinum for shipments exceeding 70,000 copies, by Australian Recording Industry Association. The album is Minogue's third number one album in the United Kingdom, after Kylie (1988) and Enjoy Yourself (1989).

This compilation was superseded by 2004's Ultimate Kylie collection, with only seven tracks not being included on that 2-CD set and, later, by 2019's Step Back in Time: The Definitive Collection, with only three tracks not being included on the expanded, 3-CD version of the latter. Following her release from PWL, she stated that she felt stifled by Stock, Aitken and Waterman, saying, "I was very much a puppet in the beginning. I was blinkered by my record company. I was unable to look left or right."

== Release ==
The album was promoted with two singles, "What Kind of Fool (Heard All That Before)" and "Celebration", originally a hit for Kool & The Gang in 1980. In Australia, the album was released with completely different artwork and was available as a limited edition digi-pack. A limited edition was also available in Australia with the Kylie's Non-Stop History 50+1 remix album as a bonus disc and the original album was later re-issued again with the original UK artwork in 1998. An accompanying video compilation called Greatest Video Hits was released alongside the album. The video featured all Minogue's music videos to date except the in-house promo video for "Made in Heaven". The Australian version keeps the original title, Greatest Hits, and was released with the same cover as the Australian edition of its audio counterpart. The Japanese Laserdisc edition also includes the video for "Celebration". In the 2009 iTunes re-release, the single versions of the tracks have been put in place of the album versions, including a rare single version of "It's No Secret" put in place of the original album version. The album was re-issued again in 2011 with an altered track list for the South African leg of Minogue's Aphrodite World Tour.

=== Singles ===
Professional ratings
Review scores
Source	Rating
AllMusic	4.5/5 stars
Encyclopedia of Popular Music	3/5 stars
Select	3/5 medals

The first single was "What Kind of Fool (Heard All That Before)". It was released in the United Kingdom in August 1992 and peaked at number fourteen in the UK Singles Chart. The release was backed with the fan-favourite "Things Can Only Get Better". The second and final single was "Celebration", a cover of Kool & the Gang's hit. It was released in November 1992 and peaked at number twenty on the UK Singles Chart. It was also Minogue's last single for PWL.

== Track listing ==
All songs written and produced by Mike Stock, Matt Aitken and Pete Waterman except where noted.

Greatest Hits – Standard edition
No.	Title	Writer(s)	Producer(s)	Length
1.	"I Should Be So Lucky" (from Kylie, 1988)			3:23
2.	"Got to Be Certain" (from Kylie)			3:20
3.	"The Loco-Motion" (from Kylie)	Gerry Goffin; Carole King		3:14
4.	"Je Ne Sais Pas Pourquoi" (from Kylie)			4:01
5.	"Especially for You" (with Jason Donovan, from Ten Good Reasons, 1989)			3:58
6.	"Turn It into Love" (from Kylie)			3:36
7.	"It's No Secret" (from Kylie)			3:59
8.	"Hand on Your Heart" (from Enjoy Yourself, 1989)			3:51
9.	"Wouldn't Change a Thing" (from Enjoy Yourself)			3:14
10.	"Never Too Late" (from Enjoy Yourself)			3:23
11.	"Tears on My Pillow" (from Enjoy Yourself)	Sylvester Bradford; Al Lewis		2:28
12.	"Better the Devil You Know" (from Rhythm of Love, 1990)			3:55
13.	"Step Back in Time" (from Rhythm of Love)			3:05
14.	"What Do I Have to Do" (from Rhythm of Love)			3:44
15.	"Shocked" (DNA 7" mix featuring Jazzi P, from Rhythm of Love)	Mike Stock; Matt Aitken; Pete Waterman; Pauline Bennett	Stock Aitken Waterman; DNA	3:10
16.	"Word Is Out" (from Let's Get to It, 1991)	Stock; Waterman	Stock; Waterman	3:35
17.	"If You Were with Me Now" (with Keith Washington, from Let's Get to It)	Stock; Waterman; Kylie Minogue; Keith Washington	Stock; Waterman	3:11
18.	"Give Me Just a Little More Time" (from Let's Get to It)	Ronald Dunbar; Edyth Wayne	Stock; Waterman	3:07
19.	"Finer Feelings" (from Let's Get to It)	Stock; Waterman	Stock; Waterman	3:53
20.	"What Kind of Fool (Heard All That Before)"	Stock; Waterman; Minogue	Stock; Waterman	3:41
21.	"Where in the World?"	Stock; Waterman; Minogue	Stock; Waterman	3:34
22.	"Celebration"	Robert Bell; James Taylor	Phil Harding; Ian Curnow	3:57
Total length:				77:26

Greatest Hits – 1997 Repackage of Greatest Hits and Kylie's Non-Stop History 50+1.
No.	Title	Length
1.	"Do You Dare"	2:22
2.	"I Guess I Like It Like That" (and "Keep on Pumpin' It")	2:16
3.	"Closer"	1:00
4.	"Shocked"	1:25
5.	"Things Can Only Get Better"	1:08
6.	"What Do I Have to Do?"	1:27
7.	"Better the Devil You Know"	1:15
8.	"What Kind of Fool (Heard All That Before)"	1:51
9.	"Secrets"	1:06
10.	"Where in the World?"	1:04
11.	"Give Me Just a Little More Time"	0:56
12.	"I Miss You"	1:18
13.	"Step Back in Time"	1:27
14.	"Celebration"	1:40
15.	"Right Here, Right Now"	1:09
16.	"Always Find the Time"	1:18
17.	"Look My Way"	1:14
18.	"Count the Days"	1:14
19.	"One Boy Girl"	1:31
20.	"Rhythm of Love"	1:15
21.	"Word Is Out"	1:17
22.	"Just Wanna Love You"	1:31
23.	"It's No Secret"	1:20
24.	"I'll Still Be Loving You"	1:28
25.	"Let's Get to It"	1:25
26.	"Too Much of a Good Thing"	1:22
27.	"Live and Learn"	1:16
28.	"Finer Feelings"	1:27
29.	"The World Still Turns"	1:23
30.	"My Secret Heart"	1:09
31.	"No World Without You"	1:14
32.	"Especially for You" (with Jason Donovan)	1:52
33.	"Say the Word – I'll Be There"	0:57
34.	"Tears on My Pillow"	1:29
35.	"Tell Tale Signs"	1:27
36.	"If You Were with Me Now" (with Keith Washington)	1:10
37.	"Heaven and Earth"	1:14
38.	"Nothing to Lose"	1:09
39.	"Wouldn't Change a Thing"	1:37
40.	"Je Ne Sais Pas Pourquoi"	1:10
41.	"Made in Heaven"	1:20
42.	"Hand on Your Heart"	1:18
43.	"Enjoy Yourself"	1:16
44.	"I'm Over Dreaming (Over You)"	1:17
45.	"Never Too Late"	1:34
46.	"Love at First Sight"	1:34
47.	"Got to Be Certain"	1:29
48.	"Turn It into Love"	1:22
49.	"I Should Be So Lucky"	1:28
50.	"The Loco-Motion"	1:28
51.	"Celebration" (Techno Rave Mix)	6:43
Total length:		75:42

Greatest Hits – iTunes edition
No.	Title	Writer(s)	Producer(s)	Length
1.	"I Should Be So Lucky"			3:23
2.	"Got to Be Certain"			3:20
3.	"The Loco-Motion" (7" mix)	Goffin; King		3:12
4.	"Je Ne Sais Pas Pourquoi"			4:01
5.	"Especially for You" (with Jason Donovan)			3:58
6.	"Turn It into Love"			3:36
7.	"It's No Secret" (7" mix)			3:33
8.	"Hand on Your Heart"			3:51
9.	"Wouldn't Change a Thing"			3:14
10.	"Never Too Late"			3:23
11.	"Tears on My Pillow"	Bradford; Lewis		2:28
12.	"Better the Devil You Know"			3:55
13.	"Step Back in Time"			3:05
14.	"What Do I Have to Do" (7" mix)			3:34
15.	"Shocked" (DNA 7" mix featuring Jazzi P)	Stock; Aitken; Waterman; Bennett	Stock Aitken Waterman; DNA	3:10
16.	"Word Is Out"	Stock; Waterman	Stock; Waterman	3:35
17.	"If You Were with Me Now" (with Keith Washington)	Stock; Waterman; Minogue; Washington	Stock; Waterman	3:11
18.	"Give Me Just a Little More Time"	Wayne; Dunbar	Stock; Waterman	3:07
19.	"Finer Feelings" (Brothers in Rhythm 7" mix)	Stock; Waterman	Stock; Waterman; Brothers in Rhythm	3:45
20.	"What Kind of Fool (Heard All That Before)"	Stock; Waterman; Minogue	Stock; Waterman	3:41
21.	"Where in the World?"	Stock; Waterman; Minogue	Stock; Waterman	3:34
22.	"Celebration"	Bell; Taylor	Harding; Curnow	3:57

Greatest Hits – South African 2011 version
No.	Title	Writer(s)	Producer(s)	Length
1.	"I Should Be So Lucky"			3:23
2.	"Got to Be Certain"			3:20
3.	"The Loco-Motion" (7" mix)	Goffin; King		3:13
4.	"Je Ne Sais Pas Pourquoi"			4:01
5.	"Especially for You" (with Jason Donovan)			3:58
6.	"Hand on Your Heart"			3:51
7.	"Wouldn't Change a Thing"			3:14
8.	"Never Too Late"			3:23
9.	"Tears on My Pillow"	Bradford; Lewis		2:28
10.	"Better the Devil You Know"			3:55
11.	"Step Back in Time"			3:05
12.	"What Do I Have to Do" (7" mix)			3:34
13.	"Shocked" (DNA 7" mix featuring Jazzi P)	Stock; Aitken; Waterman; Bennett	Stock Aitken Waterman; DNA	3:10
14.	"Word Is Out"	Stock; Waterman	Stock; Waterman	3:35
15.	"If You Were with Me Now" (with Keith Washington)	Stock; Waterman; Minogue; Washington	Stock; Waterman	3:11
16.	"Give Me Just a Little More Time"	Wayne; Dunbar	Stock; Waterman	3:07
17.	"Finer Feelings" (Brothers in Rhythm 7" mix)	Stock; Waterman	Stock; Waterman; Brothers in Rhythm	3:45
18.	"What Kind of Fool (Heard All That Before)"	Stock; Waterman; Minogue	Stock; Waterman	3:41
19.	"Celebration"	Bell; Taylor	Harding; Curnow	3:57

Greatest Hits – South African 2011 version bonus track
No.	Title	Length
20.	"What Do I Have to Do" (Billy The Fish Mix)	7:30

Greatest Video Hits – Standard edition
No.	Title	Director(s)	Length
1.	"I Should Be So Lucky"	Chris Langman	3:23
2.	"Got to Be Certain"	Langman	3:20
3.	"The Loco-Motion" (7" mix)	Langman	3:18
4.	"Je Ne Sais Pas Pourquoi"	Langman	4:22
5.	"It's No Secret"	Langman	4:43
6.	"Especially for You" (with Jason Donovan)	Langman	3:37
7.	"Hand on Your Heart" (video mix)	Langman	3:43
8.	"Wouldn't Change a Thing"	Pete Cornish	3:14
9.	"Never Too Late"	Cornish	3:23
10.	"Tears on My Pillow"	Cornish	2:28
11.	"Better the Devil You Know"	Paul Goldman	3:55
12.	"Step Back in Time"	Nick Egan	3:05
13.	"What Do I Have to Do" (7" mix)	Dave Hogan	3:44
14.	"Shocked" (DNA 7" mix)	Hogan	3:10
15.	"Word Is Out"	James LeBon	3:35
16.	"If You Were with Me Now" (with Keith Washington)	Greg Masuak	3:11
17.	"Give Me Just a Little More Time"	Masuak	3:07
18.	"Finer Feelings" (Brothers in Rhythm 7" mix)	Hogan	3:53
19.	"What Kind of Fool (Heard All That Before)"	Masuak	3:41

Greatest Video Hits – Japanese Laserdisc bonus video
No.	Title	Director(s)	Length
20.	"Celebration"	Masuak	3:57

== Charts ==
=== Weekly charts ===
Chart performance for Greatest Hits in 1992
Chart (1992)	Peak position
Australian Albums (ARIA)	3
European Albums (Music & Media)	13
German Albums (Offizielle Top 100)	81
New Zealand Albums (RMNZ)	49
UK Albums (OCC)	1

=== Year-end charts ===
1992 year-end chart performance for Greatest Hits
Chart (1992)	Position
Australian Albums (ARIA)	51
UK Albums (OCC)	83

== Certifications and sales ==
Certifications and sales for Greatest Hits
Region	Certification	Certified units/sales
Australia (ARIA)	Platinum	70,000^{^}
United Kingdom (BPI)	Platinum	300,000^{^}
^{^} Shipments figures based on certification alone.

== Release history ==
Release dates and formats for Greatest Hits
Region	Date	Format(s)	Label(s)
United Kingdom	24 August 1992	CD; cassette; LP	PWL
