= List of Kylie Minogue live performances =

Kylie Minogue live performances
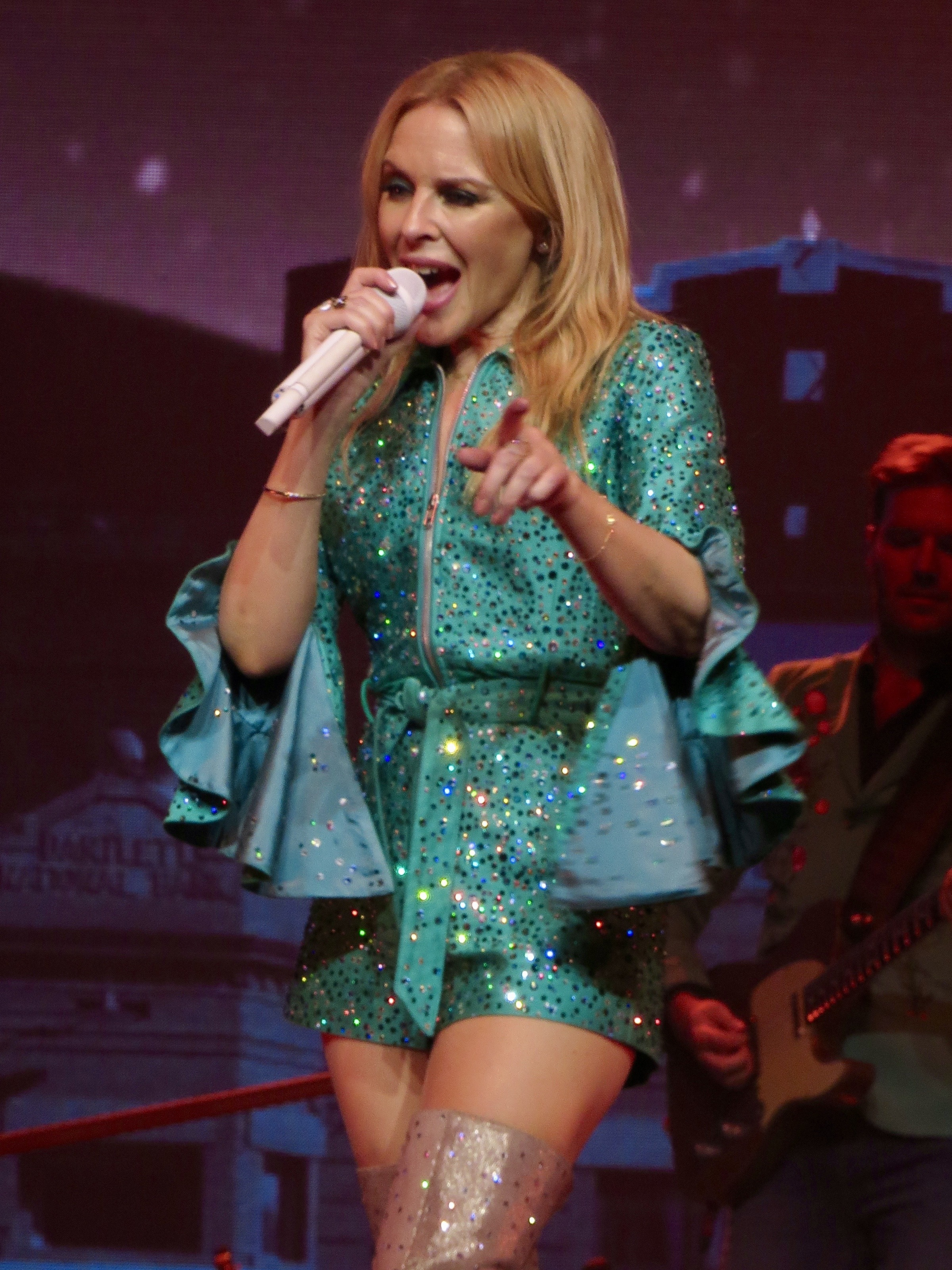
- Minogue performing in Scotland at the SSE Hydro during the Golden Tour
- Concert tours: 19
- Residencies: 1
- One-off concerts: 2

Kylie Minogue, an Australian singer-actress has headlined nineteen concert tours and one concert residency to support her albums. She has additionally performed at festivals, awards shows, benefit concerts and sporting events, as well as on television and radio.

Minogue's first official live performance was in 1988 at Canton, a nightclub in Hong Kong. The following year, she embarked on her first tour, which included performing in front of 38,000 fans at the Tokyo Dome in Japan.

Minogue's stage shows include elaborate costumes and sets that were inspired by Broadway musicals, science fiction films and electronic music groups, such as Kraftwerk. In 2003, she was named "Live Performer of the Year" at the Australian Mo Awards.

== Concert tours ==
List of concert tours of Kylie Minogue, with the duration, associated albums, continents visited and number of shows
Title	Start date	End date	Associated album(s)	Continent(s)	Shows
Disco in Dream	2 October 1989	27 October 1989	Kylie; Enjoy Yourself	Asia and Europe	14
Enjoy Yourself Tour	3 February 1990	26 May 1990	Enjoy Yourself	Asia, Europe and Oceania	24
Rhythm of Love Tour	10 February 1991	10 March 1991	Rhythm of Love	Asia and Oceania	19
Let's Get to It Tour	25 October 1991	8 November 1991	Let's Get to It	Europe	12
Intimate and Live	2 June 1998	31 July 1998	Impossible Princess	Europe and Oceania	22
On a Night Like This	3 March 2001	15 May 2001	Light Years	Europe and Oceania	46
KylieFever2002	26 April 2002	16 August 2002	Fever	Europe and Oceania	49
Showgirl: The Greatest Hits Tour	19 March 2005	7 May 2005	Ultimate Kylie	Europe	37
Showgirl: Homecoming Tour	11 November 2006	23 January 2007	Ultimate Kylie	Europe and Oceania	34
KylieX2008	6 May 2008	22 December 2008	X	Asia, Europe, Oceania and South America	74
For You, for Me	30 September 2009	13 October 2009	—N/a	North America	9
Aphrodite: Les Folies Tour	19 February 2011	14 July 2011	Aphrodite	Africa, Asia, Europe, North America and Oceania	77
Anti Tour	18 March 2012	3 April 2012	—N/a	Europe and Oceania	7
Kiss Me Once Tour	24 September 2014	28 March 2015	Kiss Me Once	Asia, Europe and Oceania	35
Summer 2015	12 June 2015	18 July 2015	—N/a	Europe	6
A Kylie Christmas	11 December 2015	10 December 2016	Kylie Christmas	Europe	3
Kylie Presents Golden	13 March 2018	25 June 2018	Golden	Europe and North America	6
Golden Tour	18 September 2018	17 March 2019	Golden	Europe and Oceania	33
Summer 2019	20 June 2019	7 March 2020	Step Back in Time: The Definitive Collection	Asia, Europe and South America	15
Tension Tour	15 February 2025	26 August 2025	Tension; Tension II	Asia, Europe, North America, Oceania and South America	66

== Concert residencies ==
List of concert residencies of Kylie Minogue, with the duration, associated album(s), location and number of shows.
Title	Start date	End date	Location	Associated album(s)	Shows
More Than Just a Residency	3 November 2023	4 May 2024	Nevada, United States	Tension	20

== One-off performances ==
=== Headlining ===
List of one-off performances of Kylie Minogue, with the date, location and associated album(s)
Title	Date	Location	Associated album(s)
Money Can't Buy	15 November 2003	London, England	Body Language
Infinite Disco	7 November 2020 (Note: Original streaming date)	London, England	Disco
Kylie – O² Empire Shepherd's Bush	27 September 2023	London, England	Tension

=== Others ===
List of one-off performances of Kylie Minogue, with the date and location
Title	Date	Location
Sydney Gay and Lesbian Mardi Gras	1994	Sydney, Australia
Sydney Gay and Lesbian Mardi Gras	1998	Sydney, Australia
MTV x Venice Film Festival	7 September 2000	Venice, Italy
KylieFever2002 end of European tour party hosted by Dolce & Gabbana	18 June 2002	Milan, Italy
Exa FM Concert	23 October 2010	Mexico City, Mexico
Macy's Thanksgiving Day Parade	25 November 2010	New York, United States
Christmas at Rockefeller Center	30 November 2010	New York, United States
Sydney Gay and Lesbian Mardi Gras	2012	Sydney, Australia
Stefano Gabbana's 50th birthday party	14 November 2012	Milan, Italy
Dolce & Gabbana Alta Moda party	12 July 2015	Santa Margherita Ligure, Italy
Hotel Cala di Volpe Gala Night	13 August 2016	Porto Cervo, Italy
The Queen's Birthday Party	21 April 2018	London, England
Philip Spanton's 60th birthday party	18 May 2019	Venice, Italy
I Love Beirut	20 September 2020	—N/a
Studio 2054	27 November 2020	London, England
What's Your Pleasure Tour	28 May 2022	London, England
Sydney WorldPride	24 February 2023	Sydney, Australia
London Fashion Week opening party	15 September 2023	London, England
Horse Meat Disco	24 June 2023	New York, United States
Radio 2 in the Park	17 September 2023	Leicester, England
The Celebration Tour	7 March 2024	Los Angeles, United States
Macy's Thanksgiving Day Parade	28 November 2024	New York, United States
Lali Tour 2025/26	6–7 June 2026	Buenos Aires, Argentina
2026 AFL Grand Final	2026	Melbourne, Australia

== Festivals ==
List of festival performances of Kylie Minogue, with the date and location
Title	Date	Location
Live It Began	4 June 2009	Poland
BST Hyde Park	21 June 2015 (Note: The 21 June 2015 concert in London, England at Hyde Park is a part of Minogue's Summer 2015 tour.)	London, England
BBC Radio 2 Live in Hyde Park	10 September 2018	London, England
Capital's Summertime Ball 2023	11 June 2023	London, England
Outloud Music Festival	2 June 2024	California, United States
BST Hyde Park	13 July 2024	London, England
Sziget Festival	7 August 2024	Budapest, Hungary

== Award shows ==
List of award shows performances of Kylie Minogue, with the date and location
Event	Date	Location
Smash Hits Poll Winners Party	29 October 1989	London, England
1991 World Music Awards	15 May 1991	Monte Carlo, Monaco
Smash Hits Poll Winners Party	6 December 1992	London, England
Smash Hits Poll Winners Party	3 December 1995	London, England
TMF Awards 2000	28 October 2000	Ghent, Belgium
2000 MTV Europe Music Awards	16 November 2000	Stockholm, Sweden
Smash Hits Poll Winners Party	10 December 2000	London, England
2001 MTV Europe Music Awards	8 November 2001	Frankfurt, Germany
Top of the Pops Awards 2001	30 November 2001	Manchester, England
Smash Hits Poll Winners Party	9 December 2001	United Kingdom
Radio DeeJay Dance Award	11 December 2001	Milan, Italy
Brit Awards 2002	20 February 2002	London, England
2002 World Music Awards	6 March 2002	Monte Carlo, Monaco
Top of the Pops Awards 2002	29 November 2002	Manchester, England
Brit Awards 2003	20 February 2003	London, England
2003 MTV Europe Music Awards	6 November 2003	Edinburgh, Scotland
NRJ Music Awards	24 January 2004	Cannes, France
2004 Echo Awards	6 March 2004	Berlin, Germany
TMF Awards 2004	17 April 2004	Rotterdam, Netherlands
Smash Hits T4 Poll Winners Party	21 November 2004	London, England
2008 Echo Awards	15 February 2008	Berlin, Germany
Brit Awards 2008	20 February 2008	London, England
Brit Awards 2009	18 February 2009	London, England
Wind Music Awards	29 May 2010	Verona, Italy
Miss Italia	12 September 2010	Salsomaggiore Terme, Italy
2014 Echo Awards	27 March 2014	Berlin, Germany
Logie Awards of 2014	27 April 2014	Melbourne, Australia
2018 Echo Awards	12 April 2018	Berlin, Germany
49th People's Choice Awards	18 February 2024	California, United States
Brit Awards 2024	2 March 2024	London, England

== Television shows and specials ==
List of television shows and specials performances of Kylie Minogue, with the date and location
Television show	Original air date	Country
Top of the Pops	3 August 1989	United Kingdom
Top of the Pops	20 August 1992	United Kingdom
Top of the Pops	26 November 1992	United Kingdom
Top of the Pops	25 August 1994	United Kingdom
Top of the Pops	8 September 1994	United Kingdom
Steve Wrights People Show	5 November 1994	United Kingdom
Top of the Pops	19 September 1997	United Kingdom
Top of the Pops	5 December 1997	United Kingdom
Top of the Pops	20 March 1998	United Kingdom
TFI Friday	8 December 2000	United Kingdom
An Audience with Ricky Martin	10 February 2001	United Kingdom
Festivalbar	8 September 2001	Italy
An Audience with Kylie Minogue	6 October 2001	United Kingdom
Quelli che... il calcio	28 October 2001	Italy
Premios Amigo	26 November 2001	Spain
Torno sabato	1 December 2001	Italy
Top of the Pops	3 January 2002	United Kingdom
Sanremo Music Festival	5 March 2002	Italy
Live with Regis and Kelly	16 July 2002	United States
Total Request Live	17 July 2002	United States
Last Call with Carson Daly	25 July 2002	United States
Top of the Pops	22 November 2002	United Kingdom
Top of the Pops Germany	30 November 2002	Germany
Top of the Pops Saturday	17 October 2003	United Kingdom
Torno sabato	22 November 2003	Italy
Quelli che... il calcio	30 November 2003	Italy
Top of the Pops	20 February 2004	United Kingdom
Parkinson	28 February 2004	United Kingdom
Top of the Pops Saturday	6 March 2004	United Kingdom
Top of the Pops	25 June 2004	United Kingdom
Top of the Pops	16 July 2004	United Kingdom
Top of the Pops	12 November 2004	United Kingdom
Top of the Pops	20 November 2004	United Kingdom
Quelli che... il calcio	5 December 2004	Italy
Top of the Pops Christmas	25 December 2004	United Kingdom
The Kylie Show	10 November 2007	United Kingdom
Che tempo che fa	10 November 2007	Italy
The X Factor	15 December 2007	United Kingdom
Dancing with the Stars	1 April 2008	United States
The Late Late Show with Craig Ferguson	2 April 2008	United States
The Ellen DeGeneres Show	7 April 2008	United States
Alan Carr: Chatty Man	18 July 2010	United Kingdom
Dancing with the Stars	25 July 2010	Australia
America's Got Talent	25 August 2010	United States
Décadas	24 October 2010	Mexico
Dancing with the Stars	26 October 2010	United States
The Tonight Show with Jay Leno	27 October 2010	United States
The X Factor	7 November 2010	United Kingdom
Jools' 18th Annual Hootenanny	31 December 2010	United Kingdom
X-Factor	22 October 2011	Ukraine
The X Factor	21 November 2011	Australia
The X Factor	22 November 2011	Australia
Michael McIntyre's Christmas Show 2011	December 2011	United Kingdom
The Voice UK	27 May 2012	United Kingdom
X Factor	6 December 2012	Italy
The X Factor	10 December 2012	United Kingdom
Alan Carr: Chatty Man	21 December 2012	United Kingdom
Le Grand Journal	March 2014	France
Sport Relief	21 March 2014	United Kingdom
The Voice UK	29 March 2014	United Kingdom
The Graham Norton Show	4 April 2014	United Kingdom
Amici di Maria De Filippi	5 April 2014	Italy
The Voice of Italy	7 May 2014	Italy
The Voice: la plus belle voix	10 May 2014	France
Alan Carr: Chatty Man	16 May 2014	United Kingdom
The Voice	30 June 2014	Australia
Stasera casa Mika	6 December 2016	Italy
The Graham Norton Show	6 April 2018	United Kingdom
Good Morning America	27 April 2018	United States
The Late Late Show with James Corden	30 April 2018	United States
The X Factor	28 October 2018	United Kingdom
The Jonathan Ross Show	10 November 2018	United Kingdom
Michael McIntyre's Big Show	24 November 2018	United Kingdom
Kylie's Secret Night	25 December 2019	United Kingdom
The Tonight Show Starring Jimmy Fallon	17 September 2020	United States
Good Morning America	6 November 2020	United States
The Late Show with Stephen Colbert	11 November 2020	United States
The Jonathan Ross Show	5 December 2020	United Kingdom
NBC New Year's Eve specials	31 December 2020	United States
New Year's Eve Live	31 December 2020	United States
The One Show	8 October 2021	United Kingdom
The Jonathan Ross Show	13 November 2021	United Kingdom
The New Years & Years Eve Party	31 December 2021	United Kingdom
American Idol	21 May 2023	United States
An Audience with Kylie	10 December 2023	United Kingdom

== Radio shows ==
List of radio shows performances of Kylie Minogue, with the date and location
Radio show	Original air date	Country
The Zoe Ball's Breakfast Show	6 November 2020	United Kingdom
Kylie KyRyokee Special	26 October 2024	United Kingdom

== Sporting events ==
List of sporting event performances of Kylie Minogue, with the date and location
Event	Date	Location
2000 Summer Olympics closing ceremony	1 October 2000	Sydney, Australia
2000 Summer Paralympics opening ceremonies	18 October 2000	Sydney, Australia
2014 Commonwealth Games closing ceremonies	3 August 2014	Glasgow, Scotland
2024 Singapore Grand Prix	22 September 2024	Marina Bay, Singapore
