= Let's Get to It Tour =

1991 concert tour by Kylie Minogue

- Continental tour by Kylie Minogue
- Tour programme for the UK leg
- Location: Europe
- Associated album: Let's Get to It
- Start date: 25 October 1991
- End date: 8 November 1991
- Legs: 1
- No. of shows: 12

Kylie Minogue concert chronology
- Rhythm of Love Tour (1991); Let's Get to It Tour (1991); Intimate and Live (1998)

The Let's Get to It Tour was the fourth concert tour by Australian pop singer Kylie Minogue. As stated by Minogue herself in 1991, the tour was technically a continuation of the previous Rhythm of Love Tour which had already visited Australia and Asia. In addition to revising the setlist, she assembled a new band to work with her existing musical director and choreographer. Backed by her five dancers, Minogue mounted the tour in support of her fourth studio album Let's Get to It (1991).

The show comprised an all-new couture wardrobe created by John Galliano and several new additions to the set list from the new album, many of which were written by Minogue herself. She wore a plastic raincoat, which was designed by Galliano.

By her choosing of outfits on the tour, the title "SexKylie" was given by the media in this period.

== Background and development ==
The tour is an updated version of her last tour promoting for Rhythm of Love. A whole new stage wardrobe was conducted by British fashion designer John Galliano in Minogue's first collaboration with a major fashion designer.

In August 1991, Minogue said she was churning ideas around about different costumes, different designers and so on. Speaking on her inspiration for the tour's fashion, she said "Well, I don't know if this makes any sense but I'm looking into the future for inspiration. It probably sounds a bit odd but I know what I mean by it. Every one – me included – usually looks back into the past to get inspired for a new look but I'm trying to imagine what life's going to be like in the year 2000."

== Reception ==
After the first show of the tour, a tabloid accused Minogue of copying Madonna's look from her Blond Ambition World Tour.

Writing for Chronicle Live in 2014, Gordon Barr said the performance she gave on the tour was a "polished" one he has seldom seen at the many other gigs he has been to.

Minogue also caused lots criticisms for her choice of costume on the tour. When being asked about the subject on Tonight Live with Steve Vizard, Minogue stated:

"I would like to think that people in England—and also around the world—don't take what they say as being gospel. I actually had a lot of really good press, and so, as far as I can tell it was about time to give me a hard time, but, for me, the only way I can judge the shows was from the audiences' reactions and they were just great. And of course the outfits were a bit, maybe, a little bit too much, but that wasn't a mistake, that was meant to cause a bit of a stir."

In 2013, VH1 listed her in the fishnet costume as one of her ten most "butt-iful" moments. Irish Examiner called the outfit "risque", but stated: "There IS such a thing as too much fishnet, and this is definitely overstepping the mark."

== Set list ==
This set list was taken from Minogue's official website.

1. "Step Back in Time"
2. "Wouldn't Change a Thing"
3. "Got to Be Certain"
4. "Always Find the Time"
5. "Enjoy Yourself"
6. "Tears on My Pillow"
7. "Secrets"
8. "Let's Get to It"
9. "Word Is Out"
10. "Finer Feelings"
11. "I Should Be So Lucky"
12. "Love Train"
13. "If You Were with Me Now" (with James Uluave)
14. "Je ne sais pas pourquoi"
15. "Too Much of a Good Thing"
16. "Hand on Your Heart"
17. "What Do I Have to Do"

Encore

18. "I Guess I Like It Like That"
19. "The Loco-Motion"
20. "Shocked"
21. "Better the Devil You Know"

=== Notes ===
- During the London and Dublin performances, Jazzi P appeared to perform with Minogue on "Shocked".

== Tour dates ==
List of 1991 concerts, showing date, city, country and venue
Date (1991)	City	Country	Venue
25 October	Plymouth	United Kingdom	Plymouth Pavilions
26 October	Birmingham	United Kingdom	NEC Arena
27 October	Nottingham	United Kingdom	Nottingham Royal Concert Hall
29 October	London	United Kingdom	Wembley Arena
30 October	London	United Kingdom	Wembley Arena
31 October	Manchester	United Kingdom	Manchester Apollo
1 November	Whitley Bay	United Kingdom	Whitley Bay Ice Rink
3 November	Aberdeen	United Kingdom	AECC Arena
4 November	Edinburgh	United Kingdom	Edinburgh Playhouse
5 November	Edinburgh	United Kingdom	Edinburgh Playhouse
6 November	Sheffield	United Kingdom	Sheffield City Hall
8 November	Dublin	Ireland	Point Theatre

== Broadcasts and recordings ==
Live!
- Cover for the VHS release in United Kingdom and Japan

Video by Kylie Minogue
- Released: 9 April 1992
- Recorded: 8 November 1991
- Venue: Point Theatre (Dublin)
- Genre: Pop
- Length: 80 minutes
- Label: PMI; Mushroom
- Director: Ian Hamilton
- Producer: Kylie Minogue (exec.); Michael Baumohl

Kylie Minogue chronology
Let's Get to...the Videos (1991)	Live! (1992)	Greatest Video Hits (1992)

Live! (or Live in Dublin for the Australian release) is a video album by Australian singer Kylie Minogue. It was recorded during her performance in Dublin on 8 November 1991. It was released on 9 April 1992 by EMI internationally and Mushroom in Australia on VHS format only. In Japan Alfa Records also issued it on Laserdisc. Although they appear on the set list of the tour, "Hand on Your Heart", "Je Ne Sais Pas Pourquoi", "Enjoy Yourself", "Secrets" and "Tears on My Pillow" were cut from the VHS release of the tour. "Got to Be Certain", "Finer Feelings" and "I Guess I Like It Like That" were all edited for the video release. The editor was Gareth Maynard.

=== Track listing ===
All songs are written by Mike Stock, Matt Aitken and Pete Waterman, except where noted.

No.	Title	Writer(s)	Length
1.	"Intro"		2:28
2.	"Step Back in Time"		3:51
3.	"Wouldn't Change a Thing"		4:05
4.	"Behind the scenes footage 1" (Choreography rehearsal)		1:02
5.	"Got to Be Certain"		3:06
6.	"Always Find the Time"	Stock; Aitken; Waterman; Rick James	3:48
7.	"Behind the scenes footage 2" (Soundcheck)		2:53
8.	"Let's Get to It"	Stock; Waterman	3:55
9.	"Word Is Out"	Stock; Waterman	3:59
10.	"Behind the scenes footage 3" (Costume design – Interview with John Galliano)		1:04
11.	"Finer Feelings"	Stock; Waterman	3:39
12.	"I Should Be So Lucky"		3:52
13.	"Love Train" (the O'Jays cover)	Kenneth Gamble; Leon Huff	5:12
14.	"Behind the scenes footage 4" (Rehearsal to "If You Were With Me Now")		1:49
15.	"If You Were With Me Now" (duet with James Uluave)	Minogue; Stock; Waterman; Keith Washington	3:20
16.	"Too Much of a Good Thing"	Minogue; Stock; Waterman	4:06
17.	"Behind the scenes footage 5"		2:53
18.	"What Do I Have to Do?"		4:09
19.	"I Guess I Like it Like That"	Minogue; Stock; Waterman; Phil Wilde; Jean-Paul de Coster	3:17
20.	"The Loco-Motion"	Gerry Goffin; Carole King	3:24
21.	"Behind the scenes footage 6" (Rehearsal to "Shocked")		2:07
22.	"Shocked" (with Jazzi P)	Stock; Aitken; Waterman; Pauline Bennett	5:56
23.	"Better the Devil You Know"		4:30
24.	"Credits" (Crew harmony to Amazing Grace)		2:17
Total length:			80:00

==== Notes ====
- The laserdisc version has two sides. Side 1 runs from "Opening" to "If You Were with Me Now", while side 2 runs from "Too Much of a Good Thing" to "Better the Devil You Know", including the credits.
- The behind the scenes footage were collectively recorded in London and Dublin.

=== Commercial performance ===
According to Music Week, Live! debuted at number 3 on Top 30 UK Music Videos chart and charted for 9 weeks from 2 May 1992 to 27 June 1992. In the same week, it debuted at number 12 on Top 15 Videos chart then peaked at number 5 in the week of May 16. (Note: indicated in the week after.) It spent 8 weeks charting before reappearing in the week of July 18 at number 14.

=== Charts ===
Chart performance for Live! (Note: formerly entitled Live and Outrageous 91.) in 1992
Chart (1992)	Peak position
UK Music Videos (Music Week Top 30)	3
UK Videos (Music Week Top 15)	5

== Personnel ==
Credits and personnel are taken from Minogue's official website.

Main

- Kylie Minogue – production, concept, wardrobe
- Terry Blamey – administrator
- Adrian Scott – music director
- Nick Pitts – tour manager
- Henry Crallam – production manager
- Clive Franks – sound manager
- Jonathon Smeeton – lighting director
- Venol John – choreographer
- Yvonne Savage – assistant
- John Galliano – wardrobe

Musicians

- Adrian Scott – keyboards
- John Creech – drums
- Jamie Jardine – guitar
- Craig Newman – bass
- Tania Smith – keyboards
- Jamie O'Neal – backing vocals
- Susie Ahern – backing vocals
- James Uluave – backing vocals

Dancers

- Venol John – dancer
- Richard Allen – dancer
- Cosima Dusting – dancer
- Simone Kay – dancer
- Mitchell Bartlett – dancer

== See also ==
- List of Kylie Minogue concert tours
