= Word Is Out (disambiguation) =

"Word Is Out", is a 1991 song by Kylie Minogue.

Word Is Out may also refer to:

- Word Is Out: Stories of Some of Our Lives, a 1977 documentary directed by Peter Adair, and the 1978 book which transcribed it
- "Word's Out", a 1989 episode of Shining Time Station
