= Anti Tour =

2012 concert tour by Kylie Minogue

- Tour by Kylie Minogue
- Location: Oceania; Europe
- Start date: 18 March 2012
- End date: 3 April 2012
- No. of shows: 7
- Attendance: 15,765
- Box office: $1,721,698

Kylie Minogue concert chronology
- Aphrodite: Les Folies Tour (2011); Anti Tour (2012); Kiss Me Once Tour (2014–15)

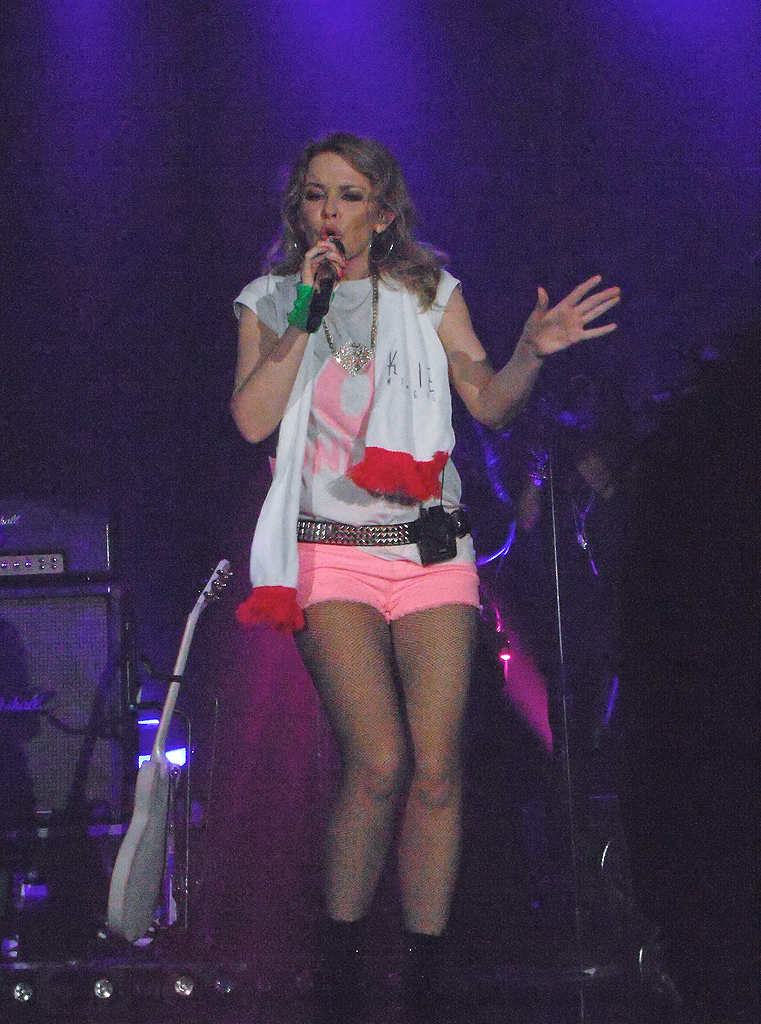
Minogue performing at Manchester Academy

The Anti Tour was the thirteenth concert tour by Australian recording artist Kylie Minogue, as part of the "K25" project. The tour began on 18 March 2012 in Melbourne, Australia at the Palace Theatre and concluded on 3 April 2012 in London, England at the Hammersmith Apollo, consisting of four shows in Australia and three shows in the United Kingdom.

In contrast to Minogue's previous tours, the singer only performed B-sides, demos and rare tracks, on a short strip of concerts in smaller venues, to a reduced crowd and intimate setting.

== Background ==
In April 2011, during the Aphrodite: Les Folies Tour, Minogue talked about the Anti Tour conception:

I've never done anything like that before, something like an anti-tour where there are no dancers, there are no lights. It's just music and doing songs that are much loved by super fans but will never, ever, ever be heard anywhere. [...] I think it would be really cool to be in a tiny, tiny venue, maybe do like a week's run somewhere and just strip everything back—just do songs that uber-fans would cry for.

— Kylie Minogue in an interview with Idolator

Because the first two shows in Australia sold out only minutes after the tickets went on sale, Minogue announced that she would perform second shows on both dates. On 25 March, Minogue announced that she would be performing two shows in the United Kingdom during April (including one at the Hammersmith Apollo, where she had previously performed her 2003 Money Can't Buy show). Both UK shows sold out within ten minutes but quickly found their way on resale sites at discounted rates. Due to huge demand, a second show in Manchester was announced.

== Critical response ==
The tour received universal acclaim from music critics. Emily Jupp from The Independent gave the concert a five star review stating that Minogue was "[She's] warm and sassy" and "Graceful [...] like a magical joy-sharing fairy, sprinkling euphoria across the crowd". About the staging of the show, Jupp said that "There's no choreography and just one slight costume change but she proves she doesn't need theatrics." concluding that "She didn't even need the glitter; she sparkled brightly all by herself." Michael Wilton from musicOMH gave the concert a favorable review, awarding it with four stars, stating that "Backed by a stripped-down, well-rehearsed four-piece band and three backing singers, Kylie had to rely solely on her command of the stage. Although Kylie will not go down in history as one of pop's great voices, her vocal control and delivery has improved dramatically, and for the most part, she exceeded possibly even her own expectations." Wilton said that "even though the show still had a structured sheen, Kylie was completely relaxed, joking with fans, giggling when she forgot the lines to a song, and dancing to the beat of her own drum on stage." He concluded his review by saying that "25 years later, she's still clearly enjoying herself, and more importantly, eternally grateful to her fans." Dianne Bourne of the Manchester Evening News notes that Minogue "has been the undoubted queen of the Manchester Arena over the past 10 years, performing more concerts to more fans than any other female artist", describing her concert as "undoubtedly something magical."

== Set list ==
This set list represents songs performed at all shows.

- "Magnetic Electric" (a bonus track on the Southern Asia tour edition of X)
- "Made in Heaven" (the B-side to "Je ne sais pas pourquoi")
- "Cherry Bomb" (a B-side to Wow and Latin American bonus track from X)
- "B.P.M." (the B-side to "I Believe in You")
- "Mighty Rivers" (bonus track from the iTunes Deluxe Edition of Aphrodite)
- "I'm Over Dreaming (Over You)" (from Enjoy Yourself)
- "Always Find the Time" (from Rhythm of Love)
- "You're the One" (an unreleased track from the Impossible Princess sessions)
- "Tightrope" (a B-side to "In Your Eyes" and Australian bonus track from Fever)
- "Paper Dolls" (a B-side to "Spinning Around")
- "Stars" (from X)
- "Drunk" (from Impossible Princess)
- "Say Hey" (from Impossible Princess)
- "Too Much" (from Aphrodite)
- "Bittersweet Goodbye" (from Light Years)
- "Disco Down" (from Light Years)
- "I Don't Need Anyone" (from Impossible Princess)
- "Got to Be Certain" (from Kylie)
- "Things Can Only Get Better" (from Rhythm of Love)

Encore

- "Tears on My Pillow" (from Enjoy Yourself)
- "Enjoy Yourself" (from Enjoy Yourself)

=== Notes ===
- "That's Why They Write Love Songs" (an unreleased track from the X sessions) was performed as the first song of the encore at all Australian shows. On 2 April the song was performed as the last song before the encore.
- Minogue did an a capella rendition of "Word Is Out" on the Sydney concert.
- "Do It Again" (a B-Side to Wow and Mexican bonus track from X) was performed as the first song of the encore at all shows in England.
- "It's No Secret" (from Kylie) was performed impromptu at all shows in England.
- "One Boy Girl" (from Rhythm of Love) was performed during the encore at the 2 and 3 April shows.
- "Give Me Just a Little More Time" (from Let's Get to It) was performed impromptu on 3 April.
- "What Kind of Fool (Heard All That Before)" had a snippet performed during a show in Melbourne and one in Manchester.

== Shows ==
List of concerts, showing date, city, country, venue, tickets sold, number of available tickets and amount of gross revenue
Date (2012)	City	Country	Venue	Attendance	Revenue
18 March (Note: Consisted of matinee and evening shows.)	Melbourne	Australia	Palace Theatre	3,710 / 3,710	$395,680
20 March	Sydney	Australia	Big Top at Luna Park	3,000 / 3,000	$326,900
1 April	Manchester	England	Manchester Academy	4,000 / 4,000	$411,876
2 April	Manchester	England	Manchester Academy	4,000 / 4,000	$411,876
3 April	London	England	Hammersmith Apollo	5,055 / 5,055	$588,242
Total				15,765 / 15,765 (100%)	$1,721,698
