= Showgirl: Homecoming Tour =

2006–2007 concert tour by Kylie Minogue

- Tour by Kylie Minogue
- Promotional poster for the tour
- Location: Oceania; Europe
- Associated album: Ultimate Kylie
- Start date: 11 November 2006
- End date: 23 January 2007
- Legs: 2
- No. of shows: 34
- Box office: US$40.34 million ($62.64 million in 2025 dollars)

Kylie Minogue concert chronology
- Showgirl: The Greatest Hits Tour (2005); Showgirl: Homecoming Tour (2006–07); KylieX2008 (2008)

Showgirl: Homecoming Tour was the ninth concert tour by Australian singer Kylie Minogue, in support of her second major greatest hits compilation, Ultimate Kylie (2004). The tour began on 11 November 2006 in Sydney, Australia at the Sydney Entertainment Centre and concluded on 23 January 2007 in London, England at Wembley Arena, consisting of 20 shows in Australia and 14 shows in England.

Minogue was originally scheduled to perform in Australia and Asia during Showgirl: The Greatest Hits Tour in 2005, but the dates were postponed due to her breast cancer diagnosis. The tour resumed the following year, with a revised set list and new costumes. To accommodate Minogue's medical condition and conserve her strength, both alterations to the choreography and longer breaks between show sections were introduced.

== Background ==
For the Homecoming Tour, the show was re-vamped and re-structured into a new production. The tour initially started as an Australian-only tour, to compensate those shows cancelled from the previous tour; however, fourteen shows were scheduled in the United Kingdom due to popular demand, with the Asian shows from Showgirl being indefinitely cancelled.

== Concert synopsis ==
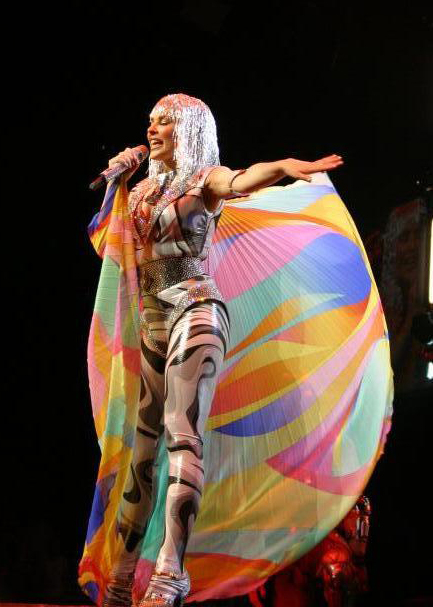
Minogue performing "Can't Get You Out of My Head"

The show was split into seven acts: Homecoming, Everything Taboo, Samsara, Athletica, Dreams, Pop Paradiso, Dance of the Cybermen, with the addition of an encore and an interval. The show opens with an instrumental introduction, before Minogue rises out of the stage on a platform dressed in a pink showgirl outfit. She opens the show with "Better the Devil You Know", which is quickly followed by a performance of "In Your Eyes". After addressing the audience, Minogue performed "White Diamond", and closed the section with "On a Night Like This", which begins as a ballad.

The second section begins with a dance interlude, using excerpts of "Do You Dare?", before Minogue rises out of the centre of the stage to perform a medley of "Shocked" "What Do I Have to Do" and "Spinning Around". Several songs were sampled and interpolated during the medley, including:"It's No Secret", "Keep on Pumpin' It", "Give Me Just a Little More Time", "What Kind of Fool (Heard All That Before)", "I'm Over Dreaming (Over You)", "Finally", "Step Back in Time" and "Such a Good Feeling".

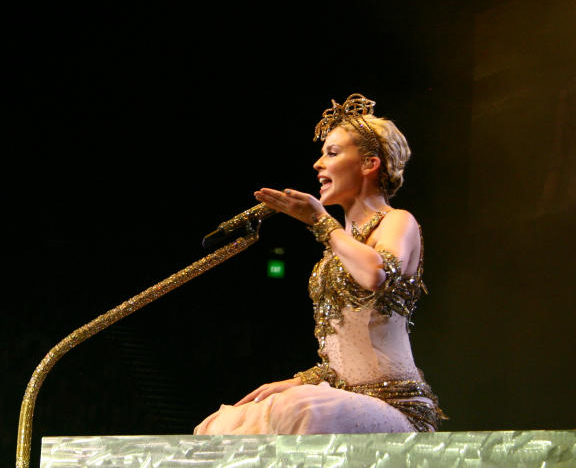
Minogue performing "Cowboy Style"

The third section begins with a dance interlude, followed by a performance of "Confide in Me", where the dancers treat Minogue as if she were a puppet. This is followed by performances of "Cowboy Style" and "Finer Feelings", the latter of which is sung by the backing vocalists as Minogue dances. Samsara ends with a performance of "Too Far".

The fourth act begins with a dance interlude of the Sandstorm Dub of "Butterfly", featuring acrobat Terry Kvasnik. Minogue then performed "Red Blooded Woman", featuring an excerpt of "Where the Wild Roses Grow". This was followed with performances of "Slow" and "Kids" before a short interval.

The fifth section begins with a cover of "Somewhere Over the Rainbow" where Minogue rises from behind the stage on a sequined moon. This is then followed by a torch version of "Come into My World" and a shortened version "Chocolate". The stage then morphs at the end of the catwalk to form a "cake", from which she sings "I Believe in You". The act closes with a performance of "Dreams".

Pop Paradiso opens with an interlude of Minogue's song "Burning Up", mashed up with Madonna's "Vogue". She then goes on to perform a jazz version of "The Locomotion" which is followed by a performance of "I Should Be So Lucky", featuring an excerpt of "The Only Way Is Up". Minogue closed the section with a remix of "Hand on Your Heart".

The penultimate section opens with a remix of "Can't Get You Out of My Head", leading into the countdown of "Light Years"; this version of the song is mashed up with song "Turn It into Love". For the encore, Minogue performed a sing-a-long version of "Especially for You", before closing the show with a performance of "Love at First Sight", as a video montage of her career shown on the video screens behind her.

== Critical reception ==
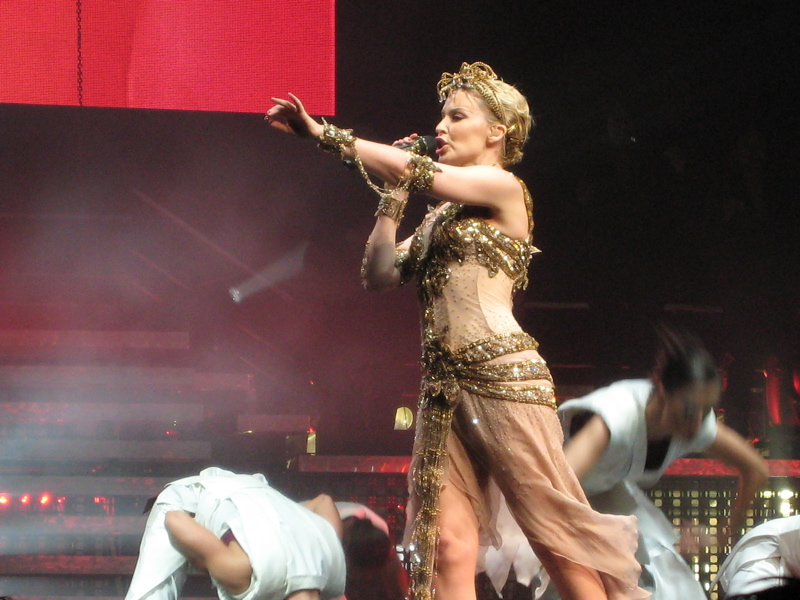
Minogue performing "Too Far"

Showgirl: Homecoming Tour received critical acclaim. The Age's Patrick Donovan wrote that Minogue "looked fit and healthy and was in good voice". He also wrote that she was "at her best prowling the stage in a catsuit, playing up to the crowd". Kathy McCabe of The Daily Telegraph newspaper also wrote a positive review, stating it was Minogue's imagination and professionalism which established the "Showgirl Homecoming" concept as a new benchmark for the pop concert. "Simply, Minogue is the best act in town when it comes to pop", she said, complementing that she had exceeded the public's expectations with "dazzling couture costumes, state-of-the-art lighting and staging, and special effects which almost stunned the delirious crowd into silence". Christine Sams in a review for The Sydney Morning Herald described the show as an "extravaganza" and wrote that it was "nothing less than a triumph". Similarly, a writer of The Observer, Kitty Empire said her "bold, brash comeback show is a triumph", and as a whole, "the stagecraft, the lasers, the costumes, the feathers: they all conspire to make Showgirl mesmerising", making it "easy to ignore the songs you don't care for".

CBBC Newsround described the tour as the "perfect comeback" due to its "range of songs, excellent dancers, stage lighting and Kylie's love of performing". Ludovic Hunter-Tilney from the Financial Times noted how "the outfits were as camp as the Rio carnival, the songs were irrepressibly bubbly and Kylie was as much the stage trouper as ever, beaming those huge white teeth at us and making no mention of recent ill-health", and felt her voice had improved since her previous tour. A reviewer from the Manchester Evening News newspaper commented that "Showgirl remains a spectacle filled with genuine moments - not just because Kylie has been ill", attributing it to the "self deprecating and fun as well as emotional" nature of the concert. For Priya Elan of NME magazine, the concert was "nothing less than a ‘Show!’", also commenting how the audience was "just happy to see their heroine healthy again", and "They are overjoyed to see her of course, but a long time ago Kylie Minogue realised that being a national treasure involved being entertaining for entertainment’s sake, and tonight, she is gloriously that".

== Broadcasts and recordings ==
Minogue's performance in Melbourne, Australia on 11 December 2006 was filmed for television and commercial release. The concert premiered on 13 January 2007 in the United Kingdom on Channel 4. On 4 March 2007, the Australian Broadcasting Corporation broadcast the performance without commercial interruptions in Australia. The concert was released to DVD on 10 December 2007 as a double disc set with Minogue's documentary film White Diamond: A Personal Portrait of Kylie Minogue. Additionally, the second concert in Sydney on 12 November 2006 was recorded and released as a live album titled Showgirl: Homecoming Live in January 2007. It featured a guest appearance by U2 lead singer Bono on the song "Kids". The album reached number seven on the UK Albums Chart and was certified silver by the British Phonographic Industry (BPI).

A documentary titled White Diamond: A Personal Portrait of Kylie Minogue was filmed containing behind-the-scenes footage of Minogue's life during the tour. Directed by her stylist and close friend William Baker, it premiered on 16 October 2007 in Australia and three days later in the United Kingdom, before being released commercially on 10 December 2007. The project received mixed reviews from critics.

== Set list ==
Act 1: Homecoming

1. "Showgirl Theme" (Instrumental Introduction)
2. "Better the Devil You Know"
3. "In Your Eyes"
4. "White Diamond"
5. "On a Night Like This"

Act 2: Everything Taboo

6. "Shocked" (contains excerpts from "Do You Dare?", "It's No Secret", "Give Me Just A Little More Time", "Keep on Pumpin' It" and "What Kind of Fool (Heard All That Before)")
7. "What Do I Have to Do?" (contains excerpt from "I'm Over Dreaming (Over You)")
8. "Spinning Around" (contains excerpts from "Step Back in Time" along with elements of "Finally" and "Such a Good Feeling")

Act 3: Samsara

9. "Temple Prequel" (Interlude)
10. "Confide in Me"
11. "Cowboy Style"
12. "Finer Feelings" (Performed by backing vocalists)
13. "Too Far"

Act 4: Athletica

14. "Butterfly" (Sandstorm Dub) (Dance Interlude)
15. "Red Blooded Woman" (contains excerpts from "Where the Wild Roses Grow")
16. "Slow"
17. "Kids"

Act 5: Dreams

18. "Rainbow Prequel" (Interlude)
19. "Over the Rainbow"
20. "Come into My World"
21. "Chocolate"
22. "I Believe in You"
23. "Dreams" (contains excerpts from "When You Wish upon a Star")

Act 6: Pop Paradiso

24. "Burning Up" / "Vogue"
25. "The Locomotion"
26. "I Should Be So Lucky" (contains excerpts from "The Only Way Is Up")
27. "Hand on Your Heart"

Act 7: Dance of the Cybermen

28. "Space Prequel" (Interlude)
29. "Can't Get You Out of My Head" (contains excerpts from "Rise of the Cybermen" along with elements of the "Doctor Who Theme")
30. "Light Years" / "Turn It into Love" (contains elements of the TARDIS dematerializing)

Encore

31. "Especially for You" (Intro contains an excerpt of "Love's in Need of Love Today")
32. "Love at First Sight"
Notes
- On 31 December 2006, Kylie performed "Celebration" before "Love at First Sight".
- On 13 January 2007, Kylie had to end the show early due to illness. An acappella version of "Got to Be Certain" along with "Kids" were performed as an encore. The following two shows were postponed and all were rescheduled.

== Tour dates ==
List of 2006 concerts
| Date (2006) | City | Country | Venue | Attendance | Revenue |
|---|---|---|---|---|---|
| 11 November | Sydney | Australia | Sydney Entertainment Centre | 34,774 / 34,774 | $2,963,147 |
| 12 November | Sydney | Australia | Sydney Entertainment Centre | 34,774 / 34,774 | $2,963,147 |
| 14 November | Sydney | Australia | Sydney Entertainment Centre | 34,774 / 34,774 | $2,963,147 |
| 17 November | Brisbane | Australia | Brisbane Entertainment Centre | 35,574 / 37,884 | $3,354,548 |
| 18 November | Brisbane | Australia | Brisbane Entertainment Centre | 35,574 / 37,884 | $3,354,548 |
| 20 November | Brisbane | Australia | Brisbane Entertainment Centre | 35,574 / 37,884 | $3,354,548 |
| 23 November | Sydney | Australia | Acer Arena | 51,852 / 51,852 | $4,963,147 |
| 24 November | Sydney | Australia | Acer Arena | 51,852 / 51,852 | $4,963,147 |
| 26 November | Sydney | Australia | Acer Arena | 51,852 / 51,852 | $4,963,147 |
| 30 November | Adelaide | Australia | Adelaide Entertainment Centre | 21,583 / 22,411 | $2,369,124 |
| 1 December | Adelaide | Australia | Adelaide Entertainment Centre | 21,583 / 22,411 | $2,369,124 |
| 4 December | Perth | Australia | Burswood Dome | 36,774 / 38,774 | $3,554,147 |
| 5 December | Perth | Australia | Burswood Dome | 36,774 / 38,774 | $3,554,147 |
| 7 December | Perth | Australia | Burswood Dome | 36,774 / 38,774 | $3,554,147 |
| 10 December | Melbourne | Australia | Rod Laver Arena | 76,526 / 76,526 | $7,578,217 |
| 11 December | Melbourne | Australia | Rod Laver Arena | 76,526 / 76,526 | $7,578,217 |
| 13 December | Melbourne | Australia | Rod Laver Arena | 76,526 / 76,526 | $7,578,217 |
| 14 December | Melbourne | Australia | Rod Laver Arena | 76,526 / 76,526 | $7,578,217 |
| 16 December | Melbourne | Australia | Rod Laver Arena | 76,526 / 76,526 | $7,578,217 |
| 17 December | Melbourne | Australia | Rod Laver Arena | 76,526 / 76,526 | $7,578,217 |
| 31 December | London | England | Wembley Arena | 78,526 / 78,526 (Note: Combined totals for all London shows.) | $7,578,217 |

List of 2007 concerts
| Date (2007) | City | Country | Venue | Attendance | Revenue |
|---|---|---|---|---|---|
| 2 January | London | England | Wembley Arena | — | — |
| 3 January | London | England | Wembley Arena | — | — |
| 5 January | London | England | Wembley Arena | — | — |
| 6 January | London | England | Wembley Arena | — | — |
| 8 January | London | England | Wembley Arena | — | — |
| 9 January | London | England | Wembley Arena | — | — |
| 12 January | Manchester | England | MEN Arena | 100,072 / 100,072 | $7,976,089 |
| 13 January (Note: An hour into the performance, Minogue cancelled the show due to respiratory tract infection. Attendees were able to use their tickets to attend a rescheduled date on 23 January.) | Manchester | England | MEN Arena | 100,072 / 100,072 | $7,976,089 |
| 18 January | Manchester | England | MEN Arena | 100,072 / 100,072 | $7,976,089 |
| 19 January | Manchester | England | MEN Arena | 100,072 / 100,072 | $7,976,089 |
| 21 January (Note: Rescheduled from 15 and 16 January due to respiratory tract infection.) | Manchester | England | MEN Arena | 100,072 / 100,072 | $7,976,089 |
| 22 January | Manchester | England | MEN Arena | 100,072 / 100,072 | $7,976,089 |
| 23 January | Manchester | England | MEN Arena | 100,072 / 100,072 | $7,976,089 |
| Total | | | | 435,681 / 440,819 (99%) | $40,336,636 |

== Personnel ==
- Kylie Minogue - executive producer
- Terry Blamey - executive producer
- William Baker - creative director and designer
- Steve Anderson - musician production
- Kevin Hopgood - production manager
- Alan MacDonald - production design
- John Galliano - costume design
- Karl Lagerfeld - costume design
- Dolce & Gabbana - costume design, shoes
- Addae Gaskin - costume design
- Gareth Pugh - costume design
- Matthew Williamson for Emilio Pucci - costume design
- Bvlgari - jewelry
- Manolo Blahnik - shoes
- Stephen Jones - millinery
- Rafael Bonachela - choreographer
- Akram Khan - choreographer
- Michael Rooney - choreographer
- Sean Fitzpatrick - tour manager
- Andrew Small - drums
- Steve Turner - keyboards
- Chris Brown - bass
- Mark Jaimes - guitar
- Valerie Etienne - backing vocals
- Hazel Fernandez - backing vocals
- Janet Ramus - backing vocals
- Dance Captain: Annoulka Yanminchev
- Dancers: Jason Beitel - dancer
- Marco Da Silva - dancer
- Jamie Karitzis - dancer
- Alan Lambie - dancer
- Welly Locoh Donou - dancer
- Claire Meehan - dancer
- Jason Piper - dancer
- Nikoletta Rafaelisova - dancer
- Andile Sotiya - dancer
- Nikki Trow - dancer
- Rachel Yau - dancer
- Terry Kvasnik - acrobat
