= I Guess I Like It Like That =

1991 promotional single by Kylie Minogue

- 12" promotional vinyl cover

Promotional single by Kylie Minogue

from the album Let's Get to It
- A-side: "If You Were with Me Now"
- Released: October 1991
- Studio: PWL Studios (London, England)
- Genre: Techno-pop; dance; house
- Length: 6:00 (album version); 3:30 (edit)
- Label: Mushroom
- Songwriters: Mike Stock; Pete Waterman; Kylie Minogue; Phil Wilde; Jean-Paul de Coster
- Producers: Mike Stock; Pete Waterman

Audio video
- "I Guess I Like It Like That" on YouTube

"I Guess I Like It Like That" is a 1991 promotional single written by Australian singer-songwriter Kylie Minogue and British producers Mike Stock and Pete Waterman for Minogue's fourth album Let's Get to It. The song samples 2 Unlimited's "Get Ready for This" written by Phil Wilde, Jean-Paul de Coster and Ray Slijngaard. On the 2015 UK re-release of the Let's Get to It album, Wilde and de Coster were credited as co-authors of the song (Stock/Waterman/Minogue/DeCoster/Wilde). The song also samples Freestyle Orchestra's "Keep On Pumping It Up" and the Salt-N-Pepa song "I Like It Like That".

== Background ==
During this time, Minogue was fascinated by club music. Although her music was always played in commercial clubs, the pop element of her earlier works made the "cooler clubs" tend to "frown upon" her music. Minogue then created the alias "Angel K" for herself and released white label promotional vinyls of techno tracks including "Do You Dare" and "Closer"; both of the songs later appeared as B-sides on "Give Me Just a Little More Time and "Finer Feelings", respectively.

== Critical reception ==
Nathan Wood from Foxtel's MaxTV called the song "surprising" and claimed it "signaled Kylie's change from a pop princess to an artist with diverse, genre-pushing tastes, and paved the way for her extensive exploration into the world of dance music that would come later." Digital Spy's Nick Levine stated he "has even fallen for the 2 Unlimited sample." However, Chris True from AllMusic criticised the stadium keyboard part that lays the foundation of the song, calling it one of album's "noticeable missteps". Nick Griffiths from Select gave a mixed review of the track, calling the song "impressive but blatant clubdom".

== Live performances ==
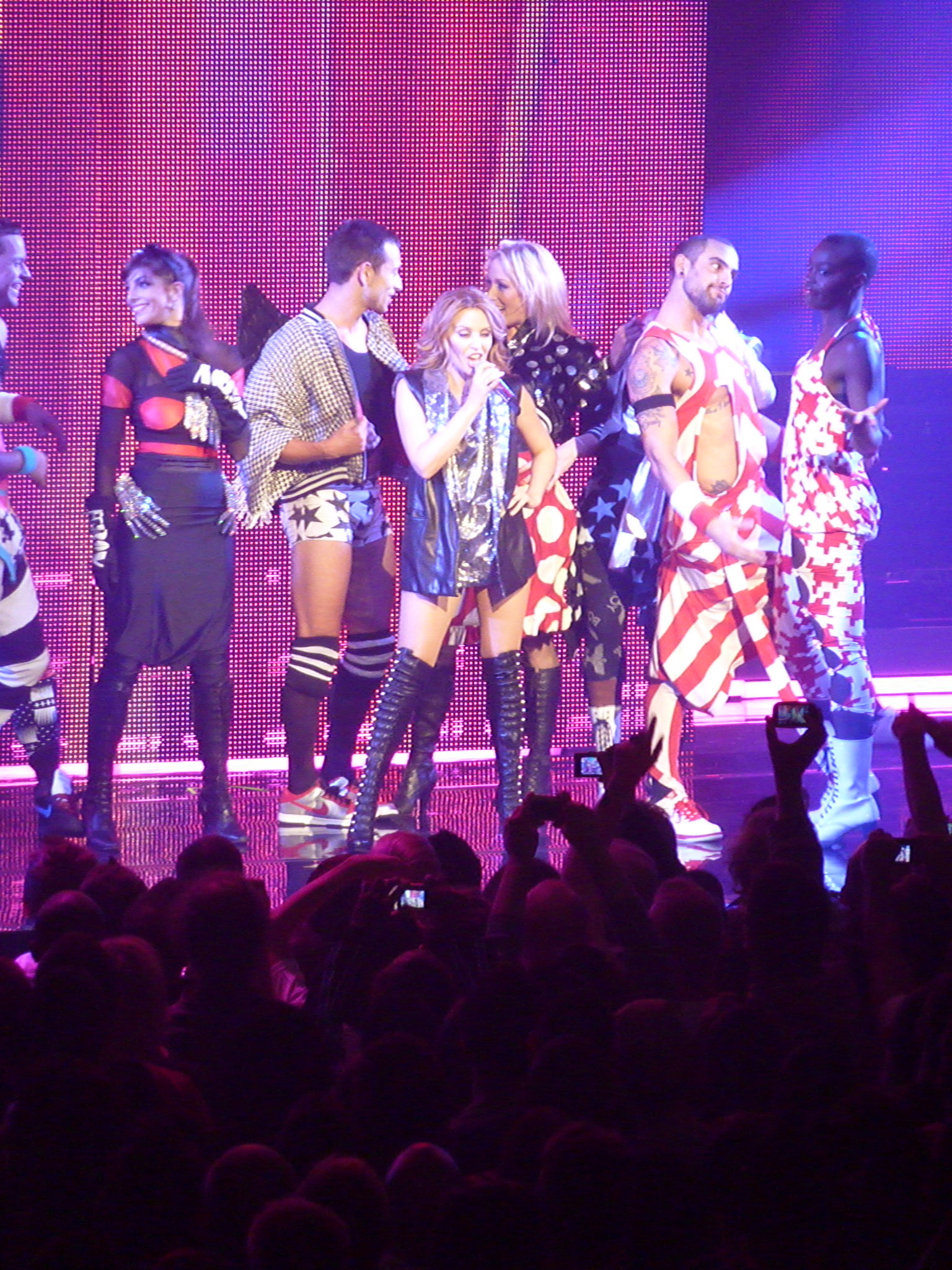
Minogue performing "Everything Taboo Medley" during For You, For Me Tour. The medley contains an excerpt of the song.

Kylie performed the song on the following concert tours:

- Let's Get to It Tour
- Showgirl: The Greatest Hits Tour (excerpt during the "Smiley Kylie Medley")
- Showgirl: The Homecoming Tour (excerpt during the "Everything Taboo Medley")
- For You, For Me Tour (excerpt during the "Everything Taboo Medley")

== Format and track listing ==
- Promotional Australian 12" single
1. "I Guess I Like It Like That" – 6:00
2. "I Guess I Like It Like That" (edit) – 3:45
3. "If You Were with Me Now" – 3:10

== Visionmasters & Tony King version ==
"Keep On Pumpin' It"

Single by Visionmasters & Tony King featuring Kylie Minogue
- Released: 4 November 1991
- Genre: Techno
- Length: 4:01 (Angelic Edit); 7:26 (Angelic Remix); 6:56 (Astral Flight Mix); 3:31 (Astral Flight Edit)
- Label: PWL
- Songwriters: Kylie Minogue; Mike Stock; Pete Waterman
- Producers: Stock; Waterman; Visionmasters; Tony King (Angelic Remix); Phil Harding (Astral Flight Mix)

Kylie Minogue singles chronology
"If You Were with Me Now" (1991)	"Keep On Pumpin' It" (1991)	"Give Me Just a Little More Time" (1992)

Audio videos
- "Keep on Pumpin' It" (Angelic Remix) on YouTube
- "Keep on Pumpin' It" (Astral Flight Mix Edit) on YouTube

"Keep On Pumpin' It" is a song by British producer duo Visionmasters (Paul Taylor and Danny Hybrid) and DJ Tony King featuring vocals by Australian singer Kylie Minogue. It samples Freestyle Orchestra's "Keep On Pumping It Up" and Minogue's vocals from her song "I Guess I Like It Like That". It was written by Minogue, Mike Stock and Pete Waterman. The single consists of two versions: the "Angelic Remix", which was mixed by Visionmasters, and the "Astral Flight Mix", which was mixed by producer Phil Harding.

=== Background and production ===
King previously remixed Minogue's track "Step Back in Time". On the back cover of the CD single, The Visionmasters were said to be "a concept born out of visions at Angels Burnley," a nightclub where Taylor held a residency at throughout the 1990s, and originated his Retro club night there.

=== Release and reception ===
This is the first featured single for Minogue. It was said to be her "classic underground club collaboration".

=== Formats and track listings ===
These are the formats and track listings of the major single releases.

- CD single
1. "Keep On Pumpin' It" (Angelic Edit) – 4:00
2. "Keep On Pumpin' It" (Angelic Remix) – 7:24
3. "Keep On Pumpin' It" (Astral Flight Mix) – 6:54
- 7" single
1. "Keep On Pumpin' It" (Angelic Edit) – 4:00
2. "Keep On Pumpin' It" (Astral Flight Edit) – 3:28
- 12" single
1. "Keep On Pumpin' It" (Angelic Remix) – 7:24
2. "Keep On Pumpin' It" (Astral Flight Mix) – 6:54
- iTunes digital bundle
  (Not available at time of original release. Released for the first time as part of iTunes PWL archive release in 2009.)
1. "Keep On Pumpin' It" (Angelic Edit) – 4:00
2. "Keep On Pumpin' It" (Angelic Remix) – 7:24
3. "Keep On Pumpin' It" (Astral Flight Mix) – 6:54
4. "Keep On Pumpin' It" (Astral Flight Mix Edit)
5. "Keep On Pumpin' It" (Astral Flight Dub)

=== Credits and personnel ===
Credits adapted from the CD single liner notes.

- Mike Stock – music producer, songwriter
- Pete Waterman – producer, songwriter
- Kylie Minogue – songwriter, vocals
- The Consul – sleeve design

engineer

- Mike Marsh – master
- Tim Burgess – vocals, songwriter
- Tappin Gofton – designer, art director
- Kam Tang – illustrator

=== Charts ===
Chart performance for "Keep On Pumpin' It"
Chart (1991)	Peak position
UK Singles (Official Charts)	49
UK Dance (Music Week)	29
