= Let's Get to It =

1991 album by Kylie Minogue

Studio album by Kylie Minogue
- Released: 14 October 1991
- Recorded: 1991
- Studio: PWL
- Genres: Dance-pop; hip-hop; new jack swing; house; R&B
- Length: 38:52
- Labels: Mushroom; PWL
- Producers: Mike Stock; Pete Waterman

Kylie Minogue chronology
Rhythm of Love (1990)	Let's Get to It (1991)	Greatest Hits (1992)

Singles from Let's Get to It
- 1. "Word Is Out" Released: 26 August 1991; 2. "If You Were with Me Now" Released: 21 October 1991; 3. "Give Me Just a Little More Time" Released: 13 January 1992; 4. "Finer Feelings" Released: 13 April 1992

Let's Get to It is the fourth studio album by Australian singer Kylie Minogue. It was the final studio album with Pete Waterman Limited (PWL), being released by the record label in the United Kingdom on 14 October 1991. Mushroom Records distributed the album in Australia on 25 November 1991. After Matt Aitken left the trio Stock Aitken Waterman (SAW) in early 1991, the remaining producers wanted to make another album with Minogue, although it was not a contractual obligation for her. Mike Stock and Pete Waterman agreed to share their songwriting credits with Minogue for the first time on six tracks. They spent months recording at PWL Studios, more time than any of her previous studio albums.

Musically, Let's Get to It varies in sound, with it including hip hop, new jack swing, house and dance-pop genres. Music critics provided mixed reviews, recognising Minogue's creative control and her provocative image despite them being ambivalent towards the production. The album is one of Minogue's least successful studio albums to date, missing the top 10 in both her native Australia and the UK. Nonetheless, it has since been certified gold in Australia by the Australian Recording Industry Association (ARIA).

Four singles were released from Let's Get to It, including UK top 10 entries "If You Were with Me Now" and "Give Me Just a Little More Time". The other singles, "Word Is Out" and "Finer Feelings", attained top 20 positions in the UK. Minogue further promoted the album with her Let's Get to It Tour, which traveled throughout Europe in October and November 1991. Minogue was disappointed with the final result and left PWL in 1992. The album was re-issued in the UK for the first time in 2015.

== Background ==
In 1990, Minogue released her third studio album Rhythm of Love, reflecting a more sexually liberated image and dance-influenced sound. She became more involved in the album's creation and arrangement than her previous projects alongside being credited as co-writer for the first time, while Stock Aitken Waterman (SAW) were the primary producers. Promotion for Rhythm of Love included controversial music videos for "Better the Devil You Know" and "What Do I Have to Do", which continued to foster Minogue's increasingly provocative image. Her romantic relationship with Australian rock band INXS's lead singer Michael Hutchence, one of her biggest influences during the production of Rhythm of Love, also generated intense publicity. In early 1991, Hutchence ended their 16-month relationship over the telephone.

After finishing the Rhythm of Love Tour, which spanned through Australia and Asia in February and March 1991, Minogue took a short break and spent time in Paris with her friends. Among them was British photographer Katerina Jebb, who later became a frequent collaborator of hers. She dated model Zane O'Donnell, who appears in the music videos for "What Do I Have to Do" and "Shocked". During the production of Rhythm of Love, SAW struggled to find an audience for their pop output. They were disappointed by the contemporary trends in music; Mike Stock commented: "We always tried to create pop hooks... By the 1990s, it was made by people who were off the heads on ecstasy. They'd be fascinated just with two notes going backwards and forwards." As a result, Matt Aitken left SAW in 1991 because he felt he was burnt out. "People say all our records sound the same, but it came to a point where they started sounding all the same to me," he said.

== Recording and production ==
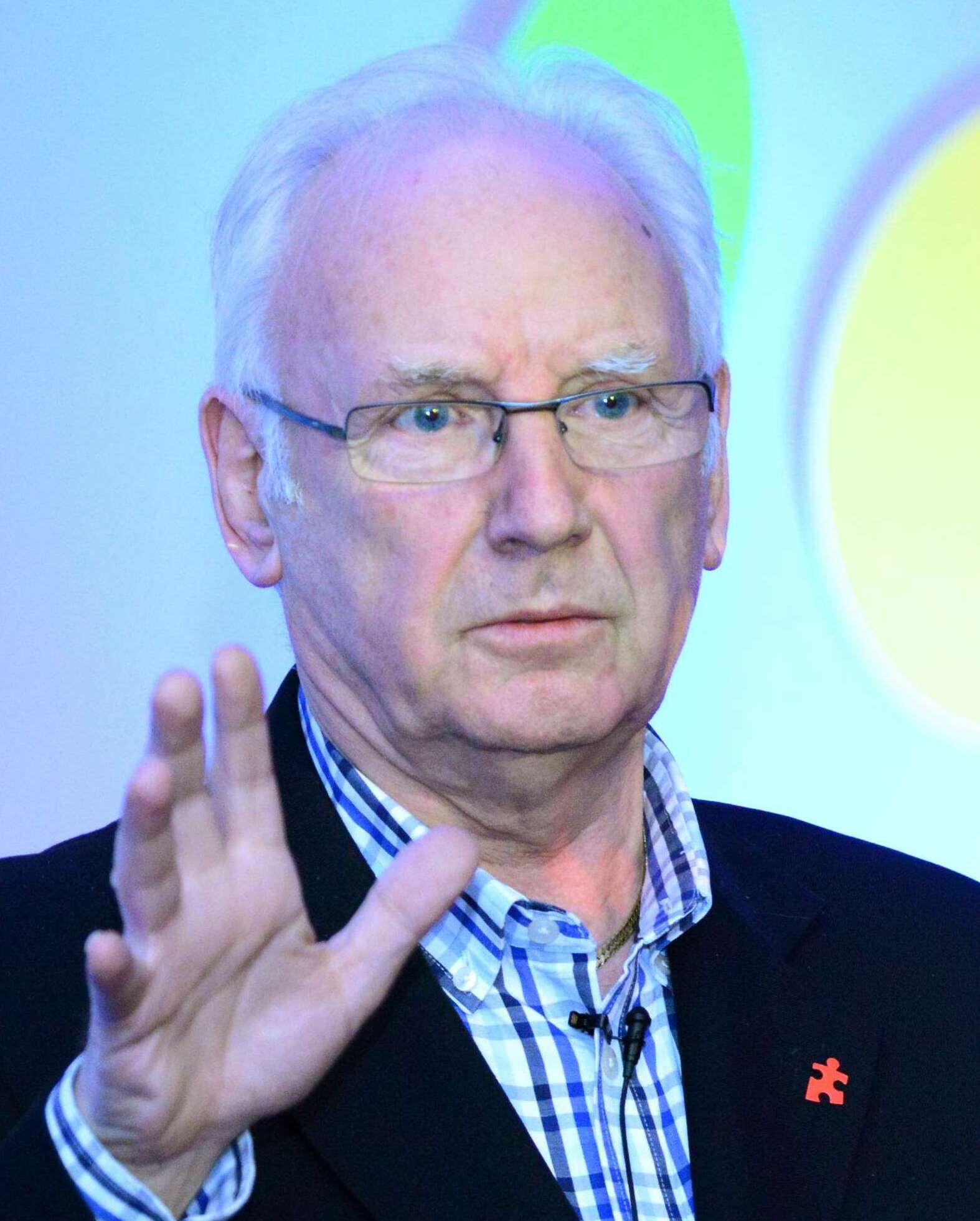
Minogue wrote and produced Let's Get to It alongside Mike Stock and Pete Waterman (pictured in 2014).

Let's Get to It was not a contractual obligation for Minogue; Pete Waterman Limited (PWL) had signed her initially for three studio albums. However, Pete Waterman and PWL co-owner David Howells wanted to make another album with her because of the commercial benefits. Stock contacted Minogue while she was in Paris and they both agreed to do it. While Minogue had been reticent about resigning, her manager Terry Blamey convinced her it would be a good creative opportunity to write with Stock. Over the course of 1991, Minogue left the city and returned to PWL Studios in London with her remaining producers Stock and Waterman. The two agreed to share their songwriting credits with Minogue for the first time; she was listed as a co-writer on six tracks out of the nine original tracks. Waterman would provide hints about the content and song titles, while Stock and Minogue put the songs together by humming different melodies and recording them within a day. She spent months working on Let's Get to It, more time than any of Minogue's earlier works.

During the production, club music and the London club scene fascinated Minogue. Although her music had always been played in commercial clubs, the pop element of her earlier works made the exclusive clubs look down on her. "If you go into Bowlers or you go into the Haçienda, you can't play 'I Should Be So Lucky' can you? They're going to lynch you!", Waterman said. To give herself more credibility with clubs, Minogue created an alias for herself as "Angel K" and released several white label promotional vinyls. The tracks released included "Do You Dare" and "Closer", which later appeared as B-sides on the singles "Give Me Just a Little More Time" and "Finer Feelings", respectively. Waterman also wanted to produce more "cutting edge dance music" for Minogue to fit in his show The Hitman and Her, which he considered a trendy show back then. Minogue suggested she hoped to find time for more recording in 1991, telling Smash Hits in August that she "may do some more writing in America which may lead to another recording there", but the recordings never materialised.

Waterman and PWL imported songs for Let's Get to It recorded by foreign acts like 2 Unlimited, whose song "Get Ready for This" (1991) is sampled heavily on "I Guess I Like It Like That". Their intention was to buy these songs cheaply and make a profit from them. Stock felt uninspired by this and the mostly sample-based album, saying: "There's no point having an artist like [Minogue] or a writer like me there if the rule is [buying] cheap from abroad." He composed "Finer Feelings" with Waterman, as Minogue wanted to put more sexual content on the album. Minogue and American singer Keith Washington wrote and recorded the duet "If You Were with Me Now" separately. It was her first duet on any of her albums; "Especially for You" was recorded previously for Jason Donovan's Ten Good Reasons (1989). One of the last tracks to be recorded for Let's Get to It was the cover of Chairmen of the Board's "Give Me Just a Little More Time" (1970).

== Music and lyrics ==
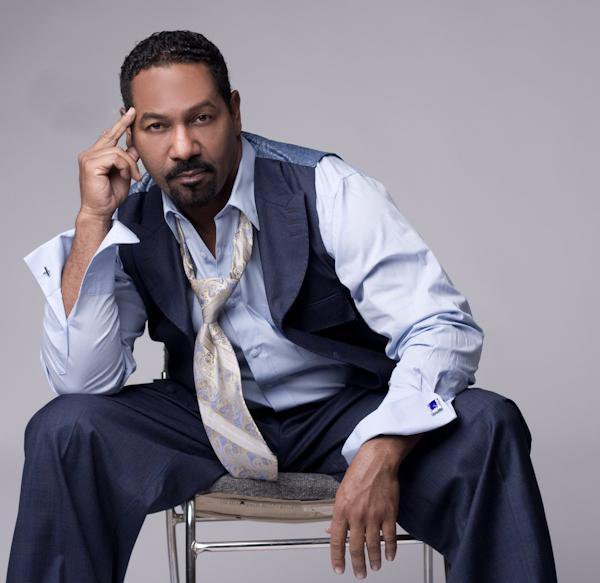
American R&B vocalist Keith Washington (pictured in 2012) co-wrote his duet with Minogue, "If You Were with Me Now".

Music critics identified Let's Get to It as a genre-spanning record, departing from the predominantly teen pop sound of Minogue's early works. Minogue stated her songs on the album ranging from "big band swing stuff to a more soulful kind of thing", and more sophisticated dance music. Chris True of AllMusic found the songs have "heavy breathing effects" and are as danceable as Rhythm of Love. Sal Cinquemani of Slant Magazine and Lee Barron noted the sounds of R&B, hip hop, new jack swing, and house are featured prominently on Let's Get to It. Nathan Wood of Foxtel's MaxTV called the album "a musical exploration". He felt Minogue's fondness for dance music began to emerge on the album, with forays into house and techno.

Let's Get to It opens with "Word Is Out", a new jack swing track with elements of jazz fusion. Minogue duplicated General Johnson's trademark vocal style on her cover of "Give Me Just a Little More Time". Joe Sweeney from PopMatters noted she puts more of her own personality into it than previous cover songs like "The Loco-Motion" or "Tears on My Pillow". The house track "Too Much of a Good Thing" is followed by "Finer Feelings", a song that includes a reference to Marvin Gaye's "Sexual Healing" (1982) in the chorus with the lyrics: "What is love without the finer feelings / It's just sex without the sexual healing." Digital Spy's Nick Levine felt that the lyrics show a "sexier and more sophisticated" side of Minogue. "If You Were with Me Now", Minogue's duet with Washington, is a non-sexual and string-drenched sentimental ballad.

Minogue urges her lover to "get this thing on the move" in the Cathy Dennis-influenced title track. "Right Here, Right Now", a house floor-filler track, follows it. Sweeney found the song has a similar groove vibe to the work of CeCe Peniston, while the title is the same as that of the 1990 song by British rock band Jesus Jones. It is entirely unrelated to the song of the same name that Minogue recorded with Italian producer Giorgio Moroder in 2015. Minogue sings about living life to the fullest in "Live and Learn", followed by the acoustic ballad "No World Without You". The six-minute techno-pop "I Guess I Like It Like That", which serves as the album's closer, includes grunting samples and a stadium keyboard part that lays the foundation of the song. The song contains a sample from 2 Unlimited's "Get Ready for This", and an uncredited interpolation of "I Like It Like That" (1988) by Salt-N-Pepa. Belgian producers Phil Wilde and Jean-Paul de Coster, who wrote and produced "Get Ready for This", were only credited as co-authors of "I Guess I Like It Like That" on the 2012 re-release of Let's Get to It in Japan.

== Artwork and release ==
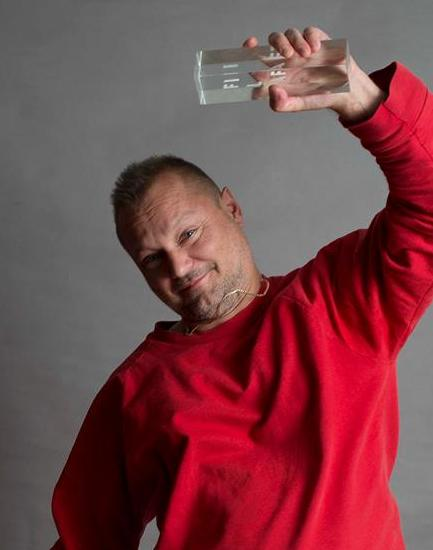
German fashion photographer Jürgen Teller (pictured in 2013) shot the album cover.

German fashion photographer Jürgen Teller produced the artwork for Let's Get to It. On the black-and-white cover, Minogue sports a 1960s-style bouffant and looks away from the camera, with three men partially shown in the background. She wears a sleeveless minidress that was designed by Nobuhiko Kitamura for Japanese fashion brand Hysteric Glamour. The minidress is a stretch lycra piece with multi-coloured vanity print and has shoestring spaghetti straps of the same fabric. Minogue found the cover interesting, saying it "will worry fans the most [with the] weird expression on my face". Oliver Hurley of Classic Pop felt that Minogue looked moody and the artwork was "a striking contrast to the grinning popstrel" of her previous image. Writing for Idolator, Mike Wass complimented the cover as "hip and edgy", and commented that "[Minogue] was entering her cool phase." True commented that the sinister cover, and the title, helped Minogue transform fully "from her innocent dance-pop image to what the press dubbed 'SexKylie'", and described her as a "self-made sex kitten". In 2004, Minogue donated the dress worn for the cover shot to the Cultural Gifts Program of the Arts Centre Melbourne.

Minogue named the album Let's Get to It; she first revealed the title on 31 August 1991 while she was performing "Word Is Out" on the children's television series Motormouth. It was her final studio album under PWL released in the UK on 14 October 1991. Mushroom Records released the album in Australia on 25 November 1991. In Japan, it was first released on 21 November 1991 by PWL under the title of あなたもM？ (Are you M too?), with instrumental bonus tracks. WEA re-released it twice Let's Get to It in 1993 and 1995, respectively, and PWL reissued it in 2012 with bonus tracks and mixes. In October 2014, it was announced Let's Get to It, along with Minogue's studio albums Kylie (1988), Enjoy Yourself (1989), and Rhythm of Love, was to be re-released by Cherry Red Records and PWL. The original release date of 27 October 2014 was later postponed to 9 February 2015. The albums were digitally remastered from the original studio tapes and were made available on vinyl, CD, and DVD. This was the first time these albums had been re-released in the UK.

Minogue's VHS release Let's Get To...The Videos included music videos from Rhythm of Love and Let's Get to It, as well as exclusive behind-the-scenes footage. It was released in 1991 by Mushroom Records in Australia, and by PWL in the UK and Japan. Kylie's Remixes: Vol. 2, an eleven-track compilation of remixed songs from Rhythm of Love and Let's Get to It, was released across Japan in July 1992. It peaked at number 90 on the Oricon Albums Chart and had sold 7,330 copies by 2006. The compilation album was later released in Australia in 1993.

== Promotion ==
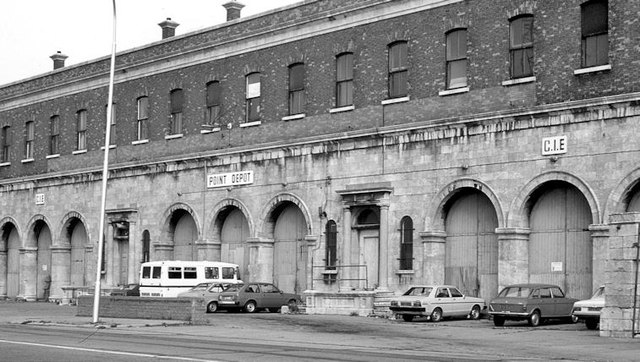
The final show of the Let's Get to It Tour at the Point Theatre, Dublin (pictured in 1983) on 8 November 1991 was recorded and released on video albums in 1991 and 2011.

To promote Let's Get to It, Minogue visited Europe with the Let's Get to It Tour in October and November 1991. The tour was an updated version of her Rhythm of Love Tour, featuring a new stage wardrobe curated by fashion designer John Galliano. The costumes included a plastic raincoat, a black fishnet costume with garter, a black evening dress, pointy bras, and tight black shorts. The choreography was more suggestive: Minogue danced, rubbed her cleavage in her chief choreographer Venol King, and pinned him to the floor. The tracklist contains a performance of "Shocked", featuring rapper Jazzi P. Like the Rhythm of Love Tour, Minogue received criticism of provocative nature for the Let's Get to It Tour, which was decried as "pornographic", and received comparisons to Madonna's Who's That Girl World Tour (1987). The British press was fascinated with Minogue's provocative image and dubbed her "SexKylie". EMI released the video album Live! internationally in 1992, which included footage shot during the last show of the Let's Get to It Tour at the Point Theatre, Dublin on 8 November 1991. Mushroom Records distributed the video album in Australia under the title Live in Dublin. In 2011, Immortal Records released other footage from the same night, also titled Live in Dublin, in Europe.

=== Singles ===
"Word Is Out" was released as Let's Get to It's lead single in August 1991, with "Say the Word – I'll Be There" as the B-side track, which she had recorded in May of that year. The single was available as a limited edition 12" Summer Breeze mix, which "radically remixed" and reduced "the synthesised band sound" from the original version. Mushroom Records released the remix in Australia, featuring Minogue's autograph on the B-side of the disc. Filmed at Camden Lock, James Lebon directed the music video for "Word is Out". It features English TV presenter Davina McCall, and Minogue is seen seductively dancing in stockings and suspenders on the streets. The video was criticised by Stock and Waterman, who felt the sexualised imagery alienated Minogue's fans. Her accompanying TV promotion followed the same sexual theme. "Word Is Out" peaked at number 16 on the UK Singles Chart, becoming Minogue's first single to not reach the top 10 and this broke her run of 13 consecutive top 10 singles. However, it reached number 10 in Australia, and number eight in Ireland.

The album's second single "If You Were with Me Now", a duet by Minogue and Washington, was released in October 1991. A music video, directed by Greg Masuak, accompanied it. Minogue and Washington met briefly on the set for the first time before the video was shot. Masuak opted not to feature any shots of Minogue and Washington together. "If You Were with Me Now" reached number four in the UK, becoming Minogue's first co-written top five hit and Washington's last top 40 appearance there. It also peaked at number seven in Ireland, and number 23 in Australia. "Give Me Just a Little More Time" was released as the third single in January 1992, being accompanied by a music video directed by Masuak. It peaked at number two on the UK Singles Chart, standing as the highest-charting single from Let's Get to It. The song also reached the top 20 in Ireland and Belgium. The 12" single was released with the B-side "Do You Dare". "Finer Feelings" was originally planned as the second single, but "If You Were with Me Now" replaced it. Brothers in Rhythm ultimately released the song in April 1992 as a 12" remix. They later became collaborators of Minogue's throughout the 1990s. The remix is nearly seven-minutes long, and later became the 7" radio version as well. "Closer" was also released as the B-side single. The single peaked in the top 20 of the UK and Ireland. An accompanying black-and-white music video, directed by Dave Hogan, was shot entirely in Paris.

== Critical reception ==
Professional ratings
Review scores
Source	Rating
AllMusic	2.5/5 stars
Digital Spy	4/5 stars
Encyclopedia of Popular Music	2/5 stars
NME	7/10
PopMatters	6/10 stars
Select	3/5 medals
Smash Hits	5/10 stars

Let's Get to It was met with mixed reviews from music critics. True and Sweeney praised Minogue for co-writing most of the album and taking more control of her career. However, they felt the album sounds unnatural and more dated than Rhythm of Love. Griffiths hailed it as her best album because of the improved production, but still viewed it as a "false tease" and admitted that Minogue's music "is still for virgins, even if they now read The Face". Betty Page of NME wrote that Minogue had made an "exceedingly good pop record", praising her strong vocal performance on "No World without You". A writer from Australian programme Rage opined that the album had been successful in showcasing a more seductive side of hers. Mark Andrews of Smash Hits and Oliver Hurley were less impressed with the album's ill-advised R&B influence, saying that Aitken's absence was notable and the material is forgettable. Levine commented that the album "lacks a moment of pure pop brilliance" to match Minogue's earlier works.

Retrospect reviews by Cinquemani, True, and Hurley viewed the album as a clear statement for Minogue's departure from PWL, whose musical relationship had become too restrictive. In 2018, Cinquemani wrote that none of the musical genres featured on the album were particularly flourishing, and compared SAW-produced tracks unfavorably to the American sounds of Clivillés and Cole, Jam and Lewis, and Full Force. He ranked it as Minogue's third-worst studio album. A writer from Classic Pop magazine ranked it as the eighth-best Stock Aitken Waterman album, deeming it as a bold statement. Wood highlighted "I Guess I Like it Like That" as a signal of her transformation into an artist with diverse genres, and paved the way for her next dance-oriented releases. In the biography Kylie: Naked (2012), Nigel Goodall and Jenny Stanley-Clarke called it her first album to have "a personal feel, with influences from her own tastes in music". The album was Minogue's only studio album, apart from her 1994 self-titled album, to receive a two-star rating from British writer Colin Larkin in the Encyclopedia of Popular Music (2011), who classified it as "disappointing", "weak or dull and not recommended".

Despite the mixed critical reception, Minogue received a nomination for Best Female Artist at the ARIA Music Awards of 1992 as a result of her work on Let's Get to It. It was her third nomination in the category, following nominations for Kylie in 1989 and Enjoy Yourself in 1990. Minogue lost the award to Australian singer-songwriter Deborah Conway for her album String of Pearls (1992).

== Commercial performance and aftermath ==
Let's Get to It is among Minogue's least successful albums to date. It debuted and peaked at number 15 on the UK Albums Chart after initially being released, becoming her first and only studio album to not reach the top 10. In January 1992, the album re-entered at number 68 for one week. When "Give Me Just a Little More Time" reached its peak at number two on the UK Singles Chart, Let's Get to It returned to the UK Albums Chart at number 50. The album lasted for a total of 12 weeks on the chart, the shortest run by a Minogue studio album at the time. In her native Australia, it peaked at number 13 and spent only five weeks on the chart. Nevertheless, Let's Get to It was certified gold by Australian Recording Industry Association (ARIA) for selling 35,000 copies in the country in March 1992. Let's Get to It peaked at number 37 on the Oricon Albums Chart, becoming Minogue's third consecutive top 40 entry in Japan. It remained on the chart for three weeks, and has sold 25,350 copies as of 2006. On the European Top 100 Albums, a chart compiled by Music & Media, it peaked at number 59 on the week of 9 November 1991.

The lack of public interest in Let's Get to It was discussed, which pointed towards the "SexKylie" image and the change in musical direction. "The public saw [Minogue] dressed as a prostitute, and they wouldn't accept it," said Waterman. Minogue was disappointed with the album, feeling that SAW had reverted to formulaic tunes and by the time Let's Get to It came, "the magic [had] gone and the record sank quickly". Besides from work commitments, she spent much of 1992 being away from the public. By the end of 1992, PWL did not renew the contract with Minogue, who felt the singer "was [not] moving in a direction that was going to be successful", according to PWL co-owner David Howells. Following her release from the label, Minogue stated that she felt stifled by SAW, saying in an interview with Q in 1994: "I was very much a puppet in the beginning. I was blinkered by my record company. I was unable to look left or right". Minogue's final release under PWL was Greatest Hits (1992). In a 2015 interview, Waterman said that he already knew Let's Get to It was Minogue's final studio album with SAW during the making of it, saying Minogue "was overshadowing us and killing our creativity... we should have actually sold that album before we made it."

== Track listing ==
All songs produced by Mike Stock and Pete Waterman.

Let's Get to It – Standard version
No.	Title	Writer(s)	Length
1.	"Word Is Out"	Mike Stock; Pete Waterman	3:35
2.	"Give Me Just a Little More Time"	Ronald Dunbar; Edyth Wayne	3:08
3.	"Too Much of a Good Thing"	Kylie Minogue; Stock; Waterman	4:23
4.	"Finer Feelings"	Stock; Waterman	3:52
5.	"If You Were with Me Now" (duet with Keith Washington)	Minogue; Stock; Waterman; Keith Washington	3:10
6.	"Let's Get to It"	Stock; Waterman	4:49
7.	"Right Here, Right Now"	Minogue; Stock; Waterman	3:53
8.	"Live and Learn"	Minogue; Stock; Waterman	3:14
9.	"No World Without You"	Minogue; Stock; Waterman	2:45
10.	"I Guess I Like It Like That"	Minogue; Stock; Waterman; Phil Wilde; Jean-Paul de Coster	6:00
Total length:			38:52

Let's Get to It – 1991 Japanese bonus 3-inch CD
No.	Title	Length
1.	"Word Is Out" (Instrumental)	3:35
2.	"What Do I Have to Do" (Instrumental)	3:48
3.	"Step Back in Time" (Instrumental)	3:29
Total length:		10:52

Let's Get to It – 2012 Japanese reissue bonus tracks
No.	Title	Writer(s)	Length
11.	"Do You Dare?" (NRG Edit)	Minogue; Stock; Waterman	3:20
12.	"Closer" (The Pleasure Mix)	Minogue; Stock; Waterman	6:47
13.	"Say the Word – I'll Be There"	Minogue; Stock; Waterman	4:11
14.	"Word Is Out" (Summer Breeze 12" Mix)		7:45
15.	"If You Were With Me Now" (Extended version)		5:08
16.	"Give Me Just a Little More Time" (Extended version)		4:33
17.	"Finer Feelings" (Brothers in Rhythm 12" Mix)		6:48
Total length:			67:24

Let's Get to It – 2015 reissue deluxe version (Disc 1)
No.	Title	Length
11.	"Say the Word – I'll Be There"	4:11
12.	"Do You Dare?" (NRG Edit)	3:20
13.	"Closer" (Edit)	3:57
14.	"Keep On Pumpin' It" (Angelic Remix Edit)	4:02
15.	"Word Is Out" (Extended version)	5:51
16.	"If You Were With Me Now" (Extended version)	5:08
17.	"Give Me Just a Little More Time" (Extended version)	4:34
18.	"Finer Feelings" (Brothers in Rhythm 12" Mix)	6:48
Total length:		76:43

Let's Get to It – 2015 reissue deluxe version (Disc 2)
No.	Title	Length
1.	"Keep On Pumpin' It" (Angelic Remix)	7:22
2.	"Do You Dare?" (NRG Mix)	7:05
3.	"Closer" (The Pleasure Mix)	6:47
4.	"Word Is Out" (Summer Breeze Mix)	7:45
5.	"Too Much of a Good Thing" (Original 12" Mix)	5:51
6.	"Let's Get to It" (Tony King 12" Mix)	5:59
7.	"Right Here, Right Now" (Tony King 12" Mix)	7:55
8.	"Live and Learn" (Original 12" Mix)	5:56
9.	"Keep On Pumpin' It" (Astral Flight Mix)	6:51
10.	"Do You Dare?" (New Rave Mix)	6:40
11.	"No World Without You" (Original Mix)	2:53
12.	"If You Were With Me Now" (Orchestral Mix)	3:10
13.	"Finer Feelings" (Brothers in Rhythm Dub)	4:09
Total length:		78:23

Let's Get to It – 2015 reissue deluxe version (Disc 3)
No.	Title	Length
1.	"Word Is Out" (music video)	3:44
2.	"If You Were With Me Now" (music video)	3:13
3.	"Give Me Just a Little More Time" (music video)	3:14
4.	"Finer Feelings" (music video)	3:52
5.	"What Kind of Fool (Heard All That Before)" (music video)	3:53
6.	"Celebration" (music video)	4:00
7.	"Word Is Out" (Australian version, part of the bonus footage section)	3:44
8.	"Thank Yous" (Part of the bonus footage section)
9.	"Word Is Out" (Live on Wogan)
10.	"Word Is Out" (Live on Top of the Pops)
11.	"Give Me Just a Little More Time" (Live on Going Live!)
12.	"Finer Feelings" (Live on Top of the Pops)
13.	"What Kind of Fool (Heard All That Before)" (Live on Top of the Pops)
14.	"Celebration" (Live on Top of the Pops)
15.	"Celebration" (Live at the Smash Hits Poll Winner's Party)

Let's Get to... the Videos – VHS version
No.	Title	Length
1.	"Intro"	1:27
2.	"Better the Devil You Know" (music video)	3:55
3.	"Step Back in Time" (Behind the scenes)	0:58
4.	"Step Back in Time" (music video)	3:08
5.	"What Do I Have to Do?" (Behind the scenes)	3:28
6.	"What Do I Have to Do?" (music video)	3:30
7.	"Shocked" (music video)	3:08
8.	"Word Is Out" (music video)	3:42
9.	"Outro"	0:41
10.	"If You Were With Me Now" (music video)	3:13
11.	"Credits"	0:26
Total length:		27:36

Kylie's Remixes: Vol. 2
No.	Title	Length
1.	"Better the Devil You Know" (U.S. Remix)	6:03
2.	"Step Back in Time" (Walkin' Rhythm Mix)	7:58
3.	"What Do I Have to Do?" (Between the Sheets Remix)	7:06
4.	"Shocked" (DNA 12" Mix)	6:14
5.	"Word Is Out" (12" version)	5:53
6.	"If You Were With Me Now" (Extended version, with Keith Washington)	5:08
7.	"Keep On Pumpin' It" (Angelic Remix)	7:22
8.	"Give Me Just a Little More Time" (12" version)	4:36
9.	"Finer Feelings" (Brothers in Rhythm 12" Mix)	6:48
10.	"Do You Dare?" (NRG Mix)	7:05
11.	"Closer" (The Pleasure Mix)	6:47
Total length:		71:00

Notes

- The Summer Breeze 7" edit of "Word Is Out" was used for the Australian release.
- "I Guess I Like It Like That" samples 2 Unlimited's "Get Ready For This" (1991) and contains an uncredited interpolation of Salt-N-Pepa's "I Like It Like That" (1988). Belgian producers Phil Wilde and Jean-Paul de Coster, who wrote and produced "Get Ready for This", were only credited as co-authors in the 2012 re-release in Japan.

== Personnel ==
Adapted from the album's liner notes.

- Kylie Minogue – lead vocals
- Julian Gingell – keyboards
- Mike Stock – keyboards, arrangement, backing vocals, production
- Gary Barnacle – saxophone
- Paul Riser – arrangement
- Pete Waterman – arrangement, engineering assistance, production
- Keith Washington – vocals on track 5
- Lance Ellington – backing vocals
- Tee Green – backing vocals
- Phil Harding – backing vocals
- Carol Kenyon – backing vocals
- Mae McKenna – backing vocals
- Leroy Osbourne – backing vocals
- Miriam Stockley – backing vocals
- Mick Wilson – backing vocals
- Dave Ford – mixing
- Peter Day – engineering
- Gordon Dennis – engineering
- Matt Le Flem – engineering assistance
- Jason Barron – engineering assistance
- Dean Murphy – engineering assistance
- Dillon Gallagher – engineering assistance
- Chris McDonnell – engineering assistance
- Les Sharma – engineering assistance
- Juergen Teller – photography

== Charts ==
Chart performance for Let's Get to It in 1991
Chart (1991)	Peak position
Australian Albums (ARIA)	13
European Albums (Music & Media)	59
Japanese Albums (Oricon)	37
UK Albums (OCC)	15

== Certifications and sales ==
Certifications and sales for Let's Get to It
Region	Certification	Certified units/sales
Australia (ARIA)	Gold	35,000^{^}
Japan	—	25,350
^{^} Shipments figures based on certification alone.

== Release history ==
Release dates and formats for Let's Get to It
Region	Date	Format(s)	Label(s)	Ref(s).
United Kingdom	14 October 1991	CD; cassette; LP	PWL	
Australia	25 November 1991	CD; cassette; LP	Mushroom Records	
Japan	21 November 1991	CD; cassette; LP	PWL	
Japan	10 July 1993	CD	WEA	
Japan	25 April 1995	CD	WEA	
Australia	29 September 1998	CD	Mushroom Records	
Japan	7 November 2012	CD	PWL	
United Kingdom	9 February 2015	CD; DVD; LP	Cherry Red; PWL	
Japan	9 February 2015	CD; DVD; LP	Cherry Red; PWL	
