= Finer Feelings =

1992 single by Kylie Minogue

Single by Kylie Minogue

from the album Let's Get to It
- B-side: "Closer"
- Released: 13 April 1992
- Studio: PWL (London, England)
- Length: 3:55
- Label: Mushroom; PWL
- Songwriters: Mike Stock; Pete Waterman
- Producers: Mike Stock; Pete Waterman; Brothers in Rhythm (remix)

Kylie Minogue singles chronology
| "Give Me Just a Little More Time" (1992) | "Finer Feelings" (1992) | "What Kind of Fool (Heard All That Before)" (1992) |

Music video
- "Finer Feelings" on YouTube

"Finer Feelings" is a song by Australian singer Kylie Minogue. It was the final release from her fourth album, Let's Get to It (1991), and was planned as the follow-up to "Word Is Out", but it was held back after the release of "If You Were with Me Now". "Finer Feelings" finally appeared in April 1992, remixed by Brothers in Rhythm (whom Minogue would continue collaborating with throughout the 1990s, and continued with Steve Anderson into the present), and narrowly missed out on the top 10, peaking at number 11 on the UK charts.

In Australia, "Finer Feelings" reached number 60 on the ARIA Singles Chart for the week ending 5 July 1992. The song's B-side, "Closer", is different from the song of the same title that would appear on her 2010 album Aphrodite. "Finer Feelings" was re-recorded in 2011 and posted onto Kylie Minogue's official YouTube channel on 25 January 2012. It is featured on The Abbey Road Sessions.

== Critical reception ==
Brittany Porter from AXS listed the track as one of her five most underrated songs. Writing for Digital Spy, Nick Levine called it a "hidden gem" and stated: "At least five tunes are in contention, 'Finer Feelings' sneaks it for showing that Kylie could be sexier and more sophisticated than ever before without skimping on the chorus." Music Week stated that it is Minogue "at her most mature and reflective", and added that "percussive and rhythmic accentuation are subtle rather than florid, and Kylie's vocal is amongst her best. Sweetly melancholic, and if she does now move on from PWL, it's a fine note to leave on". In 2023, Robert Moran of Australian daily tabloid newspaper The Sydney Morning Herald ranked the song as Minogue's 10th best song (out of 183), describing it "a dark, slinky, provocative song about her sexual desire with a bizarre earworm of a chorus. So underrated". In 2024, British magazine Classic Pop ranked the song at number 26 in its list of "Top 40 Kylie Minogue songs", describing it as a "smooth, soulful, underrated single".

== Formats and track listings ==
- CD single
1. "Finer Feelings" (Brothers in Rhythm 7-inch mix) – 3:47
2. "Finer Feelings" (Brothers in Rhythm 12-inch mix) – 6:47
3. "Finer Feelings" (original mix/album version) – 3:55
4. "Closer" (The Pleasure Mix)
- 7-inch and cassette single
1. "Finer Feelings" (Brothers in Rhythm 7-inch mix) – 3:47
2. "Closer" (edit)
- 12-inch single
1. "Finer Feelings" (Brothers in Rhythm 12" mix) – 6:47
2. "Closer" (The Pleasure Mix)

== Charts ==
Weekly chart performance for "Finer Feelings"
| Chart (1992) | Peak position |
|---|---|
| Australia (ARIA) | 60 |
| Europe (Eurochart Hot 100) | 38 |
| Ireland (IRMA) | 16 |
| UK Singles (Official Charts) | 11 |
| UK Airplay (Music Week) | 12 |
| UK Dance Music (Music Week) | 54 |

== Release history ==
Release dates and formats for "Finer Feelings"
| Region | Date | Format(s) | Label(s) | Ref. |
|---|---|---|---|---|
| United Kingdom | 13 April 1992 | 7-inch vinyl; 12-inch vinyl; CD; cassette | PWL | |
| Japan | 1 May 1992 | CD | PWL | |
| Australia | 22 June 1992 | 12-inch vinyl; CD; cassette | Mushroom | |
