= Word Is Out =

1991 single by Kylie Minogue

Single by Kylie Minogue

from the album Let's Get to It
- B-side: "Say the Word - I'll Be There"
- Released: 26 August 1991
- Studio: PWL (London, England)
- Genre: New jack swing; R&B
- Length: 3:34
- Label: Mushroom; PWL
- Songwriters: Mike Stock; Pete Waterman
- Producers: Mike Stock; Pete Waterman

Kylie Minogue singles chronology
"Shocked" (1991)	"Word Is Out" (1991)	"If You Were with Me Now" (1991)

Music video
- "Word Is Out" on YouTube

"Word Is Out" is a song by Australian singer and songwriter Kylie Minogue, recorded for her fourth studio album Let's Get to It (1991). Written and produced by English production team Mike Stock and Pete Waterman, without Matt Aitken who had left the SAW team by then, it was released as the lead single to the record on 26 August 1991 by Mushroom and PWL. A departure from her previous music, the track aimed to replicate the swing beat sound, with "New York City" by American R&B group Guy serving as the main plot track. The artwork for the cover was photographed by Ellen Von Unwerth in 1991 for the British edition of Esquire.

The track received favorable reviews from music critics and has gone on to be named one of Minogue's most underrated singles. In the United Kingdom, the track broke her streak of top-10 hits when it debuted at number 16 on the singles chart there. The track did however crack the top ten in Minogue's native Australia and Ireland but had no success in mainland Europe. The accompanying music video was directed by James Lebon.

== Critical reception ==
Chris True from AllMusic named the track one of Let's Get to It's track picks. Larry Flick from Billboard magazine commented, "Folks who think Kylie Minogue is too light for them may change their minds when they hear 'Word Is Out'. With a little help from remixer Tony King, she has eschewed the frothy hi-NRG tone of past hits in favor of an easy paced-house sound, replete with disco-flavored strings and percussion." On Michael Wilton's review of the second night of her Anti Tour in Sydney, Australia—where she performed an a cappella rendition of the song—for musicOMH, he stated that "Word is Out" is "wildly underrated." Writing Minogue's biography for her special on Australian music video program Rage, they stated: "While in the past, her material had always been high energy, 'Word Is Out' showcased a far more seductive side to Kylie that many had suspected was there." In another hand, Nick Griffiths from Select called it one of the "odd songs" in the album. Sophie Lawrence reviewed it for Smash Hits, writing, "Sounds like Madonna's 'La Isla Bonita' a bit, doesn't it? She's just been brilliant ever since 'Better The Devil You Know'. You could listen to this 100 times and never get bored." In 2023, Robert Moran of Australian daily tabloid newspaper The Sydney Morning Herald ranked the song as Minogue's 168th best song (out of 183).

== Commercial performance ==
The song was released as the first single in the summer of 1991 and was a top-20 hit in the United Kingdom, reaching number 16 and ending Minogue's run of 13 consecutive UK top-10 hits. In Australia, with the more laid back Summer Breeze Mix as the main mix, it peaked at number 10, becoming Minogue's 10th single to chart within the top 10. The Summer Breeze Mix received a UK release on a one-sided limited edition 12-inch vinyl single that has an engraved autograph on the B-side, making it highly collectable for fans.

== Music video ==
Directed by James Lebon, it was filmed in London's famous Camden market and featured British television presenter Davina McCall as one of Minogue's dancers. An Australian version of the video later appeared on her 2002 (also the updated version in 2003) Greatest Hits DVD as one of the bonus features. The video was criticised by both Mike Stock and Pete Waterman, who felt the aesthetic allusions to street prostitution alienated Kylie's fanbase and contributed to the single's underwhelming chart performance.

== Live performances ==
Minogue also did an a cappella "sing-along" rendition of the song as requested by fans on her Anti Tour's concert in Big Top at Luna Park, Sydney, Australia on 20 March 2012. musicOMH's Michael Wilton said the performance was "decent."

- Let's Get to It Tour
- Showgirl: The Homecoming Tour (Impromptu a capella performance during technical difficulties)
- Anti Tour (Acapella performance in Sydney)

== Track listings ==
- Australian CD and cassette single
1. "Word Is Out" – 3:41
2. "Say the Word - I'll Be There" – 4:00
3. "Word Is Out" (Summer Breeze 12-inch mix) – 7:41
- Australian 12-inch single

A1. "Word Is Out" (Summer Breeze 12-inch mix) – 7:41
A2. "Word Is Out" (instrumental) – 3:31
B1. "Word Is Out" (UK 12-inch mix) – 5:53
B2. "Say the Word - I'll Be There" – 4:00

- UK 7-inch and cassette single
1. "Word Is Out" – 3:34
2. "Say the Word - I'll Be There" – 4:00
- UK 12-inch single

A1. "Word Is Out" – 5:53
B1. "Say the Word - I'll Be There" – 4:00
B2. "Word Is Out" (instrumental) – 3:31

- UK and Japanese CD single
1. "Word Is Out" (7-inch version) – 3:34
2. "Word Is Out" (12-inch version) – 5:53
3. "Say the Word - I'll Be There" – 4:00

== Charts ==
Chart (1991)	Peak position
Australia (ARIA)	10
Europe (Eurochart Hot 100)	37
European Airplay Top 50 (Music & Media)	35
European Hit Radio (Music & Media)	32
Ireland (IRMA)	8
Luxembourg (Radio Luxembourg)	8
UK Singles (OCC)	16
UK Airplay (Music Week)	8

== Release history ==
Region	Date	Format(s)	Label(s)	Ref.
United Kingdom	26 August 1991	7-inch vinyl; 12-inch vinyl; CD; cassette	PWL	
Japan	21 October 1991	CD	PWL	
Australia	18 November 1991	12-inch vinyl; CD; cassette	Mushroom	
