= If You Were with Me Now =

1991 single by Kylie Minogue and Keith Washington

Single by Kylie Minogue and Keith Washington

from the album Let's Get to It
- B-side: "I Guess I Like It Like That"
- Released: 21 October 1991
- Studio: PWL (London, England)
- Length: 3:11
- Label: Mushroom; PWL
- Songwriters: Mike Stock; Kylie Minogue; Pete Waterman; Keith Washington
- Producers: Mike Stock; Pete Waterman

Kylie Minogue singles chronology
"Word Is Out" (1991)	"If You Were with Me Now" (1991)	"Keep on Pumpin' It" (1991)

Keith Washington singles chronology
"Are You Still in Love with Me" (1991)	"If You Were with Me Now" (1991)	"Make Time for Love" (1992)

Music video
- "If You Were with Me Now" on YouTube

"If You Were with Me Now" is a song by Australian pop singer Kylie Minogue and American R&B singer Keith Washington. It was written by Minogue, Washington, and British songwriting team Mike Stock and Pete Waterman for Minogue's fourth studio album, Let's Get to It (1991). The song was produced by Stock and Waterman. The song was released as the second single on 21 October 1991 by Mushroom Records and PWL Records. It reached number four on the UK Singles Chart, peaked at number seven in Ireland, and entered the top 30 in Australia. The song is Minogue's first hit single to feature her as a co-writer.

== Critical reception ==
Digital Spy's Nick Levine called the track a "slushy duet". Betty Page from NME wrote, "As for "If You Were Here with Me Now", well, I predict the world will be hearing an awful lot of this, probably around Christmas. It's a duet with 'mystery singer' Keith Washington, who sounds like Son Of Lionel but could be helping Kylie to be the Big American Hit. It's oozingly schmaltzy and is probably a brilliant career move." Writing Minogue's biography for her special on Australian music video programme Rage, they called the song one of the "richly beautiful ballads". In 2023, Robert Moran of Australian daily tabloid newspaper The Sydney Morning Herald ranked the song as Minogue's 178th best song (out of 183), adding that sounds like "a play for the Aladdin soundtrack".

== Track listings ==
- Australian and UK CD single
1. "If You Were with Me Now" – 3:10
2. "I Guess I Like It Like That" – 5:59
3. "If You Were with Me Now" (extended version) – 5:06
- Australian and UK cassette single, UK 7-inch single
1. "If You Were with Me Now" – 3:10
2. "I Guess I Like It Like That" – 3:30
- UK 12-inch single
1. "If You Were with Me Now" – 5:06
2. "I Guess I Like It Like That" – 5:59

== Charts ==
=== Weekly charts ===
Chart (1991)	Peak position
Australia (ARIA)	23
Belgium (Ultratop 50 Flanders)	31
Europe (Eurochart Hot 100)	18
Europe (European Hit Radio)	20
Germany (GfK)	61
Ireland (IRMA)	7
Luxembourg (Radio Luxembourg)	3
Netherlands (Dutch Top 40 Tipparade)	9
Netherlands (Single Top 100)	56
UK Singles (OCC)	4
UK Airplay (Music Week)	4

=== Year-end charts ===
Chart (1991)	Position
UK Singles (OCC)	91

== Release history ==
Region	Date	Format(s)	Label(s)	Ref.
United Kingdom	21 October 1991	7-inch vinyl; 12-inch vinyl; CD; cassette	PWL	
Japan	1 December 1991	Mini-CD	Alfa	
Australia	20 January 1992	CD; cassette	Mushroom	
