= What Kind of Fool (Heard All That Before) =

1992 single by Kylie Minogue

Single by Kylie Minogue

from the album Greatest Hits
- B-side: "Things Can Only Get Better"
- Released: 10 August 1992
- Studio: London, England
- Length: 3:55
- Label: Mushroom; PWL International
- Songwriters: Mike Stock; Kylie Minogue; Pete Waterman
- Producers: Mike Stock; Pete Waterman

Kylie Minogue singles chronology
"Finer Feelings" (1992)	"What Kind of Fool (Heard All That Before)" (1992)	"Celebration" (1992)

Music video
- "What Kind of Fool" on YouTube

"What Kind of Fool (Heard All That Before)" is a song recorded by Australian recording artist Kylie Minogue, released as the lead single from her first greatest hits album Greatest Hits (1992). The song was written by Mike Stock, Minogue and Pete Waterman, and produced by Stock and Waterman.

"What Kind of Fool" was Minogue's last original song to be released through the record label PWL International. The single was released on 10 August 1992 across various formats and received positive reception from music critics, with many praising it as a good last single from PWL. The song peaked at numbers 17 and 14 in Australia and the United Kingdom, respectively.

== Background ==
The song was taken from Minogue's first compilation album Greatest Hits as the first single and last original single to be released by her label PWL, but her second single from the album, "Celebration", was taken as the last single. The song was written by Stock and Waterman, as well as Minogue contributing in the lyrics and was produced by Stock and Waterman.

== Critical reception ==
=== Initial response ===
The song received generally mixed reviews from music critics. Some compared it with "I Should Be So Lucky" and "Better the Devil You Know", but many suggested the song was regressive in comparison to Minogue's more mature work from the previous two years. A reviewer from Music Week commented, "Typically bright and breezy, it is however a little slight of melody and hooks when compared to some of her previous work – but that won't stop it from continuing her unbroken sequence of Top 20 hits." Ian McCann from New Musical Express wrote, "Kylie in bubbly, non-funky, standard home-grown PWL fare. Well-constructed as ever, but hardly "Step Back in Time", a monster that will surely dog her no matter what she does." Tom Doyle from Smash Hits gave "What Kind of Fool (Heard All That Before)" three out of five, calling it a "tweety dance anthem" and "infinitely better than most poppy house records".

=== Impact and legacy ===
In spite of these negative reviews, British magazine Classic Pop retrospectively ranked "What Kind of Fool (Heard All That Before)" number 25 in its list of "Top 40 Stock/Aitken/Waterman songs" in 2021, adding: "It has since fallen off the radar for most – even Kylie herself has admitted she is not a fan. However, we – and a horde of dedicated types – think it's a lost Kylie gem". The same magazine ranked the song at number 38 in its list of "Top 40 Kylie Minogue songs" in 2024, describing it as a "jubilant sample-happy penultimate PWL single" and noted its "exalted status amongst fanatics". In 2023, Robert Moran of Australian daily tabloid newspaper The Sydney Morning Herald ranked the song as Minogue's 114th best song (out of 183).

However, Minogue admitted in an interview with the Australian Sunday Telegraph in October 2008, that she was not fond of the song: "There's plenty I've cringed about", she says. "There's one track I really didn't like called 'What Kind of Fool'. But I realised you can run, but you can't hide, so I embraced 'I Should Be So Lucky' and the rest of them."

== Chart performance ==
"What Kind of Fool (Heard All That Before)" did not receive great commercial attention, although became a moderate hit in the UK and Australia where it debuted at number 37 (after five weeks it climbed and peaked at number 17). The song debuted at number 16 on the UK Singles Chart, later climbing to number 14 where it peaked, staying in the charts for five weeks. In addition, it debuted at number 22 on the Irish Singles Chart and fell off the charts after two weeks, peaked at number 36 in the Flanders region of Belgium and started at a peak of number 81 on the German chart edition of 12 October 1992 where it charted for four weeks.

== Music video ==
The accompanying music video for "What Kind of Fool" features Minogue sunbathing in front of a blanket, while a male actor is behind it with a rose. It later showed the male and Minogue having an argument in a bedroom. In the bridge, it shows Minogue in a blue plaid dress dancing under a spotlight. She later teases her lover and dances atop a table. The music video later ends with Minogue kissing him and she walks out the room, while the man sits on a chair left alone. The song's reception itself became one of Minogue's least successful singles to date. The single's video recreated scenes made famous by Brigitte Bardot in the 1956 film And God Created Woman. The song was featured on MTV Classics channel in 2011 and was listed at number thirty-four on Evolution of... Kylie Minogue.

== Track listings ==
- CD single
1. "What Kind of Fool (Heard All That Before)"
2. "What Kind of Fool (Heard All That Before)" [No Tech No Logical Remix]
3. "What Kind of Fool (Heard All That Before)" [Tech No Logical Remix]
4. "Things Can Only Get Better" [Original 7" Mix]
- 7-inch vinyl
1. "What Kind of Fool (Heard All That Before)"
2. "Things Can Only Get Better" [Original 7" Mix]
- 12-inch vinyl
1. "What Kind of Fool (Heard All That Before)" [No Tech No Logical Remix]
2. "What Kind of Fool (Heard All That Before)" [Tech No Logical Remix]
3. "Things Can Only Get Better" [Original 12" Mix]
- Cassette single
1. "What Kind of Fool (Heard All That Before)"
2. "Things Can Only Get Better" [Original 7" Mix]
- Digital EP (Released earlier with new mixes in 2009)
1. "What Kind of Fool (Heard All That Before)"
2. "What Kind of Fool (Heard All That Before)" [No Tech No Logical Remix]
3. "What Kind of Fool (Heard All That Before)" [Tech No Logical Remix]
4. "What Kind of Fool (Heard All That Before)" [12" Master Mix]
5. "What Kind of Fool (Heard All That Before)" [Instrumental]
6. "What Kind of Fool (Heard All That Before)" [Backing Track]
7. "Things Can Only Get Better" [Original 7" Mix]
8. "Things Can Only Get Better" [Original 12" Mix]
9. "Things Can Only Get Better" [Original Instrumental]
10. "Things Can Only Get Better" [Original Backing Track]

== Charts ==
Weekly chart performance for "What Kind of Fool (Heard All That Before)"
Chart (1992)	Peak position
Australia (ARIA)	17
Belgium (Ultratop 50 Flanders)	36
Europe (Eurochart Hot 100)	53
Germany (GfK)	81
Ireland (IRMA)	22
UK Singles (Official Charts)	14
UK Airplay (Music Week)	24

== Release history ==
Release dates and formats "What Kind of Fool (Heard All That Before)"
Region	Date	Format(s)	Label(s)	Ref.
United Kingdom	10 August 1992	7-inch vinyl; 12-inch vinyl; CD; cassette	PWL International	
Australia	14 September 1992	CD; cassette	Mushroom	
Japan	21 September 1992	CD	PWL	
Australia	12 October 1992	12-inch vinyl	Mushroom	
