= Greatest Hits (2002 Kylie Minogue album) =

2002 compilation album by Kylie Minogue

- Greatest Hits cover art

Greatest hits album / video by Kylie Minogue
- Released: 18 November 2002 (Greatest Hits); 21 October 2003 (Greatest Hits 87–97)
- Recorded: 1987–1992 (Greatest Hits); 1987–1997 (Greatest Hits 87–97)
- Genres: Pop; dance
- Length: 146:30
- Labels: PWL; Jive; BMG

Kylie Minogue chronology
| KylieFever2002 (2002) | Greatest Hits (2002) | Body Language (2003) |

Kylie Minogue video chronology
| KylieFever2002: Live in Manchester (2002) | Greatest Hits (2003) | Greatest Hits: 87–99 (2003) |

Alternative cover
- Greatest Hits 87–97 cover art

Alternative cover
- Vintage Kylie: The Hits 88–92 cover art

Greatest Hits (titled on the back cover as Greatest Hits 87–92 and re-titled as Vintage Kylie: The Hits 88–92) is a 2002 greatest hits album by Australian singer Kylie Minogue. Released on 18 November 2002 by PWL, the album collects work from Minogue's PWL period, including the albums Kylie (1988), Enjoy Yourself (1989), Rhythm of Love (1990), Let's Get to It (1991) and Greatest Hits (1992).

An updated version of the compilation called Greatest Hits 87–97 was later released on 24 November 2003 by BMG and PWL, distributed by Jive, due to her release of Body Language in early 2004. The cover sleeve for this version was shot by British photographer Simon Fowler in 1990, and includes songs and remixes from the albums Kylie Minogue (1994) and Impossible Princess (1997).

== Background ==
After the massive success of Minogue's eighth studio album Fever (2001), BMG decided to release a greatest hits album.

The 2002 album cover used a stock photo photographed by Jasper James, which depicts a supposed look-alike dressed in her underwear. AllMusic's Johnny Loftus called it "shoddy." The updated version of the compilation later used a picture from Minogue's photoshoot with Simon Fowler in 1990.

The release ruffled some feathers in the Minogue camp, in particular the cover artwork. An 'official' cover, designed by Minogue and her team was made available to download from her website and was also given away free inside copies of Heat magazine. Titled Vintage Kylie, the card insert bore the cheeky message "Like Kylie? Why not have the real thing!" A version of the compilation titled Best Of was also released in France, but withdrawn from sale on day of release.

Due to Minogue's release of her then-new album, Body Language, in February 2004, BMG re-released the compilation.

== Critical response ==
Greatest Hits

Greatest Hits
Review scores
| Source | Rating |
|---|---|
| AllMusic | 2/5 stars |
| Amazon.co.uk | (positive) |

Johnny Loftus from AllMusic gave the compilation two stars out of five. He suggested that there was nothing in the album that feels "very exclusive," with the remixes "readily available to aficionados in other, less after-market places." He also pointed readers to the 2003 version, calling it "a much better option for the casual listener." Writing for Amazon.co.uk, John Galilee compared Minogue's music to "fine wine", which "has aged gracefully over the years". He questioned the replacement of "It's No Secret" with the B-side track "Say the Word – I'll Be There" but concluded: "The collection adds weight to Kylie's early mentor Pete Waterman's assertion that Stock, Aitken and Waterman would one day be viewed as the 1980s equivalent of Motown. Who would have thought back in 1988 that "I Should Be So Lucky" and "Je Ne Sais Pas Pourquoi" would become such gems?"

Greatest Hits 87–97

Greatest Hits: 87–97
Review scores
| Source | Rating |
|---|---|
| AllMusic | 4.5/5 stars |
| Billboard | (favorable) |
| Rolling Stone | 4/5 stars |
| Rolling Stone Germany | 2/5 stars |

Chris True from AllMusic gave the compilation four stars out of five, praising it as a "valid and well-represented (yet oddly out of chronological order) anthology of what Americans were missing". He concluded the review by stating that "For those who were surprised by her sudden reappearance [with "Can't Get You Out of My Head", 13 years since Minogue's previous US hit "The Loco-Motion"], this will fill in the picture quite nicely, and for those who just couldn't get enough of Minogue upon hearing her for the first time in 2002, Greatest Hits 87-97 will surely satisfy."

== Commercial performance ==
In the UK Albums Chart, Greatest Hits debuted and peaked at number 20, spending a total of 13 weeks on the chart.

== Track listing ==
All songs written and produced by Mike Stock, Matt Aitken and Pete Waterman except where noted.

=== Greatest Hits ===
Disc one: The Singles
| No. | Title | Writer(s) | Producer(s) | Length |
|---|---|---|---|---|
| 1. | "I Should Be So Lucky" (from Kylie, 1988) | | | 3:24 |
| 2. | "The Loco-Motion" (7" mix, from Kylie, 1988) | Gerry Goffin; Carole King | | 3:14 |
| 3. | "Hand on Your Heart" (from Enjoy Yourself, 1989) | | | 3:51 |
| 4. | "Got to Be Certain" (from Kylie, 1988) | | | 3:20 |
| 5. | "Better the Devil You Know" (from Rhythm of Love, 1990) | | | 3:53 |
| 6. | "Wouldn't Change a Thing" (from Enjoy Yourself, 1989) | | | 3:14 |
| 7. | "Celebration" (from Greatest Hits, 1992) | Robert Bell; James Taylor | Phil Harding; Ian Curnow | 3:59 |
| 8. | "Never Too Late" (from Enjoy Yourself, 1989) | | | 3:22 |
| 9. | "What Do I Have to Do?" (7" mix, from Rhythm of Love, 1990) | | | 3:33 |
| 10. | "Je ne sais pas pourquoi" (from Kylie, 1988) | | | 4:01 |
| 11. | "Where in the World?" (from Greatest Hits, 1992) | Mike Stock; Pete Waterman; Kylie Minogue | Stock; Waterman | 3:31 |
| 12. | "Step Back in Time" (from Rhythm of Love, 1990) | | | 3:04 |
| 13. | "Especially for You" (with Jason Donovan, from Enjoy Yourself, 1989) | | | 4:00 |
| 14. | "Say the Word – I'll Be There" | Stock; Waterman; Minogue | Stock; Waterman | 4:10 |
| 15. | "Shocked" (DNA 7" mix featuring Jazzi P, from Rhythm of Love, 1990) | Stock; Matt Aitken; Waterman; Pauline Bennett | Stock Aitken Waterman; DNA | 3:08 |
| 16. | "Word Is Out" (from Let's Get to It, 1991) | Stock; Waterman | Stock; Waterman | 3:35 |
| 17. | "Made in Heaven" | | | 3:33 |
| 18. | "What Kind of Fool (Heard All That Before)" (from Greatest Hits, 1992) | Stock; Waterman; Minogue | Stock; Waterman | 3:44 |
| 19. | "Give Me Just a Little More Time" (from Let's Get to It, 1991) | Edyth Wayne; Ronald Dunbar | Stock; Waterman | 3:08 |
| 20. | "Finer Feelings" (Brothers in Rhythm 7" mix; from Let's Get to It, 1991) | Stock; Waterman | Stock; Waterman; Brothers in Rhythm | 3:49 |
| 21. | "If You Were with Me Now" (featuring Keith Washington, from Let's Get to It, 1991) | Stock; Waterman; Minogue; Keith Washington | Stock; Waterman | 3:12 |
| 22. | "Tears on My Pillow" (from Enjoy Yourself, 1989) | Sylvester Bradford; Al Lewis | | 2:29 |
| Total length: | | | | 77:14 |

Disc two: The Remixes
| No. | Title | Writer(s) | Producer(s) | Length |
|---|---|---|---|---|
| 1. | "Hand on Your Heart" (W.I.P. 2002 mix) | | Stock Aitken Waterman; Work in Progress | 6:06 |
| 2. | "I Should Be So Lucky" (extended mix) | | | 6:05 |
| 3. | "The Loco-Motion" (OZ tour mix) | Goffin; C. King | | 5:43 |
| 4. | "Made in Heaven" (Heaven Scent mix) | | | 4:45 |
| 5. | "Wouldn't Change a Thing" (the Espagna mix) | | Stock Aitken Waterman; Tony King | 5:51 |
| 6. | "Step Back in Time" (Harding Curnow remix) | | Stock Aitken Waterman; Harding; Curnow | 6:46 |
| 7. | "Shocked" (Harding Curnow mix) | | Stock Aitken Waterman; Harding; Curnow | 7:31 |
| 8. | "Word Is Out" (Summer Breeze mix) | Stock; Waterman | Stock; Waterman; T. King; Asha Elfenbien | 7:41 |
| 9. | "Celebration" (Techno Rave remix) | Bell; Taylor | Harding; Curnow; Barry Stone; Les Sharma | 6:43 |
| 10. | "Better the Devil You Know" (Movers & Shakers alternative 12" mix) | | Stock Aitken Waterman; Movers & Shakers | 6:28 |
| 11. | "What Do I Have to Do?" (Movers & Shakers 12" mix) | | Stock Aitken Waterman; Movers & Shakers | 8:49 |

=== Greatest Hits 87–97 ===
The Japan edition replaces "Je ne sais pas pourquoi" and "Made in Heaven" with "Turn It into Love" and "It's No Secret", and adds a previously unreleased instrumental version of "Turn It into Love" at the end of disc 2.

Disc one
| No. | Title | Writer(s) | Producer(s) | Length |
|---|---|---|---|---|
| 1. | "I Should Be So Lucky" (from Kylie, 1988) | | | 3:24 |
| 2. | "The Loco-Motion" (7" Mix, from Kylie, 1988) | Goffin; C. King | | 3:14 |
| 3. | "Hand on Your Heart" (from Enjoy Yourself, 1989) | | | 3:51 |
| 4. | "Got to Be Certain" (from Kylie, 1988) | | | 3:18 |
| 5. | "Better the Devil You Know" (from Rhythm of Love, 1990) | | | 3:54 |
| 6. | "Wouldn't Change a Thing" (from Enjoy Yourself, 1989) | | | 3:14 |
| 7. | "Celebration" (from Greatest Hits, 1992) | Bell; Taylor | Harding; Curnow | 3:57 |
| 8. | "Never Too Late" (from Enjoy Yourself, 1989) | | | 3:23 |
| 9. | "What Do I Have to Do?" (7" mix, from Rhythm of Love, 1990) | | | 3:33 |
| 10. | "Je ne sais pas pourquoi" (from Kylie, 1988) | | | 4:01 |
| 11. | "Where in the World?" (from Greatest Hits, 1992) | Stock; Waterman; Minogue | Stock; Waterman | 3:32 |
| 12. | "Step Back in Time" (from Rhythm of Love, 1990) | | | 3:05 |
| 13. | "Especially for You" (with Jason Donovan, from Enjoy Yourself, 1989) | | | 3:59 |
| 14. | "Say the Word – I'll Be There" | Stock; Waterman; Minogue | Stock; Waterman | 4:10 |
| 15. | "Shocked" (DNA 7" mix featuring Jazzi P, from Rhythm of Love, 1990) | Stock; Aitken; Waterman; Bennett | Stock Aitken Waterman; DNA | 3:10 |
| 16. | "Word Is Out" (from Let's Get to It, 1991) | Stock; Waterman | Stock; Waterman | 3:35 |
| 17. | "Made in Heaven" | | | 3:33 |
| 18. | "What Kind of Fool (Heard All That Before)" (from Greatest Hits, 1992) | Stock; Waterman; Minogue | Stock; Waterman | 3:43 |
| 19. | "Give Me Just a Little More Time" (from Let's Get to It, 1991) | Wayne; Dunbar | Stock; Waterman | 3:08 |
| 20. | "Finer Feelings" (Brothers in Rhythm 7" mix, from Let's Get to It, 1991) | Stock; Waterman | Stock; Waterman; Brothers in Rhythm | 3:48 |
| 21. | "If You Were with Me Now" (featuring Keith Washington, from Let's Get to It, 1991) | Stock; Waterman; Minogue; Washington | Stock; Waterman | 3:12 |
| 22. | "Tears on My Pillow" (from Enjoy Yourself, 1989) | Bradford; Lewis | | 2:29 |

Disc two
| No. | Title | Writer(s) | Producer(s) | Length |
|---|---|---|---|---|
| 1. | "Confide in Me" (radio edit, from Kylie Minogue, 1994) | Steve Anderson; Dave Seaman; Owain Barton | Brothers in Rhythm | 4:24 |
| 2. | "Put Yourself in My Place" (radio edit, from Kylie Minogue, 1994) | Jimmy Harry | Harry | 4:11 |
| 3. | "Did It Again" (radio edit, from Impossible Princess, 1997) | Minogue; Anderson; Seaman | Brothers in Rhythm | 3:47 |
| 4. | "Breathe" (radio edit, from Impossible Princess, 1997) | Minogue; Dave Ball; Ingo Vauk | Minogue; Ball; Vauk | 3:39 |
| 5. | "Hand on Your Heart" (W.I.P. 2002 mix) | | Stock Aitken Waterman; Work in Progress | 6:03 |
| 6. | "I Should Be So Lucky" (extended mix) | | | 6:05 |
| 7. | "The Loco-Motion" (OZ tour mix) | Goffin; C. King | | 5:40 |
| 8. | "Wouldn't Change a Thing" (the Espagna mix) | | Stock Aitken Waterman; T. King | 5:51 |
| 9. | "Step Back in Time" (Harding Curnow remix) | | Stock Aitken Waterman; Harding; Curnow | 6:46 |
| 10. | "Shocked" (Harding Curnow mix) | | Stock Aitken Waterman; Harding; Curnow | 7:31 |
| 11. | "Better the Devil You Know" (Movers & Shakers alternative 12" mix) | | Stock Aitken Waterman; Movers & Shakers | 6:28 |
| 12. | "What Do I Have to Do?" (Movers & Shakers 12" mix) | | Stock Aitken Waterman; Movers & Shakers | 8:49 |

== DVD track listing ==
=== Greatest Hits ===
| No. | Title | Director(s) | Length |
|---|---|---|---|
| 1. | "I Should Be So Lucky^{[a]}^{[b]}" | Chris Langman |
| 2. | "The Loco-Motion^{[a]}^{[b]}" | Langman |
| 3. | "Hand on Your Heart^{[a]}^{[b]}" | Langman |
| 4. | "Got to Be Certain^{[a]}^{[b]}" | Langman |
| 5. | "Better the Devil You Know^{[b]}" | Paul Goldman |
| 6. | "Wouldn't Change a Thing^{[b]}" | Pete Cornish |
| 7. | "Celebration" | Greg Masuak |
| 8. | "Never Too Late^{[b]}^{[c]}" | Cornish |
| 9. | "What Do I Have to Do?^{[b]}" | David Hogan |
| 10. | "Je ne sais pas pourquoi^{[b]}" | Langman |
| 11. | "Step Back in Time^{[b]}" | Nick Egan |
| 12. | "Especially for You" (with Jason Donovan) | Langman |
| 13. | "Shocked" | Hogan |
| 14. | "Word Is Out^{[a]}" | James Le Bon |
| 15. | "Made in Heaven" | Langman |
| 16. | "What Kind of Fool? (Heard All That Before)" | Masuak |
| 17. | "Give Me Just a Little More Time" | Masuak |
| 18. | "Finer Feelings" | Hogan |
| 19. | "If You Were With Me Now" (with Keith Washington) | Masuak |
| 20. | "Tears on My Pillow^{[b]}" | Cornish |
| 21. | "It's No Secret^{[b]}" (bonus video) | Langman |
| 22. | "Photo gallery" (BGM: Turn It into Love) |

=== Greatest Hits 87–97 ===
| No. | Title | Director(s) | Length |
|---|---|---|---|
| 21. | "Confide in Me" | Paul Boyd |
| 22. | "Put Yourself in My Place" | Keir McFarlane |
| 23. | "Did It Again" | Pedro Romhanyi |
| 24. | "Breathe" | Kieran Evans |
| 25. | "It's No Secret" (bonus video) | Langman |
| 26. | "Photo gallery" (BGM: Turn It into Love) |

=== Notes ===
- ^{^a} includes alternate versions.
- ^{^b} includes introductions and interviews.
- ^{^c} includes behind the scenes footage.

== Charts ==
=== Weekly charts ===
Greatest Hits

| Chart (2002–03) | Peak position |
|---|---|
| Scottish Albums (Official Charts) | 21 |
| UK Albums (Official Charts) | 20 |
| UK Independent Albums (Official Charts) | 1 |

Greatest Hits 87–97

| Chart (2003) | Peak position |
|---|---|
| Japanese Albums (Oricon) | 56 |

Greatest Hits (DVD version)

| Chart (2003) | Peak position |
|---|---|
| UK Albums (OCC) | 9 |

Greatest Hits 87–97 (DVD version)

| Chart (2002) | Peak position |
|---|---|
| Japanese Albums (Oricon) | 131 |

=== Year-end charts ===
Greatest Hits

| Chart (2002) | Position |
|---|---|
| UK Albums (OCC) | 73 |

== Certifications ==
Greatest Hits

| Region | Certification | Certified units/sales |
|---|---|---|
| United Kingdom (BPI) | Platinum | 300,000^{^} |
^{^} Shipments figures based on certification alone.

Greatest Hits (DVD version)

| Region | Certification | Certified units/sales |
|---|---|---|
| United Kingdom (BPI) | Gold | 25,000^{^} |
^{^} Shipments figures based on certification alone.
