= Sequal =

Sequal may refer to:

- SEQUAL framework, systems modelling reference model for evaluating the quality of models
- Sequal (group), American Latin freestyle female duo
  - Sequal (album), the group's only album, 1988

Sequal is also a common misspelling for sequel.

== See also ==
- Sequel (disambiguation)
- Sequals
