= Over You =

Over You may refer to:

- "Over You" (Anne Murray song), 1994
- "Over You" (Daughtry song), 2007
- "Over You" (Gary Puckett & The Union Gap song), 1968
- "Over You" (Girlicious song), 2010
- "Over You" (Lasgo song), 2009
- "Over You" (Miranda Lambert song), 2012
- "Over You" (Roxy Music song), 1980
- "Over You" (Safia song), 2016
- "Over You" (Tender Mercies song), from the film Tender Mercies, 1983
- "Over You", a song by Aaron Neville, 1960
- "Over You", a song by Almira Zaky which represented Virginia in the American Song Contest, 2022
- "Over You", a song by Bilal Hassani from Kingdom, 2019
- "Over You", a song by Daddy DJ, 2002
- "Over You", a song by Goo Goo Dolls from Miracle Pill, 2019
- "Over You", a song by Jelly Roll from Ballads of the Broken, 2021
- "Over You", a song by Justin from Finally, 1999
- "Over You", a song by Paul Revere & the Raiders, 1964
- "Over You", a song by Supertramp from Slow Motion, 2002
- "I'm Over Dreaming (Over You)", a song by Kylie Minogue from Enjoy Yourself, 1989

== See also ==
- I'm Over You (disambiguation)
