= Disco in Dream =

1989 concert tour by Kylie Minogue

- Tour by Kylie Minogue
- Promotional poster for the tour
- Location: Asia; Europe
- Associated albums: Kylie; Enjoy Yourself
- Start date: 2 October 1989
- End date: 27 October 1989
- Legs: 2
- No. of shows: 14

Kylie Minogue concert chronology
- Disco in Dream (1989); Enjoy Yourself Tour (1990)

Disco in Dream is the debut concert tour by Australian recording artist Kylie Minogue. Although headlined by Minogue, the tour was an ensemble show alongside fellow Stock Aitken Waterman acts Sinitta and Dead Or Alive and supported her first two studio albums, Kylie (1988) and Enjoy Yourself (1989). The tour took place in Asia, later travelling to Europe re-titled as 'The Coca-Cola Hitman Roadshow' with a different line up of PWL and Stock Aitken Waterman artists such as Big Fun and Sonia. The shows were free to "thank British fans for their support" and targeted towards fans under the age of 18.

It is likely that during the Disco in Dream tour, the relationship between Kylie and INXS lead singer Michael Hutchence began. Michael reportedly owned an apartment in Hong Kong and, following previous flirtations at industry events Michael successfully managed to seduce the singer. Kylie ended her relationship with Jason Donovan soon afterwards.

== Setlist ==
1. "The Loco-Motion"
2. "Got to Be Certain"
3. "Tears on My Pillow"
4. "Je Ne Sais Pas Pourquoi"
5. "Made in Heaven"
6. "Hand on Your Heart"
7. "Wouldn't Change a Thing"
8. "I Should Be So Lucky"

== Tour dates ==
List of 1989 concerts
Date (1989)	City	Country	Venue
2 October	Nagoya	Japan	Nagoya Rainbow Hall
6 October	Tokyo	Japan	Tokyo Dome
7 October	Osaka	Japan	Osaka-jō Hall
8 October	Osaka	Japan	Osaka-jō Hall
15 October	London	United Kingdom	Hammersmith Palais
16 October	Plymouth	United Kingdom	Ritzy Discothèque
17 October	Swansea	United Kingdom	Ritzy Discothèque
18 October	Manchester	United Kingdom	Manchester Apollo
19 October	Liverpool	United Kingdom	Liverpool Empire Theatre
22 October	Bristol	United Kingdom	Studio Nightclub
23 October	Newcastle	United Kingdom	Mayfair Ballroom
24 October	Sheffield	United Kingdom	The Roxy
25 October	Birmingham	United Kingdom	Ritzy Discothèque
27 October	Edinburgh	United Kingdom	Playhouse Theatre

== On the Go – Live in Japan ==
On the Go – Live in Japan
- DVD cover

Video by Kylie Minogue
- Released: 8 April 1990
- Length: 55:00
- Label: ALFA International; Video Collection International; Works Editora
- Director: Michael Baumohl, Roger Yager

Kylie Minogue chronology
The Videos 2 (1989)	''On the Go – Live in Japan'' (1990)	Let's Get To...The Videos (1991)

On the Go: Live in Japan is a video album by Australian singer Kylie Minogue. It was released by ALFA International and Video Collection International in Japan and in the UK on VHS and Laserdisc formats on 8 April 1990, and contains mixed footage from all concerts of the Disco in Dream concert tour, plus a documentary inserted between tracks.

=== Track listing ===
No.	Title	Length
1.	"Hand on Your Heart"
2.	"The Locomotion"
3.	"Made in Heaven"
4.	"Got To Be Certain"
5.	"Je Ne Sais Pas Pourquoi"
6.	"Wouldn't Change a Thing"
7.	"Tears on My Pillow"
8.	"I Should Be So Lucky"

== Personnel ==
- Kylie Minogue – executive producer
- Michael Baumohl – producer, director
- Roger Yader – producer, director
- Terry Blamey – co-producer
- Venol John – choreography
- Carol Minogue – costumes
