= I'm Over You =

I'm Over You may refer to:

- "I'm Over You" (Martine McCutcheon song), 2000
- "I'm Over You" (Sequal song), 1988
- "I'm Over You" (Keith Whitley song), 1990
- "I'm Over You", a Stan Rogers song, 1994

== See also ==
- Over You (disambiguation)
