= Summer 2019 =

2019–20 concert tour by Kylie Minogue

- Tour by Kylie Minogue
- Promotional poster for the tour
- Location: Europe; Asia; South America
- Associated album: Step Back in Time: The Definitive Collection
- Start date: 20 June 2019
- End date: 7 March 2020
- No. of shows: 17
- Supporting acts: Ana Matronic; Sophie Ellis-Bextor; Hackney Colliery Band; Nina Nesbitt; Sonic Yootha

Kylie Minogue concert chronology
- Golden Tour (2018–19); Summer 2019 (2019–20); More Than Just a Residency (2023–24)

Summer 2019 was the second festival tour by Australian recording artist Kylie Minogue, in support of her greatest hits album, Step Back in Time: The Definitive Collection (2019).

The tour commenced on 20 June 2019 in Kingston upon Thames, England at the Hampton Court Palace, and ended at the Latin American Memorial in São Paulo in 7 March 2020.

== Background ==
The tour was first announced on 12 November 2018, during the European leg of her Golden Tour, with Minogue posting a photo of the dates on her social media sites. Over the course of the following months, a further eight dates were added to the tour, including her performance at the 'legend slot' at Glastonbury Festival 2019.

== Critical reception ==
For the opening night of the tour in Hampton Court Palace, Thomas Hobbs from the Evening Standard gave the show four stars out of five, calling the show "the perfect warm-up for her Sunday evening legends slot", stating that Minogue was "unapologetically cheesy" but "so endearing". He also picked out the mashup of "Slow" and Bowie's "Fashion" as a highlight of the show.

Laura Snapes from The Guardian gave the Glastonbury show a five-star review, complimenting Minogue on managing a "seemingly impossible combination of sincerity and camp, pop perfection and pure emotion". She went on to applaud her set list and showmanship as "absolutely phenomenal" and concluded saying, "Never mind the legends slot; next stop, headliner." Dan Stubbs from NME praised the show for being "subtly subversive" and concluded that her Glastonbury debut was "worth the wait". Similarly, Anna Leszkiewicz from The Independent gave the show a positive review. Leszkiewicz praised that Minogue "has never been one to shy away from her brand of school disco pop", yet criticised that she sometimes "veered into self-parody" during the show. Minogue's performance was the most watched Glastonbury performance in history, peaking with 3.9 million viewers.

== Setlist ==
This set list is representative of the 23 June 2019 show in Blenheim. It does not represent all dates of the tour.

Act 1: Ka-Pow

1. "Love at First Sight"
2. "I Should Be So Lucky"
3. "On a Night Like This"
4. "Get Outta My Way"
5. "What Do I Have to Do"
6. "Never Too Late"

Act 2: Berlin Electro Love

7. "Je Ne Sais Pas Pourquoi"
8. "Hand on Your Heart"
9. "In Your Eyes"
10. "The One"'

Act 3: The Summer In Avalon

11. "Slow" (contains elements of "Fashion")
12. "Confide in Me" (The Abbey Road Sessions version)
13. "Kids"
14. "Can't Get You Out of My Head"

Act 4: The Wedding Disco

15. "Especially for You"
16. "Shocked"
17. "Step Back in Time"
18. "Better the Devil You Know"
19. "The Loco-Motion" (contains elements of "Bad Girls")
20. "All the Lovers"

Encore / The Final Stretch

21. "Dancing"
22. "Spinning Around"

=== Notes ===
- On opening night, "Spinning Around" was performed before "Dancing", but the songs were swapped thereafter.
- At the Glastonbury Festival show, "Get Outta My Way", "What Do I Have to Do", "Never Too Late", "In Your Eyes" and "The One" were not performed. Minogue performed "Where the Wild Roses Grow" with Nick Cave after "Hand on Your Heart", and was joined by Coldplay lead singer Chris Martin to perform "Can't Get You Out of My Head".
- At the Brighton Pride performance, Minogue added "Your Disco Needs You" replacing The Locomotion before "All the Lovers".
- At the Dubai concert Minogue added "Wow" to the setlist, replacing "I Should Be So Lucky", while "What Do I Have to Do", "Never Too Late" and "Je ne sais pas pourquoi" were also not performed. "Get Outta My Way" was moved to where "Je ne sais pas pourquoi" was originally performed in the set. "Especially for You" was also moved, being performed after "The Loco-Motion", with "Shocked" opening the fourth act instead. Additionally, the "Can't Get You Out Of My Head" performance was altered, with the acoustic version being dropped in favor of the original version.
- The São Paulo concert followed the same setlist as Dubai, with some specific changes. Minogue performed "In My Arms" right after "On A Night Like This", as a nod to the KylieX2008 show in the same city. Additionally, snippets of both "Your Disco Needs You" and "Come Into My World" were performed impromptu due to fans requesting them while "Especially for You" was dropped from the setlist.

== Shows ==
List of concerts
Date	City	Country	Venue	Opening act	Attendance	Revenue
20 June 2019 (Note: Two shows in 20 and 21 June in Kingston upon Thames, England were part of the Hampton Court Palace Festival concert series.)	Kingston upon Thames	England	Hampton Court Palace	—N/a	—N/a	—N/a
21 June 2019	Kingston upon Thames	England	Hampton Court Palace	—N/a	—N/a	—N/a
23 June 2019 (Note: The 23 June show in Blenheim, England at the Blenheim Palace was part of the Nocturne Live concert series.)	Blenheim	England	Blenheim Palace	Hackney Colliery Band; Sophie Ellis-Bextor	—N/a	—N/a
28 June 2019 (Note: The 28 June show in Werchter, Belgium was part of the Rock Werchter concert series.)	Werchter	Belgium	Werchter Festivalpark	—N/a		
30 June 2019 (Note: The 30 June show in Pilton, England at Worthy Farm was part of the Glastonbury Festival 2019 concert series.)	Pilton	England	Worthy Farm	—N/a	203,000	$308.99
2 July 2019 (Note: The 2 July show in St Austell, England at the Eden Project was part of the Eden Sessions 2019 concert series.)	St Austell	England	Eden Project	Nina Nesbitt	—N/a	—N/a
3 July 2019 (Note: The 3 July show in St Austell, England at the Eden Project was part of the Eden Sessions 2019 concert series.)	St Austell	England	Eden Project	Nina Nesbitt	—N/a	—N/a
5 July 2019 (Note: The 5 July show in Gdynia, Poland at Gdynia-Kosakowo Airport was part of the Open'er Festival concert series.)	Gdynia	Poland	Gdynia-Kosakowo Airport	—N/a	—N/a	—N/a
6 July 2019 (Note: The 6 July show in Barcelona, Spain at the Parc del Fòrum was part of the Festival Cruïlla concert series.)	Barcelona	Spain	Parc del Fòrum	—N/a	—N/a	—N/a
11 July 2019 (Note: The 11 July show in Manchester, England at the Castlefield Bowl was part of the Sounds of the City concert series.)	Manchester	England	Castlefield Bowl	Sonic Yootha	6,191	$510,700
12 July 2019 (Note: The 12 July show in Lytham St Annes, England at Proms Arena was part of the Lytham Festival concert series.)	Lytham St Annes	England	Proms Arena	Ana Matronic; Sophie Ellis-Bextor	—N/a	—N/a
14 July 2019 (Note: The 14 July show in Edinburgh, Scotland at Edinburgh Castle was part of the 2019 Castle Concert Series.)	Edinburgh	Scotland	Edinburgh Castle	Nina Nesbitt	16,906	$1,352,740
15 July 2019 (Note: The 15 July show in Edinburgh, Scotland at Edinburgh Castle was part of the 2019 Castle Concert Series.)	Edinburgh	Scotland	Edinburgh Castle	Nina Nesbitt	16,906	$1,352,740
1 August 2019	Scarborough	England	Scarborough Open Air Theatre	Ana Matronic	—N/a	—N/a
3 August 2019 (Note: The 3 August show in Brighton, England was part of Brighton and Hove Pride.)	Brighton	England	Preston Park	—N/a	—N/a	—N/a
7 December 2019 (Note: This show was part of the Dubai Rugby Sevens 2019)	Dubai	United Arab Emirates	The Sevens Stadium	—N/a	—N/a	—N/a
7 March 2020 (Note: This show is part of the GRLS! Festival)	São Paulo	Brazil	Latin America Memorial	—N/a	13,223	$849,933
Total					36,320	$2,713,373
