= Never Too Late (Kylie Minogue song) =

1989 single by Kylie Minogue

Single by Kylie Minogue

from the album Enjoy Yourself
- B-side: "Kylie's Smiley Mix"
- Released: 23 October 1989
- Studio: PWL (London, England)
- Length: 3:21
- Label: PWL
- Songwriters: Mike Stock; Matt Aitken; Pete Waterman
- Producer: Stock Aitken Waterman

Kylie Minogue singles chronology
"Wouldn't Change a Thing" (1989)	"Never Too Late" (1989)	"Tears on My Pillow" (1990)

Music video
- "Never Too Late" on YouTube

"Never Too Late" is a song written and produced by British production team Stock, Aitken and Waterman for Australian singer Kylie Minogue's second studio album, Enjoy Yourself (1989). Released on 23 October 1989, the song peaked at number four on the UK Singles Chart (her first not to reach the top three in that country), number one in Ireland, and number 14 in Australia. It was later rerecorded for Minogue's orchestral compilation album, The Abbey Road Sessions, in 2012.

== Background and release ==
Minogue allegedly wanted the album title track "Enjoy Yourself" to be released as the third single from that album, but Pete Waterman overruled her request and "Never Too Late" was released instead on 23 October 1989. Writer Mike Stock says he deliberately composed the song with "old fashioned" lyrical themes, imagining it the style of a 1920s number. Called "Kylie's Smiley Mix", the B-side is a continuous mix of her biggest hits from the Kylie album, and the 12-inch version includes these songs in sequence order: "I'll Still Be Loving You", "It's No Secret", "Je ne sais pas pourquoi", "Turn It into Love", "I Should Be So Lucky", "Got to Be Certain", and the whistle from the beginning of the 1988 mix of "The Loco-Motion". The 7-inch mix contains the above tracks omitting "I'll Still Be Loving You" and "It's No Secret". Remixer Tony King admitted to dissatisfaction with the initial mix, which was created under time pressure with limited resources.

== Critical reception ==
In 2023, Robert Moran of Australian daily tabloid newspaper The Sydney Morning Herald ranked "Never Too Late" as Minogue's 74th best song (out of 183), a song he described a "soaring disco number", adding "Not just a throwback, the energetic breakdown points to Kylie's burgeoning interest in Euro house".

== Chart performance ==
"Never Too Late" debuted at number 17 on the UK Singles Chart on the chart edition of 4 November 1989, then rose to its peak of number four the following week where it stayed for another week. It stayed on the chart for ten weeks, three of them spent in the top ten. The single's low debut broke Minogue's run of seven consecutive top-two hits, but it became her eighth consecutive top-five hit single and was certified silver by the British Phonographic Industry (BPI) for sales over 200,000. In Europe, the song reached the top ten in other three territories: it topped the chart out of a six-week chart run in Ireland, reached number two in Luxembourg and number four in the Flanders region of Belgium, charting for 13 weeks in the Ultratop 50. It peaked inside the top-20 in Spain where it missed the top ten by one place, and the Netherlands where it peaked at number 20 with ten weeks of charting, was a top-30 hit in Switzerland, France and Finland, and stalled at number 45 in West Germany where it counted 13 weeks on the chart. On the pan-European Hot 100 chart compiled by the Music & Media magazine, it peaked at number 11 in its third week.

In Oceanian nations, "Never Too Late" debuted at number 25 on the Australian Singles Chart, peaked two weeks later at number 14 and fell off the top 50 after ten weeks. It was less successful in New Zealand where it reached number 27 and charted for four weeks in the top 50.

== Music video ==
Directed by Pete Cornish, the video showed Minogue in various costumes with her dancers in front of various backdrops – some of the costumes are as a cowgirl, '70s disco, cheongsam with folding fans and as a 1920s flapper. The concept for the video was decided during a phone call between Minogue and Cornish, who both confessed they initially had no ideas about what to do next, before brainstorming the toy theatre concept. It was awarded the Logie for the "Most Popular Music Video" at the 32nd Annual TV week Logie Awards held in 1990 in Australia.

== Live performances ==
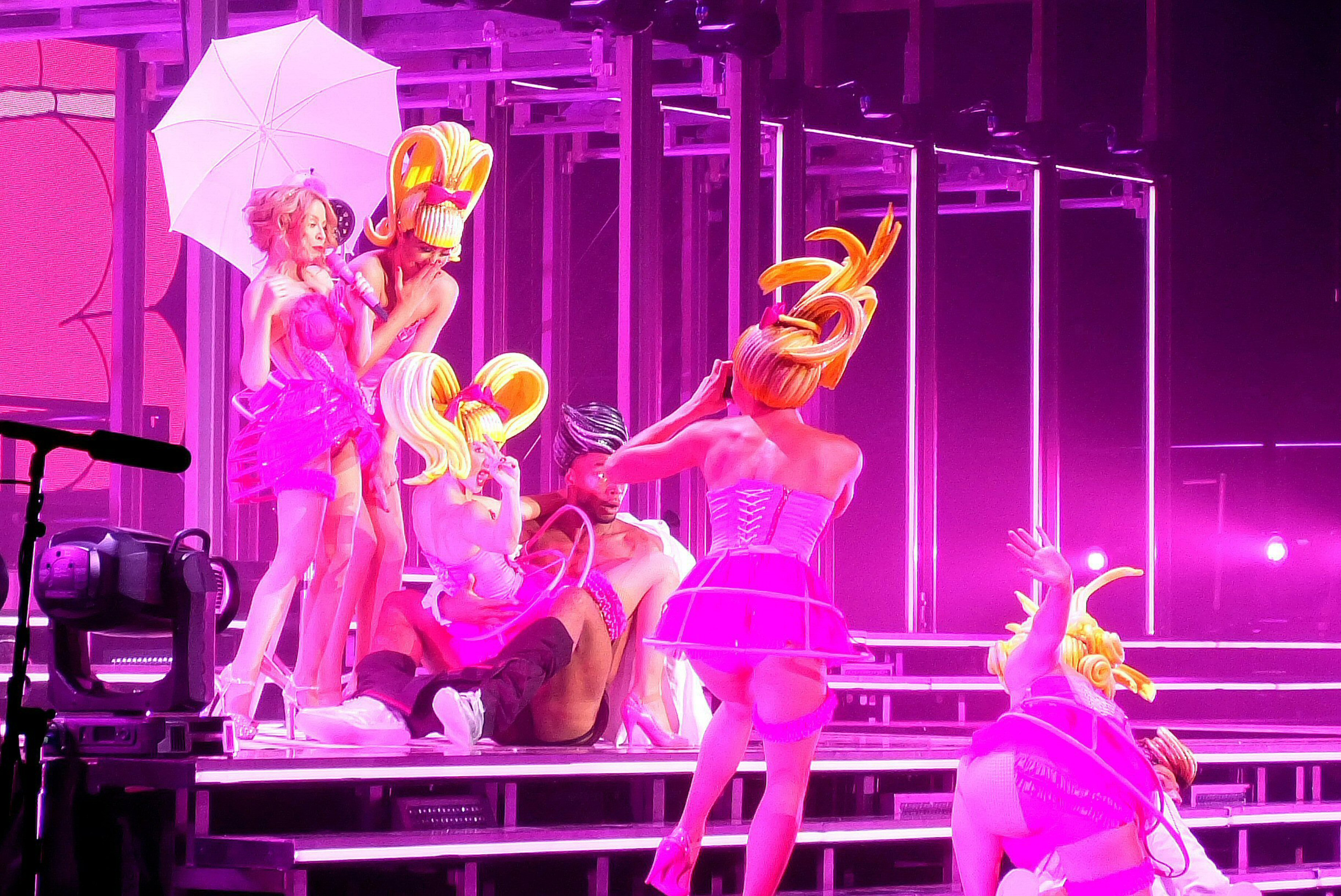
Minogue performing a medley of "Hand on Your Heart" and "Never Too Late", during her Kiss Me Once Tour (2014)

Since its release, "Never Too Late" has only been performed on four of Minogue's tours. Its first appearance was in the Enjoy Yourself Tour. It featured a small dance before hand and then the original. Its next performance was not for 11 years when Minogue performed it on her On a Night Like This Tour in 2001, which was launched to promote Light Years. It was performed as part of "Hits Medley" which featured 5 songs from her PWL days: "Step Back in Time", "Never Too Late", "Wouldn't Change a Thing", "Turn It into Love" and "Celebration" respectively. It was then set to be part of her KylieFever2002 set list as a space age version to feature as the opening to the act entitled "Cybertronica", but was removed at the last minute. It made an appearance on Minogue's Kiss Me Once Tour in 2014. It featured in the "Dollshouse Medley" which featured four songs from her PWL days: "Hand on Your Heart", "Never Too Late", "Got to Be Certain" and "I Should Be So Lucky" respectively. In this segment of the show, Minogue began in a pink shawl and took a layer off at the beginning of each song, before ending in a corset and knickers to sing "I Should Be So Lucky" in a bath, alluding to a scene in the song's music video. More recently, it is performed on her Summer 2019 Tour.

== Track listings ==
CD single

1. "Never Too Late" – 3:21
2. "Never Too Late" (extended) – 6:11
3. "Kylie's Smiley Mix" (extended) – 6:17

7-inch single

1. "Never Too Late" – 3:21
2. "Kylie's Smiley Mix" (7-inch version) – 3:59

12-inch single

1. "Never Too Late" (extended) – 6:11
2. "Kylie's Smiley Mix" (extended) – 6:17

Australian 7-inch single

1. "Never Too Late" – 3:21
2. "Made in Heaven" (Heaven Scent Mix) – 4:43

Australian 12-inch and cassette single

1. "Never Too Late" (extended) – 6:11
2. "Made in Heaven" (Heaven Scent Mix) – 4:43

== Charts ==
=== Weekly charts ===
Chart (1989)	Peak position
Australia (ARIA)	14
Belgium (Ultratop 50 Flanders)	4
Europe (European Hot 100 Singles)	11
Finland (Suomen virallinen lista)	27
France (SNEP)	26
Ireland (IRMA)	1
Luxembourg (Radio Luxembourg)	2
Netherlands (Dutch Top 40)	29
Netherlands (Single Top 100)	20
New Zealand (Recorded Music NZ)	27
Spain (AFYVE)	11
Switzerland (Schweizer Hitparade)	23
UK Singles (Official Charts)	4
UK Dance (Music Week)	23
West Germany (GfK)	45

=== Year-end charts ===
Chart (1989)	Position
Belgium (Ultratop 50 Flanders)	88
UK Singles (OCC)	74

== Certifications ==
Region	Certification	Certified units/sales
United Kingdom (BPI)	Silver	200,000^{^}
^{^} Shipments figures based on certification alone.
