= Wouldn't Change a Thing (Kylie Minogue song) =

1989 single by Kylie Minogue

- Artwork for Australian and New Zealand single

Single by Kylie Minogue

from the album Enjoy Yourself
- B-side: "It's No Secret"
- Released: 24 July 1989
- Studio: PWL (London, England)
- Genre: Dance-pop; teen pop
- Length: 3:14
- Label: PWL; Mushroom; Geffen
- Songwriters: Mike Stock; Matt Aitken; Pete Waterman
- Producer: Stock Aitken Waterman

Kylie Minogue singles chronology
"Hand on Your Heart" (1989)	"Wouldn't Change a Thing" (1989)	"Never Too Late" (1989)

Music video
- "Wouldn't Change a Thing" on YouTube

"Wouldn't Change a Thing" is a song performed by Australian singer-songwriter Kylie Minogue, recorded for her second studio album Enjoy Yourself (1989). The song was written by Stock Aitken Waterman, and was released on 24 July 1989 by Mushroom and PWL Records. The song was released as the second single off the album.

Musically, "Wouldn't Change a Thing" is like Minogue's previous singles, which is dance-pop related, with instruments including guitars, drum machine and tambourine effects. Commercially, the song received success on the charts, peaking in the top 20 in countries including Australia, Denmark, Finland, France and the United Kingdom, while just missing the top twenty in New Zealand.

Minogue has performed the song in most of her tours including Disco in Dream/The Hitman Roadshow, Enjoy Yourself Tour, Rhythm of Love Tour, Let's Get to It Tour, and Golden Tour. She also performed the song on a TV special entitled An Audience with Kylie (2001).

== Background ==
"Wouldn't Change a Thing" was Minogue's second single from her second studio album Enjoy Yourself (1989). In the UK, the B-side was "It's No Secret", which was released as a single in North America, Japan, Australia and New Zealand in 1988. It was intended to be the fifth worldwide single release from the debut album Kylie but was cancelled in favour of "Hand on Your Heart" and therefore was released as the B-side to "Wouldn't Change a Thing". The song was released in the United States. This single was heavily promoted on UK TV while Kylie was recording her 2nd album Enjoy Yourself shortly after completing work on her first feature film The Delinquents.

== Critical reception ==
Jason Shawahn from About.com said that the song, along with "Better the Devil You Know" and "What Do I Have to Do", "are nothing if not pop masterpieces." Bill Coleman from Billboard described it as "a delicate dance/pop ditty". He added, "Take note of the pumpin' 12-inch mixes." By contrast, Phil Cheeseman of Record Mirror considered the song an "utterly vacuous and predictable record". Retrospectively, in 2019, James Masterton described it a "fondly remembered second single" and a "breezy summertime pop song and one which once more conjured up the same memories of early 70s soul as "Especially for You"", and added it that was "so effortlessly charming even the most cynical of reviewers struggled to find anything negative to say about it". In 2023, Robert Moran of Australian daily tabloid newspaper The Sydney Morning Herald ranked the song as Minogue's 77th best song (out of 183), adding, "You've gotta love an '80s pop song that overuses the hip-hop stutter effect: "Ah-ah-ah-I wouldn't change a thing!" The chorus, both uplifting and naive, is deceptively catchy".

== Chart performance ==
Commercially, "Wouldn't Change a Thing" received quite modest success, but nevertheless had good peaks. The song debuted at number ten in Minogue's home country Australia, staying there for two weeks. The song then rose to number six for one week, and stayed in the charts for eight weeks. In New Zealand, the song debuted at number thirty-four, until the next week it rose to number twenty-one peaking there, missing the top twenty. It stayed in the charts for five weeks. In the United Kingdom, the song debuted at number two, staying there for two consecutive weeks, being held off the top spot by Jive Bunny and the Mastermixers's song "Swing The Mood". It descended the way out, and stayed on the charts for nine weeks. The song debuted at number forty-four on the French Singles Chart, until rising to number 19 peaking there. It stayed in the charts for nine weeks. The song debuted at number ninety-seven on the Dutch Top 40, until rising to number forty-three, peaking there for two consecutive weeks. The song spent a total of seven weeks there. The song debuted at number twenty-seven on the Swiss Singles Chart, until falling out. The song then re-entered at number twenty-eight, until it fell out the next week. The single sold 370,000 in UK. In the US, the song peaked at number 83 on the US Cashbox Pop Singles chart in February 1990, following its 12 January 1990, release to US radio.

== Music video ==
The accompanying music video for "Wouldn't Change a Thing" was Kylie's first video not shot in Australia, with filming taking place in London. With a tight filming deadline, the video was styled at the last minute, using mostly Kylie and her dancers' own wardrobes, with tuxedos hired from a wedding hire shop. Kylie wears cut off jeans and a black chiffon shirt knotted at the middle and evening wear, a bustier and skirt made out of pearls, her dancers in, alternately, top-hat-and-tails and street wear. The clip shows Kylie playfully enjoying herself in a garden in London, which belonged to PWL executive David Howells. These sequences were intercut with studio shots of her performing the routine both casual and formal. Some of the handheld camera sequences were filmed by Jason Donovan.

== Track listings ==
7-inch and cassette single

1. "Wouldn't Change a Thing" – 3:13
2. "It's No Secret" – 3:57

12-inch single

A1. "Wouldn't Change a Thing" (Your Thang Mix) – 7:10
B1. "It's No Secret" (extended) – 5:46
B2. "Wouldn't Change a Thing" (instrumental) – 3:13

Australian CD single

1. "Wouldn't Change a Thing" (Your Thang Mix)
2. "Wouldn't Change a Thing"
3. "Turn It into Love"

UK CD single

1. "Wouldn't Change a Thing"
2. "Wouldn't Change a Thing" (Your Thang Mix)
3. "Je ne sais pas pourquoi" (Revolutionary Mix)

US and Canadian 12-inch single

A1. "Wouldn't Change a Thing" (The Espagna Mix) – 5:44
A2. "Wouldn't Change a Thing" (Your Thang Mix) – 7:10
B1. "It's No Secret" (extended) – 5:31
B2. "Wouldn't Change a Thing" (instrumental) – 3:20

Japanese 7-inch and mini-CD single

1. "Wouldn't Change a Thing" (single version) – 3:12
2. "Wouldn't Change a Thing" (instrumental) – 3:20

Japanese mini maxi-CD single

1. "Wouldn't Change a Thing" (Your Thang Mix)
2. "Wouldn't Change a Thing" (single version)
3. "Wouldn't Change a Thing" (instrumental)

== Charts ==
=== Weekly charts ===
Chart (1989)	Peak position
Australia (ARIA)	6
Belgium (Ultratop 50 Flanders)	5
Denmark (IFPI)	4
Europe (European Hot 100 Singles)	11
Finland (Suomen virallinen lista)	6
France (SNEP)	19
Luxembourg (Radio Luxembourg)	1
Netherlands (Single Top 100)	43
New Zealand (Recorded Music NZ)	21
Spain (AFYVE)	19
Switzerland (Schweizer Hitparade)	27
UK Singles (Official Charts)	2
UK Dance (Music Week)	7
US Cash Box Top 100	83
West Germany (GfK)	24

=== Year-end charts ===
Chart (1989)	Position
Australia (ARIA)	99
Belgium (Ultratop)	54
Europe (European Hot 100 Singles)	75
UK Singles (OCC)	21

== Certification and sales ==
Region	Certification	Certified units/sales
Australia (ARIA)	Gold	35,000^{^}
United Kingdom	—	370,000
^{^} Shipments figures based on certification alone.
