= Sequel (disambiguation) =

A sequel is a work of fiction produced after a completed work, and set in the same "universe" but at a later time.

Sequel may also refer to:

- Sequel, a unit of transition that links two scenes, see scene and sequel
- Chevrolet Sequel, the hydrogen fuel car
- SEQUEL, the Structured English QUEry Language, a predecessor of SQL
- Sequel (album), 1980 album by Harry Chapin, as well as its title track
- Sequel Records, a record label
- Sequal (album), 1988 freestyle music group or eponymous album
- SQL (Structured Query Language), which is commonly pronounced as "sequel"
- "Sequel" (Space Ghost Coast to Coast), a television episode
- The street name of Seroquel, an antipsychotic medication

== See also ==
- Prequel, a literary, dramatic, or cinematic work whose story precedes that of a previous work
- Sequela, a pathological condition (or conditions, sequelae) that follows an earlier medical condition.
