= I'm Over You (Sequal song) =

Single by Sequal

from the album Sequal
- Released: 1988
- Genre: Dance-pop, freestyle
- Length: 4:43 (album version)
- Label: Capitol
- Songwriter(s): Miguel Morejon; Angie Vollaro
- Producer(s): Michael Morejon

Sequal singles chronology
"Stand By" (1986)	"I'm Over You" (1988)	"Tell Him I Called" (1988)

"I'm Over You" is a song by the group Sequal from their 1988 debut album Sequal.

== Track listing ==
US 12" single

No.	Title	Length
1.	"I'm Over You" (Maxi-Miamix-Mix)	6:13
2.	"I'm Over You" (Dubbed Over You)	5:38
3.	"I'm Over You" (Hot Edit)	4:25
4.	"I'm Over You" (Newk Yor Mix)	7:15
5.	"I'm Over You" (Freestyle Suite)	7:21
6.	"I'm Over You" (Power Edit)	4:56

== Charts ==
Chart (1988)	Peak Position
U.S. Billboard Hot Dance Music/Club Play	11
U.S. Billboard Hot Dance Music/Maxi-Singles Sales	21
