= Hand on Your Heart =

1989 single by Kylie Minogue

Single by Kylie Minogue

from the album Enjoy Yourself
- B-side: "Just Wanna Love You"
- Released: 24 April 1989
- Studio: PWL (London)
- Genre: Dance-pop
- Length: 3:47
- Label: Mushroom; PWL
- Songwriters: Mike Stock; Matt Aitken; Pete Waterman
- Producer: Stock Aitken Waterman

Kylie Minogue singles chronology
"Turn It into Love" (1988)	"Hand on Your Heart" (1989)	"Wouldn't Change a Thing" (1989)

Music video
- "Hand on Your Heart" on YouTube

"Hand on Your Heart" is a song by Australian singer Kylie Minogue from her second studio album, Enjoy Yourself (1989), and released as its lead single on 24 April 1989. Much like her previous releases up to Let's Get to It (1991), the song was written and produced by English songwriting and record production trio Stock Aitken Waterman (SAW). Referenced tracks during composition included "This Old Heart of Mine" by the Isley Brothers and "That's the Way Love Is" by Ten City.

Upon release, "Hand on Your Heart" received generally positive reviews from music critics, who deemed it a highlight from the album and praised it as a strong single. It was also a commercial success, peaking at number four in Australia and within the top-ten in Finland, France, Japan and Switzerland. "Hand on Your Heart" became Minogue's third number-one hit on the UK Singles Chart.

The song was performed on some tours by Minogue, including it on her Enjoy Yourself Tour, Rhythm of Love Tour, and was featured on her Showgirl: The Greatest Hits Tour and the Homecoming Tour. In 2006, Swedish singer José González released an acoustic cover version of "Hand on Your Heart" as a single. His version peaked at number 29 on the UK Singles Chart.

== Composition ==
Written in the key of B-flat major, SAW approached composition of "Hand on Your Heart" with excitement and enthusiasm following the success of Kylie. In turn, they were keen to move Minogue's sound along in accordance with the latest house-influenced pop sounds. The song centers around themes of honesty and communication in a relationship. The song is sung in the viewpoint of a girl whose boyfriend is trying to break up with her yet she does not believe their relationship is over; she insists that he puts his hand on his heart and tells her until he really means it.

Minogue re-recorded the song for her 2012 album The Abbey Road Sessions, reworking the song to feature brushed drums and gentle piano which magnify the heartbreak and make the lyrics such as “Oh, I wanna hear you tell me / You don't want my love” sound pleading, not defiant.

== Critical reception ==
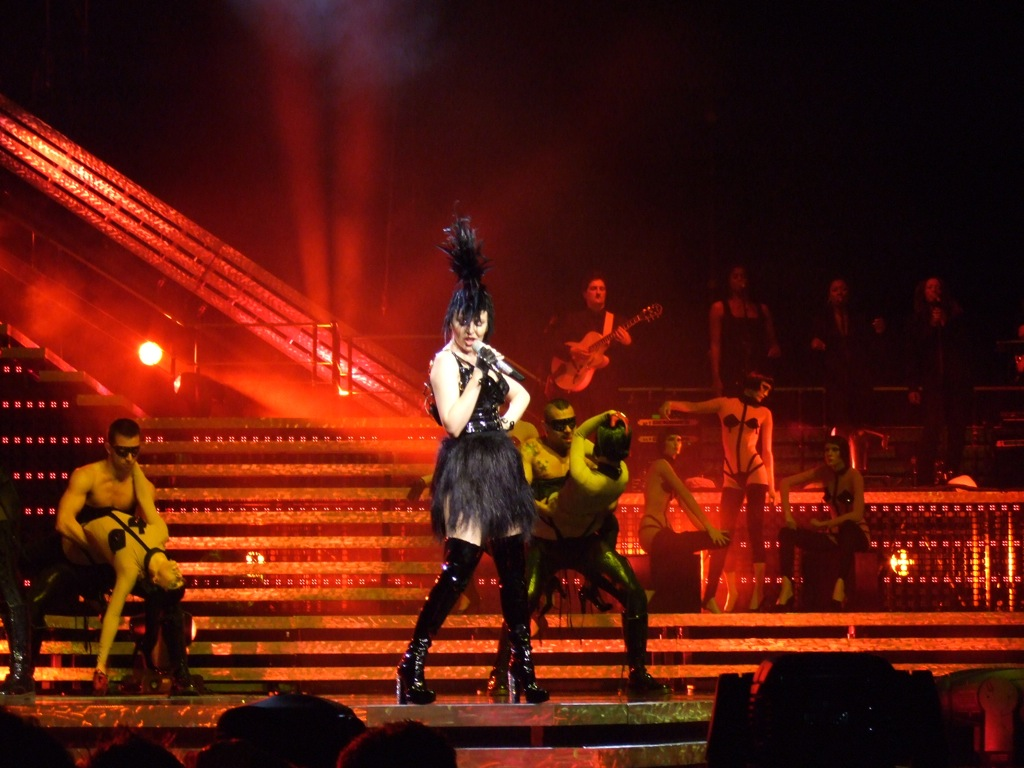
Minogue performing the song during her Showgirl: The Homecoming Tour (2006)

=== Initial response ===
"Hand on Your Heart" received generally favourable reviews from music critics. Chris True from AllMusic highlighted the song as an album standout. Digital Spy gave it a favourable review, highlighting it by saying "Put it this way... this piece is a wee bit late because it's hard to type while re-enacting the 'Hand On Your Heart' dance routine." However, Tim Nicholson of Record Mirror ironically explained that SAW "have let Kylie loose on some Sinitta's material to show her how it should be done", which he considered a "confectionery perfection".

The Abbey Road Sessions version was acclaimed by contemporary music commentators, who praised the instrumentation and Minogue's hushed vocals. Tim Sendra from AllMusic said that "Stripping the songs down to their basics and then adding strings on top proves to be very effective, especially on "All the Lovers" or "Hand on Your Heart," and most of the new arrangements are imaginative and sometime inspired." Nick Levine from BBC Music was very positive towards the reworked version of the song, writing that "Who knew Stock Aitken Waterman tunes like [Never Too Late] and [Hand On Your Heart] had such melancholy lurking under the production chintz?" Andy Gill wrote that "Hand on Your Heart", "reworked with a delicate, cyclical guitar figure augmented by a few telling piano chords, laid over a quietly shuffling snare whose gently scudding momentum allows the melody to glow at the heart of the song."

=== Impact and legacy ===
Retrospectively, in 2019, James Masterton described it a "bright, breezy" and "edgier, more credible club track" than her previous songs, adding that "the beats were dirtier, and the melody propelled by a house music piano rhythm". In 2020, Alexis Petridis of British daily newspaper The Guardian ranked the song at number 22 in his "Kylie's 30 greatest singles" list, adding that "the song itself – most notably the bridge and chorus – is strong enough to withstand the identikit production job". In 2021, British magazine Classic Pop ranked the song number 18 in their list of 'Top 40 Stock Aitken Waterman songs', adding that "this track's apparent starry-eyed innocence... houses at its heart lyrics that are utterly crushing when read out loud". In 2024, the same magazine ranked the song at number 22 in its list of "Top 40 Kylie Minogue songs", describing it as a "triumphant SAW-penned gem". In 2023, Robert Moran of Australian daily tabloid newspaper The Sydney Morning Herald ranked the song as Minogue's 18th best song (out of 183), describing it "a near-perfect marriage of forlorn heartbreak, extremely peppy production and a typically huge singalong chorus".

== Chart performance ==
On 24 April 1989, "Hand on Your Heart" was released in the United Kingdom. The song became Minogue's third song to debut at number two on the UK Singles Chart, before it peaked at number one the following week. On its third week it was replaced on the top of the chart by the UK Hillsborough disaster charity single "Ferry Cross the Mersey" by the Christians, Holly Johnson, Paul McCartney, Gerry Marsden and Stock, Aitken and Waterman. "Hand on Your Heart" also topped the UK Dance and Indie charts.

The song was one of the first singles to sell well on cassette, selling 11,000 copies in the first week of release. This would have been enough to have Minogue enter in at number one, something no female had ever done at the time. However, PWL issued the cassette single at a cut price of £1.99, which was cheaper than chart regulations at the time allowed. This meant the Bangles stayed at number one with "Eternal Flame", with around 1,600 more sales. Because of this the rules were quickly changed so that cut-price cassette singles were allowed. The market for cassette singles stood at less than 0.5% at the time and the BPI hoped to encourage its growth. Outside of the UK, the song was also successful. It reached number four in Australia and became Minogue's fifth top-five single on the singles chart. It reached the top 10 in Denmark, Finland and France and the top 20 in Germany, the Netherlands, New Zealand and Sweden.

== Music video ==
"Hand on Your Heart" was accompanied with colorful music video directed by Chris Langman and shot at Minogue's hometown in Melbourne in March 1989. The video features Minogue dancing in a modern house. She appears wearing a dress with a big heart on it that changes colour between vibrant colours of red, blue and yellow, Minogue travels from room to room, dancing playfully for the camera. Langman admitted to dissatisfaction with the finished video, which was produced under unusually tight deadlines. According to Minogue's then boyfriend and label mate Jason Donovan, PWL Records was highly displeased with the video. It was Langman's final collaboration with Kylie, who filmed most of her subsequent videos in the UK.

A live version of the video was also released and featured Minogue performing a special "live remix" in Japan, both versions featured on Kylie's Greatest Hits 87-97 DVD. An alternate version of the "Hand on Your Heart" video was broadcast on UK TV pre-release, but has never been screened again. On this version Minogue's shoes spin on camera and introduce all three of her new outfits of matching colours. Only one "shoe spin" remains on the final version. Released to music video channels prior to the single's commercial release, the video was a hit, gaining significant airplay on music video channels. The video was released commercially on the Ultimate Kylie companion DVD, released in December 2004.

== Live performances ==
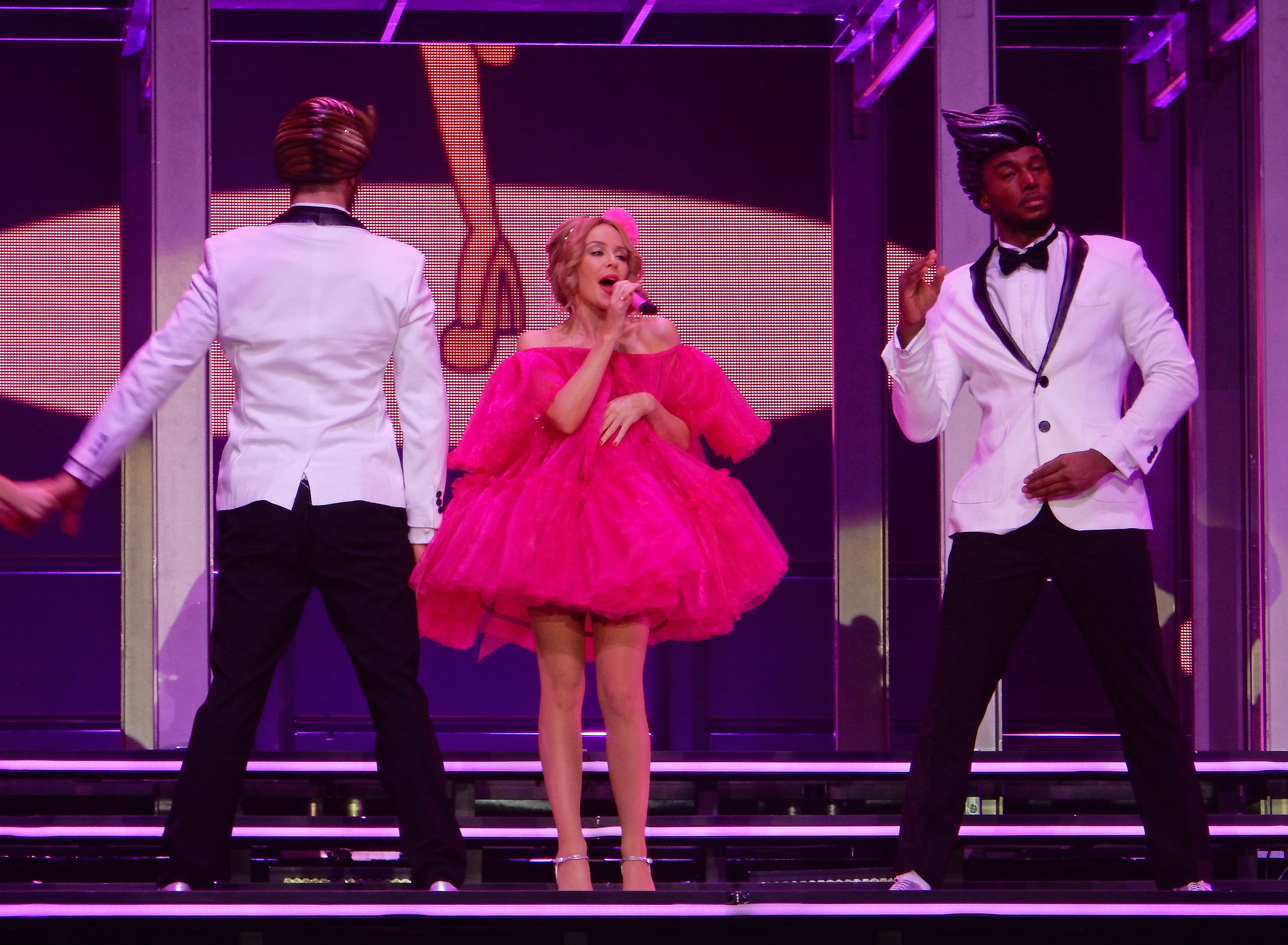
The performance of "Hand on Your Heart" during the "Dollhouse Medley" of Minogue's 2014 Kiss Me Once Tour

The first tour that "Hand on Your Heart" was performed on was the Disco in Dream/The Hitman Roadshow, as the original recording. It was then performed on the Enjoy Yourself Tour, which was launched to promote Enjoy Yourself, the album from which the song is lifted. It began with an a cappella chorus intro before the original was performed. It was then performed the following year on the Rhythm of Love Tour as the original again. It was performed on the Let's Get to It Tour the year after as the normal version again. The song was then not performed until Minogue's 2000 tour: On a Night Like This Tour as the third song in the set. This version was not similar to the original and had a different sound.

It was then performed on Minogue's Showgirl: The Greatest Hits Tour in 2005 where it opened the sixth act: "Kylesque". It had a similar sound to the original but had different bass lines. This tour was cancelled due to Minogue's diagnosis of breast cancer. The tour was resumed under the name Showgirl: The Homecoming Tour. "Hand on Your Heart" was also in this set list in the sixth act "Pop Paradiso", but closed this act. This was a new remix featuring a thicker bass line. More recently, the song was performed on Minogue's Kiss Me Once Tour to promote her twelfth studio album Kiss Me Once. It opened the "Dollhouse Medley" which featured 4 PWL hits: "Hand on Your Heart", "Never Too Late", "Got to Be Certain" and "I Should Be So Lucky".

== Track listing and formats ==
7-inch single and Australian cassette single

1. "Hand on Your Heart" – 3:47
2. "Just Wanna Love You" – 3:30

12-inch single

1. "Hand on Your Heart" (The Great Aorta Mix) – 6:26
2. "Just Wanna Love You" – 3:30
3. "Hand on Your Heart" (dub) – 5:30

Australasian CD single

1. "Hand on Your Heart" (7-inch version)
2. "Hand on Your Heart" (The Great Aorta Mix)
3. "Just Wanna Love You"
4. "It's No Secret"

UK CD single

1. "Hand on Your Heart" (The Great Aorta Mix) – 6:26
2. "Just Wanna Love You" – 3:30
3. "It's No Secret" – 5:30

UK cassette single

1. "Hand on Your Heart"
2. "Just Wanna Love You"
3. "Hand on Your Heart" (The Great Aorta Mix)

iTunes digital bundle (2009)

1. "Hand on Your Heart" (original) – 3:50
2. "Hand on Your Heart" (The Great Aorta Mix) – 6:24
3. "Hand on Your Heart" (dub) – 5:32
4. "Hand on Your Heart" (video mix) – 3:44
5. "Hand on Your Heart" (7-inch instrumental) – 3:50
6. "Hand on Your Heart" (7-inch backing track) – 3:50
7. "Just Wanna Love You" (original) – 3:31
8. "Just Wanna Love You" (instrumental) – 3:31
9. "Just Wanna Love You" (backing track) – 3:31

iTunes remix digital bundle (2009)

1. "Hand on Your Heart" (The Heartache Remix) – 5:21
2. "Hand on Your Heart" (Smokin' Remix) – 5:32
3. "Hand on Your Heart" (WIP 2002 remix) – 6:03
4. "Hand on Your Heart" (WIP 2002 instrumental) – 6:03
5. "Hand on Your Heart" (WIP 2002 backing track) – 6:03
6. "Hand on Your Heart" (WIP 2002 radio) – 3:23
7. "Hand on Your Heart" (WIP 2002 radio instrumental) – 3:23
8. "Hand on Your Heart" (WIP 2002 radio backing track) – 3:23

== Charts ==
=== Weekly charts ===
Weekly chart performance for "Hand on Your Heart"
Chart (1989)	Peak position
Australia (ARIA)	4
Belgium (Ultratop 50 Flanders)	6
Denmark (IFPI)	4
Europe (European Hot 100 Singles)	3
Finland (Suomen virallinen lista)	2
France (SNEP)	8
Japan (Oricon Singles Chart)	88
Greece (IFPI)	2
Ireland (IRMA)	1
Luxembourg (Radio Luxembourg)	1
Netherlands (Single Top 100)	17
Netherlands (Dutch Top 40)	19
New Zealand (Recorded Music NZ)	15
Norway (VG-lista)	10
Spain (AFYVE)	6
Sweden (Sverigetopplistan)	17
Switzerland (Schweizer Hitparade)	6
UK Singles (Official Charts)	1
UK Dance (Music Week)	1
West Germany (GfK)	17

=== Year-end charts ===
Year-end chart performance for "Hand on Your Heart"
Chart (1989)	Position
Australia (ARIA)	49
Belgium (Ultratop)	45
Europe (European Hot 100 Singles)	41
UK Singles (OCC)	10
West Germany (Media Control)	92

== Certifications and sales ==
Certifications and sales for "Hand on Your Heart"
Region	Certification	Certified units/sales
Australia (ARIA)	Gold	35,000^{^}
Japan	—	9,000
Malaysia	—	5,000
United Kingdom (BPI)	Gold	480,000
^{^} Shipments figures based on certification alone.
