= Sequal (group) =

Sequal was an American Latin freestyle female duo from Miami, composed of Angie Vollaro and Maria Christensen. The duo was founded in 1984 by producer Lewis A. Martineé. The name-sake Sequal, was to be the follow-up band to the immense popularity set forth by his first incarnation known as the group Exposé.

== Career ==
The group's first releases in 1985–86; "It's Not Too Late", "Stand By" and "She Don't Want You", were on Jose Armada Jr.'s primary independent label Joey Boy Records in Miami and became club smash hits.

In 1988, with the success of their club hits, the group was signed with major label Capitol/EMI Records, releasing its only self-titled album, which had a plethora of producers, including British hitmakers Stock Aitken Waterman (SAW) for "Tell Him I Called". The group were sent to the UK to record the track, which had originally been recorded, but never released, by Sheila Ferguson from The Three Degrees. Some of her backing vocals remained on the Sequal version.

While they were thrilled to be working with SAW, as they were big fans of the producers' work with Princess, the band were disappointed that their vocals were multi-tracked, in accordance with SAW's usual style. While the track was significantly remixed, in the style of Soul II Soul, for a UK single release, it failed the chart.

Other notable contributors to the album included Kurtis Mantronik ("Tell the Truth"), Michael Morejon, and Martineé. Neither the album nor the singles hit the pop charts, although some singles did become club hits.

The group split in 1990, and Christensen later formed the group 3rd Party in the late 1990s; that group's major claim to fame was the song "Waiting for Tonight", which Jennifer Lopez covered on her debut album.

In 2008, the duo reunited and released the song "My Love for You", available on iTunes.

== Discography ==
=== Albums ===
- Sequal (1988, reissued 2012)

=== Singles ===
- "It's Not Too Late" (1985)
- "She Don't Want You" (1986)
- "Stand By" (1986)
- "I'm Over You" (1988) (US Dance #11)
- "Tell Him I Called" (1988)
- "Tell the Truth" (1988) (US Dance #9)
- "Brand New Love" (1989)
- "My Love for You" (2008)
- "There's More to Love" - appears on Freestyle Miami Style Vol. 3
