= Tears on My Pillow =

1958 single by Little Anthony and the Imperials

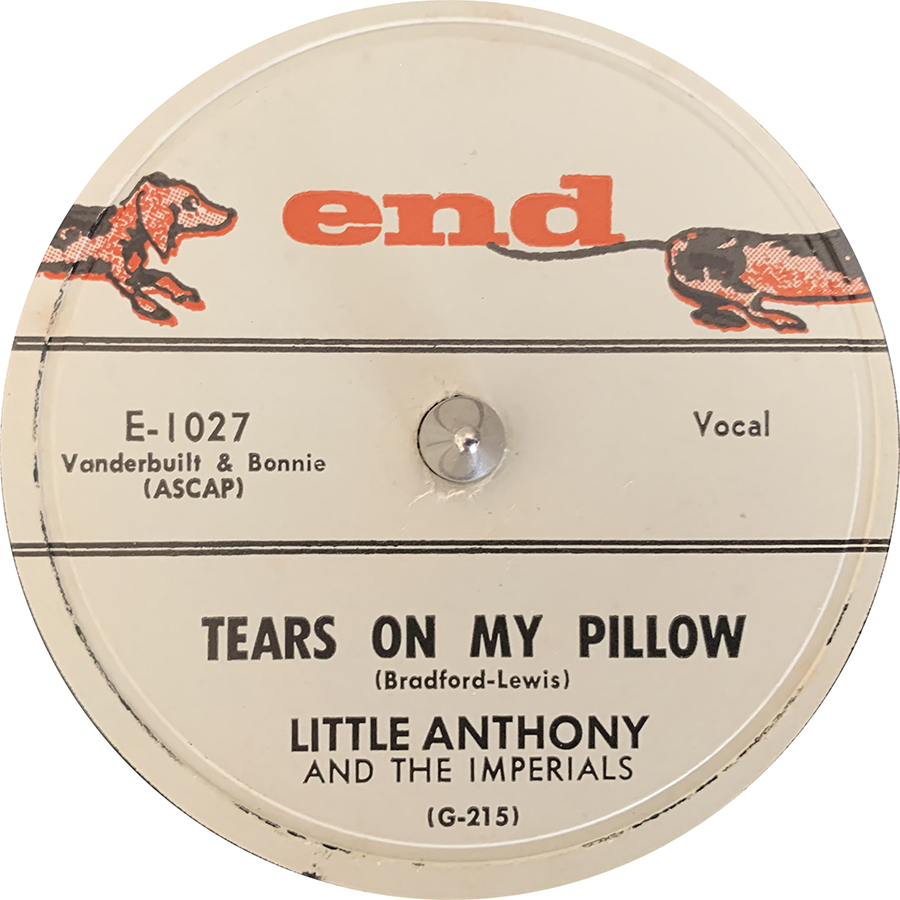
- The label for the U.S. 78 RPM single

Single by Little Anthony and the Imperials

from the album We Are the Imperials Featuring Little Anthony
- B-side: "Two People in the World"
- Released: August 1958
- Genre: Doo-wop
- Length: 2:20
- Label: End
- Songwriters: Sylvester Bradford; Al Lewis

Little Anthony and the Imperials singles chronology
"Tears on My Pillow" (1958)	"The Glory of Love" (1958)

Audio video
- "Tears on My Pillow" on YouTube

"Tears on My Pillow" is a doo-wop song written by Sylvester Bradford and Al Lewis in 1958. The composition was first recorded by Little Anthony and the Imperials on End Records and was that group's debut recording under that name. Their original recording of the song became a Billboard top-10 hit, peaking at No. 4 and No. 3 in Canada, and was the Imperials' first million-seller. It was also a two-sided hit, with its flip side, "Two People in the World," also becoming a major hit. Although it remains one of the Imperials' signature songs, "Tears on My Pillow" has been extensively covered, including a No. 1 in the UK Singles Chart version by Kylie Minogue in January 1990.

== The Imperials original version ==
Early copies of the single were credited simply to "The Imperials," a group that had previously been known as "The Duponts" and "The Chesters." Brooklyn DJ Alan Freed gave the group's lead singer, Anthony Gourdine, top billing while introducing the single over the air, and the moniker of "Little Anthony and the Imperials" stuck.

"Tears on My Pillow" was a #4 hit single in the United States and #3 in Canada. Selling over a million copies, "Tears on My Pillow" was the most successful single of the Imperials' doo-wop period. Its success would be matched only by the Imperials' 1964 single "Goin' Out of My Head." The Imperials ("Little Anthony" Gourdine, Clarence Collins, Ernest Wright, Tracy Lord, and Nate Rogers—the last two of whom were later replaced by Sammy Strain) performed the song on numerous TV programs, including The Dick Clark Show and on the PBS Oldies special, Rock, Rhythm, and Doo-Wop, in 1958 and 2002, respectively. They also performed the tune on the American Bandstand 40th Anniversary Special (also in 2002).

== Covers ==
The song has been covered many times, most notably by Kylie Minogue and also by Johnny Tillotson in 1969, his version reaching No. 119 on the U.S. Billboard, No. 98 on Cash Box, and No. 94 in Canada.

The song was also performed by Sha Na Na in the movie Grease from 1978 and included on the soundtrack.

In 2003, the song was revived and included on the S Club 8 album Sundown. The group of teens also performed it on the ITV British musical television special, GreaseMania.

== Other uses ==
"Tears on My Pillow" is referenced by Dean Friedman in his 1977 hit song "Ariel." It is included in the lyrics, "I met a young girl; she sang mighty fine, 'Tears on My Pillow' and 'Ave Maria.'"

The song was also used in the season one seventh episode of Sliders entitled "The Weaker Sex," which originally aired as episode six. The character Rembrandt Brown (played by Cleavant Derricks) sings the song repeatedly on the street to raise money for a motel room.

== Kylie Minogue version ==
"Tears on My Pillow"

Single by Kylie Minogue

from the album Enjoy Yourself
- B-side: "We Know the Meaning of Love"; "Nothing to Lose"
- Released: January 8, 1990
- Studio: PWL (London, England)
- Genre: Pop
- Length: 2:30
- Label: PWL; Mushroom; Geffen
- Songwriters: Sylvester Bradford; Al Lewis
- Producer: Stock Aitken Waterman

Kylie Minogue singles chronology
"Never Too Late" (1989)	"Tears on My Pillow" (1990)	"Better the Devil You Know" (1990)

Music video
- "Tears on My Pillow" on YouTube

Australian singer Kylie Minogue released a cover of "Tears on My Pillow" as the final single from her second studio album, Enjoy Yourself, on January 8, 1990. Minogue's cover was also included on the soundtrack of the film The Delinquents, which she also starred in. The song reached No. 1 on the UK Singles Chart for one week in January 1990, the final British chart topper by Stock Aitken Waterman (SAW), and reached No. 35 on the Canadian Adult Contemporary chart.

=== Critical reception ===
Bill Coleman from Billboard wrote, "Aussie lass offers a faithful reading of the Little Anthony & the Imperials classic. Pop and AC programmers should take note." A reviewer from Music & Media said the song "has been re-interpreted in a wholly predictable way." Lisa Tilston of Record Mirror praised the song as "a perfect pop song", adding that it "puts Kylie way ahead of the PWL pack by virtue of a) she can really sing and b) she'll look fantastic in the video". Similarly, James Hamilton of the same magazine considered "Tears on My Pillow" an "excellent faithful revival" of the original song, "flipped by the plaintively tuneful scurrying 'We Know the Meaning of Love' (120bpm)". Indeed, the track's B-side, a brand new track, "We Know The Meaning of Love", has been cited as one of SAW's best flip sides and a landmark in Minogue's musical progression ahead of the release of her more mature third album, Rhythm of Love. In 2023, Robert Moran of The Sydney Morning Herald ranked the song as Minogue's 161st best song (out of 183), adding that he did not like it.

=== Music video ===
The accompanying music video for "Tears on My Pillow" shows Kylie in a black dress with a Brigitte Bardot-inspired hairstyle singing the song. It is intercut with clips from the 1989 film The Delinquents.

=== Live performances ===
Minogue performed the song on the following concert tours:

- Disco in Dream/The Hitman Roadshow
- Enjoy Yourself Tour (performed as an a cappella)
- Rhythm of Love Tour
- Let's Get to It Tour
- Anti Tour
- Kylie Summer 2015 Tour (performed as an a cappella)

The song was also performed on:

- The Kylie Show 2007 TV special

=== Track listings ===
CD single

1. "Tears on My Pillow" - 2:33
2. "We Know the Meaning of Love" (Extended) - 5:50
3. "Tears on My Pillow" (More Tears Mix) - 4:14

7-inch vinyl single

1. "Tears on My Pillow" - 2:28
2. "We Know the Meaning of Love" - 3:25

12-inch vinyl single

1. "Tears on My Pillow" (More Tears Mix) - 4:14
2. "We Know the Meaning of Love" (Extended) - 5:50

US and Canadian cassette

1. "Tears on My Pillow" - 2:33
2. "Nothing to Lose" - 3:20

=== Charts ===
==== Weekly charts ====
Chart (1989–1990)	Peak position
Australia (ARIA)	20
Belgium (Ultratop 50 Flanders)	9
Canada Adult Contemporary (RPM)	35
Europe (Eurochart Hot 100)	2
Finland (Suomen virallinen lista)	5
Ireland (IRMA)	2
Luxembourg (Radio Luxembourg)	1
Netherlands (Dutch Top 40)	19
Netherlands (Single Top 100)	20
New Zealand (Recorded Music NZ)	33
Spain (AFYVE)	14
UK Singles (Official Charts)	1
UK Dance (Music Week)	38
West Germany (GfK)	31

==== Year-end charts ====
Chart (1990)	Position
Belgium (Ultratop 50 Flanders)	41
Europe (Eurochart Hot 100)	76
Europe (European Airplay Top 50)	39
UK Singles (OCC)	34

=== Certifications ===
Region	Certification	Certified units/sales
United Kingdom (BPI)	Silver	260,000

== See also ==
- List of UK singles chart number ones of the 1990s
