= Sequal (album) =

Studio album by Sequal
- Released: May 1988
- Recorded: 1985–1988
- Genre: Latin freestyle
- Label: Capitol/EMI Records; 0777 7 90000 2 9 C2-90000 Cherry Pop Records (2012 reissue); CRPOPD98
- Producer: Lewis A. Martineé; Kurtis Mantronik; Stock Aitken Waterman; Michael Morejon; Justin Strauss; Murray Elias; Mohamed Moretta

Professional ratings
Review scores
Source	Rating
Allmusic	link

Sequal is the only album by Sequal.

The album was later re-issued with an accompanying disc of remixes by Cherry Red on its Cherry Pop label.

== Track listing ==
No.	Title	Writer(s)	Length
1.	"Tell Him I Called"	Stock Aitken Waterman	4:14
2.	"Tell the Truth"	Abraham, Wolachuck, Bach	4:20
3.	"I'm Over You"	Angie Vollaro, Miguel Morejon	4:40
4.	"Could've Had My Love"	M. Abraham, K. Khaleel	4:18
5.	"Why Can’t We Be Lovers"	Holland–Dozier–Holland	5:10
6.	"Let It Go"		3:59
7.	"Took Another Chance"		3:57
8.	"Brand-New Love"	Angie Vollaro, Miguel Morejon	3:59
9.	"Out of Sight, Out of Mind"		5:28
10.	"She Don't Want You"	Miguel Morejon	3:42
11.	"It's Not Too Late"	Lewis A. Martineé	5:10

=== 2012 reissue bonus tracks ===
Disc one
No.	Title	Writer(s)	Length
12.	"Tell Him I Called (7" Watermix)"	Stock Aitken Waterman
13.	"I'm Over You (Newk Yor Mix)"	Angie Vollaro, Miguel Morejon
14.	"Tell the Truth (Rock the Truth)"	Abraham, Wolachuck, Bach
15.	"Brand-New Love (NYC Radio Mix)"	Angie Vollaro, Miguel Morejon
16.	"Tell Him I Called (The Master Jam)"	Stock Aitken Waterman

Disc two
No.	Title	Writer(s)	Length
1.	"Tell Him I Called (12" Watermix)"	Stock Aitken Waterman
2.	"I'm Over You (Sunshine House Mix)"	Angie Vollaro, Miguel Morejon
3.	"Tell the Truth (Groove the Truth)"	Abraham, Wolachuck, Bach
4.	"Brand-New Love (Popstand Club/Dub)"	Angie Vollaro, Miguel Morejon
5.	"Could've Had My Love (Mantronik Mix)"	M. Abraham, K. Khaleel
6.	"I'm Over You (Maxi-Miamix-Mix)"	Angie Vollaro, Miguel Morejon
7.	"Brand New Love (Florida Mix)"	Angie Vollaro, Miguel Morejon
8.	"Could've Had My Love (Miami Mix)"	M. Abraham, K. Khaleel
9.	"I'm Over You (Over-Easy Dub)"	Angie Vollaro, Miguel Morejon
10.	"Tell the Truth (Bomb the Dub)"	Abraham, Wolachuck, Bach
11.	"Could've Had My Love (Dub)"	M. Abraham, K. Khaleel
12.	"I'm Over You (Dubbed Over You)"	Angie Vollaro, Miguel Morejon
13.	"Tell Him I Called (Oboe Mix)"	Stock Aitken Waterman
