= Je ne sais pas pourquoi =

1988 single by Kylie Minogue

- Australian sleeve of "I Still Love You (Je ne sais pas pourquoi)"

Single by Kylie Minogue

from the album Kylie
- B-side: "Made in Heaven"
- Released: 10 October 1988
- Studio: PWL Studios (London, England)
- Genre: Teen pop; synth-pop; disco-pop
- Length: 4:01
- Label: PWL; Mushroom; Geffen
- Songwriters: Mike Stock; Matt Aitken; Pete Waterman
- Producer: Stock Aitken Waterman

Kylie Minogue singles chronology
"The Loco-Motion" (1988)	"Je ne sais pas pourquoi" (1988)	"Especially for You" (1988)

Music video
- "Je ne sais pas pourquoi" on YouTube

"Je ne sais pas pourquoi" (English: "I Do Not Know Why"), also known as "I Still Love You (Je ne sais pas pourquoi)" in Australia and New Zealand, is a song by Australian recording artist and songwriter Kylie Minogue from her debut studio album Kylie (1988). Released as a single on 10 October 1988 by PWL, the song has subsequently appeared on most of Minogue's hits compilations including Greatest Hits (1992), Ultimate Kylie (2004) and, most recently, Step Back in Time: The Definitive Collection, released in 2019. Like most of Minogue's material between 1988 and 1992, it was written and produced by Stock Aitken Waterman.

== Background ==
The song, with its French inspired theme and accompanying video, was released as the fourth single in October 1988, and was taken from the debut studio album Kylie. It was written and produced by Stock Aitken Waterman, who produced Minogue's first four studio albums. "Je ne sais pas pourquoi" is a teen-pop ballad, which is also inspired by dance-pop, which features instrumentals including drum machine, synthesizers, and some minor guitar riffs. Producer Pete Waterman claimed the idea for the use of French in the song came from observing the fascination that many younger fans had with language and mastering pronunciation. Commercially, the song received good chart success, peaking in the top ten in countries including Finland (where it peaked at number one), Ireland, New Zealand and the United Kingdom, while peaking in the top twenty in countries like Australia, France, Germany, and Norway. Pete Waterman said he believed the song would not have been a hit had it not been for Minogue's huge appeal as a pop star. "Je ne sais pas pourquoi" had been performed at Minogue's world tours such as Disco in Dream/The Hitman Roadshow, Enjoy Yourself Tour, Rhythm of Love Tour, Let's Get To It Tour, Showgirl: The Greatest Hits Tour, and the Summer 2019 Tour.

== Music video ==
The video is meant to look like it is shot in Paris in the 1940s or '50s as Minogue waits in the rain for her date to arrive and then heads to a café. Minogue's hair is set in waves and she is wearing a blue dress and matching angora cardigan. This is later intercut with a street scene that is filmed in black and white and depicts Minogue wearing a floral dress as she dances with a man. Minogue is the only colourful part of the scene.

== "Made in Heaven" ==
"Made in Heaven"

Single by Kylie Minogue
- A-side: "Je ne Sais pas pourquoi"
- Released: 10 October 1988
- Studio: London, England
- Genre: Teen pop
- Length: 3:29
- Label: PWL; Mushroom; Geffen
- Songwriters: Mike Stock; Matt Aitken; Pete Waterman
- Producer: Stock Aitken Waterman

Music video
- "Made in Heaven" on YouTube

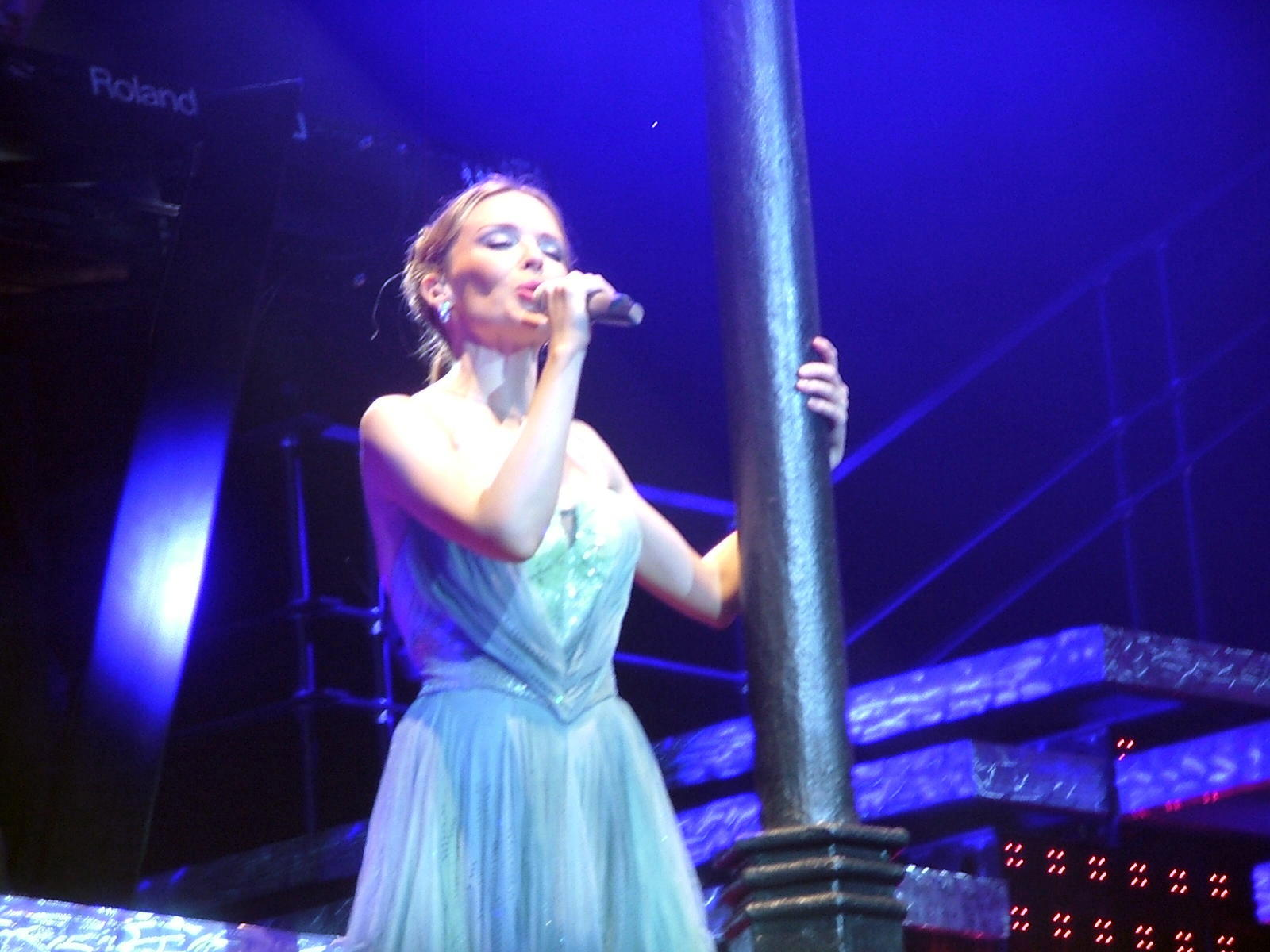
Minogue performing "Je ne sais pas pourquoi" during Showgirl: The Greatest Hits Tour (2005)

"Made in Heaven" was released as the single's B-side and also was written and produced by Stock, Aitken and Waterman. It was a new song which was not included on the album Kylie and an extended remix was also included on the 12" single. A promotional video was produced for "Made in Heaven" which was first issued on the Stock Aitken Waterman hits compilation, The Hit Factory Volume 3 and later on the Greatest Hits 87–92 compilation.

In the UK territory, "Je ne sais pas pourquoi" was originally planned to be released as a double A-side with "Made in Heaven". The original plan was to heavily promote "Je ne sais pas pourquoi" during the singles' early chart run, and once the song had peaked, the single would be officially 'flipped' and promotional emphasis shifted to "Made in Heaven" which would become the listed A-side. This marketing tactic had been used similarly with Rick Astley's single "When I Fall In Love"/"My Arms Keep Missing You" with the latter song becoming the singles' 'official' A-side after Christmas 1987. However, after reaching number 2 for 3 consecutive weeks, "Je ne sais pas pourquoi", although included on the widely available Kylie album, performed so well on its own that the plans to release it as a double A-side single were changed. In 2023, Robert Moran of Australian daily tabloid newspaper The Sydney Morning Herald ranked the song as Minogue's 52nd best song (out of 183), considering it a "hidden gem" with a "chorus [which] has an echo of Spiller's "Groovejet (If This Ain't Love)" which came out over a decade later".

The video to "Made to Heaven" solely involves Minogue dancing in front of a bluescreen with images of her previous five videos sampled behind her. She was surrounded by a halo of light and it was the last video before she began to routinely involve dancers and choreographed routines in her videos and performances. Kylie performed "Made in Heaven" at the "Royal Variety Performance" in front of the Queen Mother where she announced it as her new song - "Made in Heaven" was however never released as an A-side anywhere but it was used as the B-side to the international releases of both "It's No Secret" and "Turn It into Love". "Je ne sais pas pourquoi" was the 20th biggest selling single of 1988 in the UK.

== Chart performance ==
"Je ne sais pas pourquoi" was successful in the United Kingdom, where it debuted at number 11 on the UK Singles Chart, rose to number two where it stayed for three consecutive weeks, behind Enya's "Orinoco Flow", thus becoming Minogue's fourth consecutive top-two hit in less than a year. The song fell off the chart after fourteen weeks and went on to sell 315,000 copies, which allowed it to receive a silver disc awarded by the British Phonographic Industry. It was also a top-ten hit in four other European nations: it topped the chart in Luxembourg and Finland, reached number two in Ireland where it charted for seven weeks, and spent a sole week at number 10 in Norway. It reached the top 20 in Denmark where it peaked at number 11, in France where it debuted at number 33 and rose to number 15 with fifteen weeks in the top 50, and in Germany where it peaked at number 14 in its third week and spent 15 weeks in the top 100. In addition, it was a top-30 hit in Switzerland and the Flanders region of Belgium where it reached number 24 and 27, respectively, and stalled at number 43 on the Dutch Top 40. On the pan-European Hot 100 Singles chart compiled by the Music & Media magazine, it reached number eight in its fourth week on the chart.

Outside Europe, the song was released under the title "I Still Love You (Je ne sais pas pourquoi)". It debuted at number thirteen on the Australian Singles Chart and four weeks later, rose to number 11. In New Zealand, it debuted at number 38 on the New Zealand Singles Chart and peaked at number 9 the following week. In the United States, the song failed to reach the Billboard Hot 100.

== Impact and legacy ==
In 2019, James Masterton described it a "heartfelt and wistful ballad" which he considered "a better choice as a soundtrack to long winter evenings rather than at the height of summer", adding that "by eschewing the dance-pop style of [Minogue's] earlier hits [it] was the perfect demonstration of just how versatile" SAW were. In 2020, Alexis Petridis of British daily newspaper The Guardian ranked the song at number 11 in his "Kylie's 30 greatest singles" list, adding that it "saw [Stock, Aitken and Waterman] dial down the tinniness to something approaching subtlety: it also had a genuinely lovely tune". In 2023, in the same newspaper, he listed the song at number 13 in his "Stock Aitken Waterman's 20 greatest songs – ranked!", adding that it was "the first sign that the trio realised they had something special on their hands and stepped back from their blaring one-size-fits-all approach: a succession of earworm melodies that feels relatively subtle by their standards in the late 80s." In 2023, Robert Moran of Australian daily tabloid newspaper The Sydney Morning Herald ranked the song as Minogue's 57th best song (out of 183), adding, "The sort of wistful pop which, 35 years on, still feels like Kylie's bread and butter. Today, it would kill in a mix next to some Carly Rae (maybe listened to at 1.5x speed)".

== Formats and track listings ==
These are the formats and track listings of major single releases of "Je ne sais pas pourquoi".

CD single
(PWCD21)

1. "Je ne sais pas pourquoi" (Moi Non Plus mix) – 5:55
2. "Made in Heaven" (Maid in England mix) – 6:20
3. "The Loco-Motion" (Sankie mix – long version) – 6:55

7-inch single
(PWL21)

1. "Je ne sais pas pourquoi" – 4:01
2. "Made in Heaven" – 3:29

12-inch single
(PWLT21)

1. "Je ne sais pas pourquoi" (Moi Non Plus mix) – 5:55
2. "Made in Heaven" (Maid in England mix) – 6:20

UK 12-inch remix
(PWLT21R)

1. "Je ne sais pas pourquoi" (The Revolutionary mix) – 7:16
2. "Made in Heaven" (Maid in England mix) – 6:20

US 12-inch single
(0-21247)

1. "Je ne sais pas pourquoi" (Moi Non Plus mix) – 5:55
2. "Je ne sais pas pourquoi" (The Revolutionary mix) – 7:16
3. "Made in Heaven" (Maid in England mix) – 6:20

== Live performances ==
Minogue performed the song on the following concert tours:

- Disco in Dream/The Hitman Roadshow
- Enjoy Yourself Tour
- Rhythm of Love Tour
- Showgirl: The Greatest Hits Tour
- Summer 2019

== Charts ==
=== Weekly charts ===
1988 weekly chart performance for "Je ne sais pas pourquoi"
Chart (1988)	Peak position
Australia (ARIA)	11
Belgium (Ultratop 50 Flanders)	27
Denmark (IFPI)	11
Europe (European Hot 100 Singles)	8
Europe (European Airplay Top 50)	16
Finland (Suomen virallinen lista)	1
France (SNEP)	15
Ireland (IRMA)	2
Luxembourg (Radio Luxembourg)	1
Netherlands (Single Top 100)	43
New Zealand (Recorded Music NZ)	9
Norway (VG-lista)	10
South Africa (Springbok Radio)	27
Switzerland (Schweizer Hitparade)	24
UK Singles (Official Charts)	2
UK Dance (Music Week)	3
West Germany (GfK)	14

=== Year-end charts ===
1988 year-end chart performance for "Je ne sais pas pourquoi"
Chart (1988)	Position
UK Singles (OCC)	20
West Germany (Media Control)	97

== Certifications ==
Region	Certification	Certified units/sales
United Kingdom (BPI)	Silver	325,000
