= Enjoy Yourself (Kylie Minogue album) =

1989 album by Kylie Minogue

- International cover

Studio album by Kylie Minogue
- Released: 9 October 1989
- Recorded: February–July 1989
- Studio: PWL
- Genres: Dance-pop; bubblegum pop; synth-pop; disco
- Length: 32:56
- Labels: Mushroom; PWL; Geffen
- Producer: Stock Aitken Waterman

Kylie Minogue chronology
Kylie (1988)	Enjoy Yourself (1989)	Rhythm of Love (1990)

Singles from Enjoy Yourself
- 1. "Hand on Your Heart" Released: 24 April 1989; 2. "Wouldn't Change a Thing" Released: 24 July 1989; 3. "Never Too Late" Released: 23 October 1989; 4. "Tears on My Pillow" Released: 8 January 1990

Enjoy Yourself is the second studio album by Australian singer Kylie Minogue, released on 9 October 1989 in the United Kingdom by Pete Waterman Entertainment (PWE), and in Australia on 6 November by Mushroom Records. In the United States, it was released in January 1990 by Geffen Records. Following the success of her self-titled debut album, Minogue reunited with the producers Stock Aitken Waterman, who produced and wrote nine of the album's ten tracks, in London in February 1989. The recording sessions took place there from February until July, coinciding with Minogue filming her first feature film The Delinquents.

Enjoy Yourself is a bubblegum pop, dance-pop, and disco album that mainly discusses romantic relationships. It received mixed reviews from music critics, who criticised its similarity with her debut release. In the United Kingdom, it debuted at number one with pre-sales of over 600,000 copies and became the sixth best-selling album of 1989. The album was certified four times platinum by the British Phonographic Industry (BPI) in January 1990. It also peaked at number one in Ireland and within the top ten in Australia, Japan and New Zealand. It failed to find an audience in the United States, and Minogue was dropped as an act by Geffen Records.

Four singles were released from the album, including UK chart-toppers "Hand on Your Heart" and "Tears on My Pillow". Two other singles, "Wouldn't Change a Thing" and "Never Too Late" peaked in the top five. All four peaked in the top twenty in Australia and Ireland. The album was promoted further through Minogue's first and second concert tours, Disco in Dream (1989) and the Enjoy Yourself Tour (1990), which traveled to Australia, Britain and Asia. The album was re-issued in the United Kingdom for the first time in 2015, when it returned to the UK Albums Chart.

== Background and recording ==
Minogue first came to public attention in 1986, when she was cast in the popular soap opera Neighbours as Charlene Robinson, a schoolgirl turned garage mechanic. She signed with Mushroom Records in early 1987 and released her self-titled debut studio album in July 1988. Fuelled by hit singles like "I Should Be So Lucky", "The Loco-Motion" and "Got to Be Certain", Kylie peaked at number one and was the best-selling album of 1988 in the United Kingdom. In her native Australia, it peaked at number two and was certified four times platinum by the Australian Recording Industry Association (ARIA). It has sold over five million copies worldwide. The album helped Minogue launch her career as a pop artist at a time when not many established actors in television chose to make a record.

Minogue relocated to London after filming her final scenes for Neighbours in June and July 1988. In November, she lent her voice to "Especially for You", a duet with her then-boyfriend Jason Donovan, who also played her love interest in Neighbours. Written and produced by Stock Aitken Waterman (SAW), it became the fourth highest-selling single of 1988 and the first number-one single of 1989 in the United Kingdom. In February 1989, she reunited with the producers at PWL Studios 1 & 4 in London. The trio, who had served as producers and writers on Kylie, had Minogue record "Hand on Your Heart" and "Wouldn't Change a Thing", while working on her second album. Pete Waterman, one of the producers, felt that they had a remarkable work ethic during the making of Enjoy Yourself, saying "We aren't nervous about following up the first album at all, we were on a treadmill and loving it". The album was licensed by PWL co-owner David Howell.

Two months later, it was announced that Minogue had accepted the lead part of Lola Lovell in the Australian-based film The Delinquents, directed by Chris Thomson. Trying to establish herself as a serious actress, Minogue believed the role as a rebellious and passionate country girl would differentiate her from her girl-next-door image in Neighbours. Principal photography began in Maryborough, Queensland, in May and lasted about two months. She resumed work on her album in London for three weeks until July. The three-week recording sessions were intense since she was still promoting her debut album. For The Delinquents' soundtrack, Waterman suggested Minogue cover The Teenagers' "I'm Not a Juvenile Delinquent" (1957) or Little Anthony and the Imperials' "Tears on My Pillow" (1958). Minogue picked the latter work, as she was already familiar with the song, and recorded it the next day. She recorded "Never Too Late" during the final sessions in July.

== Music and lyrics ==
"Hand on Your Heart"
Inspired by soul music, "Hand on Your Heart" is one of the R&B-influenced songs included on Enjoy Yourself.

Stock, Aitken and Waterman wrote and produced the entire album apart from "Tears on My Pillow", which was written by Sylvester Bradford and Al Lewis. Minogue and the producers decided that the album would be more diverse than the previous effort, which was mainly dance music. "There are a lot of different songs... Enjoy Yourself has balance and a sort-of fifties orchestra number... I think it has a wider range of appeal [than Kylie]", Minogue said. The album contains many R&B basslines, which Stock felt shows different aspects of pop music and gives "a slightly more soulful, more American angle, a kind of serious feel". He wrote simple lyrics about romantic relationships to give the songs "extra resonance and profundity".

Music critics have described Enjoy Yourself as a bubblegum pop, synth-pop, dance-pop, and disco album, whose theme revolves around romantic relationships. They also noted the similar composition of the songs to those on Minogue's debut album. Nick Levine of Digital Spy said that the album sounded "more perky, plasticky Stock Aitken Waterman pop" than the previous effort. Joe Sweeney of PopMatters felt that Minogue was no longer bridging the gap between pop and dance music, but trying to expand from the "still-Astley-rific SAW house sound" by incorporating ballad and doo-wop tracks. Ian Gormely of Exclaim! compared the bubblegum synth-pop sound to the work of American singers Tiffany and Debbie Gibson. Gary James of Entertainment Focus called it a well-merged complication of her debut and the throwback sound of the '50s and '60s.

== Songs analysis ==
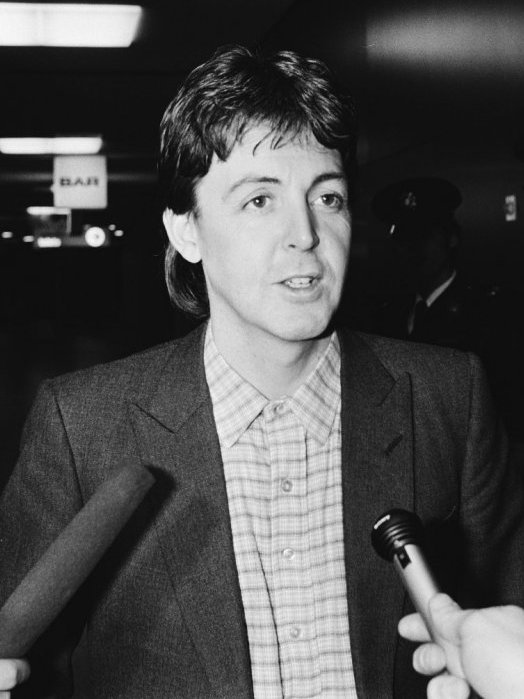
"Tell Tale Signs" and "My Secret Heart" received comparisons to the work of Paul McCartney (pictured in 1980).

"Hand on Your Heart" is a beat-heavy song that contains a message about honesty and communication in a relationship. The song was inspired by soul singles "That's the Way Love Is" by Ten City (1989) and "This Old Heart of Mine (Is Weak for You)" by The Isley Brothers (1966). "Wouldn't Change a Thing" deals with believing someone even if no one can understand, while "Never Too Late" follows Minogue's optimistic philosophy. Colin Irwin of Number One felt that both tracks have an easy and mellow pace but still maintain its appeal as dance-pop tracks, and found the yearning lyrics of the latter work similar to the work of Donovan.

The happy and bouncy track "Nothing to Lose" tells a story about taking risks to get what you want. It is followed by "Tell Tale Signs", a jazz-oriented blues and string-laden torch song, in which Minogue realizes the signs of a relationship falling apart. The offbeat baroque pop "My Secret Heart" contains unusual rhythms, key changes, stuttering cello sounds, and jaunty lyricism. Minogue characterized "My Secret Heart" as an innocent and hopeful fantasy song that reminds her of the 1940s romantic Hollywood films. Critics compared both "Tell Tale Signs" and "My Secret Heart" to the work of Paul McCartney. Minogue sings "I'm Over Dreaming (Over You)", the seventh track, in a celebratory and joyous way. Its subject matter centres around finding the courage to face the end of a relationship.

Colin Irwin of Number One felt that Minogue sounds authentic in her version of "Tears on My Pillow", an innocent ballad that differs from Johnny Nash's 1975 reggae hit of the same name. Levine, on the other hand, called it an "odd retro moment". Minogue found her version "smooth and easy to listen to" and fairly true to the original. The melodic "Heaven and Earth" shows Minogue's view on the environmental issues, and encourages people to conserve and protect the environment. It is followed by the title track, which serves as the album closer. Lyrically, it reminds people to be happy and enjoy themselves. Levine described it as a "party [song] with a Seize The Day message" that predicted Minogue's follow-up effort.

== Artwork and release ==
The album's artwork, shot by photographer Simon Fowler, shows Minogue grinning while wearing a black minidress and a bedazzling golden hat. Minogue was surprised about the final artwork, which she found "quite daring" and "does reveal a bit of flesh". "[The hat] is from London. I'm heavily into sequins at the moment... I don't think I would wear it down the street though," Minogue recalled. Like Kylie, the artwork was meant to show her in a girlie and carefree way that kids and teenagers could relate to, and not as "some icon on a pedestal". Other PWL artists used the same strategy and can be seen posing with hats on the covers of their albums. These include Mandy Smith's Mandy (1988) and Sonia's Everybody Knows (1990). The title, Enjoy Yourself, reflects Minogue's motto of living with a positive attitude in the face of life's difficulties.

Enjoy Yourself was released in the UK on 9 October 1989 by PWL. The album was not released in Australia until 6 November 1989, through Mushroom Records. In Japan, a limited edition was released in November with postcards, stickers and a lyric booklet. The North American edition, released by Geffen Records in 1990, had differing artwork and included "Especially for You" as a bonus track. In 1989, a VHS titled Kylie: The Videos 2 was released in the United Kingdom and Japan by PWL, including an interview with Minogue, as well as music videos for "It's No Secret", "Hand on Your Heart", "Wouldn't Change A Thing", and "Never Too Late". The album was re-released by WEA in Japan in 1993 and 1995, before PWL announced their reissue in 2012 with bonus tracks and mixes. In October 2014, it was announced that Enjoy Yourself was to be re-released by Cherry Red Records and PWL, along with her studio albums Kylie, Rhythm of Love, and Let's Get to It (1991). The release date was later postponed to 9 February 2015. The albums were digitally remastered from the original studio tapes and available on vinyl, CD, and DVD. This was the first time these albums had been released in the United Kingdom since their original release.

== Promotion ==
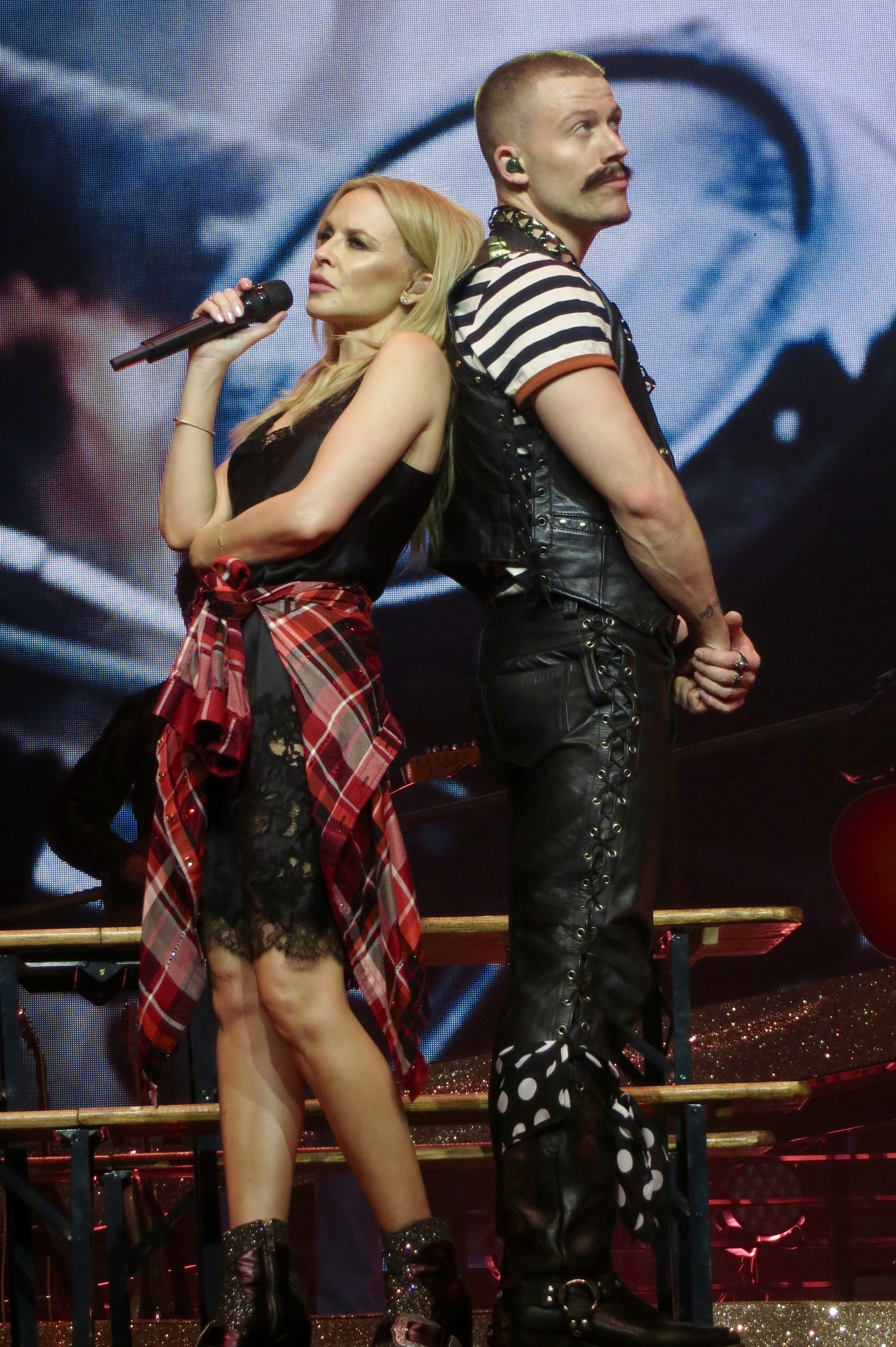
Minogue performing the single "Wouldn't Change a Thing" during one of the concerts of the Golden Tour (2018–19)

During the release week, the album was backed by a £250,000 advertising campaign on television, in teen magazines and music papers. In October 1989, Minogue launched her first concert tour, Disco in Dream, performing several songs from both Kylie and Enjoy Yourself. It began in Japan, where she performed before 38,000 fans at the Tokyo Dome. She later joined other artists from the PWL label on a ten-date theatre tour in the United Kingdom, which attracted 170,000 fans. Its run in the United Kingdom was sponsored by local radio stations and was re-titled The Hitman Roadshow.

=== Enjoy Yourself Tour ===
From February to May 1990, Minogue launched the Enjoy Yourself Tour. She performed three shows in her native Australia in February, grossing $3 million from the sale of 10,000 tickets per-show. The tour was later extended to Europe and South East Asia in April and May. Her performance in Birmingham, the first city of the European leg, attracted 12,700 fans at the Resorts World Arena. Minogue donated thirteen costume pieces worn in both concert tours to the Arts Centre Melbourne—three of them were given in 1991, two in 2008, and the rest were sent to the Cultural Gifts Program in 2004.

Enjoy Yourself Tour
- Tour by Kylie Minogue
- Associated album: Enjoy Yourself
- Start date: 3 February 1990
- End date: 26 May 1990
- Legs: 3
- No. of shows: 21

Kylie Minogue concert chronology
- Disco in Dream (1989); Enjoy Yourself Tour (1990); Rhythm of Love Tour (1991)

The Enjoy Yourself Tour was Minogue's second concert tour (following 1989's Disco in Dream ensemble roadshow) and first solo, full-length show following the success of her second studio album, Enjoy Yourself. By the start of the European leg of the tour, Minogue had started to take control of her image and musical direction, demonstrated by the release of the career milestone single "Better the Devil You Know", which would be performed as part of the encore after the Australian leg of the tour.

Set list

The set list adapted from Minogue's official website:

1. "The Loco-Motion"
2. "Got to Be Certain"
3. "Hand on Your Heart"
4. "Love at First Sight"
5. "Made in Heaven"
6. "My Girl"
7. "Tears on My Pillow"
8. "I Should Be So Lucky"
9. "I Miss You"
10. "Nothing to Lose"
11. "Blame It on the Boogie"
12. "ABC"
13. "Tell Tale Signs"
14. "Je Ne Sais Pas Pourquoi"
15. "Never Too Late"
16. "Wouldn't Change a Thing"
17. "Dance to the Music"
18. "Better the Devil You Know" (European shows only)
19. "Enjoy Yourself"

Dates

List of 1990 concerts, showing date, city, country, and venue
Date (1990)	City	Country	Venue
3 February	Brisbane	Australia	Brisbane Entertainment Centre
5 February	Sydney	Australia	Sydney Entertainment Centre
9 February	Melbourne	Australia	National Tennis Centre
17 April	Birmingham	United Kingdom	NEC Arena
18 April	Birmingham	United Kingdom	NEC Arena
19 April	Birmingham	United Kingdom	NEC Arena
20 April	London	United Kingdom	London Arena
21 April	London	United Kingdom	London Arena
23 April	London	United Kingdom	London Arena
25 April	Belfast	United Kingdom	King's Hall
27 April	Dublin	Ireland	RDS Simmonscourt
28 April	Dublin	Ireland	RDS Simmonscourt
29 April	Dublin	Ireland	RDS Simmonscourt
2 May	Whitley Bay	United Kingdom	Whitley Bay Ice Rink
8 May	Paris	France	La Cigale
10 May	Cologne	Germany	Sporthalle Köln
11 May	Hamburg	Germany	Alsterdorfer Sporthalle
12 May	Brussels	Belgium	Forest National
14 May	Glasgow	United Kingdom	SECC Concert Hall 4
15 May	Aberdeen	United Kingdom	AECC Arena
17 May	Birmingham	United Kingdom	NEC Arena
18 May	London	United Kingdom	Wembley Arena
24 May	Hong Kong		Hong Kong Coliseum
26 May	Bangkok	Thailand	Thailand Cultural Centre

=== Singles ===
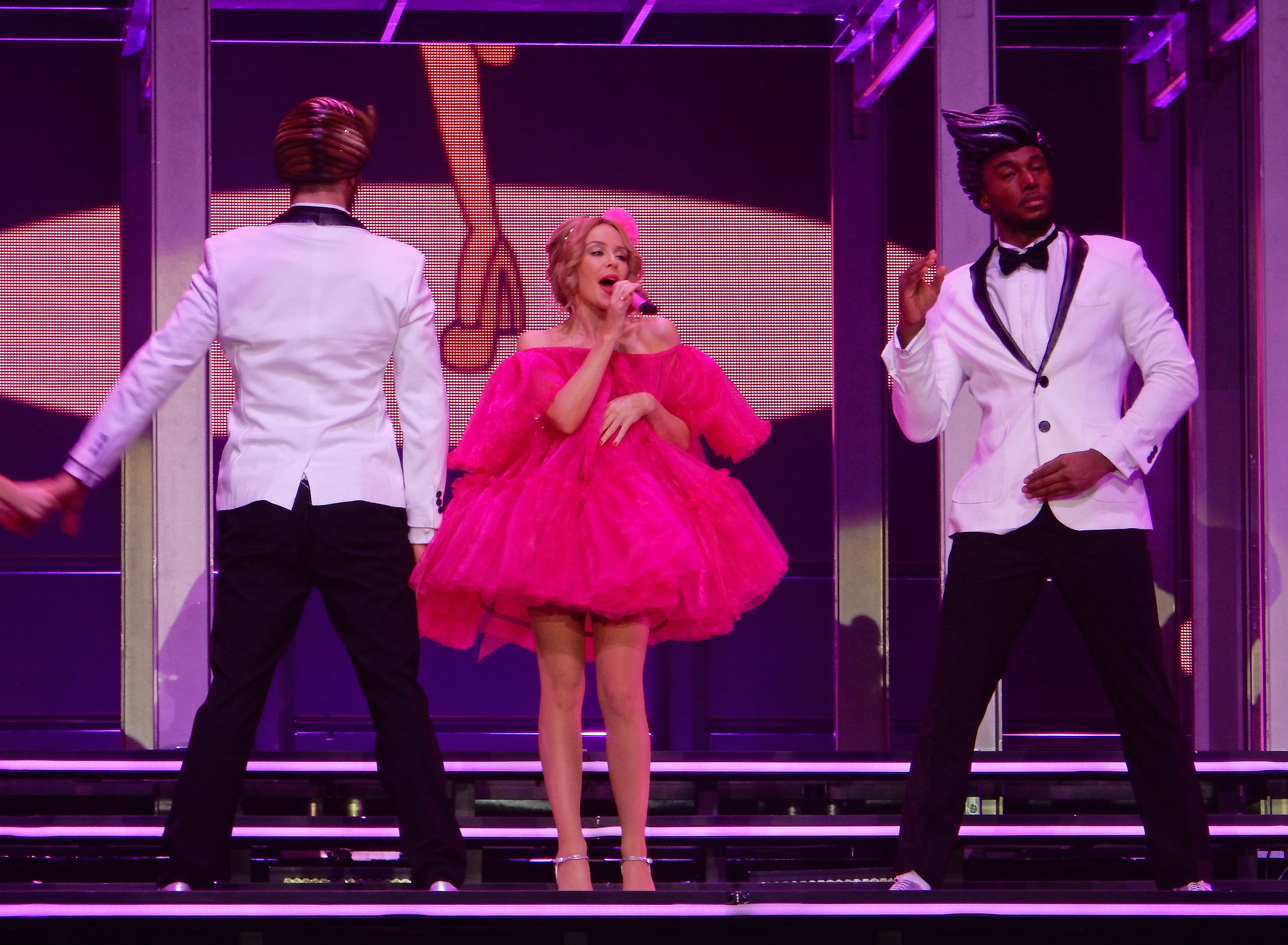
Minogue performing a medley of album tracks "Enjoy Yourself", "Hand on Your Heart" and "Never Too Late" during her Kiss Me Once Tour in Sheffield in November 2014

"Hand on Your Heart" was released as the first single in April 1989 with "Just Wanna Love You" as the B-side track. A music video, filmed in Melbourne earlier in March, was released featuring Minogue dancing in a studio set. The single received limited promotion as Minogue was busy filming The Delinquents. Nevertheless, the song became her third number one single on the UK Singles Chart, while reaching number four on the Australian Singles Chart. It reached number one in Ireland, and peaked in the top ten in Switzerland and France. The second single "Wouldn't Change a Thing" was released in July, accompanied by Minogue's first music video to be filmed in the UK. It debuted at number two there and reached number six in Australia that September.

The title track was originally planned as the third single but was replaced with "Never Too Late". The decision was made at the last minute before its release on 23 October. The track's B-side was a megamix of her songs from Kylie, titled "Kylie's Smiley Mix". "Never Too Late" became Minogue's fifth number-one single in Ireland and reached number four in the UK. The music video shows Minogue in various costumes: she dresses as a cowgirl, a '70s disco dancer, a Chinese woman with a handheld fan and a 1920s flapper. "Tears on My Pillow" was released as the final single to support both the album and The Delinquents. The single was pushed until January 1990 to meet the film's release schedule. It debuted at number two in the UK on 14 January, Minogue's ninth consecutive top-five single and her fourth to debut at number two. It reached number one the following week, her fourth single to do so. The 12" single was released with the B-side "We Know the Meaning of Love". "Never Too Late" and "Tears on My Pillow" also peaked in the top 20 in Australia and the Netherlands.

== Critical reception ==
Professional ratings
Review scores
Source	Rating
AllMusic	2.5/5 stars
Calgary Herald	C−
Chicago Tribune	2/5 stars
Digital Spy	3/5 stars
Encyclopedia of Popular Music	3/5 stars
PopMatters	5/10 stars
Q	2/5 stars
Rolling Stone	1/5 stars
Smash Hits	9/10 stars

Enjoy Yourself received mixed reviews from music critics, many of whom compared it to Minogue's debut album. Sean Smith and the staff of People magazine described it as an unimaginative extension of Kylie; the result was just "another Charlene album". Richard Lowe of Smash Hits and Nick Levine of Digital Spy opined that despite the lack of strong tunes, the album still had more variety than her first one and Minogue was "at her most ingenuous". Colin Irwin of Number One called the album a departure for Minogue, which shifts away from other traditional SAW-produced tracks. AllMusic's Chris True found it was a good follow-up to her debut, and the producers "knew what they had and they crafted songs that kept [Minogue] in the public eye."

Several critics panned the production and Minogue's lack of input on the album. Arion Berger of Rolling Stone dismissed the singer's woeful vocals, and commented that she had a long way to go to display any artistic innovation. People magazine opined that the producers overpowered Minogue, describing her as "a cog in a gray-noise machine". In a 2015 review, PopMatters' Joe Sweeney deemed it a more ambitious production and Minogue's vocals were particularly stronger than before. He felt the result, however, sounded "like a messy document of artistic maturation". Caitlin O'Connor Creevy of Chicago Tribune and a Billboard's reviewer deemed the album premature and average, while also panning the computer-generated songs.

In a review in 2018, Slant Magazine's Sal Cinquemani wrote that Enjoy Yourself closely repeats Kylie's sonic template and criticised "Hand on Your Heart" as a disjunctive lead single. He described it as Minogue's second-worst studio album. While reviewing the album on its 30th anniversary, Matt Hocter noted a maturity that was missing from Minogue's previous album. He concluded that Minogue had managed to make a pop album that is now recognised as a classic. In the Encyclopedia of Popular Music (2011), British writer Colin Larkin gave it three out of five stars, as he did Minogue's debut album, classifying it as "recommended" and highly listenable. At the ARIA Music Awards of 1990, Minogue was nominated for Best Female Artist for Enjoy Yourself while receiving the Outstanding Achievement Award. The music video for "Never Too Late" won the award for Most Popular Music Video at the 32nd Logie Awards, her second win in the category; she previously won for "The Loco-Motion" in 1988.

== Commercial performance ==
Enjoy Yourself debuted at number one on the UK Albums Chart and remained in the top 10 for sixteen weeks. It was certified double platinum by the British Phonographic Industry two days after its release, powered by pre-sales of over 600,000 copies. It went on to sell over one million copies in the first ten weeks of its release. It was the sixth best-selling album of 1989 in the UK, and was certified four times platinum on 1 January 1990. Enjoy Yourself returned to the UK Albums Chart in 2015, when the reissue peaked at number ninety-four on 15 February. In her native Australia, the album debuted at number fifteen before reaching number nine in the second week. It was certified platinum by the Australian Recording Industry Association in January 1990 for selling over 70,000 copies. It debuted at number sixteen in New Zealand and peaked at number six three weeks later. It was certified gold by the Recorded Music NZ in June 1990.

In Japan, Enjoy Yourself was Minogue's first top-ten entry on the Oricon Albums Chart, peaking at number seven. It was certified gold by Recording Industry Association of Japan in November 1989, her second and last certification there, and had sold 49,000 copies as of 2006. The album also peaked in the top 30 in Finland, France, and Switzerland. In North America, the album failed to find an audience and did not appear on any major charts, leading to Minogue being dropped as an act by Geffen Records. Enjoy Yourself was her last album released there until her eighth studio album, Fever was picked up by Capitol Records in 2002.

== Track listing ==
All songs written, produced and arranged by Mike Stock, Matt Aitken and Pete Waterman, except "Tears on My Pillow" by Sylvester Bradford and Al Lewis.

Enjoy Yourself – Standard version
No.	Title	Length
1.	"Hand on Your Heart"	3:51
2.	"Wouldn't Change a Thing"	3:14
3.	"Never Too Late"	3:22
4.	"Nothing to Lose"	3:21
5.	"Tell Tale Signs"	2:26
6.	"My Secret Heart"	2:41
7.	"I'm Over Dreaming (Over You)"	3:23
8.	"Tears on My Pillow"	2:30
9.	"Heaven and Earth"	3:44
10.	"Enjoy Yourself"	3:45
Total length:		32:56

Enjoy Yourself – North American version
No.	Title	Length
1.	"Hand on Your Heart"	3:51
2.	"Wouldn't Change a Thing"	3:14
3.	"Never Too Late"	3:22
4.	"Nothing to Lose"	3:21
5.	"Tell Tale Signs"	2:26
6.	"Especially for You" (duet with Jason Donovan)	3:59
7.	"My Secret Heart"	2:41
8.	"I'm Over Dreaming (Over You)"	3:23
9.	"Tears on My Pillow"	2:30
10.	"Heaven and Earth"	3:44
11.	"Enjoy Yourself"	3:45
Total length:		36:57

Kylie: The Videos 2
No.	Title	Length
1.	"Intro"	1:11
2.	"It's No Secret" (Music video)	4:43
3.	"Interview"	0:35
4.	"Hand on Your Heart" (Alternate Live video)	3:14
5.	"Interview"	0:33
6.	"Wouldn't Change a Thing" (Music video)	3:11
7.	"Interview"	0:55
8.	"Never Too Late" (Music video)	3:23
9.	"Outro & Credits"	1:28
Total length:		19:13

Enjoy Yourself – 2012 Japanese reissue bonus tracks
No.	Title	Length
11.	"Just Wanna Love You"	3:32
12.	"We Know the Meaning of Love"	3:31
13.	"Hand on Your Heart" (The Great Aorta Mix)	6:26
14.	"Wouldn't Change a Thing" (Your Thang Mix)	7:15
15.	"Never Too Late" (Extended)	6:10
16.	"I'm Over Dreaming (Over You)" (Extended Version)	4:56
17.	"Tears on My Pillow" (12" version)	4:20
Total length:		69:20

Enjoy Yourself – 2015 reissue deluxe version (Disc 1)
No.	Title	Length
11.	"Especially for You"	4:00
12.	"All I Wanna Do Is Make You Mine"	3:38
13.	"Just Wanna Love You"	3:32
14.	"We Know the Meaning of Love"	3:31
15.	"Hand on Your Heart" (The Great Aorta Mix)	6:26
16.	"Wouldn't Change a Thing" (Your Thang Mix)	7:15
17.	"Never Too Late" (Extended Version)	6:10
18.	"Tears on My Pillow" (Extended Version)	4:05
19.	"Especially for You" (Extended Version)	5:01
Total length:		76:34

Enjoy Yourself – 2015 reissue deluxe version (Disc 2)
No.	Title	Length
1.	"Hand on Your Heart" (The Heartache Mix)	5:22
2.	"Wouldn't Change a Thing" (The Espagna Mix)	5:47
3.	"I'm Over Dreaming (Over You)" (Extended Remix)	4:56
4.	"We Know the Meaning of Love" (Extended Version)	5:51
5.	"Tears on My Pillow" (12" Remix)	4:20
6.	"Especially for You" (Original 12" Mix)	5:00
7.	"All I Wanna Do Is Make You Mine" (Extended Version)	6:01
8.	"Hand on Your Heart" (Smokin' Remix)	5:33
9.	"Wouldn't Change a Thing" (Yoyo's 12" Mix)	6:38
10.	"Especially for You" (Original 7" Mix)	3:31
11.	"Hand on Your Heart" (Video Mix)	3:45
12.	"Wouldn't Change a Thing" (The Espagna Mix Edit)	4:17
13.	"Never Too Late" (Oz Tour Mix)	5:06
14.	"I'm Over Dreaming (Over You)" (7" Remix)	3:23
15.	"Hand on Your Heart" (Dub)	5:32
Total length:		73:02

Enjoy Yourself – 2015 reissue deluxe version (Disc 3)
No.	Title	Length
1.	"Especially for You" (Music video, duet with Jason Donovan)	3:35
2.	"Hand on Your Heart" (Music video)	3:44
3.	"Wouldn't Change a Thing" (Music video)	3:11
4.	"Never Too Late" (Music video)	3:23
5.	"Tears on My Pillow" (Music video)	2:28
6.	"Interviews & Intros" (Part of the bonus footage section)
7.	"The Making of "Never Too Late"" (Part of the bonus footage section)
8.	"Never Too Late" (Behind the Scenes, part of the bonus footage section)
9.	"Especially for You" (Live on Wogan)
10.	"Especially for You" (Live on Top of the Pops)
11.	"Hand on Your Heart" (Live on Top of the Pops)
12.	"Wouldn't Change a Thing" (Live on Wogan)
13.	"Wouldn't Change a Thing" (Live on Top of the Pops)
14.	"Never Too Late" (Live on Going Live!)
15.	"Never Too Late" (Live on Top of the Pops)

== Personnel ==
Adapted from the album's liner notes.

- Kylie Minogue – lead vocals, backing vocals
- Jason Donovan – vocals
- Mae McKenna – backing vocals
- Miriam Stockley – backing vocals
- Matt Aitken – production, keyboards, guitar, arrangements
- Pete Waterman – production, arrangements, mixing
- Mike Stock – production, backing vocals, keyboards, arrangements
- Ian Curnow – keyboards
- A Linn – drums
- Jason Barron – mixing
- Dave Ford – mixing
- Julian Gingell – mixing
- Pete Hammond – mixing
- Phil Harding – mixing
- Chris McDonnell – mixing
- Barry Stone – mixing
- Peter Day – engineering, mixing
- Karen Hewitt – engineering
- Greg Fulginiti – mastering
- Simon Fowler – photography
- Isabel Snyder^{[a]} – photography
- David Howells – design
- Kav DeLuxe^{[a]} – art direction, design
- Lino Carbosiero – hair

^{^a} For U.S. edition of the album

== Charts ==
=== Weekly charts ===
Chart performance for Enjoy Yourself in 1989
Chart (1989)	Peak position
Australian Albums (ARIA)	9
Belgian Albums (Ultratop 50 Wallonia)	3
Dutch Albums (Album Top 100)	50
European Albums (Music & Media)	6
Finnish Albums (Suomen virallinen lista)	12
French Albums (SNEP)	24
German Albums (Offizielle Top 100)	33
Greek Albums (IFPI)	2
Irish Albums (IFPI)	1
Japanese Albums (Oricon)	7
New Zealand Albums (RMNZ)	6
Spanish Albums (AFYVE)	16
Swedish Albums (Sverigetopplistan)	33
Swiss Albums (Schweizer Hitparade)	13
UK Albums (OCC)	1
UK Independent Albums (MRIB)	2

Chart performance for Enjoy Yourself in 2015
Chart (2015)	Peak position
UK Albums (OCC)	94

=== Year-end charts ===
1989 year-end chart performance for Enjoy Yourself
Chart (1989)	Position
Australian Albums (ARIA)	96
European Albums (Music & Media)	91
French Albums (SNEP)	80
UK Albums (OCC)	6

1990 year-end chart performance for Enjoy Yourself
Chart (1990)	Position
European Albums (Music & Media)	90
UK Albums (OCC)	90

== Certifications and sales ==
Certifications and sales for Enjoy Yourself
Region	Certification	Certified units/sales
Australia (ARIA)	Platinum	70,000^{^}
France (SNEP)	Gold	100,000^{*}
Hong Kong (IFPI Hong Kong)	Gold	10,000^{*}
Japan (RIAJ)	Gold	49,000
New Zealand (RMNZ)	Gold	7,500^{^}
Spain (Promusicae)	Gold	50,000^{^}
Switzerland (IFPI Switzerland)	Gold	25,000^{^}
United Kingdom (BPI)	4× Platinum	1,200,000^{^}
^{*} Sales figures based on certification alone.^{^} Shipments figures based on certification alone.

== Release history ==
Release dates and formats for Enjoy Yourself
Region	Date	Format(s)	Distributor(s)	Ref(s).
United Kingdom	9 October 1989	CD; cassette; LP	PWL	
Japan	1 November 1989	CD; cassette; LP	PWL	
Australia	6 November 1989	CD; cassette; LP	Mushroom Records	
United States	30 January 1990	CD; cassette; LP	Geffen Records	
Japan	10 July 1993	CD	WEA	
Japan	25 April 1995	CD	WEA	
Australia	29 September 1998	CD	Mushroom Records	
Japan	7 November 2012	CD	PWL	
United Kingdom	9 February 2015	CD; DVD; LP	Cherry Red; PWL	
Japan	9 February 2015	CD; DVD; LP	Cherry Red; PWL	

== See also ==
- List of UK Albums Chart number ones of the 1980s
- List of UK top-ten albums in 1989
- List of UK top-ten albums in 1990
