= Got to Be Certain =

1988 single by Kylie Minogue

Single by Kylie Minogue

from the album Kylie
- Released: 2 May 1988
- Studio: RBX (Melbourne, Australia)
- Genre: Pop; dance-pop
- Length: 3:19: 3:12 (video version); 3:06 (video version 2 - Location only)
- Label: Mushroom; PWL
- Songwriters: Mike Stock; Matt Aitken; Pete Waterman
- Producer: Stock Aitken Waterman

Kylie Minogue singles chronology
"I Should Be So Lucky" (1987)	"Got to Be Certain" (1988)	"The Loco-Motion" (1988)

Music video
- "Got to Be Certain" on YouTube

"Got to Be Certain" is a song by Australian singer Kylie Minogue from her debut studio album, Kylie (1988). Written and produced by English songwriting and record production trio Stock Aitken Waterman (SAW), the song was released as the second single from Kylie in most territories outside Australia, and was released on 2 May 1988 in Australia and the United Kingdom. In Australia, "Got to Be Certain" was Minogue's third single release. "Got to Be Certain" was a commercial success, peaking at number one in Minogue's native Australia and number two on the UK Singles Chart.

== Background and composition ==
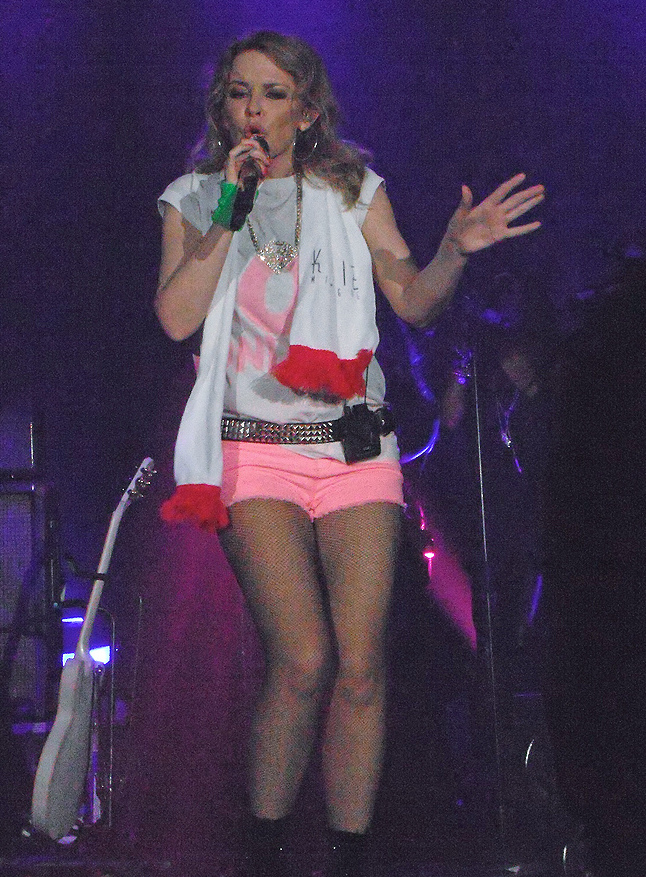
Minogue performing the track on her Anti Tour (2012)

With the success of her first two singles, "Locomotion" in 1987 and "I Should Be So Lucky" in early 1988, Minogue began work on her debut studio album Kylie. Initially declining to work with Stock, Aitken and Waterman again after feeling snubbed and disrespected when the producers kept her waiting to record "I Should Be So Lucky", Minogue was convinced to give the trio a second chance after Mike Stock flew to her native Melbourne, Australia in February 1988 and personally apologised to her and her family.

The track, along with two other album tracks, and future international singles "Turn It into Love" and "It's No Secret", was recorded in evening sessions while Minogue was working long hours on her TV show, Neighbours, with an exhausted Minogue at times breaking down in tears as the pressure of her situation mounted.

"Got to Be Certain" was not written especially for Minogue; it was first recorded by singer and PWL stablemate Mandy Smith for her debut album Mandy which was also produced by Stock Aitken Waterman. However, her version was shelved and the song was released by Minogue instead after Pete Waterman decided to abandon Smith's version amid general unhappiness at PWL over how the track was progressing. Smith's original recording of "Got to Be Certain" was denied by Mike Stock in his book The Hit Factory: The Stock Aitken Waterman Story, but it was eventually released in 2005 as a bonus track on the hits compilation Stock Aitken Waterman Gold. Smith's version was also added to the 2009 re-issue of her album.

== Music video ==
The music video for "Got to Be Certain" was directed by Chris Langman and filmed in April 1988. The video was filmed in Melbourne, Australia. A number of different edits of the video were produced amid creative tensions between the Mushroom Records team and PWL staff, with the latter strongly objecting to one of Kylie's hairstyles in the video's original cut. The director's cut version of the video starts off with Minogue at a photoshoot, posing in different poses. It then cuts to Minogue sitting in a coffee-house during the verses, then shows her on top of the T&G (now KPMG) Building on Melbourne's Collins Street during the bridge, wearing a "black boat-neck dress, white teeth gleaming, hair a perfect honey blonde and skin as gold as the coins that were piling in". Each of the first two choruses features Minogue walking around Melbourne's Yarra River and then walking through a park. The breakdown cuts to Minogue and her friends dancing around the coffee house, before the video ends with bloopers from the video shoot. This director's cut version is preserved on the 1988 The Kylie Collection VHS and LaserDisc and the 2002 Greatest Hits DVD.

There are two other official versions of the music video. The "Original Version" begins with bloopers from the video shoot and features scenes of Minogue in an artist's studio rather than a photoshoot, wearing a skin-tight red T-shirt dress with a pin bearing the work "amour". It then eventually features Minogue on a carousel that apparently "hadn't been oiled since Kylie was born". The "Location Only" version, introduced on the 1992 Greatest Hits VHS and LaserDisc, is again a different edit with only the outdoor shots. Both versions were made available as extras on the 2002 Greatest Hits DVD. The video edit featured on the 2004 Ultimate Kylie DVD combines the first half and blooper ending of the director's cut with most of the second half of the "Location Only" version for unknown reasons.

== Critical reception ==
When reviewing the new singles, Chris Twomey of Record Mirror predicted the commercial success of "Got to Be Certain", noting that "[Minogue's] song (for want of a more accurate term) proves that they're still churning'em out relentlessly down at the SAW factory". Richard Lowe of Smash Hits elected "Got to Be Certain" as the "single of the fortnight", and while acknowledging that the track, as every SAW single, would be very diversely appreciated among the people, deemed that the half of them "will consider the rather-goodness of the tune" and predicted its "quite right" success on the charts. In 2019, James Masterton wrote that "Got to Be Certain" was "a gentler and perhaps easier on the ear pop record" than "I Should Be So Lucky", although it remains most forgetten. In 2023, Robert Moran of Australian daily tabloid newspaper The Sydney Morning Herald ranked the song as Minogue's 53rd best song (out of 183), describing it "a swinging singalong track".

== Chart performance ==
On 2 May 1988, "Got to Be Certain" was released in the United Kingdom. The song became Minogue's second top twenty hit when it debuted at number fifteen on the singles chart before climbing the chart in the weeks that followed, peaking at number two and remaining there for three weeks. It eventually sold 315,000 copies. Outside of the UK, the song was also widely successful. The single sold 17,227 copies in Sweden at the time. In New Zealand, it peaked at number two and stayed in the charts for 14 weeks, making it her most successful single in the country at that time. In Australia, "Got to Be Certain" was released on 7-inch and 12-inch vinyl on 20 June 1988, cassette single on 11 July 1988, and the remix 12" was released on 25 July 1988. It became the first single ever to debut on the Australian singles chart (ARIA) at number one, remaining in the top spot for three weeks from 4 July 1988. Additionally, it became Minogue's third consecutive release to reach number-one in the country.

== Live performances ==
"Got to Be Certain" was also performed at many of Minogue's concert tours, including the Enjoy Yourself Tour, Showgirl: The Greatest Hits Tour and The Homecoming Tour. The song was performed at her Anti Tour in 2012, at her Kiss Me Once Tour in 2014 and on Minogue's one-off show The Kylie Show. Minogue performed the song on her Aphrodite: Les Folies Tour.

== Formats and track listings ==
CD single

1. "Got to Be Certain" (Extended Mix) – 6:36
2. "I Should Be So Lucky" (Extended Mix) – 6:08
3. "Got to Be Certain" (Out for a Duck, Bill, Platter Plus Dub Mix – Instrumental) – 3:17

7-inch vinyl single

1. "Got to Be Certain" – 3:17
2. "Got to Be Certain" (Out for a Duck, Bill, Platter Plus Dub Mix – Instrumental) – 3:17

12-inch vinyl single

1. "Got to Be Certain" (Extended Mix) – 6:36
2. "Got to Be Certain" (Out for a Duck, Bill, Platter Plus Dub Mix – Instrumental) – 3:17
3. "Got to Be Certain" – 3:17

12-inch remix

1. "Got to Be Certain" (Ashes to Ashes – The Extra Beat Boys remix) – 6:52
2. "Got to Be Certain" (Out for a Duck, Bill, Platter Plus Dub Mix – Instrumental) – 3:17
3. "Got to Be Certain" – 3:17

iTunes digital EP – Remixes (2009)

1. "Got to Be Certain" - 3:20
2. "Got to Be Certain" (Extended Mix) - 6:37
3. "Got to Be Certain" (Ashes to Ashes – The Extra Beat Boys remix) - 6:52
4. "Got to Be Certain" (Out for a Duck, Bill, Platter Plus Dub Mix – Instrumental) - 3:20
5. "Got to Be Certain" (backing track) - 3:20
6. "Love at First Sight" (1988 version) (instrumental) - 3:12
7. "Love at First Sight" (1988 version) (backing track) - 3:12

== Charts ==
=== Charts ===
1988 weekly chart performance for "Got to Be Certain"
Chart (1988)	Peak position
Australia (ARIA)	1
Belgium (Ultratop 50 Flanders)	17
Denmark (Tracklisten)	6
Denmark (IFPI)	7
Europe (European Hot 100 Singles)	2
Europe (European Airplay Top 50)	3
Finland (IFPI)	1
France (SNEP)	9
Ireland (IRMA)	4
Luxembourg (Radio Luxembourg)	2
Netherlands (Single Top 100)	40
New Zealand (Recorded Music NZ)	2
Norway (VG-lista)	6
South Africa (Springbok Radio)	6
Sweden (Sverigetopplistan)	19
Switzerland (Schweizer Hitparade)	8
UK Singles (Official Charts)	2
UK Dance (Music Week)	1
West Germany (GfK)	6

=== Year-end charts ===
1988 year-end chart performance for "Got to Be Certain"
Chart (1988)	Position
Australia (ARIA)	18
Europe (European Hot 100 Singles)	39
New Zealand (RIANZ)	21
UK Singles (OCC)	21
West Germany (Media Control)	59

== Certifications and sales ==
Certifications for "Got to Be Certain"
Region	Certification	Certified units/sales
Australia (ARIA)	Gold	35,000^{^}
France (SNEP)	Silver	250,000^{*}
United Kingdom (BPI)	Silver	315,000
^{*} Sales figures based on certification alone.^{^} Shipments figures based on certification alone.
