= Step Back in Time: The Definitive Collection =

2019 album by Kylie Minogue

Greatest hits album by Kylie Minogue
- Released: 28 June 2019
- Recorded: 1987–2019
- Genres: Pop; dance-pop; nu-disco
- Length: 149:12 (CD version); 70:55 (vinyl version)
- Labels: BMG; Parlophone
- Producers: Sky Adams; Babydaddy; David Ball; Brothers in Rhythm; Dan Carey; Guy Chambers; Tony Cohen; Ian Curnow; Cutfather; Daniel Davidsen; Rob Davis; Cathy Dennis; DJ Fresh; DNA; Johnny Douglas; Jim Eliot; Freemasons; Julian Gallagher; Phil Harding; Calvin Harris; Paul Harris; Jimmy Harry; Kish Mauve; Greg Kurstin; Kylie Minogue; Steve Power; Stuart Price; Matt Schwartz; Lucas Secon; Damon Sharpe; Jake Shears; Mike Spencer; Graham Stack; Stock Aitken Waterman; Richard Stannard; Sunnyroads; Mark Taylor; Emilíana Torrini; Victor Van Vugt; Ingo Vauk; Peter Wallevik

Kylie Minogue chronology
Golden (2018)	Step Back in Time: The Definitive Collection (2019)	Golden Live in Concert (2019)

Singles from Step Back in Time: The Definitive Collection
- 1. "New York City" Released: 3 May 2019

Step Back in Time: The Definitive Collection is a greatest hits album by Australian singer Kylie Minogue. It was released on various formats on 28 June 2019 by BMG, serving as her first compilation with the label. Minogue confirmed the record in May 2019, after teasing initial content on social media and her website. The album's original content includes forty-two songs, dating back to Minogue's debut with PWL in 1987. In addition, an expanded version included another disc with eight additional tracks from her catalogue, as well as a megamix of various tracks from her career.

Step Back in Time: The Definitive Collection received positive reviews from music critics, who praised Minogue's extensive catalogue, with minor criticism directed at omitted content and packaging. The album was a commercial success, debuting at number one in both Australia and the United Kingdom, where it was certified platinum in the latter. The record also reached the top ten in Spain, Belgium, and Switzerland, as well as component charts in the United States. Minogue promoted the album with the single "New York City" and embarked on a tour in mid-2019 throughout Europe, the Middle East, and South America.

== Background and content ==
In late April 2019, Minogue began hinting at a forthcoming greatest hits release by sharing footage from the music video for "Step Back in Time" on social media. A countdown subsequently appeared on her official website, initially set to end on 3 May but concluding one day early. When the countdown ended, the site displayed the album's slogan, “Pop Precision Since 1987”. Minogue formally announced the compilation, Step Back in Time: The Definitive Collection, the same day, with pre-orders made available immediately.

The release was designed to coincide with Minogue’s 30th career anniversary and her scheduled appearances at the Glastonbury Festival, Brighton Pride, and other summer events. It is her fifth greatest hits compilation, following Greatest Hits (1992), Hits + (2000), Ultimate Kylie (2004), and The Best of Kylie Minogue (2012). (Note: Sources:) Its title is derived from her 1990 single of the same name and marks her first compilation with BMG Rights Management.

The album features forty-two tracks spanning Minogue’s career since 1987, arranged in a non-chronological order. The first disc includes an unreleased recording, "New York City", originally produced during the sessions for her fourteenth studio album, Golden (2018). On the deluxe edition, the track "Breathe" appears on disc one between "2 Hearts" and "Red Blooded Woman", while “New York City” is included as a hidden final track on disc two. This sequencing is retained on the cassette and digital editions, with the exception of “New York City”.

Several tracks from Minogue's catalogue were omitted from the original version, prompting criticism. In response, a third disc was issued featuring eight additional songs and a megamix running more than forty minutes.

== Release ==
Step Back in Time: The Definitive Collection was released on various formats on 28 June 2019 by BMG Rights Management. The album was released in two standard formats: digipack and 32-page hardcover book, both of which included two discs containing the album's material. Three vinyl sets were released in various colours: black, mint, and picture disc. All vinyl formats contain only twenty of the original album's forty-two tracks, but each copy also included a digital copy. Five two-set cassette tapes were also released in various colours, including clear, gold, green, pink, and white. In November, BMG added additional content to the album; the expanded version was released as a three-disc digipak and digitally on Minogue's website.

== Critical reception ==
Professional ratings
Review scores
Source	Rating
AllMusic	4/5 stars
Classic Pop Magazine	8/10
Spectrum Culture	4/5 stars
The Yorkshire Times	4/5 stars

Step Back in Time: The Definitive Collection garnered positive reviews from music critics. Tim Sendra of AllMusic gave the greatest hits album four stars, calling it a "fitting tribute" in time for Minogue's 30th career anniversary. Sendra described it as "truly definitive and essential" and concluded by saying "This collection shows just how often that happened, especially after she was able to gain control of her own career." Graham Clark of The Yorkshire Times also awarded the album four stars, stating "In the fickle world of pop Kylie is still there at the top." Mick Jacobs of Spectrum Culture praised the compilation's overall versatility, describing Minogue's dance songs and downtempo moments as having "enduring appeal". Jacobs went on to say, "Step Back in Time stands as a strong reminder of not just how prolific her career has been but also how much more of it we can expect."

However, other critics noted the lack of new material and omitted singles. Classic Pop magazine gave it an 8 out of 10 rating and described it as a "nifty guide to one of the great modern pop careers". However, the reviewer felt it "isn't perfect" or "definitive". Pip Ellwood-Hughes, writing for Entertainment Focus, praised how the album's release "will most likely build on the current wave of love for Kylie that's sweeping the UK". Ellwood-Hughes, on the other hand, called the album's packaging a "disappointment" and concluded that "those of us who've been with her since the start might feel just that little bit underwhelmed with the lack of added extras". Quentin Harrison of Albumism wrote an article echoing similar sentiments about the lack of certain tracks on Step Back in Time, stating that Minogue's singles "Finer Feelings", "Where Is the Feeling?", "Some Kind of Bliss", "Flower", and "Into the Blue" should have been included on the album's original release.

== Commercial performance ==
Step Back in Time: The Definitive Collection was a commercial success. It debuted at number one in Australia, becoming her sixth album to do so, and remained on the regional chart for four weeks. It also reached number one on the Australian Albums Chart and Vinyl Albums Chart, making Minogue the first artist to top all three charts simultaneously. In New Zealand, the album spent one week at number 27 on the regional chart. In Ireland, it debuted at number four on the Irish Albums Chart, the week's highest entry.

In the United Kingdom, Step Back in Time: The Definitive Collection debuted at number one on the UK Albums Chart, becoming Minogue's seventh number one there. Furthermore, it debuted at number one on the UK Vinyl Chart and was the best-selling cassette that week. Music Week reported that all formats sold 31,980 album-equivalent units in the region, with 25,992 of those units from physical sales, including 5,682 vinyl copies. The album spent a total of twenty weeks on the charts and was certified gold by the British Phonographic Industry (BPI) for shipments of 100,000 units in the country.

In Spain, the album debuted at number five on the Spanish Albums Chart and spent a total of 12 weeks there. Furthermore, it reached number nine in both Belgium (Flanders) and Switzerland (Romandy). It reached the top twenty in Switzerland and Germany, as well as the top forty in Austria, Hungary, the Czech Republic, the Netherlands, Italy, and Portugal. Elsewhere, the album peaked at number 41 in Poland, and 45 in France. In the United States, the album reached number six on the Independent Albums chart, 32 on the Top Album Sales chart, and 23 on the Top Tastemaker Albums chart.

== Promotion ==
The promotion for Step Back in Time: The Definitive Collection began with the release of the stand-alone single "New York City". The song was first added to Minogue's Golden Tour setlist and, due to popular demand, was announced to be included on the compilation. It debuted as a digital single on 3 May 2019, and was featured on The Zoe Ball Breakfast Show on BBC Radio 2 and The Graham Norton Show the same day. Six days later, Minogue's YouTube channel released a music video of the track featuring footage from her Golden Tour.

Minogue went on tour in mid-2019 to promote the album. The show was announced during the European leg of her Golden Tour, and additional dates were added to coincide with Minogue's appearance at the Glastonbury Festival 2019. The show received positive reviews from publications, and her performance at Glastonbury received unanimous acclaim. Minogue's Glastonbury performance was the highest-rated show in history, with 3.9 million viewers. Minogue also toured Europe, including stops in the United Arab Emirates and Brazil.

== Track listing ==
Disc one track listing
No.	Title	Writer(s)	Original album	Length
1.	"Can't Get You Out of My Head"	Cathy Dennis; Rob Davis	Fever (2001)	3:50
2.	"Spinning Around"	Kara DioGuardi; Paula Abdul; Ira Shickman; Osborne Bingham	Light Years (2000)	3:27
3.	"Love at First Sight"	Kylie Minogue; Richard Stannard; Ash Howes; Julian Gallagher; Martin Harrington	Fever	3:58
4.	"Dancing"	Minogue; Steve McEwan; Nathan Chapman	Golden (2018)	2:58
5.	"In Your Eyes"	Minogue; Stannard; Howes; Gallagher	Fever	3:17
6.	"Slow"	Minogue; Emilíana Torrini; Dan Carey	Body Language (2003)	3:13
7.	"All the Lovers"	Jim Eliot; Mima Stilwell	Aphrodite (2010)	3:20
8.	"I Believe in You"	Minogue; Jake Shears; Scott Hoffman	Ultimate Kylie (2004)	3:20
9.	"In My Arms"	Minogue; Calvin Harris; Paul Harris; Stannard; Julian Peake	X (2007)	3:31
10.	"On a Night Like This"	Graham Stack; Mark Taylor; Brian Rawling; Steve Torch	Light Years	3:32
11.	"Your Disco Needs You"	Minogue; Robbie Williams; Guy Chambers	Light Years	3:32
12.	"Please Stay"	Minogue; Stannard; Gallagher; John Themis	Light Years	4:05
13.	"2 Hearts"	Eliot; Stilwell	X	2:53
14.	"Red Blooded Woman"	Johnny Douglas; Karen Poole	Body Language	4:20
15.	"The One"	Minogue; Stannard; James Wiltshire; Russell Small; John Andersson; Johan Emmoth; Emma Holmgren	X	4:04
16.	"Come into My World"	Dennis; Davis	Fever	4:06
17.	"Wow"	Minogue; Poole; Greg Kurstin	X	3:12
18.	"Get Outta My Way"	Mich Hansen; Lucas Secon; Damon Sharpe; Peter Wallevik; Daniel Davidsen	Aphrodite	3:39
19.	"Timebomb"	Poole; Matt Schwartz; P. Harris	-	2:57
20.	"Kids" (with Robbie Williams)	Williams; Chambers	Light Years	4:20
21.	"Stop Me from Falling"	Minogue; McEwan; Adams; Danny Shah	Golden	3:01
22.	"New York City"	Minogue; Daniel Stein; Poole; Myles MacInnes	Previously unreleased	3:20
Total length:				77:55

Disc two track listing
No.	Title	Writer(s)	Original album	Length
1.	"Step Back in Time"	Mike Stock; Matt Aitken; Pete Waterman	Rhythm of Love (1990)	3:05
2.	"Better the Devil You Know"	Stock; Aitken; Waterman	Rhythm of Love	3:52
3.	"Hand on Your Heart"	Stock; Aitken; Waterman	Enjoy Yourself (1989)	3:50
4.	"Wouldn't Change a Thing"	Stock; Aitken; Waterman	Enjoy Yourself	3:12
5.	"Shocked"	Stock; Aitken; Waterman; Pauline Bennett	Rhythm of Love	3:08
6.	"Especially for You" (with Jason Donovan)	Stock; Aitken; Waterman	Enjoy Yourself	3:58
7.	"I Should Be So Lucky"	Stock; Aitken; Waterman	Kylie (1988)	3:22
8.	"Celebration"	Ronald Nathan Bell; Claydes Charles Smith; George Melvin Brown; James "J.T." Taylor; Robert Spike Mickens; Earl Eugene Toon Jr.; Dennis Ronald Thomas; Robert Earl Bell; Eumir Deodato	Greatest Hits (1992)	3:57
9.	"The Loco-Motion" (7" mix)	Carole King; Gerry Goffin	Kylie	3:13
10.	"Give Me Just a Little More Time"	Edythe Wayne; Ron Dunbar	Let's Get to It (1991)	3:06
11.	"Never Too Late"	Stock; Aitken; Waterman	Enjoy Yourself	3:20
12.	"Got to Be Certain"	Stock; Aitken; Waterman	Kylie	3:20
13.	"Tears on My Pillow"	Sylvester Bradford; Al Lewis	Enjoy Yourself	2:28
14.	"Je ne sais pas pourquoi"	Stock; Aitken; Waterman	Kylie	4:02
15.	"What Kind of Fool (Heard All That Before)"	Stock; Waterman; Minogue	Greatest Hits (1992)	3:44
16.	"What Do I Have to Do?"	Stock; Aitken; Waterman	Rhythm of Love	3:34
17.	"Confide in Me" (radio mix)	Steve Anderson; Dave Seaman; Edward Barton	Kylie Minogue (1994)	4:26
18.	"Breathe" (radio edit)	Minogue; Ingo Vauk; David Ball	Impossible Princess (1997)	3:40
19.	"Put Yourself in My Place" (radio mix)	Jimmy Harry	Kylie Minogue	4:13
20.	"Where the Wild Roses Grow" (with Nick Cave and the Bad Seeds)	Nick Cave	Murder Ballads (1996)	3:57
Total length:				71:17

Disc three (expanded edition) track listing
No.	Title	Writer(s)	Original album	Length
1.	"Into the Blue"	Kelly Sheehan; Mike Del Rio; Jacob Kasher Hindlin; Marco Lisboa	Kiss Me Once (2014)	4:10
2.	"I Was Gonna Cancel"	Pharrell Williams	Kiss Me Once	3:32
3.	"Chocolate" (radio edit)	Poole; Johnny Douglas	Body Language	4:02
4.	"Did It Again" (radio edit)	Minogue; Anderson; Seaman	Impossible Princess	3:45
5.	"Some Kind of Bliss" (radio edit)	James Dean Bradfield; Minogue; Sean Moore	Impossible Princess	3:34
6.	"Word Is Out"	Stock; Waterman	Let's Get to It	3:35
7.	"If You Were With Me Now"	Minogue; Stock; Waterman; Washington	Let's Get to It	3:10
8.	"It's No Secret"	Stock; Aitken; Waterman	Kylie	3:57

Disc three: F9 megamix track listing
No.	Title	Writer(s)	Length
9.	"Step Back in Time" (section)	Stock; Aitken; Waterman	0:18
10.	"I Should Be So Lucky"	Stock; Aitken; Waterman	2:08
11.	"What Do I Have to Do"	Stock; Aitken; Waterman	2:15
12.	"Hand on Your Heart"	Stock; Aitken; Waterman	2:30
13.	"Better the Devil You Know"	Stock; Aitken; Waterman	1:38
14.	"Shocked" (DNA mix)	Stock; Aitken; Waterman; Bennett	2:13
15.	"Step Back in Time"	Stock; Aitken; Waterman	2:21
16.	"Confide in Me"	Anderson; Seaman; Barton	2:21
17.	"On a Night Like This"	Stack; Taylor; Rawling; Torch	2:40
18.	"Your Disco Needs You"	Minogue; Williams; Chambers	3:31
19.	"Spinning Around"	DioGuardi; Abdul; Shickman; Bingham	2:24
20.	"Love at First Sight"	Minogue; Stannard; Howes; Gallagher; Harrington	2:52
21.	"Can't Get Blue Monday Out of My Head"	Dennis; Davis; Peter Hook; Bernard Sumner; Gillian Gilbert; Stephen Morris	3:46
22.	"The One" (instrumental)	Minogue; Stannard; Wiltshire; Small; Andersson; Emmoth; Holmgren	0:14
23.	"Slow" (acapella)	Minogue; Torrini; Carey	1:18
24.	"The One"	Minogue; Stannard; Wiltshire; Small; Andersson; Emmoth; Holmgren	1:34
25.	"All the Lovers"	Eliot; Stilwell	3:16
26.	"Dancing"	Minogue; McEwan; Chapman	3:00
Total length:			71:29

Vinyl edition track listing
No.	Title	Writer(s)	Original album	Length
1.	"Can't Get You Out of My Head"	Dennis; Davis	Fever	3:50
2.	"Spinning Around"	DioGuardi; Abdul; Shickman; Bingham	Light Years	3:27
3.	"Love at First Sight"	Minogue; Stannard; Howes; Gallagher; Harrington	Fever	3:58
4.	"In Your Eyes"	Minogue; Stannard; Howes; Gallagher	Fever	3:17
5.	"Slow"	Minogue; Torrini; Carey	Body Language	3:13
6.	"All the Lovers"	Eliot; Stilwell	Aphrodite	3:20
7.	"I Believe in You"	Minogue; Shears; Babydaddy	Ultimate Kylie	3:20
8.	"In My Arms"	Minogue; C.Harris; P.Harris]]; Stannard; Peake	X	3:31
9.	"On a Night Like This"	Stack; Taylor; Rawling; Torch	Light Years	3:32
10.	"Wow"	Minogue; Poole; Kurstin	X	3:12
11.	"Step Back in Time"	Stock; Aitken; Waterman	Rhythm of Love	3:05
12.	"Better the Devil You Know"	Stock; Aitken; Waterman	Rhythm of Love	3:52
13.	"Shocked" (DNA 7" mix)	Stock; Aitken; Waterman; Bennett	Rhythm of Love	3:08
14.	"I Should Be So Lucky"	Stock; Aitken; Waterman	Kylie	3:22
15.	"Especially for You" (with Jason Donovan)	Stock; Aitken; Waterman	Enjoy Yourself	3:58
16.	"Confide in Me" (radio mix)	Anderson; Seaman; Barton	Kylie Minogue	4:26
17.	"Put Yourself in My Place" (radio mix)	Harry	Kylie Minogue	4:13
18.	"2 Hearts"	Eliot; Stilwell	X	2:53
19.	"Kids" (with Robbie Williams)	Williams; Chambers	Light Years	4:20
20.	"Dancing"	Minogue; McEwan; Chapman	Golden	2:58

== Personnel ==
- Kylie Minogue – artist
- Tony Huang – album artwork concept
- Xevi Muntane – photography
- F9 – megamix producer

== Charts ==
=== Weekly charts ===
Weekly chart performance for Step Back in Time: The Definitive Collection
Chart (2019)	Peak position
Australian Albums (ARIA)	1
Austrian Albums (Ö3 Austria)	21
Belgian Albums (Ultratop Flanders)	9
Belgian Albums (Ultratop Wallonia)	25
Czech Albums (ČNS IFPI)	22
Dutch Albums (Album Top 100)	23
French Albums (SNEP)	45
German Albums (Offizielle Top 100)	15
Hungarian Albums (MAHASZ)	21
Irish Albums (IRMA)	4
Italian Albums (FIMI)	32
New Zealand Albums (RMNZ)	27
Polish Albums (ZPAV)	41
Portuguese Albums (AFP)	40
Scottish Albums (Official Charts)	1
Spanish Albums (Promusicae)	5
Swiss Albums (Schweizer Hitparade)	11
Swiss Albums (Romandy)	9
UK Albums (Official Charts)	1
US Independent Albums (Billboard)	6
US Top Album Sales (Billboard)	32
US Indie Store Album Sales (Billboard)	23

=== Year-end charts ===
Year-end chart performance for Step Back in Time: The Definitive Collection
Chart (2019)	Position
UK Albums (OCC)	51

== Certifications ==
Certifications for Step Back in Time: The Definitive Collection
Region	Certification	Certified units/sales
United Kingdom (BPI)	Platinum	300,000

== Release history ==
Release history and formats for Step Back in Time: The Definitive Collection
Region	Date	Format(s)	Edition	Label	Ref.
Various	28 June 2019	CD; digital download; LP; cassette; streaming	Standard; Deluxe	BMG; Parlophone	
Various	22 November 2019	CD; digital download; streaming	Expanded	BMG; Parlophone	

== See also ==
- List of number-one albums of 2019 (Australia)
- List of UK Albums Chart number ones of 2019
