= Rhythm of Love (Kylie Minogue album) =

1990 studio album by Kylie Minogue

Studio album by Kylie Minogue
- Released: 12 November 1990
- Recorded: March–September 1990
- Studios: PWL (London); Trax (Los Angeles); Ultimo (Los Angeles); Ground Control (Los Angeles); Scotland Yard (Los Angeles); Larrabee Sound (Los Angeles); Saturn Sound (Los Angeles)
- Genre: Dance-pop
- Length: 44:20
- Labels: Mushroom; PWL
- Producers: Stock Aitken Waterman; Keith Cohen; Stephen Bray; Michael Jay

Kylie Minogue chronology
Enjoy Yourself (1989)	Rhythm of Love (1990)	Let's Get to It (1991)

Singles from Rhythm of Love
- 1. "Better the Devil You Know" Released: 30 April 1990; 2. "Step Back in Time" Released: 22 October 1990; 3. "What Do I Have to Do" Released: 21 January 1991; 4. "Shocked" Released: 20 May 1991

Rhythm of Love is the third studio album by Australian singer Kylie Minogue. It was released in the United Kingdom on 12 November 1990 by Pete Waterman Limited (PWL) and in Australia on 3 December 1990 by Mushroom Records. Recording sessions took place in London and Los Angeles during early-to-mid 1990. Minogue started to become more involved in the writing and production of the album; she was credited as co-writer for the first time, while Stock Aitken Waterman (SAW) were the primary producers along with new producers and collaborations, including Keith Cohen, Stephen Bray and Michael Jay.

Rhythm of Love is a musical departure from Minogue's earlier bubblegum pop records, and has a more sexually liberated image and dance-influenced sound. It received generally positive reviews from music critics, being complimented as her best work with SAW. The album was not as commercially successful as Minogue's previous albums, becoming her first studio album not to reach number one in the UK, reaching number nine on the UK Albums Chart. In Australia, it was Minogue's third top 10 studio album, peaking at number 10, while also attaining top 20 positions in Ireland, France, and Spain.

Four accompanying singles were released – "Better the Devil You Know", "Step Back in Time", "What Do I Have to Do", and "Shocked" – all of which peaked inside the top 10 in the UK and Ireland, making Minogue the first artist to have their first 13 releases reach the top 10 in that region. Promotion for Rhythm of Love included controversial music videos and continued to associate Minogue with an increasingly provocative image. Minogue further promoted the album with her Rhythm of Love Tour, traveling to Australia and Asia. The album was re-issued in the UK in 2015, when it returned to the UK Albums Chart.

== Background ==
Kylie Minogue relocated to London after filming her final scenes for Neighbours between June and July 1988. She tried to steer her public image away from her character of Charlene Robinson, a schoolgirl-turned-garage mechanic whom Minogue felt was an exploitation of her career. In April 1989, Minogue accepted the lead role of Lola Lovell for that year's film The Delinquents. She believed the role of a rebellious, passionate country girl that suffers through an abortion during her teenage years and has several love scenes in the film would establish her as a serious actor. Principal photography of The Delinquents began in May 1989 and lasted about two months, coinciding with the recording of Minogue's second album Enjoy Yourself (1989). Released in late 1989, both the film and the album were commercially successful though received mixed reviews from critics, many of whom considered them as failed attempts to differentiate Minogue's girl-next-door image.

Minogue first met Michael Hutchence, lead singer of Australian rock band INXS, at the Countdown Awards ceremony in July 1987. They started a romantic affair in Hong Kong during September 1989, a few days before Minogue's first concert tour, Disco in Dream, kicked off. That December, Minogue broke up with her partner of three years and Neighbours co-star, Jason Donovan, over the telephone, and later attended the Australian premiere of The Delinquents with Hutchence; the couple's relationship attracted intense attention. Minogue also sang on "Do They Know It's Christmas?", an all-star ensemble charity single that was released to raise funds for famine relief in Ethiopia. Produced by Stock Aitken Waterman (SAW), the song was the Christmas number-one single on the UK Singles Chart and the ninth biggest-selling single of 1989 in the United Kingdom.

== Recording and production ==
=== Sessions with SAW ===
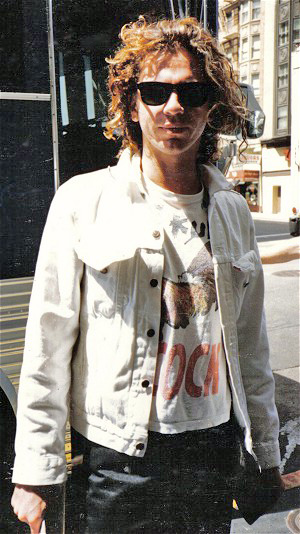
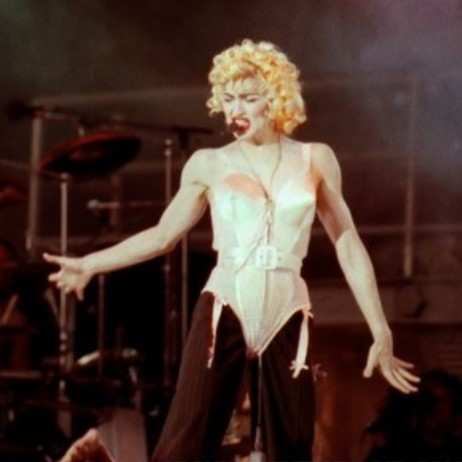
Rhythm of Love was influenced by Minogue's romantic relationship with Michael Hutchence, as well as Madonna's 1989 album Like a Prayer.

Dissatisfied with her limited creative input on her first two albums, Minogue strategised with her manager Terry Blamey and her Australian label Mushroom Records to force a change in her relationship with SAW. Pete Waterman deflected Kylie's request for writing input on her SAW-produced tracks by scheduling a writing session with PWL B-team Phil Harding and Ian Curnow, which produced the track "I Am the One for You", which remained unreleased for several years. With Kylie deciding to collaborate with US producers on the new record, this move pressured SAW into conceding the singer creative input, and they gave her veto on mixes, which she used.

Rhythm of Love was recorded in early-to-mid 1990. Minogue started recording for the album in March, after finishing the Australian leg of the Enjoy Yourself Tour. The first three songs recorded at the PWL Studios, London were "Better the Devil You Know", "What Do I Have To Do", and "Things Can Only Get Better"; the former song was recorded within three hours. Once the tour ended in May, she finished four other tracks with SAW in late July: "Step Back in Time", "Secrets", "Always Find the Time", and "Shocked". As alternative rock and techno entered the musical mainstream, SAW tried to adopt a more appropriate approach for the current music market,Matt Aitken stated they took many cues from techno music and felt "pure pop had run its course" at the time. Due to Pete Waterman's background as a disc jockey in gay clubs, Pete Waterman Limited (PWL) co-owner David Howells thought making more club-oriented songs for Minogue was unavoidable. Meanwhile, Stock was not familiar with club music and felt isolated in many respects. SAW also had to update their rhythm tracks to match the popular Roland TR-909 sound. "We struggled to make it sound more like what everybody else was doing at the time, but we got there in the end", said Aitken of creating the sound. The trio also acknowledged Minogue's evolving public image and discussed how to change the musical and lyrical emphasis for her next album. They decided to subtly move on from Minogue's previous material to avoid alienating her fans.

Hutchence was with Minogue during the sessions; he listened to the rough tapes and gave her advice about songwriting. "[Hutchence] really does help me and influence me a lot ... He encourages me to be myself and go for it", Minogue said of his input. During the production of Rhythm of Love, Minogue began to take more control over her workload. She came up with many visual ideas, and took inspiration from American singer Madonna and her fourth studio album Like a Prayer (1989).

=== Other collaborations ===
Before starting to work on Rhythm of Love, Minogue asked to record some of the tracks with producers other than SAW, which they accepted. According to Waterman, Minogue "was going to clubs, seeing different people, hearing different things ... I knew the artist was going to want to get involved". In March 1990, she went to Los Angeles to enlist the help of other producers. Sessions with Keith Cohen, Michael Jay, and Madonna's longtime collaborator Stephen Bray produced the tracks "The World Still Turns", "One Boy Girl", "Count the Days", and "Rhythm of Love"—all of which credited Minogue as co-writer for the first time. Minogue wanted to work with Jay upon hearing his work with American singer Martika; they collaborated on "The World Still Turns", Minogue's first co-written song from the LA sessions. Jay decided on an R&B-tinged ballad after being given a brief by MCA records to "give [Kylie] a hit in the United States", although he says he had to restrain himself from his personal wish to produce SAW-inspired pop. Jay says he felt he'd failed the mission to produce a US hit when he heard the final album, after realising the extreme quality of the SAW-produced singles, but acknowledges he was working to a very different brief than the UK production team.

Minogue wrote "One Boy Girl" with Willie Wilcox in August, who came up with the title. The original demo for the track featured a male rapper; Cohen later replaced him with verses by American female rapper the Poetess. Bray co-wrote "Rhythm of Love" and "Count the Days" with Minogue; while recording "Rhythm of Love", he had an idea for the chorus of "Count the Days", to which Minogue subsequently contributed her verses. She managed to finish the album by September. Minogue was proud of the songs she had written and felt Rhythm of Love was a more important project to her than her two previous albums. In Los Angeles, the sessions took place at Trax Recording, Ultimo, Ground Control Studio, Scotland Yard, Larrabee Sound, and Saturn Sound.

== Music and lyrics ==
Rhythm of Love is primarily a dance-pop album, marking a departure from the bubblegum pop music of Minogue's earlier work. It has a more dance-oriented production and instrumentation, which includes saxophone and guitar. Select's Andrew Harrison said most of the album "goose-steps to Stock Aitken Waterman's mercilessly mutated house beat". Marc Andrews from Smash Hits stated Rhythm of Love "is not as 'different' as it could have been", with the majority of the tracks being "familiar boompy-tee-boomp backbeat, swirling strings and relentless thumping drums". He also said the album is "pretty much a cracking pop outing" overall. Cameron Adams from the Herald Sun considered it the first album "that tried to inject some R&B" into Minogue's output. John Lyons of The Sydney Morning Herald wrote that the album features more "American sounds" like funk and rap.

"What Do I Have to Do"
The rave-infused "What Do I Have To Do" shows more mature lyrical content from Minogue.

The opening track, "Better the Devil You Know", is a dance-pop song with worldbeat influences, in which Minogue struggles with a lover's flaws. SAW wrote the song as a response to Minogue's departure from Neighbours and her over-publicised romantic relationships with Donovan and Hutchence. Joe Sweeney of PopMatters compared Minogue's delivery with that of Madonna. A disco song about the love of music, "Step Back in Time" is one of a few non-relationship-themed tracks by Minogue; it pays homage to 1970s disco music by referencing titles and catchphrases, and includes uncredited samples of Bobby Byrd's song "Hot Pants – I'm Coming, Coming, I'm Coming" (1972) and B. T. Express's song "Give Up the Funk (Let's Dance)" (1980). Adams described the track as "Motown meets Hi-NRG meets Studio 54" and said it may have laid the path for her disco-related material. The rave-infused track "What Do I Have To Do" features piano lines, whooshing noises, and built-in rushes. The song was compared with Madonna's "Vogue" (1990), Black Box's "Ride on Time" (1989), and Deee-Lite's "Groove is in the Heart" (1990). In the lyrics, Minogue tries to get a man to know how much she loves him with a more mature approach; the song includes lyrics such as "There ain't a single night / When I haven't held you tight / But it's always inside my head / Never inside my bed."

"Secrets" is similar to the earlier work of Olivia Newton-John and Minogue's previous studio album Enjoy Yourself (1989). It shows the singer's vulnerability towards her lover, with Minogue being scared that her secrets will force him to leave. She sings about falling in love on "Always Find The Time", a SAW-produced upbeat track with incidental cymbal crashes, and samples from Mary Jane Girls' 1983 single "Candy Man", written and composed by Rick James. Jeremy Mark of Number One noted that "The World Still Turns", the first song on Rhythm of Love co-written by Minogue, is "the only real attempt at a ballad on the album", although its pace is "not especially slow and smoochy". The song talks about moving on from a failed relationship. On the seventh track "Shocked", Minogue sings about being surprised to find herself deeply in love. Composer Mike Stock says the track was influenced by the writings of Virginia Woolf and is meant to be evocative of "a trip". The track has a sophisticated dance sound with electric guitars and a disco beat. "One Boy Girl" blends rhythmic new jack swing with house elements, and includes strong dance beats and a rap conversation between Minogue and the Poetess.

"Things Can Only Get Better" is a dance song influenced by the soundtrack to 1977 film Saturday Night Fever that has a message about striving to fulfil one's dreams. Harrison compared the song to New Order's "Vanishing Point" from their fifth studio album Technique (1989). An ode to long-distance relationships, Minogue co-wrote "Count the Days" with Bray and dedicated it to her relationship with Hutchence, saying: "It's obviously difficult for us to match up – we're both so busy". Ian Wade from Classic Pop said the "jaunty" pop song was strongly influenced by Madonna and that it "wouldn't have been out of place on True Blue". Mark found the merry tune of "Count the Days" is reminiscent of Madonna's "Everybody" (1983) and the early work of Paula Abdul. He called "Rhythm of Love", the title and closing track, "an exceedingly Madonna-esque affair" while Wade noted its similarities to Janet Jackson's "Rhythm Nation" (1989).

== Artwork and release ==
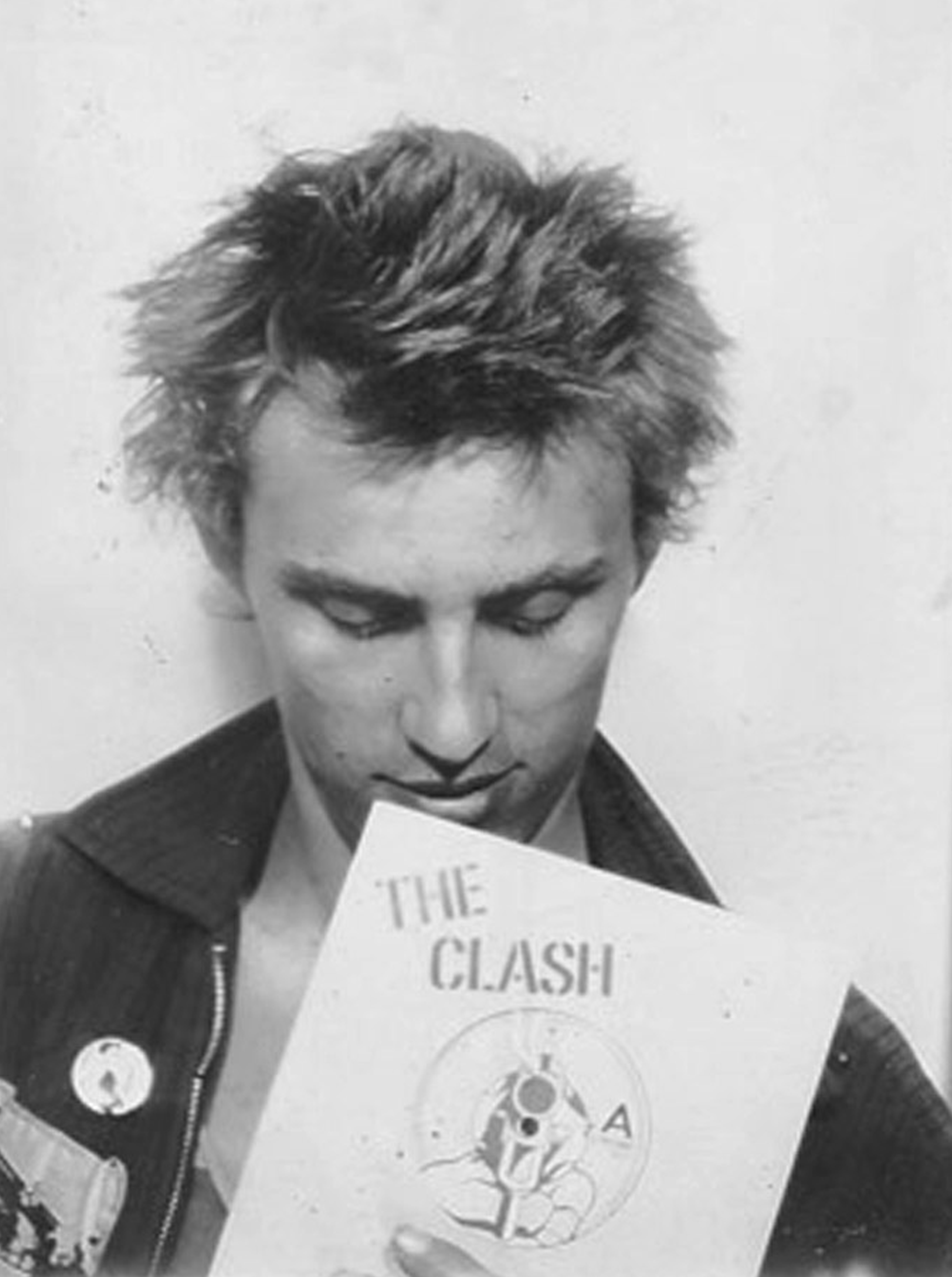
English artist Nick Egan (pictured in 2009) designed the album cover and directed the music video for "Step Back in Time".

The album's artwork was photographed by Austrian photographer Markus Morianz; it shows Minogue wearing a white, bare-midriff blouse and raising her hands behind her head. Christian Guiltenane of Classic Pop said the seductive pose offers "a freer —and, it was implied — more sexually liberated" nature than her earlier image. Writing for Idolator, Robbie Daw commented that the cover "[takes] a drastic turn for the sexy." English artist Nick Egan, who previously art-directed sleeves for Duran Duran and INXS, handled the design for Rhythm of Love with designer Eric Roinestad. The photograph session for Rhythm of Love took place within Los Angeles in October 1990; Minogue wore a small, cropped leotard with chains and a white, feather costume while standing in a desert. Minogue donated the bikini costume with boots worn in the photoshoot, which was designed by Azzedine Alaïa, to the Cultural Gifts Program of the Arts Centre Melbourne in 2004. A month before the album's UK release, photographs from the session were featured in a six-page spread for Smash Hits, in which Minogue said of her "dramatic" new image, "I've grown up. I'm more womanly!... I think the outrageous me has been kinda subdued for a long time and now it's coming out!"

Rhythm of Love was released in the UK on 12 November by PWL and in Australia on 3 December 1990 by Mushroom Records. Two special editions of Rhythm of Love were released in 1990 and 1991, with an Australasian Tour souvenir edition released in Australia to support the tour; it included three bonus tracks in a gold outer sleeve—the edition was later released in the UK and is commonly referred to as the Gold edition. Another edition in special packaging was exclusively released in Australia in 1990 to promote the single "Shocked". In Japan, the album was first released on 15 December 1990 by PWL. It was re-released twice by WEA in 1993 and 1995, while PWL reissued it in 2012 with bonus tracks and mixes. Kylie's Remixes: Vol. 2, an eleven-track compilation of remixed songs from Rhythm of Love and Let's Get to It (1991), Minogue's fourth studio album, was released across Japan in July 1992. The compilation album peaked at number 90 on the Oricon Albums Chart and has sold 7,330 copies, as of 2006. Kylie's Remixes: Vol. 2 was released in Australia in 1993.

On 9 February 2015, Rhythm of Love, along with Enjoy Yourself, Let's Get to It, and Minogue's debut studio album Kylie (1988), were re-released by Cherry Red Records and PWL. The albums were digitally remastered from the original studio tapes and were made available on vinyl, CD, and DVD. "I Am the One for You", which was written by Minogue, Phil Harding and Ian Curnow, was an unused track from recording sessions before ultimately being released on Minogue's Australia-only compilation album Greatest Remix Hits 4 (1998).

== Promotion ==
Minogue failed to find an audience in the United States following the release of Enjoy Yourself, and Geffen Records dropped her as an artist. Subsequently, MCA Records refused to distribute Rhythm of Love and cancelled plans to release "Better The Devil You Know" on the soundtrack of a new US film. The single "Shocked" and its music video were deemed unsuitable for the market.

=== Rhythm of Love Tour ===
Rhythm of Love Tour
- Tour by Kylie Minogue
- Location: Oceania; Asia
- Associated album: Rhythm of Love
- Start date: 10 February 1991
- End date: 10 March 1991
- Legs: 2
- No. of shows: 19

Kylie Minogue concert chronology
- Enjoy Yourself Tour (1990); Rhythm of Love Tour (1991); Let's Get to It Tour (1991)

In Australia and Asia, Minogue promoted the album with her Rhythm of Love Tour, which was sponsored by Coca-Cola, from February to March 1991. Her provocative dance moves and choice of costumes—PVC mini-dresses and skin-tight body suits—drew strong reactions from critics, many of whom compared them to costumes worn by Madonna. Minogue said, "Madonna has definitely influenced me as have lots of people, men and women ... I am certainly not trying to imitate Madonna. I'm continuing to develop my own style." Four costume pieces worn for the tour were also sent to the Arts Centre Melbourne in 2004 by Minogue.

Setlist

1. "Step Back in Time"
2. "Wouldn't Change a Thing"
3. "Got to Be Certain"
4. "Always Find The Time"
5. "Enjoy Yourself"
6. "Tears on My Pillow"
7. "Secrets"
8. "Help!"
9. "I Should Be So Lucky"
10. "What Do I Have to Do"
11. "Je ne sais pas pourquoi"
12. "One Boy Girl"
13. "Love Train"
14. "Rhythm of Love"
15. "Shocked"
16. "Hand on Your Heart"
17. "Count the Days"
18. "The Loco-Motion"
19. "Better the Devil You Know"

Tour dates

List of 1991 concerts, showing date, city, country, and venue
Date (1991)	City	Country	Venue
10 February	Canberra	Australia	National Indoor Sports Centre
13 February	Perth	Australia	Perth Entertainment Centre
15 February	Adelaide	Australia	Memorial Drive Park
16 February	Melbourne	Australia	National Tennis Centre
17 February	Euroa	Australia	Seven Creeks Run Amphitheatre
19 February	Melbourne	Australia	National Tennis Centre
20 February	Newcastle	Australia	Civic Theatre
22 February	Brisbane	Australia	Brisbane Entertainment Centre
23 February	Sydney	Australia	Sydney Entertainment Centre
24 February	Sydney	Australia	Sydney Entertainment Centre
26 February	Sydney	Australia	Sydney Entertainment Centre
27 February	Sydney	Australia	Sydney Entertainment Centre
1 March	Singapore		Harbour Pavilion
2 March	Bangkok	Thailand	Thailand Cultural Centre
3 March	Kuala Lumpur	Malaysia	Stadium Negara
4 March	Tokyo	Japan	Tokyo Bay NK Hall
6 March	Osaka	Japan	Osaka-jō Hall
8 March	Nagoya	Japan	Nagoya Rainbow Hall
10 March	Fukuoka	Japan	Fukuoka Kokusai Center

=== Singles ===
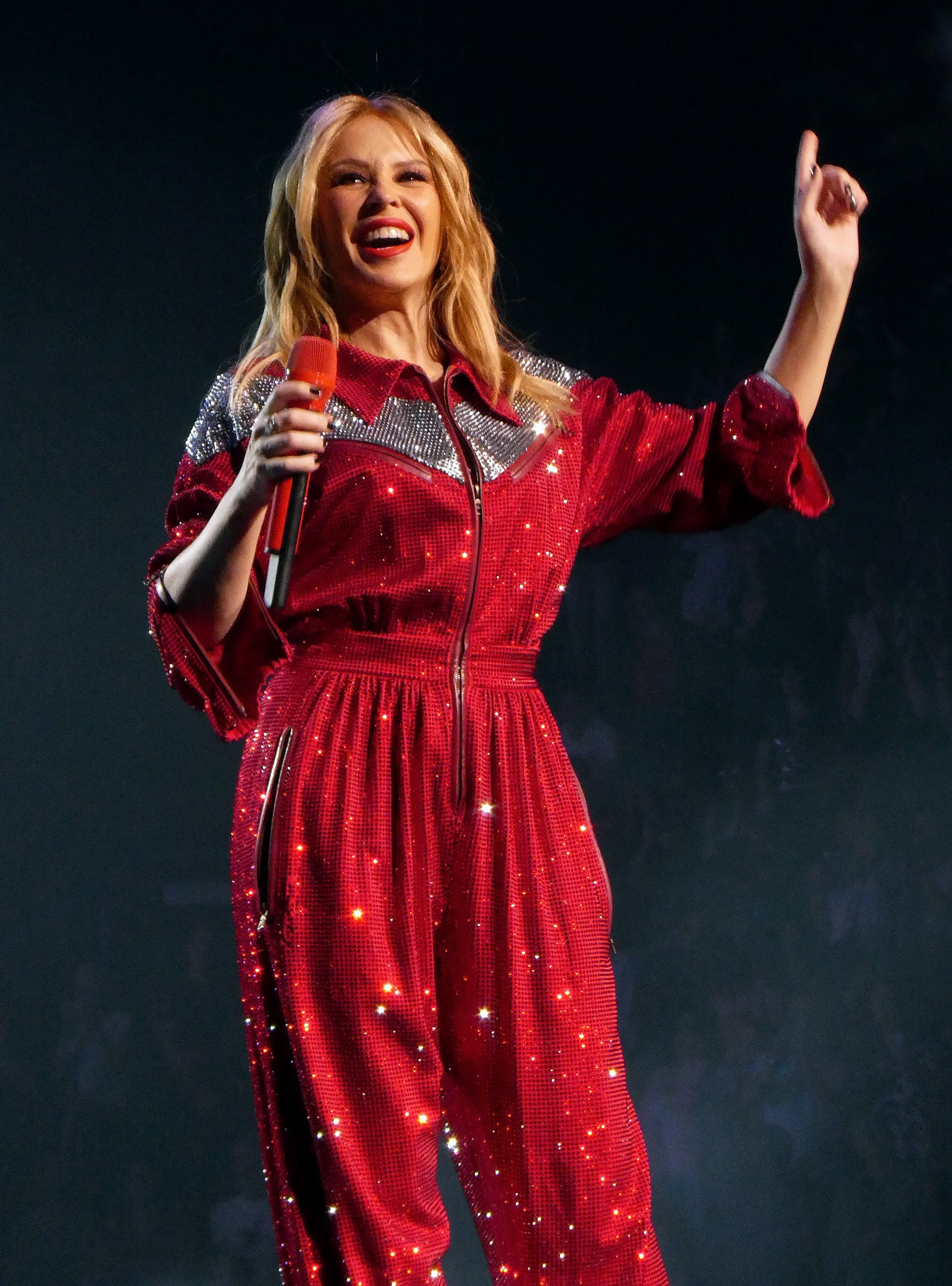
Minogue performing lead single "Better the Devil You Know" on 2025's Tension Tour

The album spawned four singles. The lead single, "Better the Devil You Know", was released on 30 April 1990. An accompanying music video was directed by Paul Goldman and was filmed in Melbourne — away from the constraints of PWL — over two days in early April of that year. The video's sexual tone caused controversy — it featured Minogue dancing in a revealing black dress and posing suggestive scenes with a shirtless black man. In the UK, "Better the Devil You Know" became her fifth number two single on the UK Singles Chart, and stayed at the position for two weeks. It further peaked within the top five in Australia, Belgium, and Ireland.

"Step Back in Time" was released on 22 October 1990 as the album's second single. It debuted at number eight on the Australian Singles Chart, before peaking at number five the following week. The song experienced similar performance on the UK Singles Chart, where it debuted at number nine and peaked at number four the following week. "Step Back in Time" became Minogue's second consecutive single to peak at number four on the Irish Singles Chart. The song's music video was directed by Egan in Los Angeles a month before the single's release; this marked her first video to be filmed in the US. Minogue paid homage to 1960s and 1970s culture in the video, which opens with Minogue putting an 8-track tape into a stereo, and continues with clips of her and back-up dancers dancing near a large cityscape while wearing colourful clothing. Minogue and the dancers are also drive through Los Angeles in a red Cadillac car.

Originally planned to be the follow-up single to "Better the Devil You Know", a remix of "What Do I Have to Do" was released on 21 January 1991 as the third single from Rhythm of Love. An accompanying music video that is set mostly in black-and-white was directed by Dave Hogan in London during December 1990. In the video, Minogue appears in a variety of film star looks, irons clothes while wearing a French maid costume, and shows a tattoo of a black panther on her back. Kylie's sister Dannii Minogue appears in the video as a cameo to silence tabloid rumours about a feud between the two of them. Model Zane O'Connell, who later became Kylie's boyfriend, also had a cameo role in the music video. The video's sexual undertones were too much for Saturday morning television shows in the UK, with the programmes airing a censored version of it. The single was Minogue's first to miss the top 10 in Australia, where it peaked at number 11; the song also broke her run of top-five singles in the UK, where it peaked at number six. The song also peaked at number six in Ireland, becoming Minogue's third top 10 single from Rhythm of Love in the region.

English producers DNA asked to remix "Shocked", which was released as the fourth and final single from the album on 20 May 1991. The remix includes a rap during the bridge that was written and performed by Jazzi P. The song's music video, which was also directed by Hogan, was filmed at the Pinewood Studios, Iver Health, on 24 and 25 April 1991. In the video, Minogue kisses a man in the back of a car, which arrived at a mansion. Jazzi P raps through a keyhole and O'Connell again appears as Minogue's lover. "Shocked" peaked at number six on the UK Singles Chart, making Minogue the first artist to have their first 13 releases chart inside the top 10. It peaked at number two in Ireland and at number seven in Australia.

== Critical reception ==
Professional ratings
Review scores
Source	Rating
AllMusic	3/5 stars
Digital Spy	4/5 stars
Encyclopedia of Popular Music	4/5 stars
PopMatters	7/10 stars
Select	2/5 medals
Smash Hits	8/10 stars

Rhythm of Love was met with generally positive reviews from music critics, being complimented as her best work with SAW. Chris True of AllMusic considered it to be a more accomplished album than either of Minogue's previous two releases, benefitting from the songwriting, production, and her confident vocals. Writing for Digital Spy, Nick Levine labelled the album as Minogue's best work despite its unevenness towards the end. Mark was impressed by the album's catchy and memorable material, praising "Step Back in Time" and "Better the Devil You Know" as two of the singer's finest singles.

Sweeney said the album is superior than Minogue's first releases by letting her charisma and vocal shine. He commended the producers for "[taking] a big step in the right direction". By contrast, Harrison criticised her collaborations with other producers as useless but noted there were steps to "reposition [Minogue] in the teen pop queen market". It was one of three of Minogue's studio albums to receive a four-star rating from British writer Colin Larkin in the Encyclopedia of Popular Music (2011) beside Light Years (2000) and Fever (2001), with him classifying it as "high standard".

In retrospect, Rhythm of Love is considered to be a turning point in Minogue's career. Ian Wade and Oliver Hurley from Classic Pop wrote the album flexes her compositional skills and hailed it "an underrated classic that richly deserves its due". In 2018, Sal Cinquemani of Slant Magazine selected the album as Minogue's strongest during the PWL era due to the choice of singles, and said the producers put Minogue "somewhere near, if not in, the same league as her female chart rivals for the first time". Ernest Macias from Entertainment Weekly said in 2018 that the album showcases Minogue, for the first time, as a "pop icon, propelled by her angelic vocals, sensual music videos, chic fashion, and distinct dance sound". Similarly, while reviewing the album on its 30th anniversary, Albumism's Quentin Harrison deemed it a "vibrant and colorful portrait of a young woman just starting to discover her creative voice", as well as a major advancement for her sound and look.

== Commercial performance ==
Although Rhythm of Love was not as commercially successful as Minogue's previous albums, it was still a success nonetheless. It debuted and peaked at number nine on the UK Albums Chart, becoming her third consecutive top 10 entry on the chart and her first studio album that did not reach number one. The album fell to number 16 the following week, and stayed in the top 20 for five weeks. In June 1991, Rhythm of Love re-entered the chart at number 62 and stayed on the chart for three more weeks. The album was certified gold by the British Phonographic Industry (BPI) on 6 December 1990 for selling 100,000 copies in the UK. Rhythm of Love has sold over 300,000 copies in the UK by March 1991; Tilly Rutherfold, general manager of PWL, said that the number "did not come up to expectations" from her previous releases, but her then-manager Terry Blamey described the album as a big success that "made PWL a lot of money". In 2015, the reissue of Rhythm of Love peaked at number 86 on the UK Albums Chart on 15 February. In Ireland, it peaked at number two on the album chart on the Irish Albums chart for 28 October 1990, according to Music & Media.

In Australia, Rhythm of Love debuted at number 17 on the ARIA Albums chart, and reached number 13 the following week but later fell down the chart. When Minogue was promoting the album with her Rhythm of Love Tour, it peaked at number 10 on the ARIA Albums chart in the week of 10 March 1991, becoming her third top 10 studio album four months after being released. Later that year, Rhythm of Love was certified platinum by the Australian Recording Industry Association (ARIA) for selling 70,000 copies in Australia. In New Zealand, the album spent one week on the NZ Top 40 Albums chart at number 36. It performed similarly in Sweden, peaking at number 44 on Sverigetopplistan's album chart. In Spain, Rhythm of Love reached number 26 and stayed on Promusicae's album chart for 10 weeks, and was later certified gold by the Productores de Música de España for selling 50,000 copies in Spain. In France, it peaked at number 25 and later became the 79th best-selling album of 1991. In Japan, the album peaked at number 32 on the Oricon Albums Chart and had sold 67,000 copies by 2006.

== Track listing ==
All songs written, produced and arranged by Mike Stock, Matt Aitken and Pete Waterman, except where noted.

Rhythm of Love track listing – Standard version
No.	Title	Writer(s)	Producer(s)	Length
1.	"Better the Devil You Know"			3:53
2.	"Step Back in Time"			3:04
3.	"What Do I Have to Do"			3:43
4.	"Secrets"			4:05
5.	"Always Find the Time"	Mike Stock; Matt Aitken; Pete Waterman; Rick James		3:35
6.	"The World Still Turns"	Kylie Minogue; Michael Jay; Mark Leggett	Jay	4:00
7.	"Shocked"			4:47
8.	"One Boy Girl"	Minogue; Willie Wilcox	Keith Cohen	4:33
9.	"Things Can Only Get Better"			3:55
10.	"Count the Days"	Minogue; Stephen Bray	Bray; Cohen	4:23
11.	"Rhythm of Love"	Minogue; Bray	Bray; Cohen	4:18
Total length:				44:20

Rhythm of Love – 1990 Japanese edition bonus tracks
No.	Title	Length
12.	"Better the Devil You Know" (Mad March Hare Mix)	7:06
Total length:		51:26

Rhythm of Love – Limited gold edition bonus tracks
No.	Title	Writer(s)	Producer(s)	Length
12.	"Step Back in Time" (Walkin' Rhythm Mix)			7:58
13.	"What Do I Have to Do" (Between the Sheets Remix)		Stock Aitken Waterman; Pete Hammond	7:06
14.	"Shocked" (DNA 12" Mix featuring Jazzy P)	Stock; Aitken; Waterman; Pauline Bennett	Stock Aitken Waterman; DNA	6:14
Total length:				65:38

Rhythm of Love – Australasian Tour Souvenir bonus tracks
No.	Title	Producer(s)	Length
12.	"Better the Devil You Know" (U.S. Remix)	Stock Aitken Waterman; Cohen	6:03
13.	"Step Back in Time" (Walkin' Rhythm Mix)		7:58
14.	"What Do I Have to Do" (Between the Sheets Remix)	Stock Aitken Waterman; Hammond	7:06
Total length:			65:27

Rhythm of Love + Shocked – Australian limited edition bonus CD – "Shocked"
No.	Title	Writer(s)	Producer(s)	Length
1.	"Shocked" (DNA Mix featuring Jazzi P)	Stock; Aitken; Waterman; Bennett	Stock Aitken Waterman; DNA	3:08
2.	"Shocked" (DNA 12" Mix featuring Jazzi P)	Stock; Aitken; Waterman; Bennett	Stock Aitken Waterman; DNA	6:14
3.	"Shocked" (Harding/Curnow 7" Mix)		Stock Aitken Waterman; Phil Harding; Ian Curnow	3:18
Total length:				12:40

Rhythm of Love – 2012 Japanese reissue bonus tracks
No.	Title	Writer(s)	Producer(s)	Length
12.	"Better the Devil You Know" (Dave Ford Remix)		Stock Aitken Waterman; Dave Ford	5:48
13.	"Step Back in Time" (Tony King Mix)		Stock Aitken Waterman; Tony King	7:28
14.	"What Do I Have to Do" (12" Mix)			7:09
15.	"Shocked" (DNA 12" Mix featuring Jazzi P)	Stock; Aitken; Waterman; Bennett	Stock Aitken Waterman; DNA	6:14
16.	"One Boy Girl" (12" Mix)	Minogue; Wilcox	Cohen	4:56
17.	"Things Can Only Get Better" (Original Mix)			3:36
Total length:				79:31

Rhythm of Love – 2015 reissue deluxe version (Disc 1)
No.	Title	Writer(s)	Producer(s)	Length
12.	"Better the Devil You Know" (Mad March Hare Mix)			7:06
13.	"Step Back in Time" (Walkin' Rhythm Mix)			7:58
14.	"What Do I Have to Do" (Pumpin' Mix)			7:47
15.	"Shocked" (DNA 12" Mix featuring Jazzi P)	Stock; Aitken; Waterman; Bennett	Stock Aitken Waterman; DNA	6:14
16.	"Things Can Only Get Better" (Original Mix)			3:36
Total length:				77:01

Rhythm of Love – 2015 reissue deluxe version (Disc 2)
No.	Title	Writer(s)	Producer(s)	Length
1.	"Better the Devil You Know" (Dave Ford Mix)		Stock Aitken Waterman; Ford	5:48
2.	"Step Back in Time" (Tony King Mix)		Stock Aitken Waterman; King	7:28
3.	"What Do I Have to Do" (Between the Sheets Mix)		Stock Aitken Waterman; Hammond	7:06
4.	"Shocked" (Harding/Curnow 12" Mix)		Stock Aitken Waterman; Harding; Curnow	7:31
5.	"Better the Devil You Know" (Alternative Mix)			3:20
6.	"I Am the One for You"	Minogue; Harding; Curnow	Harding; Curnow	3:12
7.	"What Do I Have to Do" (Billy the Fish Mix)			7:31
8.	"Better the Devil You Know" (U.S. Remix)			6:03
9.	"One Boy Girl" (12" Mix)	Minogue; Wilcox	Cohen	4:56
10.	"Shocked" (Harding/Curnow 7" Mix)		Stock Aitken Waterman; Harding; Curnow	3:19
11.	"Things Can Only Get Better" (12" Mix)			7:12
12.	"What Do I Have to Do" (Sax on the Beach Mix)			8:55
13.	"Step Back in Time" (Big Shock Mix)		Stock Aitken Waterman; Steve Anderson	6:38
Total length:				78:59

Rhythm of Love – 2015 reissue deluxe version (Disc 3)
No.	Title	Length
1.	"Better the Devil You Know" (Music video)	3:55
2.	"Step Back in Time" (Music video)	3:04
3.	"What Do I Have to Do" (Music video)	3:28
4.	"Shocked" (Music video)	3:10
5.	"Better the Devil You Know" (Behind the Scenes, part of the bonus footage section)
6.	"Step Back in Time" (Behind the Scenes, part of the bonus footage section)
7.	"What Do I Have to Do" (Behind the Scenes, part of the bonus footage section)
8.	"Better the Devil You Know" (Live on Going Live!)
9.	"Better the Devil You Know" (Live on Top of the Pops)
10.	"Better the Devil You Know" (Live on Christmas Top of the Pops)
11.	"Step Back in Time" (Live on Going Live!)
12.	"Step Back in Time" (Live on Top of the Pops)
13.	"Shocked" (Live on Top of the Pops)

== Personnel ==
Credits adapted from the album's liner notes.

- Kylie Minogue – lead vocals, backing vocals (tracks: 1–4, 7, 9)
- Mike Stock – producer (tracks: 1–5, 7, 9), keyboards (tracks: 1–5, 7, 9), arranger (tracks: 1–5, 7, 9), backing vocals (tracks: 1, 9, 10)
- Matt Aitken – producer (tracks: 1–5, 7, 9), guitar (tracks: 1–5, 7, 9), keyboards (tracks: 1–5, 7, 9), arranger (tracks: 1–5, 7, 9)
- Pete Waterman – producer (tracks: 1–5, 7, 9), arranger (tracks: 1–5, 7, 9)
- Michael Jay – producer (track 6), drum programming (tracks: 6), arranger (track 6)
- Keith "KC" Cohen – producer (tracks: 8, 10, 11), mixing (tracks: 8, 10, 11), engineer (tracks: 10, 11)
- Stephen Bray – producer (track 10, 11), keyboards (tracks: 10, 11)
- Claude Gaudette – keyboards (track 6), arranger (track 6)
- Brad Buxter – keyboards (track 8)
- Doug Grigsby – keyboards (tracks: 10, 11), additional programming (track 8), bass (track 11)
- Luis C. Conte – percussion (tracks: 8, 10, 11)
- John DeFaria – guitar (track 6)
- David Williams – guitar (tracks: 8, 10, 11)
- A Linn – drums (tracks: 1–5, 7, 9)
- Jim Oppenheim – saxophone (track 6)
- David Boruff – saxophone (tracks: 10, 11)
- Steve Harvey – programming (track 8)
- Mark Leggett – drum programming (tracks: 6)
- Mae McKenna – backing vocals (tracks: 1, 3, 4, 5, 7, 9)
- Miriam Stockley – backing vocals (tracks: 1–5, 7, 9)
- Linda Taylor – backing vocals (tracks: 2–5, 7)
- Maxi Anderson – backing vocals (tracks: 6, 8)
- Joey Diggs – backing vocals (track 6)
- Alice Echols – backing vocals (track 6)
- Monalisa Young – backing vocals (track 8)
- Peggie Blu – backing vocals (track 8)
- Karen Hewitt – engineer (tracks: 1, 9)
- Yoyo – engineer (tracks: 1, 9)
- Peter Day – engineer (tracks: 2–5, 7, 9), mixing (track 6)
- Michael McDonald – engineer (track 6)
- Czaba Petocz – engineer (track 6)
- John Chamberlin – assistant engineer (track 10)
- Kimm James – assistant engineer (tracks: 10, 11), assistant producer
- Sylvia Massy – assistant engineer (track 10), mixing assistant
- Mauricio Guerrero – assistant engineer
- Mitch Zelezny – assistant engineer
- Pete Hammond – mixing (tracks: 1, 4, 5, 7, 9)
- Harding & Currow – mixing (tracks: 2, 3)
- Markus Morianz – photography
- Nick Egan – art direction, design
- Eric Roinestad – design
- Chris Lupton – 2015 reissue design
- Tom Parker – 2015 reissue production
- Ian Usher – 2015 reissue project management

== Charts ==
=== Weekly charts ===
Chart performance for Rhythm of Love in 1990
Chart (1990)	Peak position
Australian Albums (ARIA)	10
Dutch Albums (Album Top 100)	76
European Albums (Music & Media)	27
French Albums (SNEP)	25
Irish Albums (Music & Media)	2
Japanese Albums (Oricon)	32
New Zealand Albums (RMNZ)	36
Spanish Albums (PROMUSICAE)	26
Swedish Albums (Sverigetopplistan)	44
UK Albums (OCC)	9

Chart performance for Rhythm of Love in 2015
Chart (2015)	Peak position
UK Albums (OCC)	96

=== Year-end charts ===
1990 year-end chart performance for Rhythm of Love
Chart (1990)	Position
Australian Albums (ARIA)	77
UK Albums (OCC)	82

1991 year-end chart performance for Rhythm of Love
Chart (1991)	Position
Australian Albums (ARIA)	52
French Albums (SNEP)	79

== Certifications and sales ==
Certifications and sales for Rhythm of Love
Region	Certification	Certified units/sales
Australia (ARIA)	Platinum	70,000^{^}
Japan	—	67,000
Spain (Promusicae)	Gold	50,000^{^}
United Kingdom (BPI)	Gold	300,000
^{^} Shipments figures based on certification alone.

== Release history ==
Release dates and formats for Rhythm of Love
Region	Date	Edition(s)	Format(s)	Label(s)	Ref(s).
United Kingdom	12 November 1990	Standard	CD; cassette; LP	PWL	
Japan	15 December 1990	Standard	CD; cassette; LP	PWL	
Australia	3 December 1990	Standard	CD; cassette; LP	Mushroom	
United Kingdom	12 November 1990	Limited Gold	Cassette; LP	PWL	
Australia	3 December 1990	Australasian Tour Souvenir	CD; cassette; LP	Mushroom	
Australia	12 August 1991	Limited bonus CD – "Shocked"	CD; cassette	Mushroom	
Japan	10 July 1993	Standard	CD	WEA	
Japan	25 April 1995	Standard	CD	WEA	
Australia	29 September 1998	Standard	CD	Mushroom	
Japan	7 November 2012	Standard	CD	PWL	
United Kingdom	9 February 2015	Special edition; Collector's Edition	CD; DVD; LP	Cherry Red; PWL	
Japan	9 February 2015	Special edition; Collector's Edition	CD; DVD; LP	Cherry Red; PWL	

== See also ==
- List of UK top-ten albums in 1990
