= Step Back in Time =

1990 single by Kylie Minogue

Single by Kylie Minogue

from the album Rhythm of Love
- Released: 22 October 1990
- Studio: PWL (London, England)
- Genre: Disco; pop
- Length: 3:05
- Label: PWL
- Songwriters: Mike Stock; Matt Aitken; Pete Waterman
- Producer: Stock Aitken Waterman

Kylie Minogue singles chronology
| "Better the Devil You Know" (1990) | "Step Back in Time" (1990) | "What Do I Have to Do" (1991) |

Music video
- "Step Back in Time" on YouTube

"Step Back in Time" is a song by Australian singer Kylie Minogue from her third studio album, Rhythm of Love (1990). It was released as the album's second single on 22 October 1990 and distributed by PWL and Mushroom in several formats, including a CD single, cassette tape, and 7-inch and 12-inch vinyl releases. Written, arranged, and produced by Mike Stock, Matt Aitken, and Pete Waterman—collectively known as Stock Aitken and Waterman—the track was recorded in London, United Kingdom. Musically, it is a disco song that lyrically pays tribute to 1970s culture.

"Step Back in Time" received positive reviews from music critics. Several critics selected it as one of Minogue's finest songs, praising its production and backing track. The single achieved commercial success in markets including Australia, the United Kingdom, Spain, Finland, and Ireland, while also peaking within the top 40 in France, New Zealand, and Switzerland.

The accompanying music video, directed by visual artist Nick Egan, also pays homage to 1970s aesthetics and figures. Minogue has performed the song on seven of her concert tours, most recently during her Summer 2019 tour. Since its release, "Step Back in Time" has also appeared in various media, including the 2013 British comic science fiction film The World's End.

== Background and composition ==
"Step Back in Time" was written, arranged, and produced by Mike Stock, Matt Aitken and Pete Waterman, collectively known as Stock, Aitken and Waterman. It was recorded in London, England, whilst Stock and Aitken provided instrumentation including keyboards, drums, trumpets and guitars. While expressing his pride in the song, Stock felt the lyrical concept wasn't taken to its full potential due to time constraints.

The song was mixed very early on in the process by Phil Harding and Ian Curnow, after Pete Waterman decided to meet Kylie's demands for a newer and much more dance-inspired sound by upping the creative and co-production involvement of his mix teams. This caused some friction, with Matt Aitken and Mike Stock both voicing some dissatisfaction with elements of the result, with Stock in particular unhappy with the bass sound.

After Minogue's musical adaption to mainstream dance and disco music, particularly experimented with the predecessor single "Better the Devil You Know", "Step Back in Time" was composed as a disco song that intended to pay tribute to the 1970s culture and sound. According to Minogue's official website, the lyrical content "paid homage to the classic songs and dance moves of the disco era." However, Jon Kutner, who wrote the book 1000 UK Number One Hits, labelled the sound as a "jingly pop song", a sentiment also echoed by AllMusic's Tim Sendra. According to the demo sheet music at Music Notes published by Universal Music Publishing Group, the song is set in E Minor and has a time signature of common time with a tempo of 126 beats per minute. During the opening sequence and first verse, it has a chord progression of Em-D-G/D-Cm7♭5-C-Bm7-Em-D-C/D-Cm7♭5-C-Bm7-Em-Em9, and Minogue's vocals span between the notes B4 and B5. In retrospect, Waterman commented that the production and completion of "Step Back in Time" took longer to create than expected.

== Release and reception ==
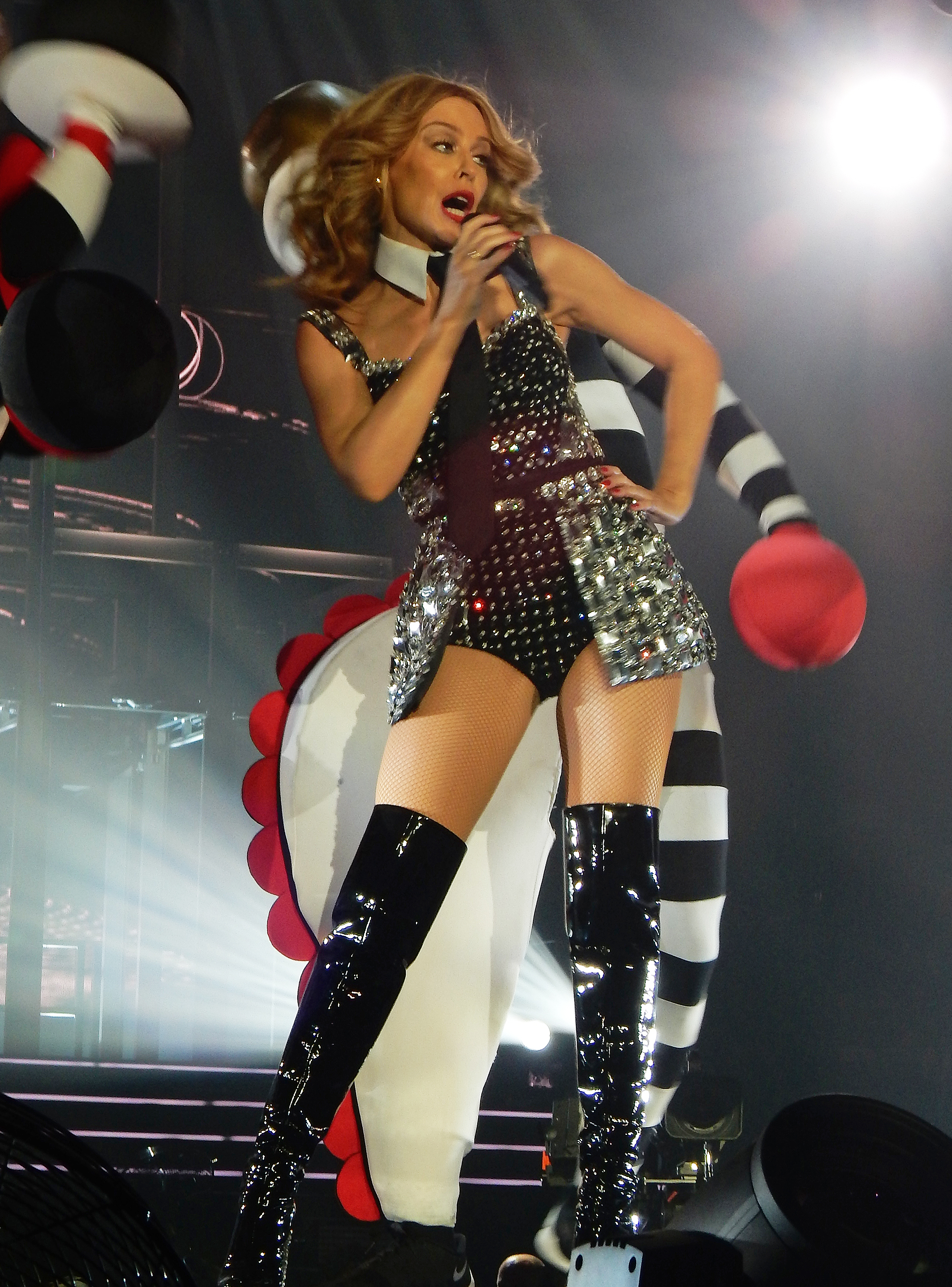
Minogue singing "Step Back in Time" during her Kiss Me Once Tour (2014–15)

Originally, the follow-up single, "What Do I Have to Do?", from Rhythm of Love was intended to be released after "Better the Devil You Know", but PWL executives scrapped the idea and changed it to "Step Back in Time". "Step Back in Time" was released as the album's second single on 22 October 1990, and distributed by PWL and Mushroom. A standard 12-inch and 7-inch vinyl were released worldwide, and featured the original recording, instrumental version and the Walkin' Rhythm mix; in the UK, the original recording was omitted. On 28 November 1990, a CD single was issued by PWL in Japan. In France, a special mini CD included the original recording and instrumental version. In Minogue's native Australia, the single was released on 19 November 1990 on 7-inch vinyl, 12-inch vinyl, CD, and cassette. As part of the PWL Archives, a 10-track EP was released on iTunes Store in 2009.

"Step Back in Time" received positive reviews from most music critics. British author and music critic Adrian Denning selected the single as the best offering on Rhythm of Love (1990), stating that he preferred it over the "more popular 'Better the Devil You Know'." Denning commended the production of the song, more so complimented the backing track. Similarly, Nick Levine from Digital Spy pointed out the song as one of the better cuts from the parent album. AllMusic's Chris True, who wrote the biography of Minogue on the website, selected the track amongst some of Minogue's best work. However, in a separate review of the single, True awarded the single two stars out of five.

Cameron Adams from the Herald Sun placed it at number 17 on his list of the singer's best songs in honour of her 50th birthday, writing that: "["Step Back in Time"] flips the script and makes it about the love of music. 'Remember the old days/Remember the O’Jays', Kylie sang for people who weren't old enough to remember the O’Jays. Heck, Kylie herself wasn't old enough to remember the O’Jays. But this is a brilliant homage to the disco anthem — Motown meets HiNRG meets Studio 54 — and indeed may have single-handedly laid the path for Disco Kylie, a touchstone of her career to this day". Olive Pometsey from GQ deemed it a "three-minutes-and-seven-seconds taste of what Studio 54 might have been like if ABBA had been regulars". In 2020, Alexis Petridis of British daily newspaper The Guardian ranked the song at number 19 in his "Kylie's 30 greatest singles" list, adding that it was a "total joy". In 2023, Robert Moran of Australian daily tabloid newspaper The Sydney Morning Herald ranked the song as Minogue's 106th best song (out of 183), adding that although he was not impressed by the song, "the hiphop production, still novel for Kylie at the time, salvages it". In 2024, British magazine Classic Pop ranked the song at number 25 in its list of "Top 40 Kylie Minogue songs".

== Commercial performance ==
Commercially, the single experienced success in regions such as Australia, United Kingdom, and Ireland. It debuted at number eight on the Australian Singles Chart, the highest debut of the chart week 2 December 1990, and peaked at number five the following week. The single was certified Gold by the Australian Recording Industry Association (ARIA) for physical shipments of 35,000 units in that region. It had a similar chart run on the UK Singles Chart, where it debuted at number nine, and peaked at number four the following week. It stayed inside the top 10 for three weeks, and the top 100 chart for eight weeks in total. It peaked at number four on the Irish Singles Chart, her second consecutive single to peak in that position after "Better the Devil You Know", and was present for six weeks in total.

Outside of these regions, "Step Back in Time" experienced moderate success. In New Zealand, it entered at number 36 on the singles chart. It peaked at number 21 in its third week, but fell outside the top 50 the following week. It peaked at number 19 in Sweden, and fell to number 20 the following week; it was present for two charting weeks. In the Belgium region Flanders, it debuted at number 22 and reached number 11 in its third week; it stayed there for three consecutive weeks, and stayed in the top 100 chart for 10 weeks. It stayed inside the German Singles Chart for 15 weeks, peaking at number 36, and peaked at number 23 on the French Singles Chart for the same charting span as the former chart. Elsewhere, the single reached number 29 in Switzerland and 36 on the Dutch Top 40 chart.

== Music video ==
An accompanying music video was directed by visual artist Nick Egan in Los Angeles, who says aspects of the retro concept were conceived by Minogue. He cast one of his friends, singer N'Dea Davenport, in the video. It was Minogue's first video to have been shot outside of Australia or the United Kingdom. According to British fashion designer and Minogue's long-term friend William Baker, who contributed to writing Minogue's biography Kylie: La La La (2002), he wrote that Minogue wanted to pay homage to the 1970s culture and figures, as she believed that was the era that celebrated disco music. The video opens with Minogue putting an 8-track tape in a stereo, and moves to moments with Minogue and back-up dancers dancing near a large cityscape; intercut scenes have Minogue in a blue room wearing colourful clothing. Minogue and the back-up dancers are driving in a red Cadillac throughout Los Angeles. Another shot, which inspired by the artwork of the single, featured Minogue in a green and pink dress dancing in front of the wall of patterns and lights. Throughout the video, majority of the scenes repeat and has Minogue singing the entire track. According to British author Sean Smith, who had written a biography detailing Minogue's career, the video "positioned Minogue as a dance artist", but stated that the public was "not convinced" and attracted negative commentary upon its release.

== Live performances, other uses and appearances ==
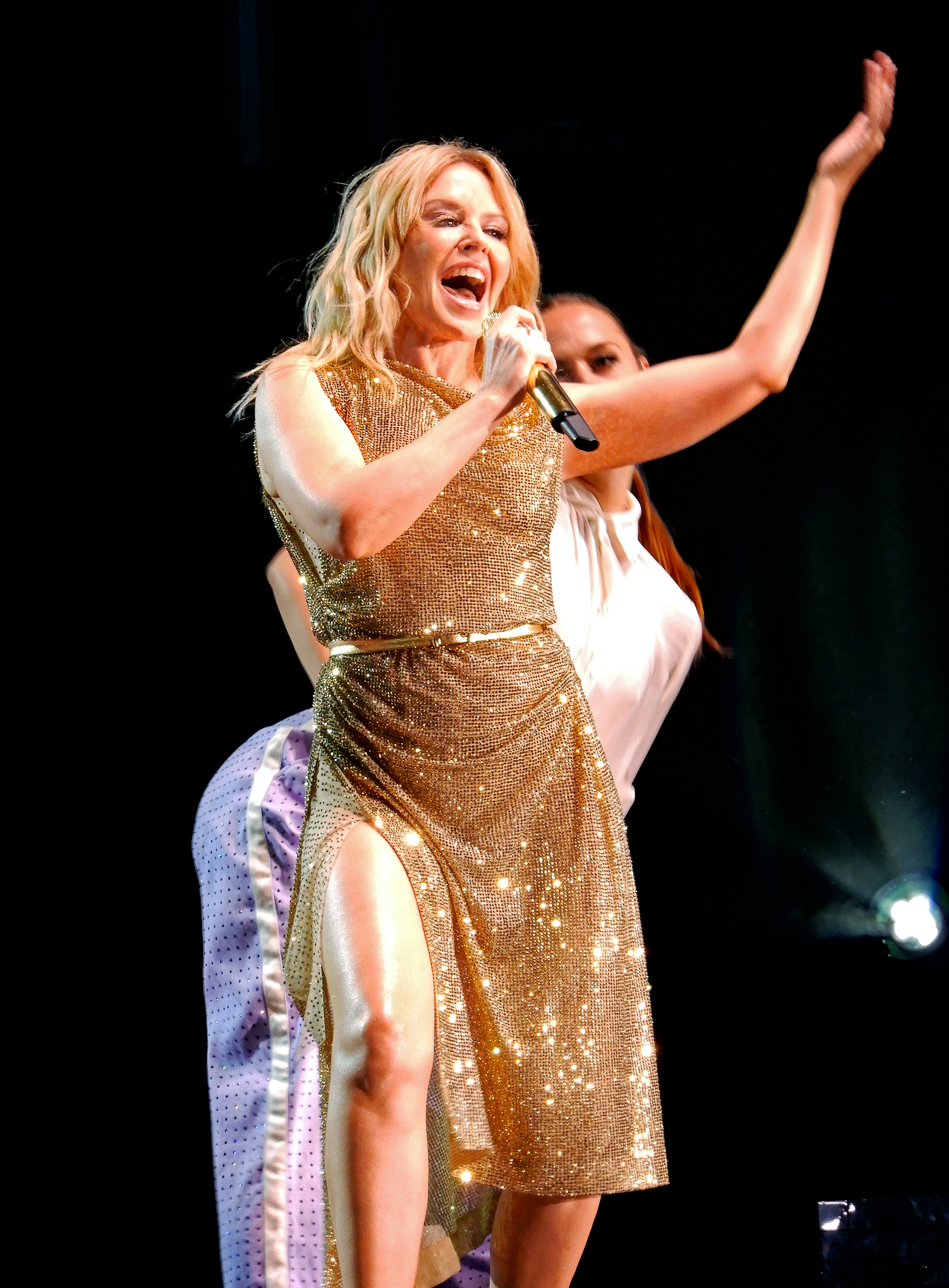
Minogue singing "Step Back in Time" on her 2019 summer tour

"Step Back in Time" has been performed on several concert tours by Minogue. The track's first appearance was during her Rhythm of Love Tour, where it was the opening number. It appeared again as the opening track to Minogue's follow-up Let's Get to It Tour, and was included on the live release that was recorded in Dublin, Ireland. Seven years later, it was included on Minogue's 1998 Intimate and Live show, where it was sung on the third segment. It was next sung during her Hits Medley section of the 2001 On a Night Like This Tour, and was included on the live DVD of the show.

On her 2005 Showgirl: The Greatest Hits Tour in London, United Kingdom, a sample of the track was sung during the performance of her 2000 single "Spinning Around". This act was re-vamped and was sampled again on the show's extension Showgirl: The Homecoming Tour, which was a comeback after her diagnosis of breast cancer in May 2005. For Minogue's X Tour, the song appeared during the Black Verses White segment. "Step Back in Time" was also performed as part of a medley on the 2012 Queen's Diamond Jubilee concert in London, United Kingdom. It was also added to the set list of 2014-15's Kiss Me Once Tour and her 2015 summer tour. Most recently, "Step Back in Time" was performed during Minogue's 2019 summer tour. "Step Back in Time" has appeared on numerous greatest hits compilation albums, throughout the years, conducted by Minogue, including Greatest Hits (1990), Ultimate Kylie (2004), K25: Time Capsule (2012) and was the namesake for her latest compilation, Step Back In Time: The Definitive Collection (2019)

== Formats and track listings ==
- CD single
1. "Step Back in Time" (Edit) – 3:05
2. "Step Back in Time" (Walkin' Rhythm Mix) – 8:05
3. "Step Back in Time" (Instrumental) – 3:30
- 12-inch vinyl
1. "Step Back in Time" (Edit) – 3:05
2. "Step Back in Time" (Walkin' Rhythm Mix) – 8:05
3. "Step Back in Time" (Instrumental) – 3:30
- UK 12-inch vinyl
1. "Step Back in Time" (Walkin' Rhythm Mix) – 8:05
2. "Step Back in Time" (Instrumental) – 3:30
- Cassette single
1. "Step Back in Time" (Edit) – 3:05
2. "Step Back in Time" (Walkin' Rhythm Mix) – 8:05
3. "Step Back in Time" (Instrumental) – 3:30
- French mini CD
1. "Step Back in Time" (Edit) – 3:05
2. "Step Back in Time" (Instrumental) – 3:30
- Digital EP
1. "Step Back in Time" – 3:05
2. "Step Back in Time" (Walkin' Rhythm Mix) – 7:58
3. "Step Back in Time" (Harding/Curnow Remix) – 6:45
4. "Step Back in Time" (Tony King Remix) – 7:28
5. "Step Back in Time" (Original 12-inch Mix) – 8:07
6. "Step Back in Time" (7-inch Instrumental) – 3:29
7. "Step Back in Time" (Extended Instrumental) – 4:58
8. "Step Back in Time" (Backing Track) – 3:04
9. "Secrets" (Instrumental) – 4:05
10. "Secrets" (Backing Track) – 4:05

== Credits and personnel ==
Credits are adapted from the CD liner notes of "Step Back in Time".

Recording and mixing

- Recorded in London, England, and mixed at Larrabee Studios, North Hollywood, California.

Personnel

- Kylie Minogue – vocals, backing vocals
- Linda Taylor – backing vocals
- Mae McKenna – backing vocals
- Peter Day – engineer
- Matt Aitken – songwriting, composing, keyboards, guitar, production
- Mike Stock – songwriting, composing, keyboards, production
- Pete Waterman – songwriting, composing, production
- Ian Curnow – mixing
- Phil Harding – mixing
- Markus Morianz – photography
- Nick Egan – music video director, packaging design

== Charts ==
=== Weekly charts ===
Weekly chart performance for "Step Back in Time"
| Chart (1990–1991) | Peak position |
|---|---|
| Australia (ARIA) | 5 |
| Belgium (Ultratop 50 Flanders) | 11 |
| Europe (Eurochart Hot 100) | 12 |
| Finland (Suomen virallinen lista) | 4 |
| France (SNEP) | 23 |
| Germany (GfK) | 36 |
| Ireland (IRMA) | 4 |
| Luxembourg (Radio Luxembourg) | 3 |
| Netherlands (Dutch Top 40) | 49 |
| Netherlands (Single Top 100) | 36 |
| New Zealand (Recorded Music NZ) | 21 |
| Spain (AFYVE) | 6 |
| Sweden (Sverigetopplistan) | 19 |
| Switzerland (Schweizer Hitparade) | 29 |
| UK Singles (Official Charts) | 4 |
| UK Airplay (Music Week) | 6 |
| UK Dance (Music Week) | 40 |
| UK Indie (Music Week) | 1 |

=== Year-end charts ===
Year-end chart performance for "Step Back in Time"
| Chart (1990) | Position |
|---|---|
| Australia (ARIA) | 91 |
| UK Singles (OCC) | 95 |

== Certifications ==
Certifications and sales for "Step Back in Time"
| Region | Certification | Certified units/sales |
|---|---|---|
| Australia (ARIA) | Gold | 35,000^{^} |
^{^} Shipments figures based on certification alone.
