= Shocked (song) =

1991 single by Kylie Minogue

Single by Kylie Minogue

from the album Rhythm of Love
- Released: 20 May 1991
- Studio: PWL The Hit Factory (London, England)
- Genre: Electropop; house; hi-NRG
- Length: 4:48 (album version); 3:07 (DNA 7-inch mix)
- Label: Mushroom; PWL
- Songwriters: Matt Aitken; Mike Stock; Pete Waterman; Pauline Bennett (remix)
- Producers: Stock Aitken Waterman; DNA (remix)

Kylie Minogue singles chronology
"What Do I Have to Do" (1991)	"Shocked" (1991)	"Word Is Out" (1991)

Music video
- "Shocked" on YouTube

"Shocked" is a song by Australian singer Kylie Minogue from her third studio album, Rhythm of Love (1990). Written and produced by Stock Aitken and Waterman, "Shocked" was released as the album's fourth and final single in May 1991 by Mushroom and PWL. The song later appeared on most of Minogue's major compilations including Greatest Hits (1992), Ultimate Kylie (2004) and Step Back In Time: The Definitive Collection (2019). The DNA 7-inch mix of the song also includes a rap in the bridge by Jazzi P.

Lyrically, the song canvasses confusion and understanding of love and relationships. Composer Mike Stock says the track was inspired by the writings of Virginia Woolf and is meant to invoke "a trip". The song has been compared by critics to her previous single "What Do I Have to Do". "Shocked" received mostly positive reviews from critics, with many praising its catchiness. Commercially, the song was successful, peaking in the top ten in her native Australia, the United Kingdom, and several other countries.

An accompanying music video was filmed for the single, shot in London. The video features Minogue entering a mansion-style home, where she is seduced by a mysterious man. The song has been noted to have a close similarity to Minogue's previous single's video "What Do I Have to Do", which featured the same man (her then boyfriend Zane O'Donnell) in a similar atmosphere. The song has been noted as one of Minogue's best singles to date, despite limited success outside her native Australia and the United Kingdom.

== Background ==
"Shocked" was written and produced by Mike Stock, Matt Aitken and Pete Waterman, who had written and produced almost all of Minogue's material to that point, and went on to do the same for her fourth album Let's Get To It (1991), before Minogue parted ways with them. Although not originally intended as a single, the song was released as the fourth and final release from the Rhythm of Love album. The single version of the song was remixed by DNA and features a rap verse from rapper Jazzi P, who says she was only paid £200 for writing and performing the rap, and does not get any publishing royalties.

== Critical reception ==
=== Initial response ===
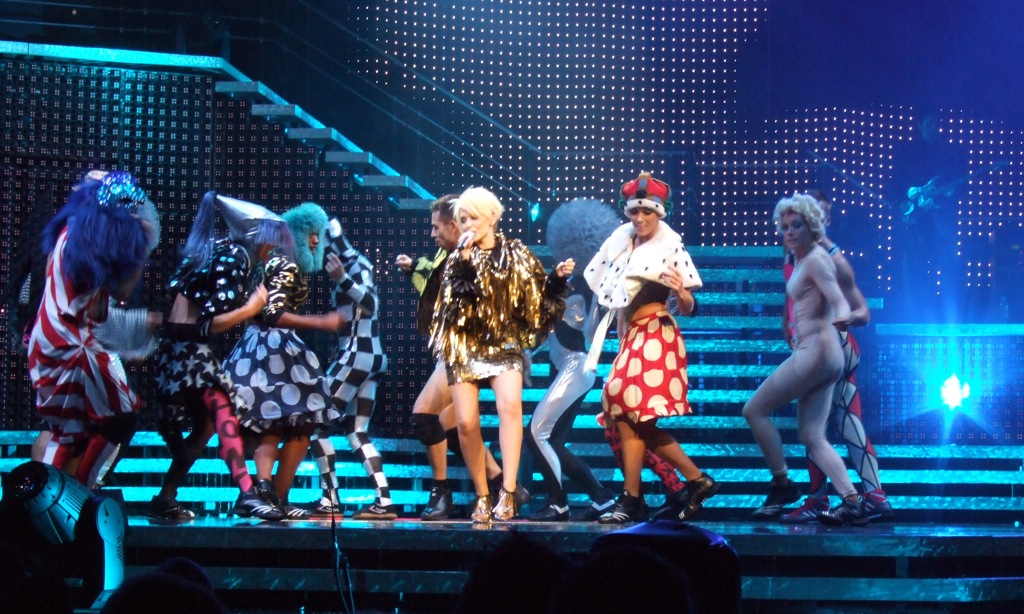
Minogue and her dancers performing "Shocked" during Showgirl: The Homecoming Tour (2006)

"Shocked" received positive reviews from most music critics. James Hamilton from Record Mirror wrote, "Shocked you will be, by Skinny Minnie's radical new direction." He noted that "'Get Loose' rapper Jazzi P actually kicking off the A-side's almost Betty Boo-type scuffing and scampering hip house 112bpm DNA Mix". Larry Flick from Billboard magazine called it "festive" and "house-inflected", adding that the track "is so catchy that it could be the multiformat hit that Minogue has been after." Nick Levine from Digital Spy misunderstood the lyrics as he said, "On 'Shocked', is she... would she... could she be singing "I was f**ked to my very foundations?". (DNA have denied that the obscenity was added to their mix.) Alan Jones from Music Week stated that it "finds the diminutive Aussie in typically nasal form, but DNA's brilliant Italo house style remix and Jazzi P's cute rapping make it one that even upfront clubs can play." Hunter Felt from PopMatters enjoyed the song, saying that, while reviewing Ultimate Kylie, that they needed "even a little funk [on tracks like 'Shocked']". Mark Frith from Smash Hits praised it as "brilliant", noting that Minogue "goes for a powerful Hi-NRG sound". He also complimented the singer's voice as "strong and insistent". Quentin Harrison from Albumism described the song as "luxuriant electro-pop". Johnny Loftus from AllMusic highlighted "Shocked" as an album standout from Minogue's compilation, Greatest Hits: 87-99. Also Stylus Magazine gave it a positive review, saying that along with "Give Me Just a Little More Time" and "What Do I Have to Do", they "were great songs and suddenly Kylie was a little bit cool."

=== Impact and legacy ===
In 2020, Alexis Petridis of British daily newspaper The Guardian ranked the song at number five in his "Kylie's 30 greatest singles" list, adding that it saw Stock, Aitken and Waterman "abandoning their identikit sound, writing better, classier songs and... commissioning a remix by DNA which is very 1990 – breakbeat, house piano, rap – and a delight". In 2021, British magazine Classic Pop ranked the song number 28 in their list of "Top 40 Stock Aitken Waterman songs". They wrote, "It took a DNA remix armed with bustling rhythms and pounding piano stabs and a rap cameo from Jazzi P to bring the fourth and final single from Rhythm Of Love out of its shell, but Kylie's 1991 hit was very much SAW at their songwriting and production best. Sex came to the forefront for the "What Do I Have to Do" video that preceded it, and Kylie continued in that steamy, seductive vein for "Shocked", with snogging, brassieres and even a spot of keyhole voyeurism no doubt helping her to her 13th successive Top 10 UK single." The song's legacy extends to the porn world, with its rap quoted in an American gay erotic video. In 2023, Robert Moran of Australian daily tabloid newspaper The Sydney Morning Herald ranked the song as Minogue's fourth best song (out of 183), describing it a SAW "masterpiece", and added: "A fat bassline and heavy electro beat makes way for acid squiggles, a huge guitar riff, even cowbell... Kylie's delivery is flawless and that chorus is perfect".

== Chart performance ==
"Shocked" received moderate success throughout the charts. In Minogue's native Australia, the song debuted at number thirteen. The song then rose to number seven, where it eventually peaked. The song then fell out the top ten, and stayed in the charts for eleven weeks in total. In the United Kingdom, the song debuted at number ten on the UK Singles Chart. The song then ascended to number six, where it eventually peaked. It stayed in the charts for a total of seven weeks. Due to the top ten chart performance of the song in the UK, Minogue became the first artist in the history of the UK charts to have their first thirteen releases go top ten. "Shocked" also became a successful top-10 hit in Finland, Luxembourg, Ireland and Israel.

== Music video ==
The music video for "Shocked" was shot in Paris, France as Minogue was finishing her photoshoot in Paris. The video featured Minogue in a number of disguises. It also features rapper Jazzi P. According to Minogue's long-term friend William Baker, her team intended to tie her previous video for "What Do I Have to Do" to this video.

== Track listings ==
- Australian 7-inch and cassette single, UK 12-inch and cassette single
1. "Shocked" (DNA Remix)
2. "Shocked" (Harding/Curnow Remix)
- UK CD single
1. "Shocked" (DNA 7-inch mix) – 3:10
2. "Shocked" (DNA 12-inch mix) – 6:20
3. "Shocked" (Harding/Curnow 12-inch mix) – 7:30
- Digital download
1. "Shocked" (DNA 7-inch mix) – 3:08
2. "Shocked" (DNA 12-inch mix) – 6:14
3. "Shocked" (DNA original 7-inch mix) – 4:11
4. "Shocked" (DNA backing track) – 3:08
5. "One Boy Girl" (12-inch mix) – 4:55
6. "One Boy Girl" (instrumental) – 4:32
7. "One Boy Girl" (backing track) – 4:32
8. "Always Find the Time" (instrumental) – 3:35
9. "Always Find the Time" (backing track) – 3:35

== Charts ==
=== Weekly charts ===
Chart (1991)	Peak position
Australia (ARIA)	7
Belgium (Ultratop 50 Flanders)	18
Europe (Eurochart Hot 100)	15
Europe (European Hit Radio)	22
Finland (Suomen virallinen lista)	8
Ireland (IRMA)	2
Israel (Israeli Singles Chart)	4
Luxembourg (Radio Luxembourg)	6
UK Singles (Official Charts)	6
UK Airplay (Music Week)	12
UK Dance (Music Week)	29
UK Indie (Music Week)	1

=== Year-end chart ===
Chart (1991)	Position
Australia (ARIA)	73

== Release history ==
Region	Date	Format(s)	Label(s)	Ref.
United Kingdom	20 May 1991	7-inch vinyl; 12-inch vinyl; CD; cassette	PWL	
Australia	17 June 1991	7-inch vinyl; 12-inch vinyl; CD; cassette	Mushroom	
Japan	21 July 1991	CD	PWL	
