= What Do I Have to Do =

1991 single by Kylie Minogue

Single by Kylie Minogue

from the album Rhythm of Love
- Released: 21 January 1991
- Studio: London, England
- Genre: Dance-pop; electropop; techno
- Length: 3:43 (album version); 3:33 (7" mix)
- Label: Mushroom; PWL
- Songwriters: Mike Stock; Matt Aitken; Pete Waterman
- Producer: Stock Aitken Waterman

Kylie Minogue singles chronology
"Step Back in Time" (1990)	"What Do I Have to Do" (1991)	"Shocked" (1991)

Music video
- "What Do I Have to Do" on YouTube

"What Do I Have to Do" is a song performed by Australian singer-songwriter Kylie Minogue from her third studio album, Rhythm of Love (1990). The song was written and produced by Stock, Aitken & Waterman. Originally, the song was planned to be released after the single "Better the Devil You Know", but instead "Step Back in Time" was released and this was released as the third single on 21 January 1991 by Mushroom and PWL Records. The song received positive reviews from most music critics, who thought the song was an instant rave classic. Its music video was directed by Dave Hogan.

The song peaked at number eleven in her native Australia. The song did however peak at number six in the United Kingdom, becoming a success there, albeit her first single not to reach the top five. The song was also a hit in France and the Netherlands. NME voted it as the thirtieth best track of 1991.

Minogue performed the song as her debut performance at the Sydney Gay and Lesbian Mardi Gras in 1994. The song has been performed on most of Minogue's concert tours, including her Rhythm of Love Tour, Let's Get to It Tour and Intimate and Live Tour. The song has also been performed at the Showgirl: The Greatest Hits Tour and the Homecoming Tour, the Aphrodite World Tour and during her 2025 Tension Tour.

== Background ==
Producers Stock Aitken Waterman conceived the track as a response to the surging popularity of rave and techno music in the UK. It was heavily inspired by the track "Hardcore Uproar" by Together. The move towards heavier dance sounds caused some tension and discontent at the production house, with Mike Stock uncomfortable with the move away from traditional pop songs.

There are three official promotional mixes of the song. The early, unreleased first version is synth orienated and has multilayered vocals. Much of the synth was omitted, and the drums, bass and vocals were toned down for the second album version. The third version, the 7" Mix, contains a newer drum track, multilayered vocals in the chorus and relies much less on the synthesizers than on the album version. This version of the song also contains samples from American comedian Sam Kinison, and was used for the music video. In the UK, a limited edition 7″ single came with postcards with shots from the video.

Originally, "What Do I Have To Do" was planned to be released as the follow-up single to "Better the Devil You Know", but was released as the third single off the album, and the track was remixed for single release. The 1999 biographical book Girl Next Door identified this track as Kylie's favourite to perform live. The single artwork was photographed by Robert Erdmann, and were originally produced for a photoshoot for I-D magazine. The frames were personally selected by Minogue.

== Critical reception ==
=== Initial response ===
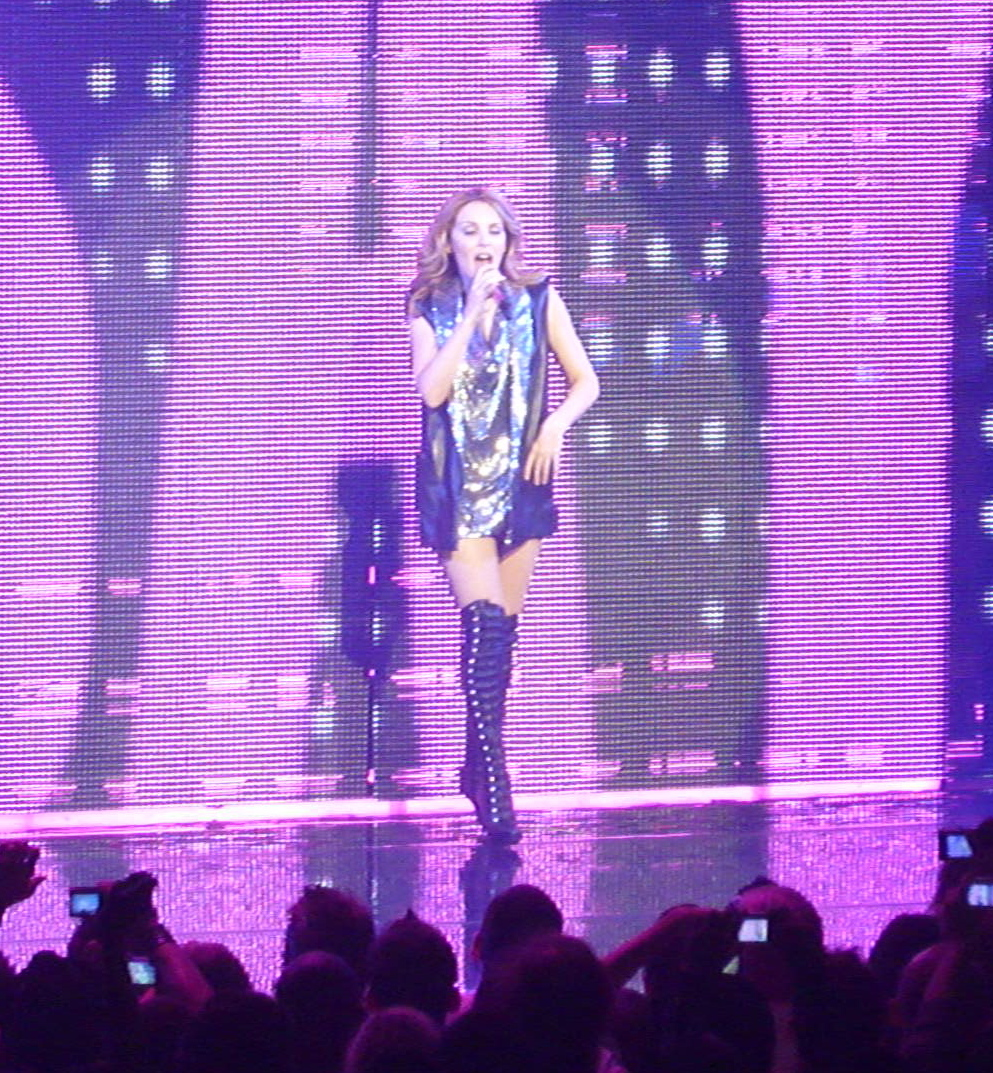
Minogue performing the track during her For You, for Me Tour (2009)

"What Do I Have To Do" received positive reviews from many music critics. Jason Shawahn from About.com said the song, along with "Better the Devil You Know" and "Wouldn't Change a Thing", "are nothing if not pop masterpieces." He also labelled it a "pop classic". Quentin Harrison from Albumism noted it as "luxuriant electro-pop", adding that Ian Curnow and Phil Harding "rework it into an appetizing, but accessible house ditty that emphasizes unity between the single's beat and Minogue's supple vocal." While reviewing Rhythm of Love, Chris True from AllMusic highlighted the song as an album standout. Eleanor Levy from Record Mirror described it as "more mature, in a Hi-NRG, Bronski Beatish way." She added, "More straightforward rhythm than formula pop song, it fizzes predictably rather than sparkles but, like Kylie's ever-elongating fringe, will no doubt grow and grow." Caroline Sullivan from Smash Hits called it "supreme", and felt the song "sees a return to the reassuring old Kylie-sound". Jonathan Bernstein from Spin viewed it as a "knockout" pop single", that "mirrored her evolution from tomboy to dreamboat." While reviewing Ultimate Kylie, Mark Edwards from Stylus Magazine gave it a positive remark, saying that along with "Shocked" and "Give Me Just a Little More Time", they "were great songs and suddenly Kylie was a little bit cool." In 2017, Christian Guiltenane of British magazine Attitude described it as being "Kylie's best PWL song and video for sure".

=== Impact and legacy ===
NME ranked "What Do I Have to Do" number 30 in their list of "Singles of the Year" in December 1991. English DJ and record producer Nicky Holloway chose "What Do I Have to Do" as one of his top 10 vinyl thrills in 1996, saying, "I've had so much fun with this over the years. You don't realise what you're dancing to until it's too late to stop! It's got a long intro so people are dancing away and don't realise that it's Kylie Minogue until they're sucked into it." In 2020, Alexis Petridis of British daily newspaper The Guardian ranked the song at number 12 in his "Kylie's 30 greatest singles" list, adding that it was "great, a shamelessly pop-facing take on Italo-house". In 2023, in the same newspaper, he listed the song at number seven in his "Stock Aitken Waterman's 20 greatest songs – ranked!", adding: "The trio rose to the challenge, coming up with better songs and a hipper, less generic production style: house-fuelled, monster-chorused, "What Do I Have to Do" sparkles." In 2023 too, Robert Moran of Australian daily tabloid newspaper The Sydney Morning Herald ranked the song as Minogue's 32nd best song (out of 183), praising the singer's "full embrace of '90s UK acid house". In 2024, British magazine Classic Pop ranked the song at number seven in its list of "Top 40 Kylie Minogue songs", describing it as "gushingly grandiose and with a ravey piano line that directed us to the dancefloor" and a song "at the apex of Kylie's PWL catalogue, and unmistakably SAW".

== Chart performance ==
"What Do I Have to Do" debuted at number twenty-seven on the Australian Singles Chart, until rising and peaking at number eleven, staying there for two consecutive weeks. The song then debuted at number ninety-nine on the Dutch Top 40, until peaking at number eighty-one for one week. The song then debuted and peaked at number fifty on the French Singles Chart.

== Music video ==
The accompanying music video for the song was directed by Dave Hogan, who says he was offered the commission without needing to pitch ideas in advance. He and Minogue later agreed on the visual style of the project after sharing an enthusiasm for a photo feature in Vogue Italia. The video was filmed over two days, using four locations, including an indoor swimming pool in a private home. Stylist David Thomas supplied all of the looks for the video, except one vintage dress that Minogue supplied herself. In relation to this video, Minogue is quoted as saying "how many Hollywood stars can you look like in three and a half minutes". Her younger sister Dannii Minogue also appears in the video. The video received heavy rotation on MTV Europe in March 1991. While reviewing the DVD version of Greatest Hits, John Galilee said "Her most outrageous but greatest video moment is where she parodies certain movie stars in the chic video for "What Do I Have to Do?", and because of her heavy eye make-up almost earns herself the title drag-queen Kylie (watch out for sister Dannii who briefly stars in the video, wearing a blonde wig)."

== Formats and track listings ==
These are the formats and track listings of major single releases of "What Do I Have to Do".

- 7" vinyl single
1. "What Do I Have to Do" (7" Mix) – 3:32
2. "What Do I Have to Do" (Instrumental) – 3:48
- 12" vinyl single
1. "What Do I Have to Do" (Pumpin' Mix) – 7:48
2. "What Do I Have to Do" (Extended Instrumental) – 5:08
- CD single
1. "What Do I Have to Do" (7" Mix) – 3:32
2. "What Do I Have to Do" (Pumpin' Mix) – 7:48
3. "What Do I Have to Do" (Extended Instrumental) – 5:08
- iTunes Digital EP – Remixes

(Not available at time of original release. Released for the first time as part of iTunes PWL archive release in 2009)

1. "What Do I Have to Do" (12" Instrumental)
2. "What Do I Have to Do" (7" Mix)
3. "What Do I Have to Do" (7" Backing Track)
4. "What Do I Have to Do" (7" Instrumental)
5. "What Do I Have to Do" (Album Backing Track)
6. "What Do I Have to Do" (Album Instrumental)
7. "What Do I Have to Do" (Between the Sheets Mix)
8. "What Do I Have to Do" (Extended Album Mix)
9. "What Do I Have to Do" (Movers & Shakers 12" Backing Track)
10. "What Do I Have to Do" (Movers & Shakers 12" Instrumental)
11. "What Do I Have to Do" (Movers & Shakers 7" Backing Track)
12. "What Do I Have to Do" (Movers & Shakers 7" Instrumental)
13. "What Do I Have to Do" (Movers & Shakers 7" Mix)
14. "What Do I Have to Do" (Movers & Shakers 12" Mix)
15. "What Do I Have to Do" (Movers & Shakers Do the Dub)
16. "What Do I Have to Do" (Pumpin' Mix)
- iTunes digital EP – The Original Synth Mixes (released 8 November 2010)
1. "What Do I Have to Do" (Billy The Fish Mix: Part I) – 3:44
2. "What Do I Have to Do" (Billy The Fish Mix: Part II) – 7:30
3. "What Do I Have to Do" (Original 12" Mix) – 7:09
4. "What Do I Have to Do" (Extended Album Mix II) – 8:42
- iTunes digital EP – What Do I Have to Do?
1. "What Do I Have to Do" (7" Mix) – 3:33
2. "What Do I Have to Do" (Pumpin' Mix) – 7:47
3. "What Do I Have to Do" (Extended Album Mix) – 8:07
4. "What Do I Have to Do" (7" Instrumental) – 3:33
5. "What Do I Have to Do" (Extended Instrumental) – 5:07
6. "What Do I Have to Do" (7" Backing Track) – 3:33
7. "What Do I Have to Do" (Album Instrumental) – 3:43
8. "What Do I Have to Do" (Album Backing Track) – 3:43
9. "Things Can Only Get Better" (Album Instrumental) – 3:55
10. "Things Can Only Get Better" (Album Backing Track) – 3:55

== Live performances ==
Minogue performed the song on the following concert tours:

- Rhythm of Love Tour
- Let's Get to It Tour
- Intimate and Live Tour
- On a Night Like This Tour
- Showgirl: The Greatest Hits Tour (as part of the "Smiley Kylie Medley")
- Showgirl: The Homecoming Tour (as part of the "Everything Taboo Medley")
- For You, for Me (as part of the "Everything Taboo Medley")
- Aphrodite World Tour
- Summer 2019
- Tension Tour

The song was also performed on:

- An Audience with Kylie Minogue 2001 TV special, performed as part of the hits medley.

== Charts ==
=== Weekly charts ===
Chart (1991)	Peak position
Australia (ARIA)	11
Belgium (Ultratop 50 Flanders)	15
Europe (Eurochart Hot 100)	24
Europe (European Hit Radio)	11
Finland (Suomen virallinen lista)	10
France (SNEP)	50
Germany (GfK)	48
Iceland (Íslenski Listinn Topp 10)	6
Ireland (IRMA)	7
Israel (Israeli Singles Chart)	1
Luxembourg (Radio Luxembourg)	7
Netherlands (Single Top 100)	81
UK Singles (Official Charts)	6
UK Airplay (Music Week)	5
UK Dance (Music Week)	49

=== Year-end charts ===
Chart (1991)	Position
Australia (ARIA)	90
Europe (European Hit Radio)	76
UK Singles (OCC)	74
