= Pauline Bennett =

- Born: August 1964 (age 61)
- Origin: Wolverhampton, England
- Genres: R&B, house, dance, hip hop
- Occupations: Rapper, dancer
- Instrument: Vocals
- Years active: 1982–present
- Labels: A&M, Arista/BMG

Pauline Bennett, who also goes by the stage name of Jazzi P, is a British DJ, dance teacher and rapper from Wolverhampton. She had a No. 6 hit as a featured artist on Kylie Minogue's 1991 song "Shocked", and also participated in Big Brother: Power Trip in 2014.

== Career ==
=== Music ===
Bennett has taught dance since the age of 11 creating a nightclub performing group at aged 14. Her rap career began with her dance group The Brutal Ladies in 1984 and was the first female hip hop/jazz DJ on a local pirate radio station, playing local clubs until she entered the DMC Rap Championships in 1988 and was spotted by Les Adams a.k.a. L.A. Mix. In 1989, she featured on L.A. Mix's UK No. 25 hit "Get Loose", which became a hit after L.A. Mix had been diagnosed by Stock, Aitken and Waterman as being "unlikely to score another hit" after their UK #6 hit "Check This Out". The following year, she had a solo hit with "Feel the Rhythm", which charted at No. 51 on the UK Singles Chart. In 1991, Jazzi rapped on the DNA song "Rebel Woman", which sampled David Bowie's "Rebel Rebel" and charted at No. 42 on the same chart.

Around the same time, DNA remixed Kylie Minogue's "Shocked" and added a rap part written and performed by Jazzi. The DNA Remix of the song was then released as a single (it was not originally planned for release) and charted at No. 6 on the UK Singles Chart, becoming Minogue's thirteenth consecutive top ten hit. Jazzi also performed the track on Top of the Pops. Bennett says she was only paid £200 for writing and performing the rap, and does not get any publishing royalties.

Jazzi told Minogue that previously she thought the singer's music was "shit". Many house tracks have used Jazzi's a cappellas for remixes and in 1994 Chris & James sampled "Feel the Rhythm" for their UK No. 74 hit "Calm Down (Bass Keeps Pumpin')". In 1991 after buying herself out of her record deal, she returned to teaching dance and building Wolverhampton's first community dance studio, Sweatbox.

=== 2014: Big Brother ===
Bennett participated in the fifteenth series of Big Brother UK, entering on Day 1 on 5 June 2014; she declared herself "an opinionated joker" and it was mis-stated that she had phobias of sea creatures and red meat. Her motto is "if it swims or flies I'll eat it, but if it goes clip clop, I'll think twice" She also noted that if she was not the first one to be evicted, she would be celebrating her fiftieth birthday in the house. She became the first housemate to be voted 'Power' housemate, enabling her to influence events; she was immediately asked to select one housemate for a treat and one for a punishment. She selected Mark for the treat – a £5,000 cash bonus – and selected Matthew for a punishment because she disagreed with some remarks he made about people with little intelligence. Matthew's punishment was to be excluded from the house for the first night. The next day, Bennett was asked to send a single housemate straight through to the final; she selected Helen. On Day 4, she was asked to hand out a Big Brother 'killer nomination', which meant that the selected housemate would automatically face eviction every week for the whole time they were in the house. She selected Jale on the grounds that she did not like her ways feeling that she was selfish and not a team player. Upon selecting her killer nomination, Bennett's tenure as Power housemate expired and fellow housemate Chris was selected; he nominated Pauline for the next eviction. A few days later, she had to be rushed to hospital to be treated for a burn. She became the second housemate to be evicted on Day 16 (with 79.4% of the public vote).
