= Better the Devil You Know =

1990 single by Kylie Minogue

Single by Kylie Minogue

from the album Rhythm of Love
- B-side: "I'm Over Dreaming (Over You)"
- Released: 30 April 1990
- Studio: PWL (London, England)
- Genre: Dance-pop
- Length: 3:58
- Label: Mushroom; PWL
- Songwriters: Mike Stock; Matt Aitken; Pete Waterman
- Producer: Stock Aitken Waterman

Kylie Minogue singles chronology
"Tears on My Pillow" (1990)	"Better the Devil You Know" (1990)	"Step Back in Time" (1990)

Music video
- "Better the Devil You Know" on YouTube

"Better the Devil You Know" is a song by Australian singer Kylie Minogue, taken from her third studio album Rhythm of Love (1990). The song was written and produced by Stock Aitken Waterman and was released as the album's lead single on 30 April 1990 by PWL and Mushroom Records. "Better the Devil You Know" is known as the song that re-invented Minogue with more sex appeal, as her previous albums were presented with her "girl next door" persona. Her music onwards presented a more independent approach.

The song's title is a reference to an idiom. Lyrically, the song was claimed by producer Pete Waterman to be about Minogue's relationship with her then-boyfriend, INXS frontman and singer Michael Hutchence. However, that is disputed by the song's primary composer, Mike Stock, who insists he was unaware of Kylie's private life at the time.

After becoming dissatisfied with her minimal creative role in making her first two albums, Minogue demanded creative veto on her new music, which was granted following her decision to work with other producers. She exercised her veto on early mixes of the single, and the track was then extensively reworked according to her stipulations.

The song was lauded by music critics, who noted the imagery change in her music. They also complimented the song itself and felt it was one of Minogue's best – a highlight of not just her studio album but her compilations as well. Commercially, it was successful. The song peaked at number two in the United Kingdom and four in her native Australia. In other regions, it managed to peak inside the top forty in all the countries it charted in, including France, Austria, Germany, Spain, Ireland, New Zealand, Sweden and Switzerland.

The accompanying music video for "Better the Devil You Know" was directed by Paul Goldman and was filmed in Melbourne, Australia. Though its imagery was criticised for her mature look, the video has also been iconic to Minogue's artistry, style and imagery beyond the song. The song has been featured in most of Minogue's concert tours. The song was later re-recorded in 2012 at the Abbey Road Studios for inclusion on Minogue's orchestral album The Abbey Road Sessions.

== Background and composition ==
"Better the Devil You Know" was written by Mike Stock, Matt Aitken and Pete Waterman (SAW), who also were the only producers and songwriters of Minogue's two albums after her debut. However, this album featured additional production by US producers, after Minogue became determined to exercise more creative control on her new album. Her manager, Terry Blamey, says the move was used to force creative concessions from SAW, who were worried about losing Minogue as an artist.

Originally conceived in a more percussion-heavy, R&B-influenced style, the track was significantly remixed and restructured by Pete Hammond, after Minogue rejected prior versions. He added a new verse by cutting up vocal segments and inserting additional effects. The first verse features notes spanning from A-C♯m-D-D2-Dm-E-Bm-D. When it reaches the chorus, the song spans from A-F♯m-A-D, and repeats everyline. When it reaches the bridge, the songs chords span from A-F♯m-A-F in each line. According to stylist William Baker in the book Kylie: La La La: "The song also featured a more mature sound, a more polished production and a vocal that was less layered than before." He added: "The track transferred well onto the dance-floor and heralded a long reign for Kylie as the new queen of disco... a pop princess".

== Critical reception ==
=== Initial response ===
"Better the Devil You Know" is one of Minogue's most famous singles, and ever since its release it has been lauded by music critics. David Giles from Music Week complimented SAW's songwriting, adding that it "seems to be growing increasingly sophisticated." He stated that "musically this is Kylie's best record by a mile, boosted by some invigorating chord changes and strong Seventies soul influence." Mike Soutar from Smash Hits felt that Minogue's voice is in "absolutely tip-top shape - there's no doubt she's a much improved singer these days." Jonathan Bernstein from Spin viewed it as a "knockout" pop single, that "mirrored her evolution from tomboy to dreamboat." Jason Shawahn from About.com said along with "What Do I Have To Do" and "Wouldn't Change A Thing"; "are nothing if not pop masterpieces." Hunter Felt from PopMatters said along with "Je Ne Sais Pas Pourquoi" and "Shocked" are pure pop moments. He then described it "as almost soulful rave-ups".

=== Impact and legacy ===
"Better the Devil You Know" is credited with maturing Minogue's music career and contributing substantially to ensuring its longevity, and is also noted as a major landmark in her relationship with her gay audience, by earning a place as a gay nightclub staple. In 1998, Australian record company Mushroom Records re-issued the song as part of their 25th Anniversary Celebrations. The re-issue reached number 59 on the Australian ARIA Charts in March 1998. In 2003, English music journalist Paul Morley included "Better the Devil You Know" in his list of "Greatest Pop Single of All Time".

In 2014, Matt Dunn of WhatCulture ranked the song at number two in his "15 unforgettable Stock Aitken Waterman singles" list. In 2021, British magazine Classic Pop ranked it number seven in their list of "Top 40 Stock Aitken Waterman songs", adding, "For many the moment Kylie went from virtuous pop star to racy nubile, Better The Devil You Know arrived in a mist of twirling dance-pop and palms-to-the-sky goodness, giving her a touch of avant class." In 2024, the same magazine ranked the song at number five in its list of "Top 40 Kylie Minogue songs", and noted that the lyric has drawn attention from darker quarters when vampiric Aussie Nick Cave defined it as "one of pop music's most violent and distressing love lyrics".

In 2020, Alexis Petridis of British daily newspaper The Guardian ranked the song at number four in his "Kylie's 30 greatest singles" list, adding that it proves that "Stock Aitken and Waterman could be masterful pop craftsmen" and described it "an effortlessly soaring melody, a perfect updating of disco's cocktail of jubilant music and lyrical heartbreak". In 2023, in the same newspaper, he listed the song at number four in his "Stock Aitken Waterman's 20 greatest songs – ranked!", adding that it "was a luxurious disco homage... The strings on the 12in version are particularly luscious, the lyrics slightly at odds with the utterly jubilant music". In 2023, Robert Moran of Australian daily tabloid newspaper The Sydney Morning Herald ranked the song as Minogue's fifth best song (out of 183), describing it "a classic", and added: "Kylie strains to rise above the wall of sound production (stuttering synths, piano fills, soaring strings and harmonies)". In 2025, Thomas Edward of Smooth Radio ranked the song fourth in his list of "Stock Aitken Waterman's 15 greatest songs, ranked".

== Chart performance ==
In the UK, "Better the Devil You Know" became Minogue's fifth non-consecutive number two single, being blocked by Adamski's "Killer". The song stayed at number two for two consecutive weeks, and spent a total of 10 weeks in the chart. It was certified silver by the British Phonographic Industry (BPI) having sold 340,000 copies. In Minogue's native Australia, the song debuted at five on the week end of 10 June 1990. The song peaked at number four in its third week on the chart and spent a total of thirteen weeks in the Top 50. It was certified gold by the Australian Recording Industry Association (ARIA) with sales exceeding 35,000 copies. However, in New Zealand the song was not a great success, debuting at number thirty-four, but falling out from number forty the next week, then re-entered at number twenty-seven, where it eventually peaked and charted for four weeks. In France, the song debuted at number thirty-eight, and after weeks on the chart it peaked at number thirteen for a single week. The song topped the charts in Israel and reached number eleven in Spain.

== Music video ==
The accompanying music video for "Better the Devil You Know" was directed by Paul Goldman and was filmed in Melbourne. The video caused some controversy as it presented Minogue in a much more mature image than videos from earlier years. The making of the video was the first time Minogue "felt part of the creative process". She said: "I wasn't in charge but I had a voice. I'd bought some clothes on King's Road for the video. I saw a new way to express my point of view creatively."

Goldman says that Minogue filmed the video in Australia to escape the creative oversight of her UK label, PWL. In the video, Minogue can be seen dancing more suggestively than in her previous efforts. At the time she was dating INXS singer Michael Hutchence, she is wearing one of his rings in the clip, a large silver 'M'. His mother, Patricia Glassop, a make up artist did the make up. The reaction of some at PWL to the video was strongly negative, with Goldman claiming he was slammed by a senior staff member for "fucking up" the video, damaging Kylie's image and, potentially, hurting her career.

== Live performances ==
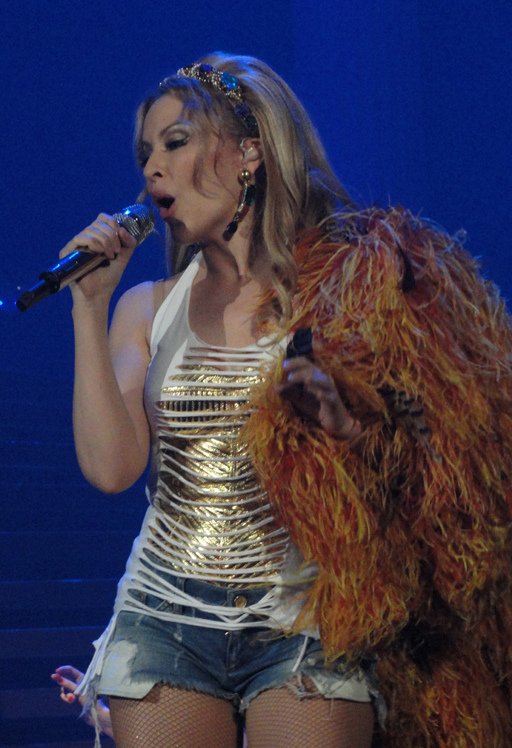
Minogue performing the song during her Aphrodite: Les Folies Tour in 2011

Since its debut in the Enjoy Yourself Tour, "Better the Devil You Know" has been performed at almost all of Minogue's tours. In the Enjoy Yourself, Rhythm of Love and Let's Get to It tours, the song was performed as the original as the encore to each show. The song was then performed as the encore on the Intimate and Live tour where Minogue wore a red corset with red devil horns. For the performance, an array of men dressed in red briefs entered the stage for the dance section of the song. On the On a Night Like This tour, a big band version was performed where Minogue was in full white with a tailcoat and a top hat. William Baker stated in the book "La La La" this was due to the recently released Steps version and to avoid post Spinning Around fans thinking Kylie's was the cover. In 2002, Minogue performed the song as the second-to-last song on her Fever tour.

This too featured a dance section, similar to the one performed on the Intimate and Live Tour. Minogue then opened her Showgirl Tour with the song. She wore a blue corset, a showgirl crown and a blue bussel. In 2006 and 2007, Minogue again opened her Homecoming Tour with the song this time dressed in pink. In 2008/09, the song was used in a pre-encore act of her KylieX2008 tour. She performed it wearing a green feather dress. This song was then dropped and placed in the regular encore. In 2009, the same version was then performed on her North American tour as the opening to the encore. The song's most recent performance was on Minogue's Aphrodite: Les Folies Tour in 2011. The song opened her seventh act where Minogue wore a white tank top, blue hot pants and an orange feathery throw over. This version included a dance interlude at the beginning which had a very Latin-pop feel. There was also a dance interlude in the middle with the same sort of feel. Kylie performed an a cappella version of the song in the Kiss Me Once Tour, after a fan request and the album version in Dubai which was later used as an opening for Minogue's Summer 2015 tour. In 2016, a remix of the song was later used as an opening for Minogue's festival shows. The song was performed once again during her Golden Tour in 2018 and her Summer 2019 Tour. The song was also performed on:

- An Audience with Kylie Minogue 2001 TV special, big band version performed with Adam Garcia.
- The X Factor UK, a duet with Leon Jackson in 2007 final.
- Alan Carr: Chatty Man, 2012, The Abbey Road Sessions version.

== Track listings ==
- CD single
1. "Better the Devil You Know" – 3:52
2. "Better the Devil You Know" (the Mad March Hare mix) – 7:09
3. "I'm Over Dreaming (Over You)" – 3:21
- 7-inch and cassette single

A. "Better the Devil You Know" – 3:52
B. "I'm Over Dreaming (Over You)" – 3:21

- 12-inch and maxi-cassette single

A. "Better the Devil You Know" (the Mad March Hare mix) – 7:09
B. "I'm Over Dreaming (Over You)" – 4:54

- Digital EP
1. "Better the Devil You Know" – 3:52
2. "Better the Devil You Know" (the Mad March Hare mix) – 7:06
3. "Better the Devil You Know" (Dave Ford remix) – 5:48
4. "Better the Devil You Know" (alternative mix) – 3:18
5. "Better the Devil You Know" (7-inch instrumental) – 3:52
6. "Better the Devil You Know" (7-inch backing track) – 3:52
7. "I'm Over Dreaming (Over You)" (remix) – 3:20
8. "I'm Over Dreaming (Over You)" (extended remix) – 4:54
9. "I'm Over Dreaming (Over You)" (remix instrumental) – 3:20
10. "I'm Over Dreaming (Over You)" (remix backing track) – 3:20

== Charts ==
=== Weekly charts ===
Chart (1990)	Peak position
Australia (ARIA)	4
Austria (Ö3 Austria Top 40)	27
Belgium (Ultratop 50 Flanders)	5
Denmark (IFPI)	6
Europe (Eurochart Hot 100)	6
Finland (Suomen virallinen lista)	7
France (SNEP)	13
Ireland (IRMA)	4
Israel (Israeli Singles Chart)	1
Luxembourg (Radio Luxembourg)	1
Netherlands (Dutch Top 40)	22
Netherlands (Single Top 100)	16
New Zealand (Recorded Music NZ)	27
Spain (AFYVE)	12
Sweden (Sverigetopplistan)	13
Switzerland (Schweizer Hitparade)	21
UK Singles (Official Charts)	2
West Germany (GfK)	24

Chart (1998)	Peak position
Australia (ARIA)	59

=== Year-end charts ===
Chart (1990)	Position
Australia (ARIA)	55
Belgium (Ultratop 50 Flanders)	19
Europe (Eurochart Hot 100)	36
Europe (European Airplay Top 50)	33
Israel (Israeli Singles Chart)	19
Sweden (Topplistan)	83
UK Singles (OCC)	38

== Certifications ==
Region	Certification	Certified units/sales
Australia (ARIA)	Platinum	70,000^{^}
United Kingdom (BPI)	Silver	340,000
^{^} Shipments figures based on certification alone.

== Steps version ==
"Better the Devil You Know"

Single by Steps

from the album Buzz
- A-side: "Say You'll Be Mine"
- Released: 13 December 1999
- Recorded: 1999
- Studio: PWL (London and Manchester, England)
- Length: 3:48
- Label: Jive
- Songwriter: Stock Aitken Waterman
- Producers: Pete Waterman; Mark Topham; Karl Twigg

Steps singles chronology
"After the Love Has Gone" (1999)	"Say You'll Be Mine" / "Better the Devil You Know" (1999)	"Deeper Shade of Blue" (2000)

Music video
- "Better the Devil You Know" on YouTube

British pop quintet Steps recorded a version of "Better the Devil You Know" for their sophomore studio album, Steptacular (1999). The song was also included on the North American edition (1999) of their debut album, Step One (1998), which featured a mixture of tracks from Step One and Steptacular. The song was eventually featured as the opening track of Steps' third album, Buzz (2000). "Better the Devil You Know" was released as a double A-side with the song "Say You'll Be Mine" in December 1999, the third release from Steptacular. A limited edition of the single was released as a digipack that included a doubled-sided poster in the sleeve: one side was the group pictured in their dance outfits, and the other shows the group in their costumes and different scenes from the music video.

The single peaked at No. 4 on the UK Singles Chart. Though it did not manage to match the global success of the original version, it did have some success, reaching No. 21 in Australia and charting in several European markets.

=== Track listing ===
1. "Say You'll Be Mine" – 3:32
2. "Better the Devil You Know" – 3:49
3. "Better the Devil You Know" (2T's 2 Go Mix) – 5:53

=== Credits and personnel ===
Credits are adapted from the liner notes of Buzz.

Recording

- Recorded in 1999 at PWL Studios (Manchester, England)
- Mixed in 1999 at PWL Studios (Manchester, England)
- Mastered at Transfermation (London, England)

Personnel

- Songwriting – Mike Stock, Matt Aitken, Pete Waterman
- Production – Mark Topham, Karl Twigg, Pete Waterman
- Mixing – Dan Frampton
- Engineering – Tim "Spag" Speight
- Drums – Dan Frampton
- Keyboards Karl Twigg
- Bass Mark Topham

=== Charts ===
==== Weekly charts ====
Chart (2000)	Peak position
Australia (ARIA)	21
Belgium (Ultratop 50 Flanders)	42
Netherlands (Single Top 100)	47
Switzerland (Schweizer Hitparade)	93
UK Singles (Official Charts)	4

==== Year-end charts ====
Chart (1999)	Position
UK Singles (OCC)	102

Chart (2000)	Position
UK Singles (OCC)	170

== Other cover versions ==
Australian singer Penny Flanagan recorded a cover version for the 1997 film Dust Off The Wings.

In 2009, European pop group Village Boys made a version of the song. In 2010, Miss Fitz, from Eurovision: Your Country Needs You, sang this song. Miss Fitz was also in The X Factor the year before but only made it to bootcamp stage.
