= DNA (duo) =

English electronic music production duo

- Origin: Bath, Somerset, England
- Genres: Electronic; trip hop; new jack swing; breakbeat
- Years active: 1988–1998
- Labels: EMI; Polydor
- Associated acts: Suzanne Vega; Kylie Minogue; Loreena McKennitt
- Past members: Neal Slateford; Nick Batt

DNA was an English electronic music production duo composed of Nick Batt and Neal Slateford, best known for releasing a remix of Suzanne Vega's "Tom's Diner" in 1990.

As well as "Tom's Diner", the duo remixed two other Suzanne Vega tracks: "Rusted Pipe" in 1991, and a radio mix of "Rosemary" in 2000. After a brief lull, the duo reappeared with a mix of the Loreena McKennitt track "The Mummers' Dance", which reached number one on the US Billboard Hot 100 Airplay chart in 1997.

Batt worked extensively with Goldfrapp on their albums Felt Mountain, Black Cherry and Supernature, receiving an Ivor Novello Award for co-writing the Black Cherry track "Strict Machine".

== Personnel ==
- Neal Slateford (born in Bath), co-founder of Lovehoney.
- Nick Batt (born Nicholas Batt, lives in Bath), now running the Sonic State music technology website and podcast.

== Discography and remixography ==
=== Albums ===
List of albums, with selected chart positions
Title	Album details	Peak chart positions
Title	Album details	AUS
Taste This	Released: 1992; Label: EMI	190

=== Singles ===
Year	Title	Peak chart positions												Album
Year	Title	UK	AUS	AUT	BEL (FL)	FRA	GER	IRE	ITA	NLD	NZ	SWI	US	Album
1990	"Tom's Diner" (featuring Suzanne Vega)	2	8	1	3	16	1	2	11	4	8	1	5	Singles only
1990	"La Serenissima"	34	—	—	—	15	18	—	—	—	—	—	—	Singles only
1991	"Rusted Pipe" (featuring Suzanne Vega) (Italy and United States promo only)	—	—	—	—	—	—	—	—	—	—	—	—	Singles only
1991	"Lily Was Here (DNA Remixes)" (David A. Stewart featuring Candy Dulfer) (US only)	—	—	—	—	—	—	—	—	—	—	—	11	Singles only
1991	"Forget Me Not$ (DNA Remix)" (by Tongue 'n' Cheek)	26	—	—	—	—	—	—	—	—	—	—	—	Singles only
1991	"Shocked (DNA Remix)" (by Kylie Minogue)	6	7	—	18	—	—	2	—	—	—	—	—	Singles only
1991	"Rebel Woman" (featuring Jazzi P)	42	—	—	—	—	—	—	—	—	—	—	—	Singles only
1992	"Can You Handle It" (featuring Sharon Redd)	17	172	—	—	—	—	29	—	62	41	—	—	Taste This
1992	"Blue Love (Call My Name)" (featuring Jo Nye)	66	—	—	—	—	—	—	—	—	—	—	—	Taste This
1992	"Summer Breeze (The DNA Mixes)" (by Geoffrey Williams)	56	—	—	—	—	—	—	—	—	32	—	—	Single only
"—" denotes releases that did not chart or were not released.

Other remixes:

- 1990: "Love and Affection" – Sinitta
- 1991: "Ride the Bullet" (Remix) – Army of Lovers (appears on the CD maxi-single of "Crucified")
- 1991: "Get the Message" (1991) – Electronic
- 1991: "Running Back to You" (Remix) – Vanessa L. Williams
- 1993: "Light of the World" (1993) – Kim Appleby
- 1995: "I Specialize in Love" – Exposé (remixed by Darrin Friedman, original found on 1992 album Exposé)
- 1997: "The Mummers' Dance" (Single version) – Loreena McKennitt
- 1998: "Coconut" – Dannii Minogue (remixed by Flexifinger, original found on The 1995 Sessions)
