= Greatest Hits: 87–99 =

2003 album by Kylie Minogue

Compilation album by Kylie Minogue
- Released: 3 December 2003
- Genre: Dance-pop
- Length: 122:03
- Label: Festival Mushroom
- Producer: Stock Aitken Waterman; Mike Duffy; DNA; Tony King; Asha Elfenbien; Brothers in Rhythm; Jimmy Harry; Tony Cohen; Victor Van Vugt; James Dean Bradfield; Dave Erigna; Dave Ball; Ingo Vauk; Nick Cave

Kylie Minogue chronology
| Greatest Hits 87–97 (2003) | Greatest Hits: 87–99 (2003) | Artist Collection (2004) |

Kylie Minogue video chronology
| Greatest Hits 87–97 (2003) | Greatest Hits: 87–99 (2003) | Body Language Live (2004) |

Greatest Hits: 87–99 is a 2003 compilation album by Australian singer Kylie Minogue. The album was a budget release, released only in Australia around the same time as Minogue's ninth studio album Body Language. The track list is an extension of her 1992 Greatest Hits compilation, adding the singles released during the Deconstruction period (1994–1998). The album also includes a cover of Russell Morris' song "The Real Thing", recorded in 1999. The accompanying DVD (titled Greatest Hits 87–98) features every Minogue music video released during the PWL and Deconstruction years (the only Minogue DVD to do so). However, some videos, like the Australian video for "Locomotion" and the full-length version of "Where Is The Feeling?” are not featured.

== Track listing ==
All songs on disc one written and produced by Mike Stock, Matt Aitken and Pete Waterman, except where noted.

Disc one
| No. | Title | Writer(s) | Producer(s) | Length |
|---|---|---|---|---|
| 1. | "Locomotion^{[a]}" (Australian version; album version) | Gerry Goffin; Carole King | Mike Duffy | 3:14 |
| 2. | "I Should Be So Lucky^{[a]}" | | | 3:23 |
| 3. | "Got to Be Certain^{[a]}" | | | 3:20 |
| 4. | "Je ne sais pas pourquoi^{[a]}" | | | 4:01 |
| 5. | "Especially for You^{[b]}" (with Jason Donovan) | | | 3:58 |
| 6. | "Turn It into Love^{[a]}" | | | 3:36 |
| 7. | "Made in Heaven^{[c]}" | | | 3:32 |
| 8. | "It's No Secret^{[a]}" | | | 3:59 |
| 9. | "Hand on Your Heart^{[d]}" | | | 3:51 |
| 10. | "Wouldn't Change a Thing^{[d]}" | | | 3:14 |
| 11. | "Never Too Late^{[d]}" | | | 3:23 |
| 12. | "Tears on My Pillow^{[d]}" | Sylvester Bradford; Al Lewis | | 2:28 |
| 13. | "Better the Devil You Know^{[e]}" | | | 3:55 |
| 14. | "Step Back in Time^{[e]}" | | | 3:05 |
| 15. | "What Do I Have to Do?^{[e]}" (7" mix) | | | 3:33 |
| 16. | "Shocked^{[e]}" (DNA 7" mix featuring Jazzi P) | Mike Stock; Matt Aitken; Pete Waterman; Pauline Bennett | Stock Aitken Waterman; DNA | 3:10 |
| Total length: | | | | 55:34 |

Disc two
| No. | Title | Writer(s) | Producer(s) | Length |
|---|---|---|---|---|
| 1. | "Word Is Out^{[f]}" (Summer Breeze 7" mix) | Stock; Waterman | Stock; Waterman; Tony King; Asha Elfenbien | 3:34 |
| 2. | "If You Were with Me Now^{[f]}" (with Keith Washington) | Stock; Waterman; Kylie Minogue; Keith Washington | Stock; Waterman | 3:11 |
| 3. | "Give Me Just a Little More Time^{[f]}" | Edyth Wayne; Ronald Dunbar | Stock; Waterman | 3:07 |
| 4. | "Finer Feelings^{[f]}" (Brothers in Rhythm 7" mix) | Stock; Waterman | Stock; Waterman; Brothers in Rhythm | 3:47 |
| 5. | "What Kind of Fool (Heard All That Before)^{[g]}" | Stock; Waterman; Minogue | Stock; Waterman | 3:41 |
| 6. | "Celebration^{[g]}" | Robert Bell; James Taylor | Phil Harding; Ian Curnow | 3:57 |
| 7. | "Confide in Me^{[h]}" (Master mix) | Steve Anderson; Dave Seaman; Owain Barton | Brothers in Rhythm | 5:51 |
| 8. | "Put Yourself in My Place^{[h]}" (Australian radio edit) | Jimmy Harry | Harry | 3:36 |
| 9. | "Where Is the Feeling?^{[h]}" (BIR Dolphin mix) | Wilf Smarties; Jayn Hanna | Brothers in Rhythm | 4:11 |
| 10. | "Where the Wild Roses Grow^{[i]}" (With Nick Cave) | Nick Cave | Tony Cohen; Victor Van Vugt | 3:58 |
| 11. | "Some Kind of Bliss^{[j]}" | Minogue; James Dean Bradfield; Sean Moore | Dave Eringa; Bradfield | 4:14 |
| 12. | "Did It Again^{[j]}" | Minogue; Anderson; Seaman | Brothers in Rhythm | 4:16 |
| 13. | "Breathe^{[j]}" (Radio edit) | Minogue; Dave Ball; Ingo Vauk | Ball; Vauk | 3:39 |
| 14. | "Cowboy Style^{[j]}" (Radio edit) | Minogue; Anderson; Seaman | Brothers in Rhythm | 3:51 |
| 15. | "Dancing Queen^{[k]}" (7" edit) | Benny Andersson; Björn Ulvaeus; Stig Anderson | | 3:48 |
| 16. | "Tears^{[l]}" | Minogue; Ball; Vauk | Ball; Vauk | 4:26 |
| 17. | "The Real Thing^{[m]}" | | | 3:22 |
| Total length: | | | | 66:29 |

DVD
| No. | Title | Length |
|---|---|---|
| 1. | "The Loco-Motion" (UK video) |
| 2. | "I Should Be So Lucky" |
| 3. | "Got to Be Certain" |
| 4. | "Je ne sais pas pourquoi" |
| 5. | "Especially for You" |
| 6. | "It's No Secret" |
| 7. | "Made in Heaven" |
| 8. | "Hand on Your Heart" |
| 9. | "Wouldn't Change a Thing" |
| 10. | "Never Too Late" |
| 11. | "Tears on My Pillow" |
| 12. | "Better the Devil You Know" |
| 13. | "Step Back in Time" |
| 14. | "What Do I Have to Do" |
| 15. | "Shocked" |
| 16. | "Word Is Out" (UK video) |
| 17. | "If You Were with Me Now" |
| 18. | "Give Me Just a Little More Time" |
| 19. | "Finer Feelings" |
| 20. | "What Kind of Fool (Heard All That Before)" |
| 21. | "Celebration" |
| 22. | "Confide in Me" |
| 23. | "Put Yourself in My Place" |
| 24. | "Where Is the Feeling?" (short video) |
| 25. | "Where the Wild Roses Grow" |
| 26. | "Some Kind of Bliss" |
| 27. | "Did It Again" |
| 28. | "Breathe" |
| 29. | "Cowboy Style" |

=== Notes ===
- ^{^a} from Kylie, 1988.
- ^{^b} from Ten Good Reasons, 1989.
- ^{^c} B-side to Je ne sais pas pourquoi single, 1988.
- ^{^d} from Enjoy Yourself, 1989
- ^{^e} from Rhythm of Love, 1990
- ^{^f} from Let's Get to It, 1991
- ^{^g} from Greatest Hits, 1992
- ^{^h} from Kylie Minogue, 1994
- ^{^i} from Murder Ballads, 1996
- ^{^j} from Impossible Princess, 1997
- ^{^k} from Intimate and Live, 1998
- ^{^l} B-side to Did It Again single, 1997
- ^{^m} from Sample People soundtrack, 2000

== Personnel ==
Adapted from the album's liner notes.

- Ellen Von Unwerth – photography
- Katrina Jebb – photography
- Tony Hung – cover design
- Traffic Design Studios – cover design, package design

== Charts ==
Chart performance for Greatest Hits: 87–99
| Chart (2003–2004) | Peak position |
|---|---|
| Australian Albums (ARIA) | 54 |

== Certifications ==
Certifications for Greatest Hits: 87–99
| Region | Certification | Certified units/sales |
|---|---|---|
| Australia (ARIA) DVD | 2× Platinum | 30,000^{^} |
^{^} Shipments figures based on certification alone.
