= Intimate and Live (album) =

1998 album by Kylie Minogue

Live album by Kylie Minogue
- Released: 30 November 1998
- Recorded: 1 July 1998
- Genres: Pop rock; dance-pop
- Length: 106:00
- Labels: BMG; Mushroom; Warner Vision
- Director: Mark Adamson
- Producer: David Wilson

Kylie Minogue chronology
Greatest Remix Hits (1998)	Intimate and Live (1998)	Light Years (2000)

Kylie Minogue video chronology
Live in Sydney (2001)	Intimate and Live (2002)	KylieFever2002: Live in Manchester (2002)

Intimate and Live is the debut live album by Australian singer and songwriter Kylie Minogue. It was released on 30 November 1998 as a double CD set, and on 23 July 2002 as a DVD through BMG, Mushroom Records and Warner Vision. The concert was filmed at Capitol Theatre on 1 July 1998 from the Intimate and Live concert tour. Produced by David Wilson and directed by Mark Adamson and Michael Williams, both the album and DVD features twenty-one songs from the concert and spawned a promotional single, "Dancing Queen".

The tour was in support of Minogue's sixth studio album Impossible Princess, playing eight songs from the album. The album received positive reviews for Minogue's clear delivery with slight criticism towards the covers, the DVD edition received mixed reviews from music critics for its visuals and stage production. The album reached number twenty-eight on the Australian Albums Chart, her first and highest live album to chart alongside the 2007 live album Showgirl: Homecoming Live respectively. The DVD peaked at number one and was certified platinum by the Australian Recording Industry Association (ARIA) for shipments of 15,000 units.

== Background and material ==
The album and DVD were recorded and filmed on 1 July 1998 at the Capitol Theatre in Sydney, Australia from the Intimate and Live concert tour. The photography used on the front cover was by Campbell Knott, while one image in the booklet is shot by Natalie Stevenson. Both the album and DVD cover sleeve was designed by Andrew Murabito, who worked directly through Mushroom for specialised artworks and cover designs. Both Minogue's creative designers, British musician and producer Steve Anderson and British fashion designer William Baker, produced the album and DVD, who at the time had no experience in touring or producing a live album. Despite this, both Anderson and Baker carried on producing her live work in the future.

The CD was released through Mushroom on 28 November 1998. It contains eight tracks from the supporting album Impossible Princess; "Too Far", "Some Kind of Bliss", "Breathe", "Cowboy Style", "Say Hey", "Drunk", "Did It Again", "Limbo" and two unreleased tracks "Free" and "Take Me With You", alongside previous material. In addition, Minogue performed two cover songs on the tour; "Dancing Queen" by Swedish group ABBA and "Should I Stay or Should I Go?" by American group The Clash. To promote the tour subsequently, Minogue and her Australian label Mushroom Records released "Dancing Queen" as a promotional single which also included the live version of "Cowboy Style". The VHS of the concert was released a month later through Roadshow Entertainment and Mushroom, featuring all twenty-one tracks from the album. The reverse spiral dual layer (RSDL) DVD was released on 23 July 2002 through Warner Vision and BMG in Australia, New Zealand and the United Kingdom, and featured all twenty-one tracks from the album. The video footage for "Cowboy Style" was used as its official music video, which was directed by Michael Williams.

== Reception ==
Professional ratings
Review scores
Source	Rating
Allmusic	3/5 stars
The Independent	(Positive)

Intimate and Live received favorable reviews from most music critics. While reviewing the concert tour and the CD/DVD versions, a reviewer from The Independent called the live performance "fantastic". The reviewer felt songs like "I Should be So Lucky" was "not only an inspired arrangement, but Kylie even sang it well: the helium she overdosed on in the late 1980s has worn off." Allmusic editor Chris True had highlighted tracks "Too Far", "What Do I Have to Do?" and "Limbo" as album stand outs. Although he rated it three stars and called the music "solid", he felt "her soft dance-pop version of the Clash's "Should I Stay or Should I Go?" is downright awful. Mainly for die-hard collectors, less familiar fans will want to check out a greatest-hits compilation or her 1997 album Impossible Princess." An editor from JB Hi-Fi had praised the DVD version, feeling she was "all grown up" and "Kylie truly was the prom-queen and this really was her homecoming." Pete Mellor from Michael DVD.co.au awarded the album three-and-a-half stars out of four, and the DVD two-and-a-half. For the album, he commended the quality by saying it was "clear" and was "able to understand", while he criticized the colour saturation and staging of the show and editing.

Due to the positive reception and success of the tour, Minogue had written an open note on the album booklet;

This tour was an experience I will always treasure. My heartfelt thanks to absolutely everyone who was involved. Your belief and enthusiasm were more than I could have wished for. Please know that I couldn't have done this and ejoyed it so much without each and every one of you. My thanks also to the audiences who thrilled us every night and filled me with joy. May we all meet again...

== Commercial performance ==
Intimate and Live entered at number twenty-eight on the Australian Albums Chart, dropping to forty-six the following week, and falling out the chart. On 3 January 1999, the album re-entered at forty-one and stayed in the charts for four weeks. As a conjunction, Intimate and Live and Minogue's 2007 live album Showgirl: Homecoming Live are her highest charting live albums and her only live albums to chart in Australia. The DVD version peaked at number one in Australia and was certified platinum by the Australian Recording Industry Association (ARIA) with shipments of 15,000 units.

== Track listings ==
Disc 1
No.	Title	Writer(s)	Length
1.	"Too Far"	Kylie Minogue	6:57
2.	"What Do I Have to Do"	Mike Stock; Matt Aitken; Pete Waterman	4:20
3.	"Some Kind of Bliss"	Minogue; James Dean Bradfield; Sean Moore	4:07
4.	"Put Yourself in My Place"	Jimmy Harry	4:51
5.	"Breathe"	Minogue; Dave Ball; Ingo Vauk	4:05
6.	"Take Me With You"	Minogue	6:29
7.	"I Should Be So Lucky"	Stock; Aitken; Waterman	4:00
8.	"Dancing Queen"	Benny Andersson; Björn Ulvaeus; Stig Anderson	6:00
9.	"Dangerous Game"	Steve Anderson; Dave Seaman	5:34
10.	"Cowboy Style"	Minogue; Steve Anderson; Seaman	6:28
Total length:			52:51

Disc 2
No.	Title	Writer(s)	Length
1.	"Step Back in Time"	Stock; Aitken; Waterman	3:36
2.	"Say Hey"	Minogue	4:10
3.	"Free"	Minogue	4:01
4.	"Drunk"	Minogue; Steve Anderson; Seaman	4:21
5.	"Did It Again"	Minogue; Steve Anderson; Seaman	5:18
6.	"Limbo"	Minogue; Ball; Vauk	4:10
7.	"Shocked"	Stock; Aitken; Waterman; Pauline Bennett	5:38
8.	"Confide in Me"	Steve Anderson; Seaman; Owain Barton	6:26
9.	"Locomotion"	Gerry Goffin; Carole King	3:20
10.	"Should I Stay or Should I Go"	Topper Headon; Mick Jones; Paul Simonon; Joe Strummer	4:29
11.	"Better the Devil You Know"	Stock; Aitken; Waterman	7:46
Total length:			53:15

DVD
No.	Title	Length
1.	"Video Introduction"	1:22
2.	"Too Far"	6:31
3.	"What Do I Have to Do?"	4:22
4.	"Some Kind of Bliss"	3:33
5.	"Behind the Scenes Footage 1"	5:24
6.	"Put Yourself in My Place"	4:57
7.	"Breathe"	4:09
8.	"Take Me With You"	6:20
9.	"I Should Be So Lucky"	4:01
10.	"Dancing Queen"	5:50
11.	"Dangerous Game"	5:31
12.	"Cowboy Style Interlude"	1:15
13.	"Cowboy Style"	4:59
14.	"Step Back in Time"	3:28
15.	"Say Hey"	4:29
16.	"Free"	3:54
17.	"Drunk"	4:14
18.	"Did It Again"	4:16
19.	"Limbo"	4:06
20.	"Shocked"	5:16
21.	"Behind the Scenes Footage 2"	2:44
22.	"Confide in Me"	6:56
23.	"Locomotion"	3:16
24.	"Should I Stay or Should I Go"	4:37
25.	"Better the Devil You Know"	7:25
26.	"Credits"	2:58
Total length:		114:52

Formats

- CD and digital download – double disc containing two live CD's.
- DVD – DVD keep case packed with the DVD.
- Video download – The live performances of the tour. (Note: Only two songs had broadcast on the iTunes Store; "Dancing Queen" and "Cowboy Style". However, the live performance of "Cowboy Style" was used as the official music video when the song was released.)

== Personnel ==
Adapted from the album liner notes.

- Mark Adamson - director
- Michael Warden - editing
- Rob Fazzino - editing
- Tim Parrington - editing
- Alan 'Ternits' Bremner - mixing
- David Wilson - producer
- Ross Cockle - recording
- Andrew Murabito - sleeve design

== Charts ==
Chart (1998; CD)	Peak position
Australian Albums (ARIA)	28
Chart (1998–2002; DVD)	Peak position
Australian Albums (ARIA)	1
UK Music Videos (OCC)	44

== Certifications ==
Region	Certification	Certified units/sales
Australia (ARIA)	Platinum	15,000^{^}
^{^} Shipments figures based on certification alone.
