= Intimate and Live (tour) =

1998 concert tour by Kylie Minogue

- Tour by Kylie Minogue
- Promotional poster for the tour, signed by Minogue
- Location: Oceania; Europe
- Associated album: Impossible Princess
- Start date: 2 June 1998
- End date: 31 July 1998
- Legs: 2
- No. of shows: 23

Kylie Minogue concert chronology
- Let's Get to It Tour (1991); Intimate and Live (1998); On a Night Like This (2001)

Intimate and Live was the fifth concert tour by Australian recording artist Kylie Minogue, in support of her sixth studio album, Impossible Princess (1997). The tour marked a return to touring for Minogue, with her previous tour Let's Get to It Tour (1991) taking place seven years prior.

The shows were divided into four parts; Impossible Princess, Showgirl, Cowgirl and an encore. The first featured Minogue appearing inside a multi-colored cone replicating the album cover, the second was inspired by Showgirl props and costumes, the third incorporated cowboy-influenced props and a K symbol, and the fourth and final is an encore performance for "Better the Devil You Know". The tour garnered positive appreciation from music critics and commercial success. Tickets sold out as soon as dates and venues for the tour were announced, prompting the organisers to add more dates. Despite initial plans to not bring the tour overseas, Minogue decided to add three UK dates at Shepherd's Bush Empire.

A live album and DVD of the concert tour was released in November 1998 and July 2003 respectively.

== Background ==
Kylie Minogue embarked a promotional tour in the Asia-Pacific region in late 1997. Minogue performed in Singapore and then followed with Australian state capitals Melbourne, Brisbane, Sydney and Adelaide. Next was Auckland and she finished in Hong Kong. After the albums European release, she went on to promote the album in Norway, Denmark and the Netherlands. Both Baker and Anderson, the latter who to this day is Minogue's creative director, were inexperienced with touring. Anderson appeared with Minogue for the first time at the 1998 Sydney Mardi Gras, but Baker was absent. Baker was anxious to tour for the first time and "did not know what to expect."

In October 1997, Minogue released her sixth studio album Impossible Princess. It became Minogue's first album on which she had complete creative control on songwriting and composing. The album divided critics, many who commended its experimental and adventurous nature, while criticism was primarily directed towards her image. The album peaked at number four on the ARIA Albums Chart and number one on the Australian Music Report chart in January 1998. Impossible Princess peaked at number ten on the UK Albums Chart. Minogue returned to Australia in early 1998 to prepare for her Australian tour. Minogue's creative director and longtime friend William Baker was in Dubai with Steve Anderson, guitarist Carl Mann and percussionist James Mark. They were discussing the tour that they had booked in May 1998, wanting to hire more musicians and dancers.

== Development and production ==
Minogue's first rehearsal was in Fitzroy, Melbourne, Australia. Minogue and Baker had started drawing stage concepts of how the tour would look like and wanted it to reflect onto the album's personal meaning. Objects in the album's content, including the "K" symbol and the multi-coloured cone, had been featured on the tour. Baker was discussing about the concepts and production of the tour, and felt that "there was something special and unique about Intimate and Live, a coming-of-age Kylie and her team." Baker felt Minogue's innovation with the crew of the tour would have "enabled" her to "shine on stage like a true star." The stage was largely based on Impossible Princess but Baker and Minogue wanted to create something that would "take the audience on a journey and tease them with the unexpected, playing with their preconceptions."

Minogue felt she needed to "lighten up" and have fun on tour, rid from all the criticism and what the public said about her. Anderson, Minogue and Baker originally confirmed that they would not tour in the United Kingdom, but Baker commented that they were "so liberated by the British commercial failure, feeling that now we had nothing to lose." They decided to extend it into the UK only due to high demand. Minogue and Baker had collaborated with several photographers (including Baker) so they could use pictures to advertise the tour; one of the shots featured Minogue in a cow-boy hat and a pink background, which is similar to the "Cowboy Style" artwork. Deconstruction Records and Sony BMG were not in control of the tour, so Baker and Anderson took control of bookings and organisation.

For venues, Baker and Minogue intended to perform at small theatres in order to create a personal atmosphere between Minogue, the crew and the audience. This idea was to thank the audience for their support through the Impossible Princess era, hence the titling of "Intimate". Minogue, Baker and Anderson searched several venues that had an approximate capacity of 2,000. However, Minogue was still "worried about filling" the smaller venues after the backlash.

== Costumes and listing ==
Baker and Minogue had both designed the outfits for the tour, with the showgirl design being the first costume. The tour costumes were inspired by "princess" outfits and Minogue wanted to have several props to incorporate different influences while performing. Minogue wanted to take "risks" with the outfits and appearances on tour, so she decided to keep her longer hair that was not present on the promotion shoots of Impossible Princess. Baker felt that her public image had "endured" and evolved severely from her "gritty black-and-white" "Some Kind of Bliss" days.

The track list was made jointly by Baker, Anderson and Minogue. From the supporting album, Minogue performed "Too Far", "Some Kind of Bliss", "Breathe", "Cowboy Style", "Say Hey", "Drunk", "Did It Again", "Limbo" and two unreleased tracks; "Take Me With You" and "Free". Originally out of the setlist the cover version of "Should I Stay or Should I Go?" by The Clash was added to the track list after Minogue had performed the track live on The Ben Elton Show.Later, Minogue had added her cover version of "Dancing Queen" in the set list.

== Concert synopsis ==
Minogue performing "Dancing Queen" in Melbourne

The concert opens with a multi-coloured opened cone, similar to the artwork of Impossible Princess. For that, she performed the first act of songs with "Too Far" being the opener. Minogue was dressed in a black shirt and black trousers, and walked through a temple-like staircase during the set. The outfit was derived from the video of "Did it Again", but Minogue decided to re-design the outfit. The backdrop projections of "Take Me With You" featured a rolling storm. During the second act, Minogue opens with "I Should Be So Lucky" in a pink and glitter showgirl outfit in front of a giant glittery "K", decorated with white fairy lights. The torch version of the song was then led into "Dancing Queen", a cover version originally performed by Swedish group ABBA and "Dangerous Game".

The third act opens with "Cowboy Style", showing Minogue in a black dress, pink belt and a pink cowboy hat. The next song was "Step Back in Time" and Minogue removed her cowboy hat for the rest of the segment. She performed the tracks "Say Hey", "Drunk" and "Free". The projection for "Free" was an ongoing open road. For the fourth segment, Minogue arrived in crop top and black pants for "Did it Again", and performed "Limbo" and "Shocked" for this segment. Minogue "reclined" from the staircase for "Confide in Me" in the fifth segment, wanting to "graceful" for the opening of that segment. After performing the tracks "The Locomotion" and "Should I Stay or Should I Go?", Minogue returned for an encore to perform "Better the Devil You Know" in a showgirl-devil costume, complete with devil horns.

== Reception ==
Intimate and Live received positive reviews from music critics. Darrin Farrant from The Age wrote "No more "Singing Budgie" cracks. Minogue proved in her first official, public gig in Melbourne in seven years that the doubters were wrong: she can sing and she also knows how to put on a sensational show." He favored the Impossible Princess tracks for giving more "vocal flair." Despite favorable reviews in Australia, Minogue and Baker were worried about the reception in the UK. Minogue and Baker had suffered from depression during the time, and worried that they would turn up to the concerts to "emptiness." Jeff Kennett, who was the 43rd Premier of Victoria, congratulated Minogue at the end of her Australian leg, calling her a "wonderful ambassador for Australia wherever she travels,".

Performing at the Shepherd's Bush Empire, the tour received rave reviews from most music critics and Baker commented that "perhaps slightly altering London's perception that Kylie was over." Melody Maker writer David Benedict wrote that none of her recent music was exciting, and said "Her audience may be loyal, but they're also deeply conservative; none of the recent singles have delivered like the mega-hits of yore and tonight the newer material has a comparatively muted reception." However, he said that all "changed", labeling it a "blinding show" and "so much fun", and said that was some "Kylie does best." Victoria Sega from NME gave it a mixed review. She wrote "There are moments of boredom – indistinguishable balladry that's not so much torch-song drama as fluorescent-tube flash [...]" However, she concluded saying "yet Kylie loves this, she lives for it, and she damns all those svengalis with one twist of her knife-edge heels." She had prospected that Minogue "will be back." Baker viewed felt that Minogue's fans were loyal due to her "pop songs" which he exemplified "Better the Devil You Know" and "Dancing Queen".

In retrospect, Bradley Stern from NewNowNext highlighted the live performance "What Do I Have to Do?" as the best song at the show, and listed the performance at number three on their Kylie Minogue In Concert: 8 Amazing Live Performances. Luke Dennehy from Herald Sun wrote an article about the show in March 2015, and said "She certainly did deliver, it was spectacular success." He went on to say "The press at the time called it her homecoming tour, our very own pop princess was back, and for the first time she was truly critically acclaimed for her performance [...] But for many reasons, that tour was so important Kylie and how we see her now ... and of course for her loyal legions of fans out there." The shows had sold out in all of Australia in under ten minutes. Minogue did not plan to tour England, but due to public pressure, she staged three small shows in London.

== Broadcasts and recordings ==
The show was filmed at the Capitol Theatre, Sydney, on 30 June and 1 July 1998. In November 1998, Mushroom Records released the live album with the same name as the tour in Australia and New Zealand as a cassette and double-CD set. The concert was released onto DVD on 23 July 2002 by Mushroom in Australia and New Zealand. The sleeve design was handled by Andrew Murabito at Mushroom Art and Baker was the creative designer. A VHS was issued in Australia only. "Dancing Queen" appeared on her 2002 greatest hits album Greatest Hits 87-99.

== Set list ==
Set list and samples adapted per the official track listing of Intimate and Live. It does not represent all shows.

Act I: Indie Kylie

1. "Too Far" (contains elements of the Brothers in Rhythm dub mix)
2. "What Do I Have to Do"
3. "Some Kind of Bliss"
4. "Put Yourself in My Place"
5. "Breathe"
6. "Take Me With You" (from the Impossible Princess sessions)

Act II: Cute Kylie

7. "I Should Be So Lucky" (Torch version)
8. "Dancing Queen"
9. "Dangerous Game"

Act III: Sexy Kylie

10. "Cowboy Style"
11. "Step Back in Time"
12. "Say Hey"
13. "Free" (from the Impossible Princess sessions)
14. "Drunk"

Act IV: Dance Kylie

15. "Did It Again"
16. "Limbo"
17. "Shocked"

Encore I

18. "Confide in Me"
19. "The Loco-Motion"
20. "Should I Stay or Should I Go"

Encore II

21. "Better the Devil You Know"

== Tour dates ==
List of concerts
Date (1998)	City	Country	Venue	Opening act
2 June	Melbourne	Australia	Palais Theatre	—N/a
3 June	Melbourne	Australia	Palais Theatre	—N/a
4 June	Melbourne	Australia	Palais Theatre	—N/a
6 June	Brisbane	Australia	Brisbane Entertainment Centre	—N/a
8 June	Sydney	Australia	Capitol Theatre	—N/a
9 June	Sydney	Australia	Capitol Theatre	—N/a
10 June	Sydney	Australia	Capitol Theatre	—N/a
11 June	Sydney	Australia	Capitol Theatre	—N/a
14 June	Adelaide	Australia	Thebarton Theatre	—N/a
15 June	Adelaide	Australia	Thebarton Theatre	—N/a
17 June	Melbourne	Australia	Palais Theatre	—N/a
18 June	Melbourne	Australia	Palais Theatre	—N/a
20 June	Sydney	Australia	State Theatre	—N/a
21 June	Sydney	Australia	State Theatre	—N/a
22 June	Sydney	Australia	State Theatre	—N/a
27 June	Newcastle	Australia	Newcastle Entertainment Centre	—N/a
29 June	Canberra	Australia	Royal Theatre	—N/a
1 July	Sydney	Australia	Capitol Theatre	—N/a
3 July	Melbourne	Australia	Palais Theatre	—N/a
4 July	Melbourne	Australia	Palais Theatre	—N/a
29 July	London	England	Shepherd's Bush Empire	Maria Nayler
30 July	London	England	Shepherd's Bush Empire	Maria Nayler
31 July	London	England	Shepherd's Bush Empire	Maria Nayler

== Personnel ==
- Tarcoola Touring Company Pty.Ltd. – producer
- Terry Blamey – executive producer, management
- Steve Anderson – music production
- Chong Lim – musician director
- Brian Thompson – set design
- Steven Swift – lighting design
- William Baker – creative design
- Kylie Minogue – creative design
- Nick Pitts – tour manager
- Warren Anderson – assistant tour manager
- Natalie Stevenson – assistant
- Kevin Murphy – hair and makeup
- Carol Minogue – wardrobe
- William Forsythe – choreographer

=== Band ===
- Chong Lim – keyboards
- Joe Creighton – bass, vocals
- Stuart Fraser – guitar
- Carl Mann – guitar
- Angus Burchall – drums
- James Mack – percussion
- Lisa Edwards – backing vocals
- Natalie Miller – backing vocals
- David Scotchford – dancer
- Ashley Wallen – dancer
