= KylieFever2002 =

2002 tour by Kylie Minogue

- Tour by Kylie Minogue
- Promotional poster for the German dates of the tour
- Location: Europe; Oceania
- Associated album: Fever
- Start date: 26 April 2002
- End date: 16 August 2002
- Legs: 2
- No. of shows: 49

Kylie Minogue concert chronology
- On a Night Like This (2001); KylieFever2002 (2002); Showgirl: The Greatest Hits Tour (2005)

KylieFever2002 was the seventh concert tour by Australian pop singer Kylie Minogue, in-support of her eighth studio album, Fever (2001). The tour began on 26 April 2002 at the Cardiff International Arena in Wales, concluding on 16 August 2002 at Melbourne's Rod Laver Arena, playing a total of 38 shows in Europe and 11 in Australia.

The eighth date of the tour, the 4 May 2002 concert at Manchester's Evening News Arena, was filmed and broadcast live on MSN, and was subsequently released on DVD as KylieFever2002: Live in Manchester (with a bonus CD).

== Background ==
The tour was the biggest production Minogue had put on at that time. The album and its music videos were able to provide and inspire multiple stage sets and costume changes, the first of its kind to use projection. The tour had a much larger budget than past shows due to the success of the album and its singles. Due to the increase in money the stage sets were able to become much grander with two staircases and five projection screens which were used to enhance the different themes of the show.

The costumes for the show were designed exclusively for Minogue by Italian designers Dolce & Gabbana. The choreographer for the tour was Rafael Bonachela.

It was Minogue's first tour to have sponsors, which were Evian and Vodafone. At each of the UK shows, sponsors Evian gave away free bottles of water, the packaging for which replaced the Evian branding with the name 'Kylie'. Bottles were also marked with the words, "Evian – Kylie's official thirst quencher for the 2002 Fever Tour".

As the album's lead single began to grow in the U.S., Minogue devoted time before the tour to promote the song and album. Minogue's visit sparked rumours of a tour in the States. Rumours spread of bandmembers and dancers applying for U.S. work visas. According to Capitol Records president Andy Slater, a U.S. tour has not been discussed. Minogue commented on her reluctance to tour the States. She felt the American audience wouldn't "get" her live shows and wouldn't know her back catalogue. Despite rumours of a North American leg, plans never developed due to Minogue's status in that country. During the time, British magazine Hello reported a U.S. tour had been cancelled, so that Minogue could focus on her personal life. It was later revealed Minogue was swayed differently by her management. However, Minogue did tour the U.S. with Jingle Ball, an annual concert produced on by KIIS-FM, visiting Anaheim, Houston, Miami, Philadelphia and New York City. For the Jingle Ball shows, Minogue performed five songs from the set list of the tour: "Come into My World", "Love at First Sight", "The Loco-Motion", "In Your Eyes" Latin section and "Can't Get You Out of My Head".

A special webcast of the show at the Manchester Arena was shown exclusively on MSN UK live for fans around the world.

== Concert synopsis ==
Across the tour, each show was split into seven acts and an encore, with 18 songs performed (as well as an introduction and four interludes).

Silvanemesis opened the show with an introduction of "The Sound of Music". Kylie then rises out of the stage encased in a metallic outfit dubbed the "Kyborg". This peels back to reveal Kylie in a silver bra and mini-skirt with matching boots. She goes on to sing "Come into My World" and a remixed version of "Shocked". She then welcomes the audience and sings "Love at First Sight". She then introduces the title track "Fever", which closes the act.

Droogie Nights begins with an interlude of Beethoven's "Ode to Joy". This then leads into a new remix of "Spinning Around", where Kylie and the dancers are dressed to resemble characters from A Clockwork Orange.

The Crying Game begins with an interlude of "Where Is the Feeling?" before the left screen rises to reveal Minogue in a black ball gown singing Boy George's "The Crying Game". She then goes onto perform a medley of three of her own songs: "Put Yourself in My Place", "Finer Feelings" and "Dangerous Game" before returning to "The Crying Game" and closing the act.

Streetstyle begins with an interlude of "GBI: German Bold Italic". A dancer appears and imitates drawing graffiti on a screen, with Minogue then entering dressed as a police woman to sing "Confide in Me". She then goes on to sing "Cowboy Style" and finishes the act by inviting the backing vocalists to sing "Kids" with her.

Sex in Venice opens with "On a Night Like This", where she and the dancers are dressed in corsets. After this, she sings a new version of "The Locomotion" and then performs "In Your Eyes", which transitions into a Latin-style medley after the chorus, containing "Please Stay" and "Rhythm of the Night". She then finishes off the act with a reprise of "In Your Eyes".

Cybertronica is the sixth section and begins with a tap dance interlude, followed by a remixed version of "Limbo", which saw Minogue rise out of the stage. Following this, she sang a new remix of "Light Years" which featured a chorus of "I Feel Love". To close the act, she sang a new version of "I Should Be So Lucky" that contained elements of her song "Dreams".

Voodoo Inferno is the final section before the encore, beginning with a percussion interlude, before revealing Minogue rising above the stage wearing an oversized red dress singing "Burning Up", revealing 12 dancers beneath it later in the song. She then closes the main body of the show with "Better the Devil You Know".

For the one-song encore, Minogue appeared from under the catwalk in a white waistcoat and cargo pants to sing the Blue Monday mix of "Can't Get You Out of My Head".

== Setlist ==
Act 1: Silvanemesis

1. "The Sound of Music" (Introduction)
2. "Come into My World"
3. "Shocked" (contains elements of "Madskillz-Mic Chekka")
4. "Love at First Sight"
5. "Fever"

Act 2: Droogie Nights

6. "Symphony No. 9, Op. 125 (Ode to Joy)" (Video Interlude)
7. "Spinning Around" (contains elements of "September")

Act 3: The Crying Game

8. "Where Is the Feeling?" (Interlude)
9. "The Crying Game" / "Put Yourself in My Place" (contains elements of "Teardrop") / "Finer Feelings" / "Dangerous Game" / "The Crying Game" (Reprise)

Act 4: Street Style

10. "GBI: German Bold Italic" (Video Interlude)
11. "Confide in Me"
12. "Cowboy Style" (contains elements of "Double Dutch Bus", "Double Dutch" and "Buffalo Gals", with excerpts from "The Real Slim Shady")
13. "Kids"

Act 5: Sex in Venice

14. "On a Night Like This"
15. "The Locomotion"
16. "In Your Eyes" / "Please Stay" / "Rhythm of the Night" / "In Your Eyes" (Reprise)

Act 6: Cybertronica

17. "Cybertronica" (Interlude)
18. "Limbo"
19. "Light Years" / "I Feel Love"
20. "I Should Be So Lucky" (contains excerpts from "Dreams")

Act 7: Voodoo Inferno

21. "Burning Up"
22. "Better the Devil You Know"

Encore

23. "Can't Get You Out of My Head" (contains elements of "Blue Monday")

== Tour dates ==
Date (2002)	City	Country	Venue
26 April	Cardiff	United Kingdom	Cardiff International Arena
27 April	Cardiff	United Kingdom	Cardiff International Arena
28 April	Cardiff	United Kingdom	Cardiff International Arena
29 April	Cardiff	United Kingdom	Cardiff International Arena
1 May	Manchester	United Kingdom	Manchester Evening News Arena
2 May	Manchester	United Kingdom	Manchester Evening News Arena
3 May	Manchester	United Kingdom	Manchester Evening News Arena
4 May	Manchester	United Kingdom	Manchester Evening News Arena
6 May	Birmingham	United Kingdom	NEC Arena
7 May	Birmingham	United Kingdom	NEC Arena
8 May	Birmingham	United Kingdom	NEC Arena
9 May	Birmingham	United Kingdom	NEC Arena
11 May	Manchester	United Kingdom	Manchester Evening News Arena
12 May	Manchester	United Kingdom	Manchester Evening News Arena
14 May	Sheffield	United Kingdom	Sheffield Arena
15 May	Sheffield	United Kingdom	Sheffield Arena
17 May	Glasgow	United Kingdom	SECC Concert Hall 4
18 May	Glasgow	United Kingdom	SECC Concert Hall 4
19 May	Glasgow	United Kingdom	SECC Concert Hall 4
21 May	Newcastle	United Kingdom	Telewest Arena
22 May	Newcastle	United Kingdom	Telewest Arena
24 May	London	United Kingdom	Wembley Arena
25 May	London	United Kingdom	Wembley Arena
26 May	London	United Kingdom	Wembley Arena
27 May	London	United Kingdom	Wembley Arena
30 May	Stockholm	Sweden	Hovet
31 May	Oslo	Norway	Oslo Spektrum
1 June	Copenhagen	Denmark	Forum Copenhagen
3 June	Munich	Germany	Olympiahalle
4 June	Vienna	Austria	BA-CA Halle
6 June	Zürich	Switzerland	Hallenstadion
8 June	Berlin	Germany	Velodrom
9 June	Hamburg	Germany	Alsterdorfer Sporthalle
11 June	Frankfurt	Germany	Festhalle Frankfurt
12 June	Rotterdam	Netherlands	Rotterdam Ahoy Sportpaleis
13 June	Oberhausen	Germany	König Pilsener Arena
15 June	Paris	France	Palais Omnisports de Paris-Bercy
18 June	Milan	Italy	Mediolanum Forum
2 August	Sydney	Australia	Sydney Entertainment Centre
3 August	Sydney	Australia	Sydney Entertainment Centre
4 August	Sydney	Australia	Sydney Entertainment Centre
6 August	Sydney	Australia	Sydney Entertainment Centre
7 August	Sydney	Australia	Sydney Entertainment Centre
8 August	Sydney	Australia	Sydney Entertainment Centre
11 August	Melbourne	Australia	Rod Laver Arena
12 August	Melbourne	Australia	Rod Laver Arena
14 August	Melbourne	Australia	Rod Laver Arena
15 August	Melbourne	Australia	Rod Laver Arena
16 August	Melbourne	Australia	Rod Laver Arena

=== Cancelled shows ===
List of cancelled concerts, showing date, city, country, venue and reason for cancellation
Date (2002)	City	Country	Venue	Reason
20 June	Badalona	Spain	Pavello Olympic Badalona	National strike

== Personnel ==
- Kylie Minogue – executive producer
- Bill Lord – executive producer
- Terry Blamey – executive producer, management
- Andrew Small – musical director, drums
- William Baker – creative director
- Alan McDonald – creative director
- Steve Anderson – musical producer
- Sean Fitzpatrick – tour manager
- Steve Martin – tour production manager
- Vince Foster – lighting designer
- Chris Keating – concert video director
- Rafael Bonachela – choreographer
- Amy Hollingsworth – assistant choreographer
- Dolce & Gabbana – costumes
- Steve Turner – keyboards
- Chris Brown – bass
- James Hayto – guitar
- Lurine Cato – backing vocals
- Sherina White – backing vocals
- DJ Ziggy – turntables and scratching
- Terry Kvasnik – acrobat
- Pia Driver – dancer
- Patti Hines – dancer
- Milena Mancini – dancer
- Alec Mann – dancer
- Jason Piper – dancer
- Adam Pudney – dancer
- Emma Ribbing – dancer
- Alicia Herrero Simon – dancer
- Andile E Sotiya – dancer
- Melanie Teall – dancer
- Rod Buchanan – dancer

Chris Pyne - FOH audio engineer Rod Matheson - Artist & Band monitor engineer
