= Breathe (Kylie Minogue song) =

1998 single by Kylie Minogue

Single by Kylie Minogue

from the album Impossible Princess
- Released: 16 March 1998
- Studio: Mayfair (London, England)
- Genre: Electronica
- Length: 3:39 (radio edit); 4:37 (album version)
- Label: Mushroom; Deconstruction; BMG
- Songwriters: Kylie Minogue; Dave Ball; Ingo Vauk
- Producers: Dave Ball; Ingo Vauk

Kylie Minogue singles chronology
"Did It Again" (1997)	"Breathe" (1998)	"Cowboy Style" (1998)

Music video
- "Breathe" on YouTube

"Breathe" is a song by Australian singer Kylie Minogue, from her sixth studio album, Impossible Princess (1997). It was released on 16 March 1998 as the third single from the album, and her final one for the Deconstruction Records label. "Breathe" was co-written by Minogue with Ball and Vauk and produced by Dave Ball and Ingo Vauk. Backed by synthesisers and keyboards, it is an electronica track. The lyrics revolve around contemplation and calmness. "Breathe" received mostly positive reviews from music critics, some of whom highlighted the track as an album stand-out and commended the lyrical and vocal delivery.

Released in Australia, New Zealand and the United Kingdom, it peaked at number twenty-three and fourteen on the Australian Singles Chart and the UK Singles Chart, respectively. This was her last charting single in the UK until her 2000 single "Spinning Around". Kieran Evans directed the song's music video, which features Minogue floating in an open airspace with spiral effects that were generated by CGI. The video was positively received for the production and the visual effects. Minogue performed the song on Top of the Pops, and later included it on the setlist of her Intimate and Live Tour (1998), Money Can't Buy concert (2003) and Kylie Presents Golden promotional tour (2018).

== Background and composition ==
"Breathe" is about contemplation and holding back emotions. The lyrics were written by Minogue in Tokyo during her trips with her boyfriend, Stéphane Sednaoui, in late 1995. She explained the idea came to mind when her friends were worried about her being silent: "My girlfriend told me 'You don't realize how loud you are when you are quiet'." She felt that it was "typical" of her to be thinking and "deciding what was wrong" because she felt that things in her head "were not clear."

Written by Minogue, Dave Ball and Ingo Vauk, "Breathe" lasts a duration of four minutes and thirty-eight seconds in its original album version. The radio edit is not only notably shorter, at three minutes and thirty-nine seconds, it is also faster – at 105 beats per minute as opposed to the original's BPM of 90. Minogue composed the bridge section using a synthesiser and keyboards. (Note: Minogue said on An Interview with Kylie Minogue that she co-produced and co-composed "Breathe", "Say Hey" and "Too Far" but omitted her name from the liner notes' production credits in the album booklet.) Livingston Brown played the bass guitar, and Steve Sidelnyk played the drums on the track; other additional instruments were handled by Ball and Vauk. This also marks Minogue's first song along with "Too Far" that she had co-produced. "Breathe" was recorded in London, England at Ball and Vauk's home studio's while additional recording was handled at Mayfair Studios. Minogue flew to New York in late 1997 to re-record her vocals for the remix by American producer and disc jockey, Todd Terry.

"Breathe" is an electronica song that was noted for its sonic comparison with album track, "Say Hey". According to Tom Parker, who provided the special edition album notes for Impossible Princess, "['Breathe'] is a seductive electronic groove, with a hypnotic subtlety and timelessness befitting the theme inward contemplating and resolve." Larry Flick from Billboard said that "Breathe" is a "user-friendly jam" which is "largely due to its big-beat electronic groove and ear-tickling pop chorus."

== Release ==
"Breathe" was released on 16 March 1998 as the third single from Impossible Princess. It was the last commercial single for her international labels, Deconstruction and BMG. Like "Did It Again", "Breathe" appeared as a double-set of CD singles. The CD set features remixes and the album version, where the first set includes an interactive music video of "Did It Again". The artwork for the singles was shot by Sednaoui, who had photographed the album cover and photo shoot for Impossible Princess. Both CD sets feature close-up shots of Minogue's face, individually taken from different directions. The song was released as a promotional CD and cassette single in the UK and in vinyl format in Spain, Australia and the UK.

"Breathe" debuted at number 14 on the UK Singles Chart on the week end of 21 March 1998. It was the fourth highest debut single from that week, the highest being Spice Girls' single "Stop" at number 2. The song lasted four weeks in the chart. This became Minogue's twenty-eighth consecutive top forty single. "Breathe" and "Did It Again" were equally Minogue's highest charting singles from Impossible Princess. "Breathe" debuted and peaked at number twenty-three on the Australian Singles Chart on the week end of 26 April 1998. The song lasted thirteen weeks in the top fifty, one of her longest spanning singles in the chart.

== Critical reception ==
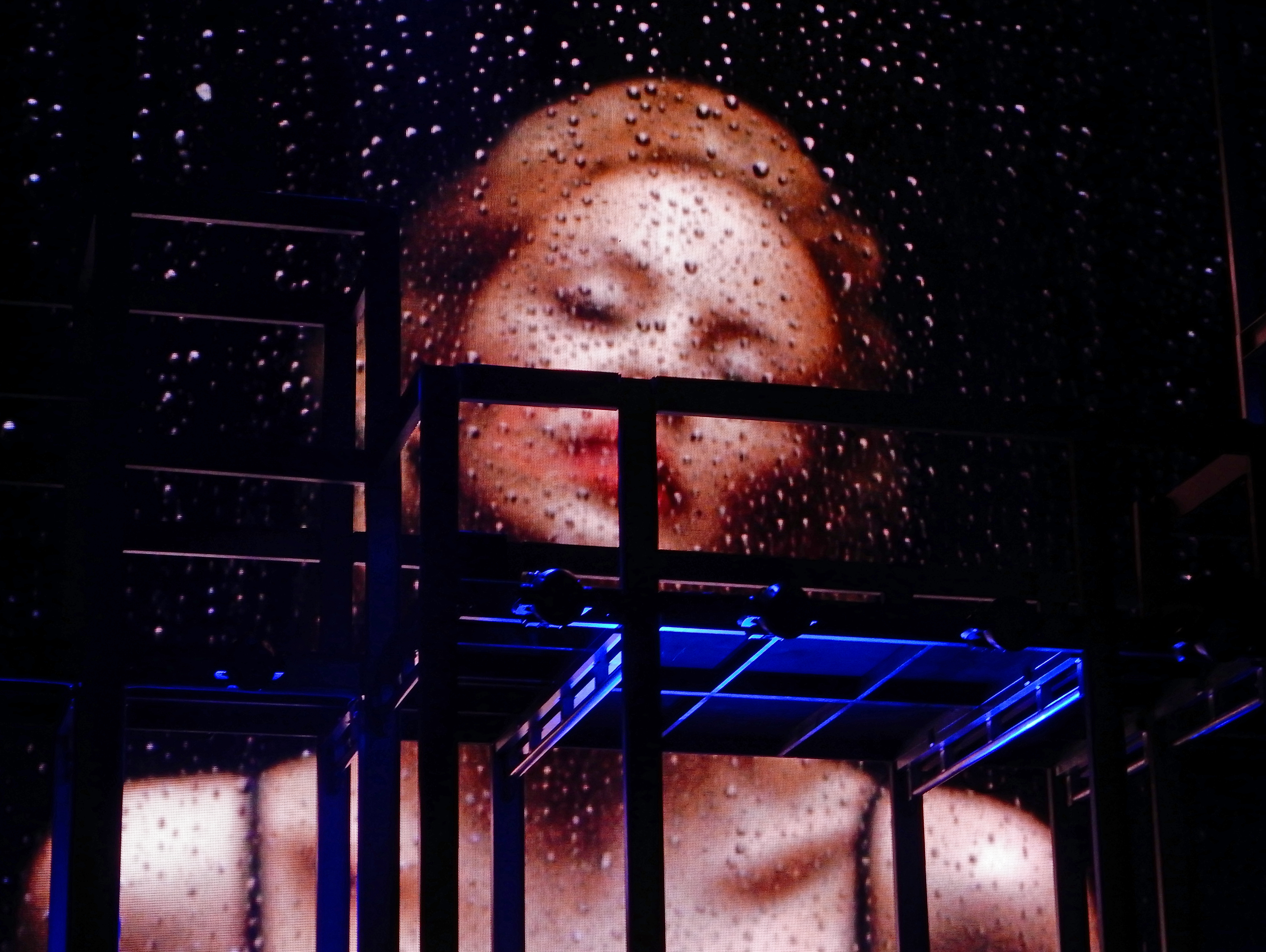
A remixed version of "Breathe" was used as an introduction for Minogue's 2014 Kiss Me Once Tour.

"Breathe" received mostly positive commentary from music critics. Michael R. Smith from Daily Vault said "Breathe" and "Did It Again" are "most notable for the videos that went along with them and are fair representations of the album at large (which should be the purpose of singles), though there are many more undiscovered gems here." Nick Levine from Digital Spy selected the song as the album's best track by writing "Truth be told, this album lacks an absolute classic to match 'Confide in Me', but 'Breathe' – subtle but sneakily catchy with it – could be one of [Minogue]'s most underrated singles." A reviewer from Music Week gave it three out of five, vieweing it as a "soothing dance track which, despite gently working its magic, is too subtle to return her to the big league." While reviewing Minogue's 2004 compilation, Ultimate Kylie, Jaime Gill from Yahoo! Music gave it a mixed review by writing "Beginning in 1994 with the gorgeously glacial, slinkily synthetic 'Confide In Me', Kylie enjoyed brief success before fans fled in droves from awkward faux-rock like 'Some Kind of Bliss' (not included) and flimsy house like 'Breathe'." Reviewing her 2002 compilation, Hits+, Mackenzie Wilson from AllMusic commended Minogue's "seductive vocals" on "Breathe", "Automatic Love" and "Confide in Me".

Chris True, also from AllMusic, selected the song as a standout track on her Greatest Hits 87-97 album. Jason Lipshutz from Billboard listed "Breathe" at four on their "Kylie Minogue Primer: The Top 10 Past Hits You Need to Know" stating "'Breathe' is the obvious stand out, sounding almost like a Nine Inch Nails throwaway in its opening seconds and morphing into a silky, sexy defence of Minogue's experimental side." Louis Virtel from The Backlot listed "Breathe" at number 14 on their "Kylie Minogue's 50 Best Songs, in Honor of Her Birthday" and said "'Breathe' would be a meditative masterpiece if it weren't so confrontational, deadpan, and sexually domineering. Impossible Princess unassuming heart stopper trips into unexpected carnality in its choruses, assuring you 'It won't be long now' as you try to time your hyperventilation."

== Promotion ==
=== Music video ===
An accompanying music video was directed by Welsh film director Kieran Evans. "Breathe" was Evan's directional debut and he went on to work for Heavenly Films, a sister project of British record label Heavenly Recordings. It opens with close-up shots of Minogue's body parts. Throughout the video, a giant glass orb is seen on the screen and a mysterious light is shown. From there onwards, it shows Minogue in an airspace of spiral effects, all produced by green screen and CGI effects. In the second verse, it has three shots of Minogue layering over top, with one of the scenes having her singing the track. The video then finishes with Minogue floating away, being an in-set of her own eye, which was seen at the start of the video. For the radio/video version, the song is sped up at a faster tempo.

One of the shots of the video was used as the album cover for her 2002 greatest hits compilation, Confide in Me. The music video is featured on other of Minogue's releases including The Kylie Tapes 94–98, Greatest Hits 1987–1999, Kylie Minogue: Artist Collection and her 2004 DVD, Ultimate Kylie.

=== Live performances ===
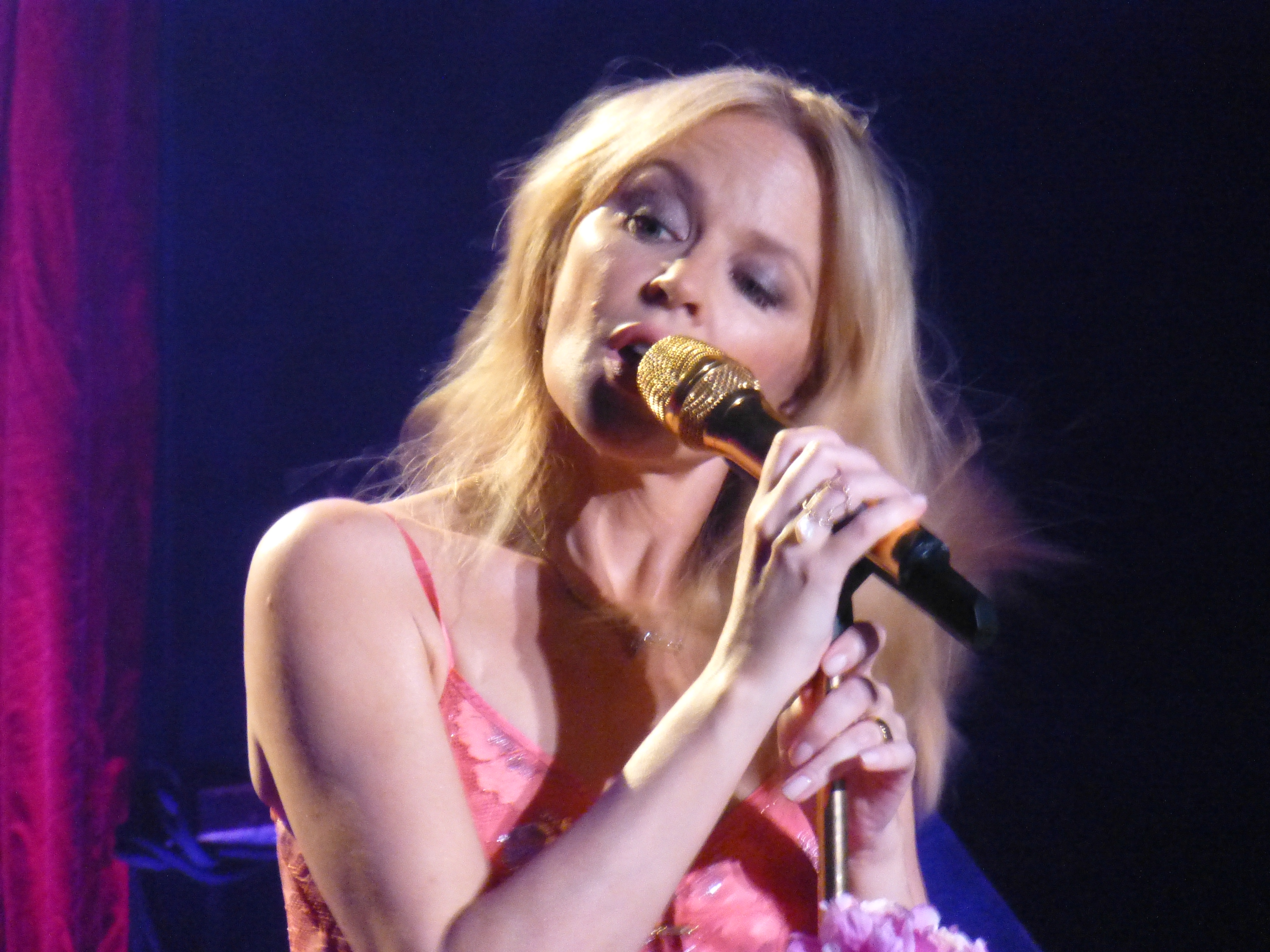
Minogue performing "Breathe" at New York City's Bowery Ballroom on 25 June 2018, as part of her Kylie Presents Golden promotional tour

Minogue performed "Breathe" in April 1998 on The Ben Elton Show, and on the Australian evening TV series, Hey Hey It's Saturday. The song was included on several live shows including the Top of the Pops, and The National Lottery Live. She appeared as a lead guest and performed the song in an episode of the Live & Kicking music show, which attracted 38 percent in rating, double the audience of any show that week. "Breathe" was included on the Intimate and Live Tour, it was part of second segment for which Minogue wore a black, long-collared shirt and three-quarter pants. The performance was recorded on 30 June and 1 July at Capitol Theatre in Sydney, and appeared on the related CD and DVD.

"Breathe" was performed by Minogue on Money Can't Buy, a one-off concert show held on 15 November 2003 at Hammersmith Apollo, London, to promote her ninth studio album Body Language. The "Bardello" act of the concert commenced with a mashup of "Breathe" and "Je t'aime... moi non plus", a 1969 French duet between Serge Gainsbourg and Jane Birkin. Craig McLean from The Daily Telegraph described the backup dancers during this segment as "Tour de France cyclists moonlighting as Moulin Rouge hostesses." The performance was later added to Minogue's Body Language Live DVD from the concert. In 2012, the orchestral version of the song didn't make the track list of The Abbey Road Sessions but was uploaded on Minogue's official YouTube account. In 2014 and 2015, Minogue sampled the song as an introduction for her Kiss Me Once and 2015 summer Tour, respectively. An acoustic version of "Breathe" was included on the singer's 2018 Kylie Presents Golden promotional tour; writing for the Manchester Evening News, Katie Fitzpatrick praised the performance for being "beautifully stripped back [...] with some fabulously confident backing vocals coming from the smitten crowd".

== Track listings ==
Australian and UK CD1

1. "Breathe" (radio edit) – 3:39
2. "Breathe" (Tee's Freeze Mix) – 6:59
3. "Breathe" (Nalin & Kane Remix) – 10:11
4. "Breathe" (album mix) – 4:38

Australian and UK CD2

1. "Breathe" (radio edit) – 3:39
2. "Breathe" (Sash! club mix) – 5:20
3. "Breathe" (Tee's radio edit) – 3:29
4. "Did It Again" (video) – 4:15

European CD single and UK cassette single

1. "Breathe" (radio edit) – 3:39
2. "Breathe" (Sash! club mix edit) – 3:43

European maxi-CD single

1. "Breathe" (radio edit) – 3:39
2. "Breathe" (Tee's radio edit) – 3:39
3. "Breathe" (Tee's Freeze Mix) – 6:59
4. "Breathe" (Sash! club mix) – 5:20
5. "Breathe" (Nalin & Kane Remix) – 10:11

== Personnel ==
Personnel are adapted from both maxi-single liner notes.

=== Song credits ===
- Kylie Minogue – vocals, songwriting, synthesiser, keyboards
- Dave Ball – songwriting, production, other instruments
- Ingo Vauk – songwriting, production, other instruments
- Livingstone Brown – bass guitar
- Steve Sidelnyk – drums, percussion
- Richard Lowe – engineering, mixing
- Sunny Lizic – engineering, mixing

=== Cover credits ===
- Kylie Minogue – model
- Stephane Sednaoui – photography, design
- Farrow Design – cover sleeve programming

== Charts ==
Weekly chart performance for "Breathe"
Chart (1998)	Peak position
Australia (ARIA)	23
Europe (Eurochart Hot 100)	70
Scottish Singles Sales (Official Charts)	14
UK Singles (Official Charts)	14
