= Confide in Me (disambiguation) =

"Confide in Me" is a dance–pop song by Kylie Minogue.

Confide in Me may also refer to:

- Confide in Me (2001 album), a 2001 Kylie Minogue compilation album
- Confide in Me: The Irresistible Kylie, a 2007 compilation album
- Confide in Me (2016 album), a 2016 Kylie Minogue compilation album
- "Confide in Me", a song by Diana Ross from Baby It's Me
- "Confide in Me", a song by Donald Fagen, recorded at the time of his 1993 album Kamakiriad, covered by The Manhattan Transfer on their album The Offbeat of Avenues
