= KylieFever2002 (album) =

2002 album by Kylie Minogue

Live album by Kylie Minogue
- Released: 18 November 2002
- Genre: Pop, rock
- Length: 73:51
- Label: Parlophone; Festival Mushroom

Kylie Minogue chronology
Confide in Me (2002)	KylieFever2002 (2002)	Greatest Hits (2002)

KylieFever2002 is a live album by Australian singer-songwriter Kylie Minogue. It was released in the limited edition DVD version of the tour. It had all of the tour on apart from the 'Cybertronica' act, "GBI" and "Burning Up".

== Track listing ==
No.	Title	Length
1.	"Come into My World"	6:20
2.	"Shocked"	5:34
3.	"Love at First Sight"	4:24
4.	"Fever"	3:39
5.	"Spinning Around"	4:06
6.	"The Crying Game" (Ballads Section - "The Crying Game" / "Put Yourself in My Place" / "Finer Feelings" / "Dangerous Game" / "The Crying Game" (Reprise))	9:05
7.	"Confide in Me"	6:19
8.	"Cowboy Style"	6:08
9.	"Kids"	4:18
10.	"On a Night Like This"	3:58
11.	"The Locomotion"	3:51
12.	"In Your Eyes" (Latin Section - "In Your Eyes" / "Please Stay" / "Rhythm of the Night" / "In Your Eyes" (Reprise))	5:23
13.	"Better the Devil You Know"	5:49
14.	"Can't Get You Out of My Head" (Blue Monday version)	4:57
Total length:		73:51
