= Showgirl: Homecoming Live =

2007 album by Kylie Minogue

Live album by Kylie Minogue
- Released: 8 January 2007
- Recorded: 12 November 2006
- Venues: Sydney Entertainment Centre (Sydney, Australia)
- Length: 116:09
- Labels: Parlophone; EMI
- Producer: Steve Anderson

Kylie Minogue chronology
Showgirl (2005)	Showgirl: Homecoming Live (2007)	Darling (2007)

Showgirl: Homecoming Live is the fourth live album by Australian singer-songwriter Kylie Minogue. It was first released on 8 January 2007 as a double CD set, by Parlophone in the United Kingdom, before an international release took place in the following months. Produced by Steve Anderson, the album was recorded on 12 November 2006, during one of Minogue's concerts of her Showgirl: Homecoming Tour in Sydney, Australia at the Sydney Entertainment Centre. The concert features U2's vocalist Bono as a featured artist on the song "Kids".

Showgirl: Homecoming Live received mixed reviews from music critics, who were ambivalent over its content as well its overlong length, and thought the concert would be more appreciated visually rather than in audio. Commercially, the release attained moderate success worldwide; it reached number seven in the United Kingdom and was later certified silver by the British Phonographic Industry (BPI) for shipments of over 60,000 copies. The album also charted within the top 30 in Australia, Croatia and Scotland.

== Background ==
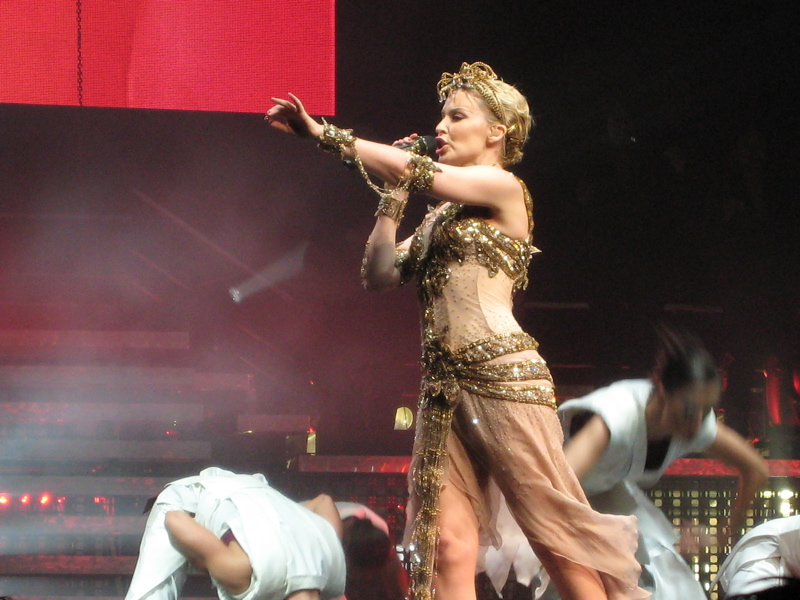
The Samsara section of the show was deemed as one of the best moments of the album by newspaper The Observer.

Showgirl: Homecoming Tour was the ninth concert tour by Australian singer Kylie Minogue. It supported her second major greatest hits compilation, Ultimate Kylie (2004), and visited Australia and the United Kingdom. Minogue was originally scheduled to perform in Australia and Asia during her Showgirl: The Greatest Hits Tour in 2005, but the dates were postponed due to her breast cancer diagnosis. In a statement, the singer said she was "looking forward to bringing the Showgirl tour to Australian audiences and am sorry to have to disappoint my fans"; her Australian tour manager, Michael Gudinski, would later declare the tour dates would be postponed until the end of 2006, when Minogue could be fully recovered. The tour was officially announced on 22 June 2006 by Frontier Touring Company, initially comprising only dates in Australia, but due to popular demand, shows in the United Kingdom were also announced.

The tour contained a revised set list and new costumes. To accommodate Minogue's medical condition and conserve her strength, both alterations to the choreography and longer breaks between show sections were introduced. It received positive reviews, with critics deeming the concert an "extravaganza", and a "perfect comeback". The tour was also a commercial success, selling 215,000 tickets for twenty concerts in Australia, becoming the best selling tour by a female artist in the country. The album was recorded on 12 November 2006, during Minogue's second concert at the Sydney Entertainment Centre in Sydney; the concert featured U2's Bono on the song "Kids". The record was first released on 8 January 2007 in the United Kingdom, coinciding with Minogue's tour in the region. It was later issued internationally in countries such as Australia and Japan.

== Critical reception ==
Professional ratings
Review scores
Source	Rating
The Advertiser	4/5 stars
AllMusic	3/5 stars
Daily Record	5/5 stars
The Daily Telegraph	4/5 stars
Gaffa	2/6 stars
The Gazette	3/5 stars
MusicOMH	3/5 stars
This is Local London	4/5 stars
The Times	2/5 stars
The Winnipeg Sun	2.5/5 stars

Showgirl: Homecoming Live received mixed reviews from music critics. Lizzie Ennever of BBC Music gave the album a positive review, writing that "if you're a true Kylie fan, this is an essential addition to your collection; if you're not, you might just find yourself becoming one". For The Daily Telegraph's Cameron Adams, the record "lets you focus without [visual] distraction on the songs that made it all happen", and viewed Minogue's performance with Bono on "Kids" as its "money shot". Michael Hubbard from musicOMH stated that it "makes the listener wish they'd been at the concert", but pointed out that "missing the show's visual elements feels like only getting half of the story". Echoing a similar opinion, Chris Toh from Torque said that the main exercise of the album was "one of imagination", since most of Minogue's concerts are a dramatic spectacle. For the staff of MSN Music, "without the lavish visuals, dance routines and fireworks Kylie does have a habit of sounding a little flat and out-of-breath at times" in the album, but declared that "whether she's in tune or not, it's still great to have her back!".

T'Cha Dunlevy from The Gazette said the album "lacks the visual impact of the original Showgirl tour DVD", but considered it "fun for fans". Giving the release two-and-a-half out of five stars, Darryl Sterdan of The Winnipeg Sun wrote that it "does deliver the best of both worlds", complimenting the live renditions of "Come into My World" and "Slow", but felt "the world needs live CDs from Kylie the same way it needs radio shows about actual Showgirls". The Observer's Emily Stokes called it a "never-ending" record which has "rougher patches than her Greatest Hits", but showed "Kylie at her most girlishly versatile", citing the Samsara section and the new version of "The Locomotion" as examples. In a similar vein, Steve Jelbert from The Times also criticized the album's length, calling it "overlong" and commented the record suffers "the usual pitfalls of live albums", making it sound like "a tape of a wedding reception disco". Also in a more negative review, Sharon Mawer from AllMusic stated that "Minogue will continue to have hit singles and albums because the public loves her whatever she does, but this album did nothing to enhance her reputation or add to her impressive catalog."

== Commercial performance ==
In the United Kingdom, Showgirl: Homecoming Live opened at number seven on the UK Albums Chart. It spent five weeks on the chart and was later certified silver by the British Phonographic Industry (BPI) for shipments of over 60,000 copies. It was less successful in Scotland, peaking at number 14. The album also charted moderately in other European countries; in Austria, it reached number 55, charting for only one week. Showgirl: Homecoming Live attained more success in Croatia, where it peaked at number 25 on the national charts, as well as number six on the chart counting only international artists. In Australia, the release debuted at number 28 on the ARIA Charts, on the issue dated 18 February 2007, and dropped out of the chart at number 43 the following week.

== Track listing ==
Disc one
No.	Title	Length
1.	"Overture – The Showgirl Theme"	2:44
2.	"Better the Devil You Know"	3:46
3.	"In Your Eyes"	3:06
4.	"White Diamond"	3:33
5.	"On a Night Like This"	4:30
6.	"Everything Taboo Medley" (Shocked / What Do I Have to Do? / Spinning Around)	8:22
7.	"Temple Prequel"	2:57
8.	"Confide in Me"	4:26
9.	"Cowboy Style"	3:29
10.	"Finer Feelings"	1:25
11.	"Too Far"	4:33
12.	"Red Blooded Woman / Where the Wild Roses Grow"	4:34
13.	"Slow"	4:39
14.	"Kids" (featuring Bono)	6:05

Disc two
No.	Title	Length
1.	"Rainbow Prequel"	1:10
2.	"Somewhere Over the Rainbow"	2:43
3.	"Come into My World"	3:05
4.	"Chocolate"	2:45
5.	"I Believe in You"	3:28
6.	"Dreams / When You Wish Upon a Star"	3:56
7.	"Burning Up / Vogue"	3:21
8.	"The Locomotion"	4:43
9.	"I Should Be So Lucky / The Only Way Is Up"	3:26
10.	"Hand on Your Heart"	4:19
11.	"Space Prequel"	1:54
12.	"Can't Get You Out of My Head"	3:55
13.	"Light Years / Turn It into Love"	8:13
14.	"Especially for You"	4:28
15.	"Love at First Sight"	6:35

== Personnel ==
Credits adapted from the liner notes of Showgirl: Homecoming Live.

- William Baker – director, backstage photography
- Steve Anderson – executive producer, music director, programming, orchestrations, producer, show arranger
- Andrew Small – co-producer, drums, music director
- Chris Brown – bass
- Steve Turner – keyboards
- Mark Jaimes – guitar
- Hazer Fernandez – backing vocals
- Janet Ramus – backing vocals
- Valerie Etienne – backing vocals
- Tim Weidner – mixing
- Geoff Pesche – mastering
- Chris Pyne – recording
- Ken Mckay – photography
- Richard Ash – light retractions, trails
- Tony Hung – light retractions, trails
- Adjective Noun – sleeve direction, design

== Charts ==
Chart performance for Showgirl: Homecoming Live
Chart (2007)	Peak position
Australian Albums (ARIA)	28
Austrian Albums (Ö3 Austria)	55
Belgian Albums (Ultratop Flanders)	92
Croatian Albums (HDU)	25
Croatian International Albums (HDU)	6
French Albums (SNEP)	113
German Albums (Offizielle Top 100)	59
Scottish Albums (Official Charts)	14
Swiss Albums (Schweizer Hitparade)	54
UK Albums (Official Charts)	7

== Certifications ==
Certifications for Showgirl: Homecoming Live
Region	Certification	Certified units/sales
United Kingdom (BPI)	Silver	60,000^{^}
^{^} Shipments figures based on certification alone.

== Release history ==
Release dates and formats for Showgirl: Homecoming Live
Region	Date	Format(s)	Label	Ref.
United Kingdom	8 January 2007	CD; digital download	Parlophone	
Italy	12 January 2007	CD; digital download	EMI	
Australia	3 February 2007	CD; digital download	Warner Music Australia	
Germany	8 February 2007	CD; digital download	EMI Music Germany	
Japan	27 June 2007	CD; digital download	EMI Music Japan	
