= Confide in Me: The Irresistible Kylie =

2007 album by Kylie Minogue

Compilation album by Kylie Minogue
- Released: 16 July 2007
- Recorded: 1993–1997
- Genres: Pop; trip hop; dance; R&B; electronica
- Label: Music Club

Kylie Minogue chronology
Darling (2007)	Confide in Me: The Irresistible Kylie (2007)	X (2007)

Confide in Me: The Irresistible Kylie is a compilation album by Australian singer Kylie Minogue. It was released by Music Club on 16 July 2007 in the United Kingdom. The album contains every song from Minogue's two Deconstruction Records albums Kylie Minogue (1994) and Impossible Princess (1997), as well as rare songs and B-sides.

== Track listing ==
Disc one
No.	Title	Writer(s)	Producer(s)	Length
1.	"Confide in Me" (from Kylie Minogue, 1994)	Steve Anderson; Dave Seaman; Owain Barton	Brothers in Rhythm	5:51
2.	"Put Yourself in My Place" (from Kylie Minogue, 1994)	Jimmy Harry	Harry	4:12
3.	"Where Is the Feeling?" (BIR 7" Mix, from Kylie Minogue, 1994)	Wilf Smarties; Jayne Hanna	Brothers in Rhythm	4:11
4.	"If I Was Your Lover" (from Kylie Minogue, 1994)	Harry	Harry	4:45
5.	"Some Kind of Bliss" (from Impossible Princess, 1997)	Minogue; James Dean Bradfield; Sean Moore	Dave Eringa; Bradfield	4:12
6.	"Did It Again" (from Impossible Princess, 1997)	Minogue; Anderson; Seaman	Brothers in Rhythm	4:22
7.	"Breathe" (single version; from Impossible Princess, 1997)	Minogue; Dave Ball; Ingo Vauk	Ball; Vauk	3:40
8.	"If You Don't Love Me" (from Hits+, 2000)			2:12
9.	"Tears" (from Impossible Princess (Japan bonus track), 1998)	Minogue; Ball; Vauk	Ball; Vauk	4:29
10.	"Gotta Move On" (from Hits+, 2000)			3:35
11.	"Difficult by Design" (from Hits+, 2000)			3:43
12.	"Stay This Way" (from Hits+, 2000)			4:34
13.	"This Girl" (from Hits+, 2000)			3:08
14.	"Automatic Love" (from Kylie Minogue, 1994)	Minogue; Inga Humpe; Charlie Mallozzi; Marco Sabiu	Brothers in Rhythm	4:45
15.	"Where Has the Love Gone?" (Roach Motel Mix, from Kylie Minogue, 1994)	Alex Palmer; Julie Stapleton		9:25
16.	"Surrender" (from Kylie Minogue, 1994)	Gerry DeVeaux; Charlie Mole	DeVeaux; John Waddle; Tim Bran	4:25
17.	"Dangerous Game" (from Kylie Minogue, 1994)	Anderson; Seaman	Brothers in Rhythm	5:30

Disc two
No.	Title	Writer(s)	Producer(s)	Length
1.	"Time Will Pass You By" (from Kylie Minogue, 1994)	Dino Fekaris; Nick Zesses; John Rhys	M People	5:26
2.	"Falling" (from Kylie Minogue, 1994)	Neil Tennant; Chris Lowe	Pete Heller; Terry Farley	6:43
3.	"Nothing Can Stop Us" (from Kylie Minogue, 1994)	Mike Percy; Tim Lever; Tracy Ackerman	Brothers in Rhythm	4:06
4.	"Love is Waiting" (from Kylie Minogue, 1994)	Bob Stanley; Pete Wiggs	Saint Etienne	4:48
5.	"Cowboy Style" (from Impossible Princess, 1997)	Minogue; Anderson; Seaman	Brothers in Rhythm	4:44
6.	"Say Hey" (from Impossible Princess, 1997)	Minogue	Brothers in Rhythm	3:37
7.	"Drunk" (from Impossible Princess, 1997)	Minogue; Anderson; Seaman	Brothers in Rhythm	3:59
8.	"I Don't Need Anyone" (from Impossible Princess, 1997)	Minogue; Bradfield; Nick Jones	Eringa; Bradfield	3:14
9.	"Jump" (from Impossible Princess, 1997)	Minogue, Rob Dougan	Dougan	4:04
10.	"Limbo" (from Impossible Princess, 1997)	Minogue, Ball, Vauk	Ball, Vauk	4:05
11.	"Through the Years" (from Impossible Princess, 1997)	Minogue, Ball, Vauk	Ball, Vauk	4:20
12.	"Dreams" (from Impossible Princess, 1997)	Minogue; Anderson; Seaman	Brothers in Rhythm	3:44
13.	"Too Far" (from Impossible Princess, 1997)	Minogue	Brothers in Rhythm	4:43
14.	"Confide in Me" (Brothers in Rhythm mix)	Anderson; Seaman; Barton		10:28
15.	"If You Don't Love Me" (acoustic version)			2:10
16.	"Falling" (alternate mix)	Tennant; Lowe		8:40
