= Did It Again (Kylie Minogue song) =

1997 single by Kylie Minogue

Single by Kylie Minogue

from the album Impossible Princess
- B-side: "Tears"
- Released: 24 November 1997
- Studio: Real World (Box, England)
- Genre: Pop rock; progressive rock
- Length: 4:22
- Label: Mushroom; Deconstruction; BMG
- Songwriters: Kylie Minogue; Steve Anderson; Dave Seaman
- Producer: Brothers in Rhythm

Kylie Minogue singles chronology
"GBI (German Bold Italic)" (1997)	"Did It Again" (1997)	"Breathe" (1998)

Music video
- "Did It Again" on YouTube

"Did It Again" is a song by Australian recording artist Kylie Minogue, originally featured on her sixth studio album Impossible Princess (1997). The song was released as the album's second single on 24 November 1997 through Mushroom, Deconstruction, and BMG. Minogue had written the track with Steve Anderson and Dave Seaman, and it was produced by Minogue in collaboration with Brothers in Rhythm. Backed by guitars and drum, "Did It Again" is a pop rock track in which Minogue sings about her self-consciousness and self-hatred.

Critical response to "Did It Again" was mostly positive; some critics praised the song's composition and highlighted it as a career stand out track. In Australia, "Did It Again" peaked at number 15 on the Australian Singles Chart and was certified gold by the Australian Recording Industry Association (ARIA). In the United Kingdom, it peaked at 14 on the UK Singles Chart. Pedro Romhanyi directed the song's music video, which features Minogue battling it out as four separate personas designated by the media, namely Cute Kylie, Dance Kylie, Sex Kylie and Indie Kylie.

To promote "Did It Again", Minogue performed the track on The National Lottery Live and MTV UK. It was later included on her 1998 concert tour Intimate and Live Tour. The song was subsequently included on Minogue's compilation albums Ultimate Kylie (2004) and Step Back in Time: The Definitive Collection (2019).

== Background ==
In 1997, the British media reported that she was anorexic, labelling her "Kylie Thinogue". Minogue had been told about the rumours and, as a response, wrote the track "Did It Again". Interviewed by Company magazine that year, she was questioned on her weight and the song, and she explained "It's a bit of a girl's song, with me telling myself off and never learning my lesson, particularly with men. It's me looking myself in the eye and saying 'You fool, stop being too clever and over-neurotic.' She had begun writing the song whilst British tabloids published rumors about her private life, and the poor reception that Impossible Princess' lead single "Some Kind of Bliss" received. However, she re-wrote the original lyrics with Anderson and Seaman and Minogue said it told a "different meaning". The song discusses telling herself off when she does not learn from her past mistakes. She commented that "Some of the songs from Impossible Princess are close to the heart, but this song was a little voice on my shoulder." The song was originally titled "Clever Girl (Did It Again)".

== Composition ==
"Did It Again"
The song contains an aggressive vocal style, with alternative and Eastern musical influences.

"Did It Again" was recorded at Real World, Sarm West and DMC Studios in England, and was mixed by Alan Bremnar at Real World. Greg Bone and Anderson played the guitars, while Anderson played the drums and keyboards. Produced by Brothers in Rhythm and Minogue, "Did It Again" is a pop rock song. Michael Dwyer from Western Australia magazine commented on Minogue's departure from dance music and bubblegum pop and her maturity since her work with Stock, Aitken and Waterman, stating "Some Kind of Bliss and Did It Again have already proved our Kylie has more tricks up her sleeve this time than Stock, Aitken and Waterman ever dreamed of and her sixth album harbours more strings to her carefully-cultivated bow." British writer Sean Smith, author of Kylie (2014), commented that "Did It Again" was another track, along with "I Don't Need Anyone", from Impossible Princess that "didn't really sound like Kylie". He further commented that "Did It Again" was "a blend of drums and electric guitar that might have found its way onto The Beatles' famous Revolver album." Reviewing her compilation album Greatest Hits 87–97 (2003), Michael Paoletta from Billboard magazine viewed the composition as progressive rock. The single version edits the intro of the song and is slightly faster in tempo.

== Critical reception ==
"Did It Again" received positive reviews from most music critics. Allmusic's Chris True, who also reviewed the parent album, highlighted it as a stand out track from her career. MacKenzie Wilson from Allmusic also selected "Did It Again" as a stand out from her compilation Hits+. Jack Foley from Indielondon.co.uk called "Did it Again" one of Minogue's "chart-busters" that "continue to fill the dancefloors despite being relentlessly over-played in their heyday." While reviewing one of her concerts in Australia, Darrin Farrant from The Age said, "Best of the Impossible Princess bunch was clearly Did It Again, Minogue smiling and strutting, the crowd joining her to sing every word." Gary James from Entertainment Focus praised all her co-written and self-penned tracks. Avoledo from BlogCritics.org described the song as blunt, but said it is a "cunning and self-aware look at celebrity without even mentioning fame." Guillermo Alonso, from the Spanish edition of Vanity Fair, compared Minogue's vocals to those of Shirley Manson and named "Did It Again" her 39th best single.

A reviewer from Music Week magazine awarded "Did It Again" three stars out of five, stating that Minogue's vocals "takes a stroppy edge", but "it's not strong enough to do much better than the modest performance of Some Kind of Bliss." Natasha Tripney from musicOMH said: "'Did It Again' reminds you of her valiant but wildly misjudged attempt to morph into Indie Kylie circa 1997, only really serving to highlight the limitations of her voice in the process." Michael R. Smith from Daily Vault felt the song represented the album "perfectly" and had labelled the songs as "undiscovered gems". Smith felt the song was "another underrated song" from the Impossible Princess album and labelled it an "indie classic". In the annual 1997 Triple J Hottest 100 list, "Did It Again" was 81. At the 1998 ARIA Music Awards, "Did It Again" was nominated for Single of the Year but lost to Natalie Imbruglia's single "Torn," respectively.

== Commercial performance ==
"Did It Again" entered at number 21 on the Australian Singles Chart. The song peaked at 15, her highest charting and first top 20 single from Impossible Princess. The song lasted 17 weeks in the top 50, one of her longest spanning singles in the chart. The song was certified gold by the Australian Recording Industry Association (ARIA) with shipments of 35,000 units. In the United Kingdom, "Did It Again" entered and peaked at 14 on the UK Singles Chart. It stayed in the top 100 for eight weeks and became highest charting single from the album alongside "Breathe".

== Music video ==
=== Background and development ===
An accompanying music video was directed by Pedro Romhanyi in London, England. It was filmed over a two-day period and was required to shoot each character individually. Minogue and long-term collaborator and friend, William Baker, designed the clothing for each character: Sex Kylie, Cute Kylie, Indie Kylie, and Dance Kylie. Each character represented a different appearance and persona; Baker labelled Sex Kylie as a "drag queen" with a "bitchy" attitude and "slutty" appearance. Dance Kylie had, according to Baker, an "irritating frothiness", while Cute Kylie had violet-coloured hot pants and a bra. The original costume was blue, but quickly changed due to blue screen issues. The outfit for Indie Kylie, which was red three-quarter pants with a high-collar shirt, was inspired by Star Trek films that was assisted by British fashion design, Pellicano.

Frances Whiting from Sunday Mail discussed the music video with Minogue, where she mentioned that the video was a "fun" way to portray her media images throughout her career. Regarding her "Indie Kylie" phase, Minogue commented "I don't mind being labelled Indie Kylie, I've had so many labels, but labels are a bit silly because I'm so many things, we all are." The concept for the video was created by Romanhi after discovering several articles and magazines in the 1980s and early-mid 1990s of Minogue, along with his influence of the American film Usual Suspects, but Minogue was sceptical on the final result. In an interview with MTV Australia, Minogue revealed the video was based on her life as a celebrity, stating;

Basically we were having a laugh at a lot of the different articles that were appearing at that time in different magazines and papers, and they were talking about 'Pop Kylie, Dance Kylie, Sex Kylie' and, you know, with every different release of a single they'd say 'What Kylie is it now?' and it was just becoming a joke. So he, Pedro, cunningly picked up on that and said we should make a video with all the different Kylies, which I was more then [sic] happy about, because it was stating the obvious and having a laugh at the same time.

=== Synopsis and reception ===
Indie Kylie, Dance Kylie, Sex Kylie and Cute Kylie in the video

The characters were Sex Kylie, Cute Kylie, Indie Kylie and Dance Kylie, characters which had contributed to Minogue's image throughout her career. Minogue commented that it took "longer than expected" because Romanhi wanted the outcome to be "precise". Although Minogue said that "Indie Kylie" was the winner of fight, she felt "Cute Kylie" represented herself more than the other three characters. The video opens with Sex Kylie singing and Cute Kylie pushes her. Indie Kylie appears and Dance Kylie bumps her out of the way. Throughout the video, all four characters fight and cuss towards each other. The end finishes with Cute Kylie holding a baseball bat, declaring that she was the winner of all four of them. Despite the ending and Minogue commenting that Cute Kylie amused her the most in the video, Minogue said that Indie Kylie was the winner.

The video received positive reviews, and won the Australian Video entry at the 1998 MTV Video Music Awards. Erika Brooks Adickman from Idolator said that "the tongue-in-cheek video had the pop icon acknowledging all the ways she had reinvented herself over the years". American website BuzzFeed hosted a poll for online viewers to vote their best Kylie in the "Did It Again" video. As a result, Indie Kylie won with 36% (2,926 votes), Cute Kylie came second with 26% (2,083 votes), Dance Kylie came third with 20% (1,628 votes), and Sex Kylie came fourth with 18% (1,510 votes). During an interview Minogue gave to Jetstar Airways magazine, journalist Simon Price stated that the four different Kylies were "brilliantly" satirised in the video.

Costumes from the video, along with accessories spanning Minogue's career, became part of an exhibition at the National Portrait Gallery in Australia, during May 2005. They were also displayed in another exhibition with the same theme in February 2007. A still with the four Kylies, standing together, was drawn by Jill Lamarina and added into the comic book Female Force: Kylie Minogue, published by Bluewater Comics. Media theorist Lee Barron, author of Social Theory in Popular Culture, discussed the Impossible Princess period and further stated "The Impossible Princess phase represented a period of diminished commercial success, marking the moment in which Minogue consciously began to engage in a playful awareness of image construction and referentiality ... This was unmistakably manifest in the promotional video 'Did it Again', which featured four Kylies, each defined by the labels that the media created for her". Barron felt neither of the characters in the video won, but rather "the construction of an entirely new one" and concluded "Because, although Minogue was now reflexively alluding to her identity-shredded progression, 'Indie Kylie' did not gel with the wider recording-buying public, and consequently 'Indie Kylie' was discarded for 'Camp Kylie'"; Camp Kylie was a media label for her efforts around Light Years' release.

== Live performances and other usage ==
Minogue performed "Did It Again" on The National Lottery Live, and performed the song alongside "Some Kind of Bliss" and "I Don't Need Anyone" on her performance with MTV on 4 October 1997. After the single charted in the UK, she performed it on Top of the Pops on 5 December 1997, where she wore the 'IndieKylie' outfit from the video whilst three drag queens represented the other three personas from the video. Minogue included the song on the set list for her 1998 concert tour Intimate and Live. The performance was recorded on 30 June and 1 July at Capitol Theatre in Sydney, and appeared on the related CD and DVD. It was performed at selected shows on her 2001 On a Night Like This tour and 2025 Tension Tour.

"Did It Again" has been featured on many of Minogue's compilation albums. Its first appearance was on her 2000 Deconstruction compilation Hits+ and on her 2001 BMG greatest hits compilation album Confide in Me, a compilation of the majority of her singles and tracks from her Deconstruction period; Heather Phares from Allmusic praised the Impossible Princess tracks including "Did It Again". It then appeared on her 2004 compilation albums Artist Collection and, which included most of her Impossible Princess era, Ultimate Kylie through Parlophone and on the first disc of Confide in Me: The Irresistible Kylie released in July 2007 by UK independent label Music Club. The song's last appearance was on the third disc of Step Back in Time: The Definitive Collection released in November 2019 by BMG. The Trouser Enthusiasts' Goddess of Contortion remix and Razor n Go remix appeared on her 1998 remix compilations Mixes and Impossible Remixes.

"Did It Again" features in the final scene and end credits of Australian cult dark comedy thriller Slant starring Sigrid Thornton and Pia Miranda.

== Formats and track listings ==
Australian and UK cassette single; European 2-track CD single

1. "Did It Again" (single version) – 4:14
2. "Tears" – 4:27

Australian and UK CD maxi-single 1; European and Japanese CD maxi-single

1. "Did It Again" (single version) – 4:14
2. "Tears" – 4:27
3. "Did It Again" (Did It Four Times mix) – 5:49
4. "Some Kind of Bliss" (video)

Australian and UK CD maxi-single 2

1. "Did It Again" (single version) – 4:14
2. "Did It Again" (Trouser Enthusiasts' Goddess of Contortion mix) – 10:24
3. "Did It Again" (Razor-n-Go mix) – 11:24

Australian VHS single

1. "Did It Again" (video)
2. "Some Kind of Bliss" (video)

== Personnel ==
Personnel are adapted from both maxi-single liner notes.

- Kylie Minogue – vocals, songwriting, vocal production
- Steve Anderson – songwriting, guitar, Hammond organ
- David Seaman – songwriting, guitar
- Greg Bones – guitar
- Alan Bremner – engineer, mixing production
- Paul Wright – engineer
- Stephane Sednaoui – photographer, designer
- Farrow Design – cover sleeve designer

== Charts ==
Weekly chart performance for "Did It Again"
Chart (1997–1998)	Peak position
Australia (ARIA)	15
Europe (Eurochart Hot 100)	58
Scottish Singles Sales (Official Charts)	9
UK Singles (Official Charts)	14
UK Airplay (Music Week)	23

== Certifications ==
Certifications and sales for "Did It Again"
Region	Certification	Certified units/sales
Australia (ARIA)	Gold	35,000^{^}
^{^} Shipments figures based on certification alone.
