= Confide in Me (2001 album) =

2002 album by Kylie Minogue

Compilation album by Kylie Minogue
- Released: 12 November 2002
- Genre: Pop; dance-pop; house; R&B
- Length: 77:57
- Label: Deconstruction

Kylie Minogue chronology
Fever (2001)	Confide in Me (2002)	KylieFever2002 (2002)

Confide in Me is a compilation album by Australian recording artist Kylie Minogue, which was released in November 2001. Released on 18 November 2002 by BMG, the album collects work from Minogue's Deconstruction period, including the albums Kylie Minogue (1994) and Impossible Princess (1997). The album was ineligible to chart on the main U.K. albums chart due to being considered a budget album, but had a chart run on the Budget Albums Chart from 2002 to 2005, peaking at #4 in 2003. It received mixed reviews from music critics; whilst they praised the tracks from Deconstruction period, they felt that the album was too similar to the compilation album Hits+.

== Background ==
Prior to being signed to Parlophone, Minogue's labels had decided to release material from her previous records. Confide in Me was released by BMG, along with her other compilation album's Hits+ (2000), Greatest Hits 87-92 (2002), Greatest Hits 87–97 (2002) and Artist Collection (2004). Ultimately, neither of the compilations achieved high success but Hits+ charted in the UK, while both Greatest Hits album charted in UK, Ireland and Japan.

The cover artwork uses pictures from the videos to "Breathe" and "Some Kind of Bliss".

== Reception ==
Professional ratings
Review scores
Source	Rating
AllMusic	3/5 stars

Confide in Me received mixed reviews from music critics. AllMusic highlighted "Some Kind of Bliss", "Time Will Pass You By" and "Confide in Me" as album highlights. Critics praised the album for its Deconstruction tracks, but felt it received no success because it was too similar to the album Hits+. An editor for Cduniverse explained: "Fans of those albums should consider checking out Confide in Me; while it doesn't feature the previously unreleased tracks that Hits + does, it does provide a more in-depth look at her two transitional albums."

The album was certified Silver by British Phonographic Industry (BPI), for shipments of 60,000 copies.

== Track listing ==
No.	Title	Writer(s)	Album	Length
1.	"Put Yourself in My Place"	Jimmy Harry	Kylie Minogue	4:56
2.	"Some Kind of Bliss"	Kylie Minogue; James Dean Bradfield; Sean Moore	Impossible Princess	4:16
3.	"Surrender"	Gerry DeVeaux; Charlie Mole	Kylie Minogue	4:27
4.	"If I Was Your Lover"	Harry	Kylie Minogue	4:47
5.	"Limbo"	Minogue; Dave Ball; Ingo Vauk	Impossible Princess	4:07
6.	"Did It Again"	Minogue; Steve Anderson; Dave Seaman	Impossible Princess	4:24
7.	"Through the Years"	Minogue; Ball; Vauk	Impossible Princess	4:22
8.	"Too Far"	Minogue	Impossible Princess	4:46
9.	"Say Hey"	Minogue	Impossible Princess	3:40
10.	"Time Will Pass You By"	Dino Fekaris; Nick Zesses; John Rhys	Kylie Minogue	5:28
11.	"Cowboy Style"	Minogue; Anderson; Seaman	Impossible Princess	4:48
12.	"Falling"	Neil Tennant; Chris Lowe	Kylie Minogue	6:46
13.	"I Don't Need Anyone"	Minogue; Bradfield; Nick Jones	Impossible Princess	3:15
14.	"Dreams"	Minogue; Anderson; Seaman	Impossible Princess	3:46
15.	"Jump"	Minogue; Rob Dougan	Impossible Princess	4:05
16.	"Drunk"	Minogue; Anderson; Seaman	Impossible Princess	4:01
17.	"Confide in Me"	Anderson; Seaman; Owain Barton	Kylie Minogue	5:52
Total length:				77:57

== Personnel ==
- Kylie Minogue – Vocals
- Dave Ball – Producer
- James Dean Bradfield – Producer
- Brothers in Rhythm – Producer
- Rob Dougan – Producer
- Dave Eringa – Producer
- Jimmy Harry – Arranger, Producer
- Pete Heller – Producer
- M People – Producer
- Ingo Vauk – Producer

== Certifications ==
Region	Certification	Certified units/sales
United Kingdom (BPI)	Silver	60,000^{^}
^{^} Shipments figures based on certification alone.
