= Hits + =

2000 album by Kylie Minogue

Compilation album by Kylie Minogue
- Released: 7 November 2000
- Recorded: 1993–1997
- Studio: Various
- Genre: Pop; dance; R&B; trip hop
- Length: 71:36
- Label: Deconstruction; Arista; Festival Mushroom
- Producer: Kylie Minogue; Brothers in Rhythm; Jimmy Harry; James Dean Bradfield; Dave Eringa; Dave Ball; Ingo Vauk; Tony Cohen; Victor Van Vugt; The Rapino Brothers; Steve Anderson; Uschi Classen; Pete Heller; Terry Farley

Kylie Minogue chronology
Light Years (2000)	Hits + (2000)	Fever (2001)

Hits + is a compilation album by Australian recording artist Kylie Minogue, which was released on 7 November 2000 by Deconstruction Records. The album was the last compilation album which was released by the record label at the time, because Minogue had released her then Parlophone album Light Years (2000). The album peaked at number sixty-three in Australia on the ARIA albums chart.

== Background ==
It was announced that Minogue would release a compilation with her songs from Deconstruction Records. The album was entitled Hits +. The photograph used for the original cover art was later scrapped in favour of another shot, from a 1995 session by Michael Williams.

"If You Don't Love Me" was originally recorded by British group Prefab Sprout for their 1992 album A Life of Surprises.

== Composition ==
The compilation is made up of songs from the albums Kylie Minogue (1994) and Impossible Princess (1997). The album includes all seven singles released during the time Minogue was under Deconstruction Records but does not include the Australian only single "Cowboy Style". The international release of Hits + contains only 15 tracks, omitting "This Girl" and just 14 tracks in the U.S. and China, where "Where the Wild Roses Grow" was also omitted.

== Reception ==
=== Critical response ===
Professional ratings
Review scores
Source	Rating
AllMusic	link

Hits + received positive reception from music critics, many praising it for its Deconstruction songs in a major compilation. Mackenzie Wilson from AllMusic gave it a very positive review, awarding the album four-and-a-half out of five stars. She had explained the album saying "Capitalizing on her surging popularity in the States, Arista found themselves promoting Kylie Minogue in early 2002 with the reissue of her Hits + album. This particular record highlights the cuts that made Minogue an indie darling in Europe in the mid-'90s, reflecting back on her 1994 self-titled effort and 1997's Impossible Princess. American fans might be put off just a bit, for this material is less frilly and far darker than Fever's smash single, 'Can't Get You Out of My Head'. But it's still stylish. Hits + is perfect for any fan, but it's also a great retrospective for those eager fans who are beginning to discover the wild musical world of Kylie Minogue."

=== Chart performance ===
The album debuted and peaked at number forty-one on the UK Albums Chart.

== Track listing ==
No.	Title	Writer(s)	Origin	Length
1.	"Confide in Me" (master mix)	Steve Anderson; Dave Seaman	from Kylie Minogue, 1994	5:51
2.	"Put Yourself in My Place" (radio edit)	Jimmy Harry	original version from Kylie Minogue	4:10
3.	"Where Is the Feeling?" (BIR Dolphin Mix)	Wilf Smarties; Jayn Hanna	original version from Kylie Minogue	4:10
4.	"Some Kind of Bliss"	Kylie Minogue; James Dean Bradfield; Moore	from Impossible Princess, 1997	4:13
5.	"Did It Again" (radio edit)	Minogue; Anderson; Seaman	original version from Impossible Princess	4:22
6.	"Breathe" (radio edit)	Minogue; Dave Ball; Ingo Vauk	original version from Impossible Princess	3:40
7.	"Where the Wild Roses Grow" (with Nick Cave and the Bad Seeds)	Nick Cave	from Murder Ballads, 1996	3:58
8.	"If You Don't Love Me"	Paddy McAloon	B-side of "Confide in Me", 1994	2:09
9.	"Tears"	Ball; Minogue; Vauk	B-side of "Did It Again", 1997	4:27
10.	"Gotta Move On"	Charlie Mallozzi; Marco Sabiu; Minogue	from the Kylie Minogue sessions	3:33
11.	"Difficult by Design"	Mallozzi; Sabiu; Minogue	from the Kylie Minogue sessions	3:40
12.	"Stay This Way"	Minogue; Anderson	from the Impossible Princess sessions	4:33
13.	"Automatic Love" (acoustic version)	Mallozzi; Sabiu; Minogue; Inga Humpe	original version from Kylie Minogue	4:21
14.	"Where Has the Love Gone?" (Roach Motel remix)	Alex Palmer; Julie Stapleton	B-side of "Confide in Me"	9:24
15.	"Take Me with You"	Minogue; Anderson	from the Impossible Princess sessions	9:05
Total length:				71:36

Australian & UK version
No.	Title	Writer(s)	Origin	Length
13.	"This Girl"	Minogue; Uschi Classen	from the Impossible Princess sessions	3:08
14.	"Automatic Love" (acoustic version)	Mallozzi; Sabiu; Minogue; Inga Humpe	original version from Kylie Minogue	4:21
15.	"Where Has the Love Gone?" (Roach Motel remix)	Alex Palmer; Julie Stapleton	B-side of "Confide in Me"	9:24
16.	"Take Me with You"	Minogue; Anderson	from the Impossible Princess sessions	9:11
Total length:				74:44

Note

- Track 7, "Where the Wild Roses Grow" (with Nick Cave and the Bad Seeds), was not included on copies of the album released in the United States and Canada.

== Personnel ==
Adapted from liner notes.

- Brothers in Rhythm – Producers (tracks 1, 3, 5, 8, 15); remixers (track 3)
- Jimmy Harry – Producer (track 2)
- Dave Eringa, James Dean Bradfield – Producers (track 4)
- Dave Ball, Ingo Vauk – Producers (tracks 6, 9)
- Nick Cave and the Bad Seeds, Tony Cohen, Victor Van Vugt – Producers (track 7)
- The Rapino Brothers – Producers (tracks 10, 11)
- Steve Anderson – Producer (tracks 12, 13)
- Heller & Farley – Producers, remixers (track 14)

== Charts ==
Chart performance for Hits +
Chart (2000)	Peak position
Australian Albums (ARIA)	63
Scottish Albums (OCC)	49
UK Albums (OCC)	41

== Certifications ==
Region	Certification	Certified units/sales
United Kingdom (BPI)	Silver	60,000^{*}
^{*} Sales figures based on certification alone.

== Release history ==
Release dates and formats for Hits +
Region	Date	Format(s)	Catalogue no.	Distributor(s)	Ref(s).
United Kingdom	2000	CD	74321 785342	Deconstruction; Arista	
Australia	2000	CD	333212	Mushroom	
United States	2000	CD	07822106042	Deconstruction; Arista; BMG	
Various	2000	Cassette	74321 80275 4	Deconstruction; Arista; BMG	
Japan	2001	CD	BVCM-31065	Deconstruction; Arista; BMG	
