= Put Yourself in My Place (Kylie Minogue song) =

1994 single by Kylie Minogue

Single by Kylie Minogue

from the album Kylie Minogue
- Released: 14 November 1994
- Studio: Axis, Power Station, Whorga Musica (New York City)
- Genre: Pop; trip hop
- Length: 4:54
- Label: Mushroom; Deconstruction
- Songwriter: Jimmy Harry
- Producer: Jimmy Harry

Kylie Minogue singles chronology
"Where Is the Feeling?" (1994)	"Put Yourself in My Place" (1994)	"Where the Wild Roses Grow" (1995)

Music video
- "Put Yourself in My Place" on YouTube

"Put Yourself in My Place" is a song recorded by Australian singer Kylie Minogue, taken from her fifth and eponymous studio album (1994). It was released as the record's second single on 14 November 1994, and was distributed by Deconstruction and Mushroom Records as a CD single, cassette tape and 12-inch vinyl. The track was written, arranged, and produced by Jimmy Harry, and was recorded in New York City with the parent album's engineer Doug Deangelis. A ballad that discusses themes of ending a relationship and moving on, the song's sound incorporates musical elements of trip hop and pop music.

Upon its release, "Put Yourself in My Place" received positive reviews from music critics, with the majority of them highlighting Minogue's vocal performance and complimenting the song's composition and production. Many reviews have cited it as one of the best single releases of her career. Commercially, the single charted moderately in Australia and the United Kingdom, peaking inside the top 20 in both regions. Additionally, it was certified gold by the Australian Recording Industry Association (ARIA) for physical shipments of 35,000 units.

An accompanying music video was directed by Kier McFarlane, with its plot being inspired by the 1968 film Barbarella; it featured Minogue impersonating the titular character in a spaceship while getting undressed. It won the Best Video award at the 1995 ARIA Music Awards. The song has been performed on Minogue's concert tours including Intimate and Live, On a Night Like This, KylieFever2002, Showgirl: The Greatest Hits Tour and Kylie Presents: Golden.

== Background and composition ==
"Put Yourself in My Place"
A 25-second sample of "Put Yourself in My Place", a song described by critics as a pop ballad with trip hop influences.

"Put Yourself in My Place" was written, arranged, and produced by American musician and songwriter Jimmy Harry. The track was recorded at Whorga Musica Studios, Axis Studios and Power Station Studios in New York City by Doug Deangelis, who served as the engineer and mixer for Minogue's fifth and eponymous studio album (1994); it was the only entry from the parent album that was recorded away from Minogue's home in the United Kingdom. British author Sean Smith, who had written a biography detailing Minogue's career, noted that "Put Yourself in My Place" was one of the singer's most personal yet favourite tracks. Musically, it is a ballad-inspired recording that incorporates musical elements of trip hop and pop music, as described by writers Adrian Denning and Hunter Felt from PopMatters. Chris True of AllMusic described the song as "slicker, more stylish, and less hooky than anything she had previously recorded." According to the demo sheet music at Sheet Music Direct published by Music Sales Group, the song is set in time signature of common time with a tempo of 78 beats per minute. During the opening sequence and first verse, it has a chord progression of F11–F–F11-F–F11-F–F11–F–F/A–F11–F, and Minogue's vocals span from B♭3 to E♭5. Julie Aspinall stated that the lyrical content is "about a woman who has never been able to get over her ex-boyfriend".

== Release ==
"Put Yourself in My Place" was released as the album's second single on 14 November 1994 and distributed by Deconstruction and Mushroom as a CD single, cassette tape and 12-inch vinyl. Two CD sets were made available in the United Kingdom and Australia; the first CD featured the radio mix of the single, two remixes, and one remix of Minogue's previous single "Confide in Me" (1994), whilst the second CD replaced the latter track with a remix to her follow-up single "Where Is the Feeling?" (1995). Two different CD formats were distributed in Germany and Japan; the former included two remixes of the song, and a remix of "Confide in Me", whilst the latter included two remixes of the single on a Mini CD. Two vinyl sets were published in the United Kingdom; one featured four remixes of "Put Yourself in My Place", whilst the second vinyl included the same track list as the latter, plus a remix for both "Confide in Me" and "Where Is the Feeling?". A cassette tape issued in that same territory featured the radio mix and one remix on both sides. The cover art for the two CD sets were photographs by British Rankin, and featured Minogue with headphones. According to the singer's friend William Baker, the shots of Minogue represented a "serious" approach to her music.

== Critical reception ==
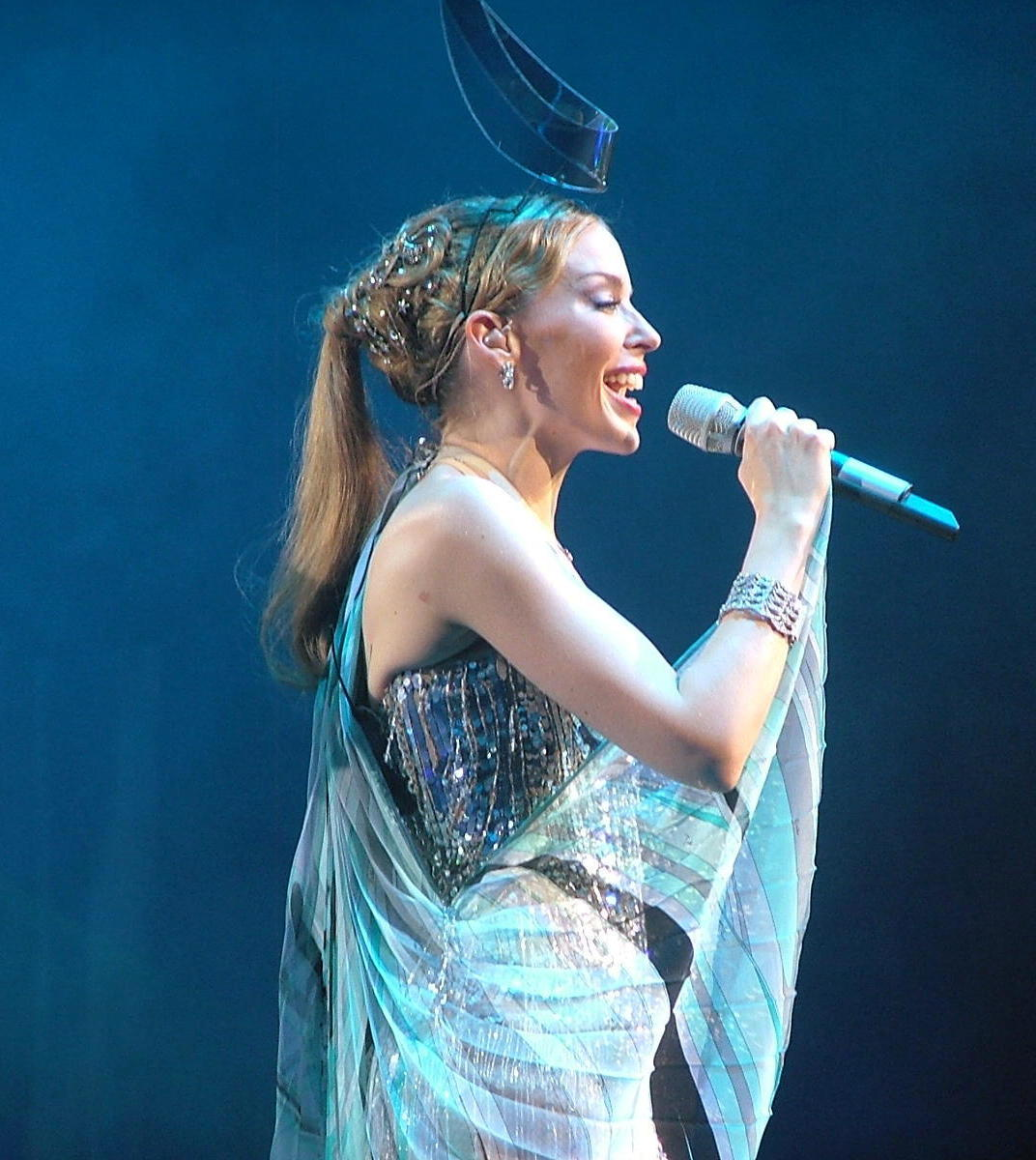
Minogue singing "Put Yourself in My Place" during Showgirl: The Greatest Hits Tour (2005)

"Put Yourself in My Place" received positive reviews from music critics. Jason Shawahn, writing for About.com, labelled the track as a "good" addition to her greatest hits compilation Ultimate Kylie (2004). British author and music critic Adrian Denning enjoyed the track, and felt it was one of the parent album's "finest" songs. He commented that "'Put Yourself in My Place' is sensual, slow and sports a delicious Kylie vocal full of maturity and actual power." Larry Flick from Billboard magazine called it "a cracker of a hip-hop ballad masterminded by Jimmy Harry." PopMatters' Quentin Harrison published a detailed analysis of Kylie Minogue, and noted that "Put Yourself in My Place" and her previous single "Confide in Me" showcased some of her best vocals. Harrison believed that the single, alongside "Confide in Me", represented Minogue's Deconstruction period the most. Similarly, Nick Levine from Digital Spy labelled the track a "classic". Marc Andrews from DNA Magazine also believed it was one of the better highlights on the album, and complimented its ballad-inspired production. Jude Rogers from The Guardian listed the track on her "10 of the Best Kylie Minogue Songs" list in June 2016 alongside complimenting the production and confessing, "The second single from Kylie Minogue saw its maker mastering the pop ballad." Writing for the Herald Sun, Cameron Adams ranked it at number 16 on his list of the singer's best songs, in honour of her 50th birthday, and called it "not only a vocal showcase, but just a damn fine tune".

In his weekly UK chart commentary, James Masterton wrote, "Prepare for an even greater shock: this is arguably the best record she has ever made, using her voice to perfect effect on this song." A reviewer from Music & Media commented, "Take the title literally, and you'll find yourself wearing Madonna's shoes. When the reborn Kylie sings a ballad it's convincingly romantic, erotic and sophisticated at the same time." Alan Jones from Music Week gave the song four out of five, calling it "a sweetly sung, dead slow ballad, constructed in Tears for Fears' ballad-style." Simon Williams from NME viewed it as "a fine old smooch, blessed as it is with the sort of airy, twisting chorus once so fashionable in the mid-'80s." James Hamilton from the RM Dance Update described it as a "gorgeous sultry soulful smoocher". Pete Stanton from Smash Hits gave it three out of five. Guillermo Alonso, from the Spanish edition of Vanity Fair, deemed it Minogue's eleventh greatest song as well as the best ballad of her career; he also praised it for sounding "unlike anything she had released". On a similar note, British magazine Classic Pop placed it at number 21 on their list of Minogue's 40 best songs; "dressed in the virtuous apparel of the classic lovestruck ballad, but as the chorus pierces this facade, Kylie’s voice is raw, intense, and saturated in the pain and frustration of a one-sided split".

== Commercial reception ==
Commercially, the single charted moderately in Australia and the United Kingdom, peaking inside the top 20 in both regions. It debuted at number 17 on the Australian Singles Chart, the third highest debut of the week. During its fifth week, it peaked at number 11, and eventually spent 11 weeks in the top 50 chart, marking it one of Minogue's longest-charting singles at the time. "Put Yourself in My Place" was certified gold by the Australian Recording Industry Association (ARIA) for physical shipments of 35,000 units in that region. It had a similar chart run on the UK Singles Chart, debuting at number 17 and peaking at number 11. It spent four weeks inside the top 20, and remained a nine editions inside the chart as one of the singer's longest-spanning recordings in that territory. In Scotland, the single debuted at number 23 on the Scottish Singles Chart and peaked at number 14 the following week. In Germany, it debuted at number 98 during the week ending 6 February 1995, and later peaked at number 87 in its second week alongside staying for four non-consecutive weeks in the chart.

== Music video ==
An accompanying music video was directed by Kier McFarlane, and its plot was inspired by 1968 film Barbarella. According to Minogue, she had been a "massive" fan of the film, and wanted to pay tribute to the film's lead actress Jane Fonda, who played the titular character. The video was shot in two days, where Kylie Minogue had been stripped with harnesses and wires; the majority of the shooting included wires pulling off her clothes during those particular sequences. The singer commented in her 2002 book Kylie: La La La that it was one of her "most painful shoots", and complained that she felt "rigged" into all sorts of "contraptions". Minogue further complained about the 19 hours spent on both filming days, and revealed she cried during some of the shooting; she jokingly concluded in the book that she would never do another visual that required harnesses and water. Minogue's characteristics in the video were loosely inspired by the titular character of Barbarella, for which a large staff that helped with styling, hair styling and make-up was required.

The video opens with a spacecraft travelling through space. Kylie Minogue enters a small room in the spacecraft, wearing a pink spacesuit, and subsequently takes off her helmet and gloves; intercut scenes through the video has the spacecraft travelling through different space fields and atmospheres. By the first chorus, Minogue starts taking off parts of her spacesuit whilst spacemen from different rooms witness her. Next, she turns on a machine that projects smoke and distracts them. She then becomes fully nude by the second chorus; this marks Kylie Minogue's first video that she has shown full nudity in until her 2001 advert campaign with Agent Provocateur. Another spaceman witnesses Minogue nude but she covers herself with a red blanket, and closes the window. The video ends with Minogue laying on a soft bedding, turning the lights off, and the spacecraft traveling to another destination.

The music video garnered positive critiques from critics and music publications. Julie Aspinall complimented Minogue's sexual appeal in the clip, and believed that the song itself was overshadowed by its visual presentation. William Baker also commended Minogue's fashion styling and loose portrayal of Fonda's Barbarella character. Sean Smith further analysed the visual more and found that Minogue, both at the time of the video's release and retrospectively, "was never shy about removing her clothes for the sake of her art [...] She suffered for her art." Jude Rogers from The Guardian labelled the clip "cheeky", whilst Erika Brooks Adickman from Idolator listed it as one of Minogue's most iconic and sexy music videos. At the 1995 ARIA Music Awards, Kylie Minogue won the award for Best Video. In retrospect, Minogue has cited the clip amongst her favourites.

== Live performances and other usage ==
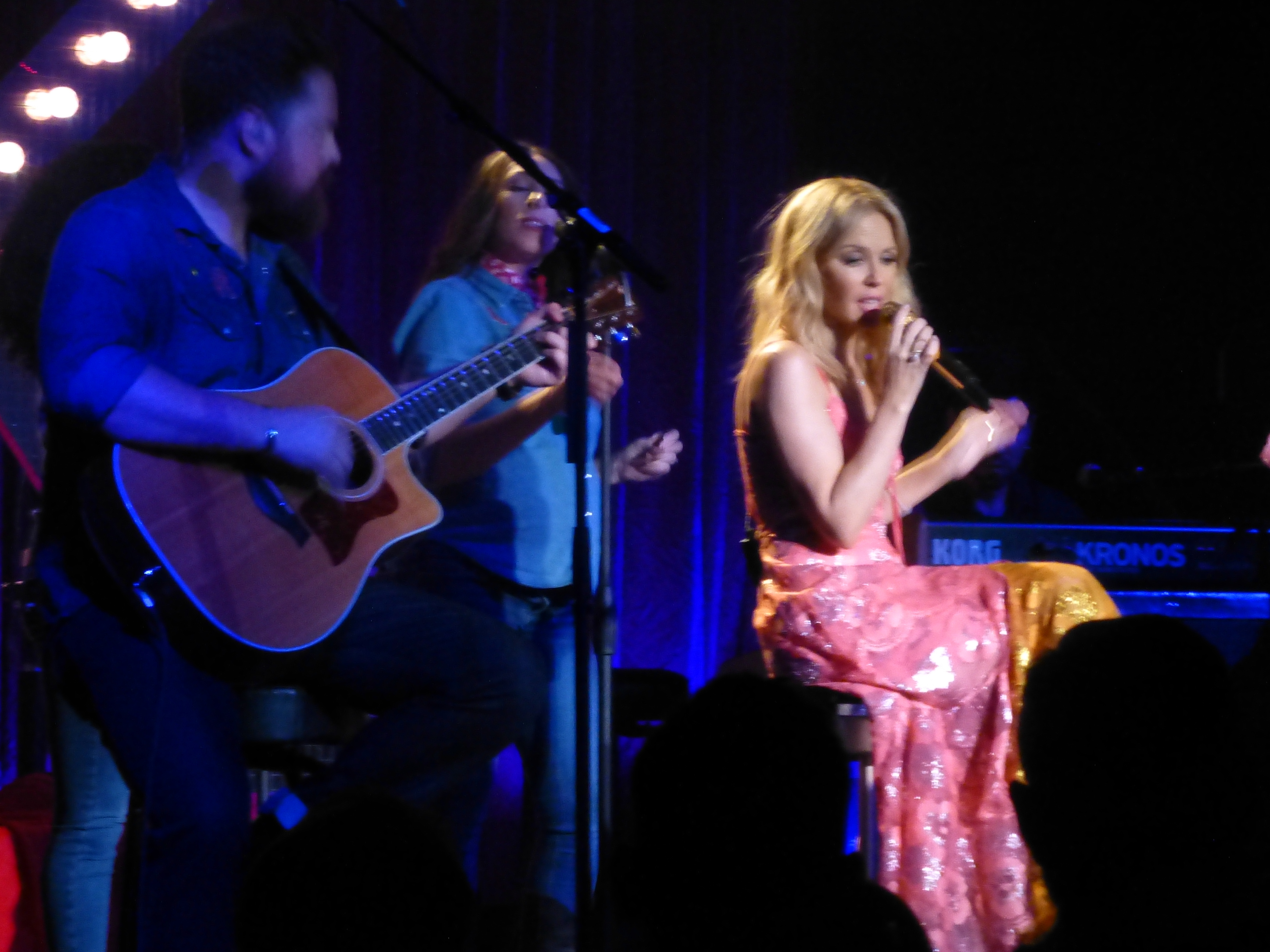
Minogue performing the song at New York City's Bowery Ballroom on 25 June 2018, as part of her Golden promotional tour

"Put Yourself in My Place" has been performed on some of Minogue's concert tours, and has appeared on several compilation albums. It was first performed live on Minogue's 1998 Intimate and Live concert tour in the opening segment. An unreleased acoustic version that was performed during the rehearsals of the tour was added on her extended play Live and Other Sides, which was released in Australia as a free gift with her sixth studio album Impossible Princess (1997). This version was sung as one of the opening tracks of her 2001 On a Night Like This Tour, and was included on the live DVD of the show. On her KylieFever2002 concert tour, the single was included on Minogue's "The Crying Game" medley which also featured the titular track, "Finer Feelings", and "Dangerous Game". The single's next appearance was on her 2005 Showgirl: The Greatest Hits Tour, where it appeared on her Minx in Space segment and served as one of the encore tracks. The song was not performed for thirteen years, until Minogue sang an acoustic version during her Golden promotional tour in 2018; writing for the Manchester Evening News, Katie Fitzpatrick praised the performance for being "beautifully stripped back [...] with some fabulously confident backing vocals coming from the smitten crowd".

Since its release, it has appeared on five of Minogue's greatest hits albums: Hits+ (2000), Confide in Me (2001), Ultimate Kylie (2004), Confide in Me: The Irresistible Kylie (2007) and Step Back in Time: The Definitive Collection (2019). The Driza-Bon remix was included on her 2010 remix album Essential Mixes. In 2012, British recording artist and producer MNEK covered the song and released it on his official SoundCloud page.

== Track listings ==
- Australian and UK CD1; Australian cassette single
1. "Put Yourself in My Place" (radio mix) – 4:11
2. "Put Yourself in My Place" (Dan's Quiet Storm Extended Mix) – 5:48
3. "Put Yourself in My Place" (Dan's Quiet Storm Club Mix) – 7:03
4. "Confide in Me" (Phillip Damien Mix) – 6:25
- Australian and UK CD2; Australian remix cassette single
1. "Put Yourself in My Place" (radio mix) – 4:11
2. "Put Yourself in My Place" (Driza-Bone Mix) – 4:50
3. "Put Yourself in My Place" (All-Star Mix) – 4:54
4. "Where Is the Feeling?" (Morales Mix) – 9:55
- UK 12-inch single

A1. "Put Yourself in My Place" (Dan's Quiet Storm Extended Mix) – 5:48
A2. "Put Yourself in My Place" (Dan's Quiet Storm Club Mix) – 7:03
B1. "Put Yourself in My Place" (Driza-Bone Mix) – 4:50
B2. "Put Yourself in My Place" (All-Star Mix) – 4:54

- UK cassette single and European CD single
1. "Put Yourself in My Place" (radio mix) – 4:11
2. "Put Yourself in My Place" (Dan's Quiet Storm Club Mix) – 7:03
- German CD single
1. "Put Yourself in My Place" (radio mix) – 4:11
2. "Put Yourself in My Place" (Dan's Quiet Storm Club Mix) – 7:03
3. "Where Is the Feeling?" (Morales Mix) – 9:55
- Japanese mini-CD single
1. "Put Yourself in My Place" (radio mix) – 4:11
2. "Put Yourself in My Place" (Dan's Quiet Storm Extended Mix) – 5:48

== Credits and personnel ==
Credits are adapted from the liner notes of Kylie Minogue:

Recording

- Mixed and recorded at Whorga Musica Studios, Axis Studios and Power Station Studios in New York City by Doug Deangelis.

Personnel

- Kylie Minogue – vocals, backing vocals
- Jimmy Harry – songwriter, composer, producer
- Kier McFarlane – music video director

== Charts ==
=== Weekly charts ===
Weekly chart performance for "Put Yourself in My Place"
Chart (1994–1995)	Peak position
Australia (ARIA)	11
Europe (Eurochart Hot 100)	46
Europe (European Hit Radio)	27
Germany (GfK)	87
Israel (Israeli Singles Chart)	4
Scottish Singles Sales (Official Charts)	14
UK Singles (Official Charts)	11
UK Airplay (Hit Music)	10

=== Year-end charts ===
Year-end chart performance for "Put Yourself in My Place"
Chart (1994)	Position
UK Singles (OCC)	110

Chart (1995)	Position
Australia (ARIA)	92

== Certifications ==
Certifications and sales for "Put Yourself in My Place"
Region	Certification	Certified units/sales
Australia (ARIA)	Gold	35,000^{^}
^{^} Shipments figures based on certification alone.

== Release history ==
Release dates and formats for "Put Yourself in My Place"
Region	Date	Format(s)	Label(s)	Ref.
United Kingdom	14 November 1994	12-inch vinyl; CD	Deconstruction	
Australia	28 November 1994	CD; cassette	Mushroom	
Japan	21 January 1995	Mini-CD	Deconstruction	
