= The Ben Elton Show =

- Starring: Ben Elton; Ronnie Corbett
- Country of origin: United Kingdom
- Original language: English
- No. of episodes: 8

Production
- Running time: 30 mins

Original release
- Network: BBC One
- Release: 16 April – 4 June 1998

The Ben Elton Show is a British comedy series, which aired on BBC in 1998. It was a comedy-variety show, a departure for Elton, as was his getting Ronnie Corbett do his classic "armchair monologues", although these became much racier. The show was criticised for Elton's departure from the social commentary he was known for, and the show was cancelled after its initial series.
