= Some Kind of Bliss =

1997 single by Kylie Minogue

Single by Kylie Minogue

from the album Impossible Princess
- B-side: "Limbo"; "Love Takes Over Me"
- Released: 8 September 1997
- Recorded: 1997
- Studio: Mayfair (London, England)
- Genre: Pop rock; Britpop
- Length: 4:13
- Label: BMG; Deconstruction; Mushroom
- Songwriters: Kylie Minogue; James Dean Bradfield; Sean Moore
- Producers: James Dean Bradfield; Dave Eringa

Kylie Minogue singles chronology
"Where the Wild Roses Grow" (1995)	"Some Kind of Bliss" (1997)	"GBI (German Bold Italic)" (1997)

Music video
- "Some Kind of Bliss" on YouTube

"Some Kind of Bliss" is a song by Australian recording artist Kylie Minogue, for her sixth studio album, Impossible Princess (1997). The song was released as the lead single from the album on 8 September 1997 through BMG, Deconstruction and Mushroom. Minogue co-wrote the track with James Dean Bradfield and Sean Moore while Bradfield and Dave Eringa produced it. Backed by guitar and drum instruments, "Some Kind of Bliss" is a Britpop track in which Minogue sings about feeling happy.

Early reviews of "Some Kind of Bliss" were critical towards Minogue's image and sound transition to rock music, while retrospective reviews have been more positive towards her songwriting and sonic experimentation. "Some Kind of Bliss" performed relatively poorly on international charts peaking at number 27 on the Australian Singles Chart, at 22 on the UK Singles Chart (her first solo release to miss the UK Top 20) and reaching number 46 on the New Zealand Singles Chart.

To promote "Some Kind of Bliss", she performed the track on Top of the Pops, MTV Australia live and the Australian TV series Hey Hey It's Saturday. It was later included on her 1998 concert tour Intimate and Live Tour. David Mould directed the music video to the single, featuring Minogue and actor Dexter Fletcher robbing a gas station. The song was later included in the track list of Minogue's compilation albums including Confide in Me (2002), Kylie Minogue: Artist Collection (2004), Confide in Me: The Irresistible Kylie (2007) and Step Back In Time: The Definitive Collection (2019).

== Background and release ==
After releasing the single "Where the Wild Roses Grow" with Australian rock band Nick Cave and the Bad Seeds on 2 October 1995, Minogue received acclaim from critics for her experimentation with rock music, who praised her transition from being the once-dubbed "singing budgie" to a mature woman. Because of this, Minogue, with the support of her then boyfriend Stephane Sednaoui, decided to experiment with her music for the upcoming album. Welsh musician James Dean Bradfield contacted Minogue's A&R Pete Hadfield, asking him what their current project was where Hadfield replied "Kylie Minogue's new album". He asked Hadfield if he could work with Minogue and was approved.

After Bradfield sent her a demo of the album track "I Don't Need Anyone", Minogue was dissatisfied with the lyrical content and re-wrote the track herself. Despite this, Minogue found it "difficult" to write the song so Bradfield had taken pieces of the original demo lyrics and mixed them with other lyrics she had written to create the finished product of "I Don't Need Anyone". She found this method of writing "intriguing" and wanted to do it again, so she decided to do this with "Some Kind of Bliss", writing it alongside Bradfield and Sean Moore. Minogue commented about this method, saying "He took one half of one set [of lyrics] and took another half from another set of lyrics and merged them together, which I found interesting because it was something I wouldn't have done because, in my mind they're two separate things." She later commented that she felt it worked together.

While in production for the album, creative production was handled by Minogue and producers Brothers in Rhythm. Deconstruction Records' A&R Pete Hadfield was concerned with the lack of single choices, where he felt the songs written by Minogue were not up to commercial standards. Because of this, a potential January 1997 single release was postponed to make the album "perfect". "Some Kind of Bliss" was released as the lead single from Impossible Princess on 8 September 1997. There are two songs on the CD editions off "Some Kind of Bliss": "Limbo", a track was rejected as a single, and a new song "Love Takes Over Me".

== Composition ==
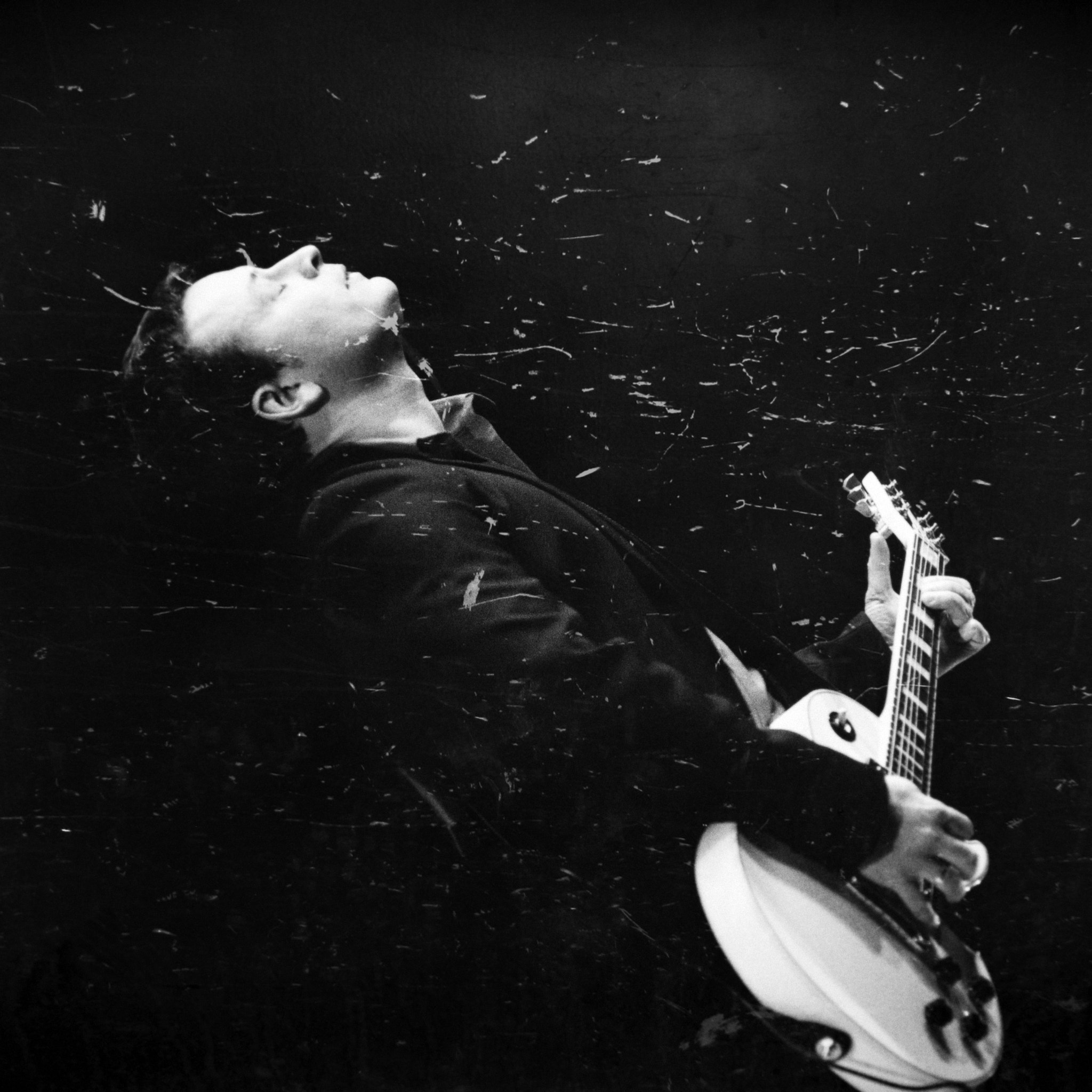
Produced by James Dean Bradfield, "Some Kind of Bliss" was compared to his band Manic Street Preachers.

"Some Kind of Bliss" was written by Minogue herself alongside Welsh performers James Dean Bradfield and Sean Moore, while the production was handled by Bradfield and Dave Eringa. It was recorded at Mayfair Studios, London, England in 1997 and was mixed by Alan Bremnar at Roundhouse Studios. It is a Britpop song with alternative rock and "rock-tinged" elements that lasts a duration of four minutes and thirteen seconds on the album. Instrumentally, "Some Kind of Bliss" features bass, electric and acoustic guitars, drums, string sections, flute, and a saxophone. Lyrically, the song is about Minogue's experiences while away from people and being happy, saying: "To me the song is about being able, not necessarily shut your eyes and feel that someone is there but the way where you are close to someone [...] the ability to feel like they're with you even if they are a million miles away."

A reviewer from Sputnikmusic said "'Some Kind of Bliss' is one of the more pop-rock songs that could have been part of her earlier work. This gem breaks up the dominance of the sleepy trance vibe to a more upbeat feel." Michael R. Smith from The Daily Vault felt that it was "surprisingly a strong and straightforward rock" song. Nick Levine from Digital Spy labelled the music as "Motowny Indie", while Sarah Smith from FasterLouder called it "pure pop". Priya from NME said "Some Kind of Bliss" is "a brassy 60's influenced number which has a totally Everything Must Go vibe to it." Martin Power, who wrote the biography Nailed to History: The Story of the Manic Street Preachers (2012) for the Manic Street Preachers, commented that "Some Kind of Bliss" was "far away from Minogue's glory days of 'I Should Be So Lucky' and 'Better the Devil You Know' as it was possible to get." A reviewer from The Australian noticed the transition from Minogue's earlier work by saying "The new single is not as heavily produced as her past songs, leaving her voice sounding edgier, and guitars take the place of the drum machine beats of earlier efforts."

== Critical reception ==
Initial reviews toward "Some Kind of Bliss" were mixed. Writing for NME in November 1997, Ben Willmott called it "supremely irritating" and stated "Kylie belts out the lyrics like she's reading from an autocue. Any soul is lost in a slurry of bought-in brass and a ropey guitar solo that's be more at home on a Shakin' Stevens record." John Magnan from The Age said while the song was a stand out to the album, it "is actually one of the album's clunkier tracks". A reviewer from Music Week awarded the song four stars out of five, stating "Kylie changes musical tack again with this dense, big sounding single, co-written with two of the Manics, which loudly announces she's back in style." Gareth Gorman said that while the song showcased Minogue's "thin vocals", he followed saying "it still works due to one of those melody lines that is inevitable stunning, simple and effective." Michael Dwyer from Western Australia magazine stated "Some Kind of Bliss and Did It Again have already proved our Kylie has more tricks up her sleeve this time that Stock, Aitken and Waterman ever dreamed of and her sixth album harbours more strings to her carefully-cultivated bow." Larry Flick from Billboard was positive, saying "Ms. Minogue has been reborn as an alterna-pop vixen to be reckoned with."

The song received more positive reviews in retrospect. Allmusic's Chris True had selected the song as an album stand out and a career stand out track. While reviewing her 2002 compilation Confide in Me, True stated “Impossible Princess, both of which found her stretching and growing beyond the pop princess image she had previously. Dark, noisy tracks like "Limbo," the trip-hoppy "Jump," and the more rock-oriented "I Don't Need Anyone" and "Some Kind of Bliss"—both of which were co-written by the Manic Street Preachers' James Dean Bradfield—found her trying on different styles to replace the bubblegum pop of the past". A reviewer from Who Magazine called the song "Funky , Spunky, Rocky, Big." Jaime Gill from Yahoo! Music reviewed her Ultimate Kylie compilation album, and criticised the musical composition by calling it an "awkward faux-rock". Matt James from PopMatters reviewed her compilation The Best of Kylie Minogue and was disappointed with "Some Kind of Bliss"' absence, labelling it a "lost classic". In 2017, Billboard ranked it as the 76th greatest pop song of 1997; Andrew Unterberger wrote that "the song's string-soaked guitar-pop remains surprisingly alluring, a fascinating glimpse at an alternate reality in which the disco diva is better remembered for ripped jeans than golden hot pants, and sounds no less like herself for it". Writing for the Herald Sun, Cameron Adams placed it at number 21 on his list of the singer's best songs in honour of her 50th birthday, calling it "the peak of 'Indie Kylie' [...] a modern retro '60s girl band garage pop heaven, filled with brass, sass and class".

== Chart performance ==
The song entered at number 27 on the Australian Singles Chart and fell to number 39 the following week. "Some Kind of Bliss" stayed in the chart for six weeks, and resulted as her lowest-charting lead single from an album until her single "Into the Blue" from Kiss Me Once (2014) peaked at number 46. The song entered and peaked at number 46 on the New Zealand Singles Chart for a sole week, her lowest charting single after her 1988 single "It's No Secret". (Note: In 2004, the New Zealand chart scheme changed from fifty positions to forty, after complaints against RIANZ (now known as Recorded Music NZ) regarding their similarity with the Australian Singles Chart positions. Although "Some Kind of Bliss" is her second lowest charting song through the fifty positions (after her 1988 single "It's No Secret"), her current lowest charting single with the updated scheme is her 2007 single "2 Hearts".) In the United Kingdom, "Some Kind of Bliss" entered at number 22 on 20 September 1997, which broke Minogue's consecutive top twenty hits and became her lowest solo single until "The One" from X (2007) at number 36 on 9 August 2008.

== Promotion ==
=== Music video ===
Minogue and Fletcher in the music video for "Some Kind of Bliss"

The music video was directed by David Mould and was shot in the Desert of Tabernas in Spain. The music video features Dexter Fletcher as Minogue's lover. The video is set in non-linear structure, as it opens with Minogue and Fletcher in a blue Pontiac Firebird at a gas station, with Minogue staring inside the gas station while Fletcher sits in the car after being released from jail. Several scenes feature Minogue and Fletcher in different outfits in different areas, driving and running around a hotel. There are scenes with Minogue and Fletcher fighting, being happy, and playing around in their hotel room.

During the bridge sequence, Minogue and Fletcher park in front of a shop, and Minogue seductively tries to distract the cashier outside by staring and posing at him, while Fletcher tries to steal money from the till. In the last scenes, Minogue is in another outfit trying to walk out of an alley with a bag of money, but sees a police car driving towards her and tries to walk off. Fletcher is caught by police and is escorted into the police car while yelling at Minogue. Minogue, who see the alteration, drives off with the money and looks back at Fletcher while driving down the street.

Robbie Daw from Idolator listed the video at eight on their Kylie Minogue's Sexiest Videos. Daw said "There's something so casually sexy about this Bonnie and Clyde-themed video. Kylie spends a lot of time wearing skimpy denim dresses while dealing with the fallout from her criminal love interest." The public had voted in which Minogue's video was the sexiest. Conversely, "Some Kind of Bliss" was put in last place with 1% of the votes (15 votes). The music video was featured on the first CD single of her November 1997 single "Did It Again", and was included on her video compilations: The Kylie Tapes 94–98 (1998), Greatest Hits 87–99 (2003) and Artist Collection (2004).

=== Live performances ===
To promote the single, Minogue performed the song on several televised shows. Her debut live performance of the single was on the Australian variety program Hey Hey It's Saturday. She went on to perform the single on MTV on 4 October 1997 and in the UK on both TFI Friday and Top of the Pops. "Some Kind of Bliss" was included on the set list for her 1998 concert tour Intimate and Live. The song was featured on the opening act for the tour and featured Minogue singing the track on stage, wearing a black long-collared shirt and three-quarter pants, similar to the costume off "Did It Again". Like the rest of the costumes on the tour including the performance off "Some Kind of Bliss", it features Minogue with a lot of "princess"-inspired outfits.

== Legacy and other usage ==
"Some Kind of Bliss" has been recognised by critics as Minogue's most "indie"-influenced song to date and one of her least successful singles to date. Author Lee Barron, who wrote the book Social Theory in Popular Culture, discussed the Impossible Princess period and further stated that "Some Kind of Bliss" was one of the main aspects for her "Indie Kylie" label in the media. Craig Mathieson, who wrote the book Playlisted: Everything You Need to Know about Australian Music Right Now (2009), stated about the song "It was a statement of intent, but not as planned. A sense of freedom, a belief in the lure of happiness, did not suit Kylie. She's best defined by constriction ad reduction, an her music has subsequently become a soundtrack to lack of choice."

The poor reception prompt Hadfield to release an apology to Minogue, blaming himself for not being in control of the promotion; "I loved her voice, got on with her and I am embarrassed that I failed her." Tom Parker, who wrote the liner notes for the 2003-release of Impossible Princess, had observed that critics slated "Some Kind of Bliss" due to Minogue's approach to "obtain lyrical and production credibility, which was overshadowed in whole". Minogue publicly commented about the single's aftermath "I think the static was that Elton had 75 percent of the sales that week, so mine didn't get off at a good start." She went on to say "I've told not to be frustrated, but I was frustrated because the album should be out [...] The point of it is to get it out and maybe people will like it, they may love it or they might hate it, but it was in my hands." She also felt guilt for parting with Stock Aitken Waterman after her production team with Deconstruction was not in good terms; she later commented that she departed on "good terms".

"Some Kind of Bliss" has been featured on many of Minogue's compilation albums. Its first appearance was on her 2000 Deconstruction greatest hits Hits+ and on her 2001 BMG greatest hits compilation album Confide in Me, a compilation consisting majority off her singles and tracks from her Deconstruction period; Heather Phares from Allmusic praised the Impossible Princess tracks including "Some Kind of Bliss". It then appeared on her 2004 compilation albums Artist Collection and, which included most of her Impossible Princess era. The appeared on the first disc of Confide in Me: The Irresistible Kylie released in July 2007 by UK independent label Music Club and her K25: Time Capsule by Warner Music Australia in October 2012. The song also appears on the third disc of Step Back in Time: The Definitive Collection released in November 2019. The Quivver remix appeared on her 1998 remix compilations Mixes and Impossible Remixes.

== Formats and track listings ==
CD single

1. "Some Kind of Bliss" – 4:13
2. "Limbo" – 4:06
3. "Some Kind of Bliss" (Quivver remix) – 8:39

7-inch single

1. "Some Kind of Bliss" (Radio edit) – 3:50
2. "Love Takes Over Me" – 4:14

12-inch single

1. "Some Kind of Bliss" (Quivver remix) – 8:39
2. "Some Kind of Bliss" (Quivver remix) – 8:39

Cassette single

1. "Some Kind of Bliss" – 4:13
2. "Limbo" – 4:06

== Personnel ==
Song credits

- Kylie Minogue – lead vocals, backing vocals
- James Dean Bradfield – guitar, bass
- Nick Nasmyth – keyboards
- Sean Moore – drums
- Andy Duncan – percussion

Visual credits

- Kylie Minogue – stand-in
- Stephane Sednaoui – photographer
- Farrow Designs – design

== Charts ==
Weekly chart performance for "Some Kind of Bliss"
Chart (1997)	Peak position
Australia (ARIA)	27
European Airplay (European Hit Radio)	32
New Zealand (Recorded Music NZ)	46
Scottish Singles Sales (Official Charts)	16
UK Singles (Official Charts)	22
UK Airplay (Music Week)	12
