= Cowboy Style =

1998 single by Kylie Minogue

Single by Kylie Minogue

from the album Impossible Princess
- B-side: "Love Takes Over Me"
- Released: 5 October 1998
- Studio: Real World (Box, England)
- Genre: Celtic pop; folktronica
- Length: 4:44
- Label: BMG; Deconstruction; Mushroom
- Songwriters: Kylie Minogue; Steve Anderson; Dave Seaman
- Producer: Brothers in Rhythm

Kylie Minogue singles chronology
| "Breathe" (1998) | "Cowboy Style" (1998) | "Spinning Around" (2000) |

Audio
- "Cowboy Style" on YouTube

"Cowboy Style" is a song recorded by Australian singer and songwriter Kylie Minogue, for her sixth studio album Impossible Princess (1997). The song was released as the fourth and final single in Australia only on 5 October 1998 through Mushroom Records. Minogue wrote the track with Steve Anderson and Dave Seaman while Brothers in Rhythm produced it. Backed by guitars, synthesisers and drum instruments, "Cowboy Style" is a Celtic pop track in which Minogue sings about her relationship with her then-boyfriend, French director Stephane Sednaoui. Critical response to "Cowboy Style" was positive, with praise driven to Minogue's songwriting and the song's composition; some critics highlighted it as a career stand-out track. Released in Australia and New Zealand, the song charted at number 39 on the Australian Singles Chart.

Minogue promoted "Cowboy Style" by performing it on her Intimate and Live Tour from June to August 1998. One of the live performances, directed by Michael Williams, was used as the music video. She later performed it on her Fever Tour (2002) and Showgirl: The Homecoming Tour (2006). The song was later included in the track list of Minogue's compilation albums Confide in Me (2002) and Confide in Me: The Irresistible Kylie (2007).

== Background ==
"Cowboy Style" was written by Minogue, Steve Anderson and Dave Seaman, and was one of the first songs composed for the album. Minogue wrote the song prior to being in a relationship with French photographer Stephane Sednaoui with different lyrical context, but it was completed while she was dating. Of the song, Minogue said "the way you start a new relationship with someone, they can bring out so many emotions within you and makes you question yourself a bit more." The title "Cowboy Style" comes from when she first met Sednaoui in person, where she recalled him looking "unusual" and felt like he was "the new cowboy coming into town".

Following the weak commercial performances of the album and its previous singles, Minogue left Deconstruction Records. While performing on her Intimate and Live concert tour in Australia, Minogue confirmed that she would release "Cowboy Style" as the fourth single in Australia and New Zealand by Mushroom Records. The single's artwork was shot during the Intimate and Live tour by Simon Emmert, which featured Minogue with a leather bra and a cowboy hat on. Idolator listed the artwork as one of "Kylie's Best Single Covers", saying "Leather bra and a cowboy hat. Enough said." An unedited shot of the cover was featured in her Kylie photo album book, released in August 1999.

== Composition ==
"Cowboy Style" was recorded at Real World Studios, Sarm West and DMC Studios in London, England and was mixed by Alan Bremner at Real World. Instrumentally, Greg Bones and Anderson played the guitar, Johnnie Hardie played the fiddle, and all other instrumentals played by Anderson. "Cowboy Style" is a Celtic pop song that lasts a duration of four minutes and forty-four seconds. Sal Cinquemani from Slant Magazine commented that "Cowboy Style features a tribal percussion break and a string quartet that sounds more Celtic than country." Online music critic Adrian Denning compared the song to the work of Icelandic recording artist and songwriter Björk. Nick Levine from Digital Spy said "Oh, and in 'Cowboy Style', it has a track that manages to sound a little bit Celtic and a little bit Middle Eastern. Pete Waterman must have wept."

== Reception ==
"Cowboy Style" received positive reviews from music critics. A reviewer from Who magazine was positive towards the track, stating it was "an almost Eastern feel under a free-flowing melody", as well as "classic poppy Kyles." Cameron Adams from Herald Sun also commended the track, saying it "manages to border from country music and remain cool." Gary James from Entertainment Focus praised all the songs on Impossible Princess written by Minogue, and selected "Cowboy Style", along with "Say Hey", "Too Far" and "Limbo", as tracks in which the singer was able to portray a "sense of claustrophobia and uncertainty". According to Stockport Times' Anthony Loman, Brothers in Rhythm's production, as well as its "electric fiddle", make the song "work well". Owen Myers of Pitchfork labelled it as one of the "slight almost-anthems" from the album.

John Mangan from The Age was positive in his review, saying the song was a "funky hoe-down sound". Online critic Adrian Denning found the track "impressive, eastern flavored". Louis Virtel from The Backlot listed the song at number 11 on their list of Minogue's best songs and stated: "This stylistic mishmash (featuring a deep Celtic sound that, maybe, Alison Krauss could fiddle along with) is a hard-driving, adrenalized, sexualized quest for freedom. How do you deal with the fact that Kylie sings, 'I am frightened, I'm aroused, I'm enlightened to the now' and totally sells it?" Josh Martin from MTV Australia placed the track at number 16 on his list of Minogue's best singles, commenting it was "one of the richest instrumentals on Impossible Princess". "Cowboy Style" entered on the ARIA Charts at number 39 on 18 October 1998. It became the lowest charting single from the Impossible Princess album.

== Promotion ==
=== Music video ===
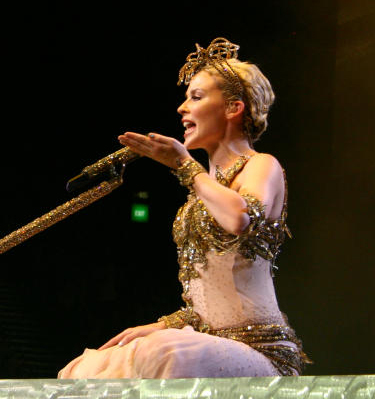
Minogue performing "Cowboy Style" during Showgirl: The Homecoming Tour (2006)

The music video for "Cowboy Style" was directed by Michael Williams and taped at a sound check at one of the Intimate and Live shows in June 1998. The music video was dubbed with the radio edit, and it was featured on the CD single. The music video was released on the DVD version of Greatest Hits 87–99 in June 2003.

=== Live performances ===
Minogue performed "Cowboy Style" on the Australian morning TV series Hey Hey It's Saturday. Minogue included the song on the set list for her 1998 concert tour Intimate and Live. The performance was recorded on 30 June and 1 July at Capitol Theatre in Sydney, and appeared on the related CD and DVD. The live version also appeared on her promotional single "Dancing Queen". "Cowboy Style" was included on her 2002 Australian and European Fever Tour. The performance featured Minogue standing on a level of staircases, dressed in a bright-pink sleeveless jacket with white cargo pants. The performance was recorded on 4 May 2002 at Manchester Arena in Manchester, England, and was released on 4 November that same year. The song's most recent performance was on the Showgirl: The Homecoming Tour in 2006. The performance was recorded on 12 November 2006 in Sydney, Australia and was released as a double CD set.

== Other usage ==
"Cowboy Style" was released in mid-1997 in the UK on a cassette tape with all other album tracks as part of a promotional release and a CD sampler. "Cowboy Style" has been featured on many of Minogue's compilation albums. Its first appearance was on her 2002 BMG greatest hits compilation album Confide in Me, a compilation consisting majority of her singles and tracks from her Deconstruction period; Heather Phares from AllMusic praised the Impossible Princess tracks including "Cowboy Style". It then appeared on her 2003 compilation album Greatest Hits: 87–99, and her 2004 album Artist Collection, which included most of her Impossible Princess era. It appeared on the first disc of Confide in Me: The Irresistible Kylie released in July 2007 by UK independent label Music Club and her K25: Time Capsule by Warner Music Australia.

== Formats and track listings ==
CD single

1. "Cowboy Style" (radio edit) – 3:51
2. "Love Takes Over Me" (single version) – 4:09
3. "Cowboy Style" (music video)

Digital music video download

1. "Cowboy Style" (music video) – 3:51

== Personnel ==
Personnel are adapted from the album's liner notes.

- Kylie Minogue – vocals, songwriting, vocal production
- Steve Anderson – songwriting, guitar, drums, keyboards
- David Seaman – songwriting, guitar, drums
- Greg Bones – guitar
- Alan Bremner – engineer, mixing production
- Paul Wright – engineer
- Johnnie Hardie – fiddle
- Stéphane Sednaoui – photography
- Andrew Murabito – sleeve design

== Charts ==
Weekly chart performance for "Cowboy Style"
| Chart (1998) | Peak position |
|---|---|
| Australia (ARIA) | 39 |
