= William Baker (fashion designer) =

Fashion designer, stylist, author and theatre director

- Born: 1973 (age 52–53)
- Education: King's College London
- Occupations: Fashion designer, fashion journalist, stylist
- Known for: Styling Kylie Minogue

William Baker (born 1973) is a fashion designer, fashion journalist, stylist, author and theatre director, best known for his past work with musician Kylie Minogue.

Baker attended the Manchester Grammar School, from where he went on to study theology at King's College London. He was the inspiration for Manchester indie band The Man From Delmonte's song "Pink". While studying he worked as a sales assistant for Vivienne Westwood where he met the singer Kylie Minogue and her photographer Katerina Jebb.

== Other work ==
In 2007, he made his debut as a theatre director with a West End revival of Rent dubbed Rent Remixed which received poor reviews. When asked beforehand how he was going to handle the change in direction, he claimed he said; "I'm approaching it in the same way I would approach a Kylie show or tour".

He has also worked with the musical acts Garbage, Tricky, Björk, Tori Amos, Reef and Jamiroquai on album and single covers, and music videos.

He collaborated with Jay Kay of Jamiroquai on the costume and set design for both the A Funk Odyssey album cover and tour.

Baker worked as stylist for Britney Spears on her 2009 The Circus Starring Britney Spears tour.

He has also been credited as director of British pop singer Leona Lewis' debut tour The Labyrinth, which was filmed in the London O2 Arena for a DVD/CD release.
