= Chocolate (Kylie Minogue song) =

2004 single by Kylie Minogue

Single by Kylie Minogue

from the album Body Language
- B-side: "City Games"; "Love at First Sight" (live)
- Released: 28 June 2004
- Recorded: 2003; 2004 (single version)
- Studio: El Cortijo (Marbella, Spain)
- Genre: Disco; funk; quiet storm
- Length: 5:00 (album version); 4:02 (single version)
- Label: Festival Mushroom; Parlophone
- Songwriters: Karen Poole; Johnny Douglas
- Producer: Johnny Douglas

Kylie Minogue singles chronology
| "Red Blooded Woman" (2004) | "Chocolate" (2004) | "I Believe in You" (2004) |

Music video
- "Chocolate" on YouTube

"Chocolate" is a song by Australian recording artist Kylie Minogue, taken from her ninth studio album, Body Language (2003). It was written and produced by Johnny Douglas, with additional writing by Karen Poole. The song is a ballad that uses a chocolate simile to describe Minogue's obsession with love. It is a quiet storm song that contains elements of disco and funk and employs breathy and whispery vocals. It was released as the third and final single from the album on 28 June 2004 by Festival Mushroom Records and Parlophone.

Critical reception towards "Chocolate" was mixed; some critics favoured its commercial appeal and Minogue's vocals, while some criticised it for being dated. In Australia, the song failed to reach the top 10, peaking at number 14. It charted higher in the United Kingdom, where it became Minogue's 27th top-10 hit after it debuted at number six on the UK Singles Chart. The single also charted inside the top 20 in Hungary and Italy.

A music video for "Chocolate" was directed by Dawn Shadforth and was envisioned as a tribute to Metro-Goldwyn-Mayer musicals. It chiefly features Minogue and numerous backup dancers in a hall, performing a dance routine choreographed by Michael Rooney. The song was performed live by Minogue at the one-off concert show Money Can't Buy and TV show Top of the Pops. "Chocolate" was included on the setlist of the singer's Showgirl: The Greatest Hits and Showgirl: Homecoming tours.

== Background and composition ==
"Chocolate" (2004)
Minogue delivers breathy synthesised vocals, evident in this 30-second sample of the chorus, as she compares her romantic infatuation to chocolate.

Following the global success of her eighth studio album Fever, Minogue began working on her ninth studio album Body Language. Aiming to create a dance-pop album inspired by electronic music from the 1980s, Minogue enlisted collaborators such as Johnny Douglas (who had previously worked with her on Light Years) and Karen Poole. The duo wrote "Chocolate" together, while Douglas also handled the production of the song. According to Minogue's official website, "Chocolate" was one of her favorites from the album. In an interview, producer Johnny Douglas stated that an original version of the song was to feature rapper Ludacris. Information about the collaboration leaked online in a Kylie forum, it appeared that fans did not want Kylie to collaborate with Ludacris. Fearing backlash of her fans, the rap was removed from the final version of the song. With the rap being removed, Johnny Douglas had to come up with a section for Kylie to sing in place of the rap. Co-writer Karen Poole was not in the studio, therefore Johnny had to create a new section himself as Kylie Minogue was to finish recording the song that afternoon. It was selected as the third single from Body Language and was released globally on 28 June 2004 by Festival Mushroom Records and Parlophone. The Maxi CD version of the single contains the B-side "City Games", which was one of the first tracks recorded for the album.

"Chocolate" is a ballad that borrows influences from numerous genres including disco, quiet storm and funk music. Minogue's vocals are synthesised and are delivered in a breathy and whispery manner. According to music magazine Spin, the song describes Minogue's "addiction to love" through a chocolate simile. PopMatters critic Adrien Begrand called its lyrics "steamy", citing the line "Hold me and control me and then/ Melt me slowly down" as an example. Helen Pidd from The Guardian found the lyrics to be "packed with saccharine innuendo."

== Reception ==
=== Critical response ===
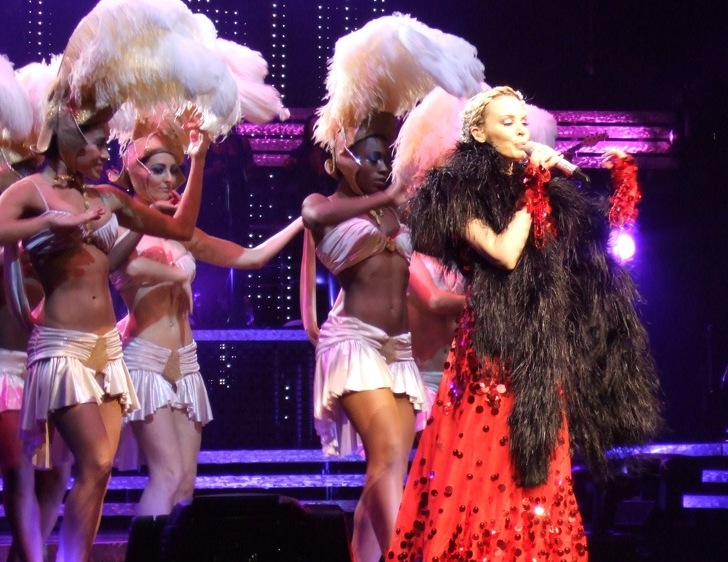
Minogue and her dancers performing "Chocolate" during Showgirl: The Homecoming Tour (2006)

The A.V. Club critic Andy Battaglia felt the ballad was successful in terms of execution and described it as "a breeze of finger-snap funk." Adrien Begrand from PopMatters singled it out as a highlight from the second half of Body Language, commenting that it "keeps the last half of the album from being a complete waste of time." Favouring Minogue's vocal performance, Eric Seguy from Stylus Magazine wrote: "Kylie proves herself to be a consummate entertainer, breezing through the chill muzak of "Promises" and "Chocolate"'s wild disco jam with equal ease." Slant Magazine editor Sal Cinquemani likened Minogue's vocals to that of British electronic music duo Mono and felt the tone of the song resembled the "gauzy melancholy" of Madonna's 1994 album Bedtime Stories. A mixed review came from The Guardian critic Helen Pidd, who acknowledged the song's commercial appeal but felt it "sounds too dated to pack any punch in the age of Beyoncé and Missy Elliott." Spin magazine criticised the vocals for being over-processed and the lyrics for lacking substance. The magazine also felt that the theme of the song had already been covered by "minor artists" like American singer–songwriter Mandy Moore.

Retrospective critical reviews of "Chocolate" have been favourable. Writing in The Monthly in 2021, Lesley Chow described the song, along with Body Language's lead single "Slow", as "surely two of the most riveting marriages of art and music ever produced", adding that "with these releases, Kylie and her team became part of an unlikely vanguard in pop". Writing for the Herald Sun, Cameron Adams placed it at number 45 on his list of the singer's best songs in honour of her 50th birthday, calling it "the most breathless of all her songs — she sounds like she recorded it after running around the block five times. Yet it's still ultra sexy — Kylie's never crossed the line from sexy to skanky and it's an increasingly fine line". Guillermo Alonso, from the Spanish edition of Vanity Fair, said that "if there was a successful R&B approach [made by the singer] in the 21st century, it was undoubtedly 'Chocolate', a sophisticated, sensual and enveloping song".

=== Commercial performance ===
In Minogue's native Australia, "Chocolate" debuted and peaked at number 14 on the ARIA Singles Chart, becoming her first single since "Your Disco Needs You" (2001) to miss the top 10. Its chart run was brief and lasted for four weeks. Similarly, it entered the top 20 of the Italian Singles Chart at number 14 and dropped out the next week. The single was more successful in the United Kingdom, entering and peaking at number six on the UK Singles Chart and spending a total of seven weeks inside the top 100; it became Minogue's 27th top-ten hit in the country.

== Music video ==
Minogue performing a dance routine with numerous backup dancers in the video, dressed in a pleated red organza dress designed by Austrian fashion designer Helmut Lang

The music video for "Chocolate" was directed by Dawn Shadforth, while the dance sequences were choreographed by Michael Rooney. Shadforth and Rooney had previously worked with Minogue on the video of her 2001 single "Can't Get You Out of My Head". The video was conceptualised as a tribute to old musicals produced by American media company Metro-Goldwyn-Mayer. It featured a 40-second long ballet routine for which Minogue was coached by Rooney for four days. She admitted that the practice sessions were exhausting, but felt the final product became "classy" as a result. The singer felt "lucky" to be able to incorporate a ballet routine in the video and opined that it was "a lot different" from the rest of her repertoire. Julie Aspinall, author of the book Kylie: Queen of the World, wrote that Minogue adopted a "Gallic chic style" for the video. Aspinall felt that Minogue "absolutely looked the part" and suggested it was due to her being influenced by then-boyfriend Olivier Martinez, a French actor. At the 10th Annual American Choreography Awards in 2004, Rooney was nominated for the "Outstanding Achievement in Choreography – Music Video" award for "Chocolate".

The video begins with a shot of Minogue posing in a dark room, dressed in a sparkling costume on which rainbow-lighting is projected. She is then shown in front of a wall wearing a flowing maroon dress. As the intro ends and the first verse commences, Minogue appears in a hall and performs various dance routine with numerous female dancers clad in nude bodysuits. The singer's attire consists of a pleated red organza dress designed by Austrian fashion designer Helmut Lang (in 2006, Minogue donated this costume to the Arts Centre Melbourne museum, where it is displayed in the Kylie Minogue Collection). Shots of the dancers in kaleidoscopic arrangements are intercut. A few seconds later, Minogue and a man dance together alone in a hall. Their dance ends with the man slowly laying Minogue down on the floor and leaving. Twelve women in golden and pastel pink dresses are seen dancing on a dark brown floor, which is revealed to be Minogue's hat as the camera pans out. She proceeds to wave to a distant person and then plucks the petals out of a pink rose she is holding. The rest of the video randomly intersperses all of the previous scenes. Complimenting the video's cinematography, arts and music writer Lesley Chow described it as "a deliriously romantic vision of surrender", adding: "Shadforth's depiction of warm bodies in a sensual world must be one of the most compelling realisations of the female gaze on film."

== Live performances ==
A one-off concert show, Money Can't Buy, was held at entertainment venue Hammersmith Apollo, London, on 15 November 2003 to promote Body Language. "Chocolate" was included on the set list of the concert and was performed during the second act "Bardello". On 25 June 2004, Minogue appeared on British music chart television programme Top of the Pops to perform the song live. She sang "Chocolate" for the second time on the programme on 9 July.

"Chocolate" was included on the set list of Minogue's Showgirl: The Greatest Hits Tour in 2005. Minogue was unable to complete the tour as she was diagnosed with early breast cancer and had to cancel the Australian leg of the tour. After undergoing treatment and recovery, she resumed the concert tour in the form of Showgirl: The Homecoming Tour in 2006, and "Chocolate" was again added to the set list.

== Formats and track listings ==
"Love at First Sight" was recorded live at Hammersmith Apollo on 15 November 2003.

- Australian CD maxi-single
1. "Chocolate" (radio edit) – 4:02
2. "City Games" (Kylie Minogue, Karen Poole, Richard Stannard, Julian Gallagher) – 3:44
3. "Chocolate" (Tom Middleton Cosmos mix) – 7:31
4. "Chocolate" (EMÓ mix edit) – 4:32
5. "Love at First Sight" (live) – 4:59
6. "Chocolate" (video)
- Australian and New Zealand digital EP
1. "Chocolate" (radio edit) – 4:02
2. "City Games" – 3:44
3. "Chocolate" (Tom Middleton Cosmos mix) – 7:31
4. "Chocolate" (EMÓ mix edit) – 4:32
5. "Love at First Sight" (Money Can't Buy live) – 4:59
- UK and European 12-inch picture disc

A1. "Chocolate" (Tom Middleton Cosmos mix) – 7:31
A2. "Chocolate" (radio edit) – 4:02
B1. "Chocolate" (EMÓ mix) – 6:54

- UK and European CD single
1. "Chocolate" (radio edit) – 4:02
2. "Love at First Sight" (live) – 4:59
- UK and European CD maxi-single
1. "Chocolate" (radio edit) – 4:02
2. "City Games" – 3:44
3. "Chocolate" (Tom Middleton Cosmos mix) – 7:31
4. "Chocolate" (EMÓ mix edit) – 4:32
5. "Chocolate" (video)
- Digital download (Remixes)
1. "Chocolate" (EMÓ dub) – 7:52
2. "Chocolate" (EMÓ mix) – 6:54
3. "Chocolate" (Tom Middleton Cosmos mix) – 7:31
- Digital download – "City Games"
1. "City Games" – 3:42

== Charts ==
=== Weekly charts ===
2004 weekly chart performance for "Chocolate"
| Chart (2004) | Peak position |
|---|---|
| Australia (ARIA) | 14 |
| Austria (Ö3 Austria Top 40) | 58 |
| Belgium (Ultratip Bubbling Under Flanders) | 2 |
| Belgium (Ultratip Bubbling Under Wallonia) | 3 |
| CIS Airplay (TopHit) | 111 |
| CIS Airplay (TopHit) Remix | 131 |
| European Hot 100 Singles (Billboard) | 17 |
| France (SNEP) | 69 |
| Germany (GfK) | 43 |
| Greece (IFPI) | 14 |
| Hungary (Single Top 40) | 7 |
| Ireland (IRMA) | 26 |
| Italy (FIMI) | 14 |
| Netherlands (Dutch Top 40 Tipparade) | 3 |
| Netherlands (Single Top 100) | 45 |
| Romania (Romanian Top 100) | 2 |
| Russia Airplay (TopHit) | 83 |
| Russia Airplay (TopHit) Remix | 172 |
| Scottish Singles Sales (Official Charts) | 10 |
| Switzerland (Schweizer Hitparade) | 53 |
| UK Singles (Official Charts) | 6 |

=== Year-end charts ===
2004 year-end chart performance for "Chocolate"
| Chart (2004) | Position |
|---|---|
| UK Singles (OCC) | 139 |

== Release history ==
Release dates and formats for "Chocolate"
| Region | Date | Format(s) | Label(s) | Ref. |
|---|---|---|---|---|
| Germany | 28 June 2004 | CD; maxi CD | EMI | |
| United Kingdom | 28 June 2004 | 12-inch vinyl; CD; maxi CD | Parlophone | |
| France | 29 June 2004 | 12-inch vinyl; maxi CD | Capitol | |
| Australia | 5 July 2004 | Maxi CD | Festival Mushroom | |
