= Love at First Sight (Kylie Minogue song) =

2002 single by Kylie Minogue

- Cover for CD1 and digital download

Single by Kylie Minogue

from the album Fever
- B-side: "Baby"; "Can't Get Blue Monday Out of My Head"
- Released: 3 June 2002
- Studio: Windmill Lane (Dublin)
- Genre: Dance-pop; nu-disco
- Length: 3:57
- Label: Festival Mushroom; Parlophone; Capitol
- Songwriters: Kylie Minogue; Richard "Biff" Stannard; Julian Gallagher; Ash Howes; Martin Harrington
- Producers: Richard "Biff" Stannard; Julian Gallagher

Kylie Minogue singles chronology
"In Your Eyes" (2002)	"Love at First Sight" (2002)	"Come into My World" (2002)

Music video
- "Love at First Sight" on YouTube

"Love at First Sight" is a song recorded by Australian singer Kylie Minogue for her eighth studio album Fever (2001). It was written by Minogue, Ash Howes, and Martin Harrington alongside its producers Richard "Biff" Stannard and Julian Gallagher. The song was released as the third single from Fever on 3 June 2002 by Festival Mushroom, Parlophone and Capitol Records. Musically, "Love at First Sight" is a dance-pop and nu-disco song which, lyrically, describes the singer falling and believing in love at first sight.

"Love at First Sight" received generally positive reviews from music critics; the majority of the critics commended the song's commercial appeal and composition. Minor criticism was towards the production similarities of Minogue's previous singles from Fever. Commercially, it peaked at number three on the ARIA Singles Chart and number two on the UK Singles Chart. It was certified platinum by the British Phonographic Industry (BPI) and gold by the Australian Recording Industry Association (ARIA). It also charted within the top ten in Canada, Denmark, Ireland, Spain, and New Zealand. In the United States, "Love at First Sight" peaked at number 23 on the Billboard Hot 100 (her most recent top-40 hit) and number one on the Dance Club Play chart.

The accompanying music video for "Love at First Sight" was directed by Johan Renck and features Minogue and her backup dancers in a futuristic maze, all shot in single take motion. The song was first performed on her KylieFever2002 tour and has been featured on all her tours with the exception of the Anti Tour. "Love at First Sight" received a Grammy Award nomination for Best Dance Recording at the 45th Annual Grammy Awards, becoming Minogue's first Grammy nomination.

== Background and release ==
Following the initial success of Fever and the album's subsequent singles "Can't Get You Out of My Head" and "In Your Eyes", Minogue's label Parlophone decided to release a third single worldwide. Minogue enlisted several producers including Richard Stannard and Julian Gallagher from Biffco, both whom work with Minogue previously; the duo wrote "Love at First Sight", alongside Minogue, Ash Howes and Martin Harrington. It was selected as the third, and second in North America, single from Fever, and was released on 3 June 2002. The single's artwork for "Love at First Sight" was photographed by Nick Knight. During 2002, Minogue launched her Love Kylie lingerie collection and enlisted Knight to photograph her to promote it; out takes were later re-used for the artwork of "Love at First Sight". Knight worked with Minogue once more on "Come into My World". The first artwork features Minogue nude, in front of a blue backdrop and the second disc is a close-up of Minogue with a red tint.

== Composition ==
"Love at First Sight"
A 21-second sample of "Love at First Sight" containing a part of the chorus. The title and theme of the song allude to the Western literature trope love at first sight.

Produced by Richard Stannard and Julian Gallagher, "Love at First Sight" is a dance-pop and nu-disco song, that came at the end of a period when mainstream dance-pop music had assimilated French house. The song incorporates elements of house music. "Love at First Sight" talks about falling in love with someone "at first sight"; According to Jacqueline Hodges from BBC Music, she said along with the title track, "use tempting lyrics and suggestive panting to underpin a none-too-subtle good time agenda." There are two versions of "Love at First Sight"; the original 2001 album version that lasts for three minutes and 57 seconds, and the North American remix. The North American remix, remixed by Ruff and Jam, was released on the bonus disc of the 2002 special edition of Fever and 12-inch singles of "Love at First Sight".

== Critical reception ==
'Can't Get You Out of My Head' and 'Love at First Sight' are two of the best songs of the last five years, they both provide a perfect synthesis of Kylie's pop princess appeal and her admirable exploration of experimental electronic music. 'Love at First Sight' might even be better, a poppier and even stranger song. Kylie had the audacity to basically rewrite Daft Punk's immortal 'Digital Love' and somehow may have even made it even more perfect than it already was. These songs are super-dense sound collages full of tiny strange little details that reward headphone listening while encouraging, perhaps demanding, dancing.

— Hunter Felt from PopMatters retrospectively commended "Love at First Sight"

"Love at First Sight" received positive reviews from music critics. Chris True from AllMusic was favorable towards the track saying "songs like 'Give It to Me' and 'Love at First Sight,' her maturity helps transcend this limiting tag, making this a very stylish Eurodance record that will appeal to all ages." Alex Needham from NME said the song was "a knickers-aloft disco stormer", while Alexis Petridis from The Guardian commented "Like Robbie Williams's songs, the tracks on Fever are big on easily digestible EDM references. 'Love at First Sight' features the same stuttering disco samples as Stardust's 1998 number-one single 'Music Sounds Better with You'." Michael Hubbard from musicOMH was particularly positive, calling the song "rip-roaring", and said "It would be difficult to pinpoint one duff track on this record, but the more obvious candidates for singles are towards the front of the album – just like her first two records, in fact – especially the rip-roaring frolic that is 'Love at First Sight'." Jason Thompson from PopMatters said the song "opens itself up to the listener with a sexy as hell melody and is one of the sexiest, funkiest classic disco songs that never was... until now." Jacqueline Hodges from BBC Music compared the song to the work of Modjo.

The Abbey Road Sessions version from 2012 received mixed reviews from most critics. Robert Corpsey from Digital Spy said, "'On a Night Like This', 'Love at First Sight' and 'Can't Get You Out of My Head'" are songs that "all of which have been stripped of their shimmer and allowed the lyrics to come to the fore." A reviewer from Virgin Media was positive, saying "'Love at First Sight' becomes a sweet folk rock noodle in the mould of Jack Johnson or Jason Mraz". However, Susana Novas from What Culture said that "Love at First Sight" was a "low point", saying "‘Love at First Sight’, one of Kylie's most iconic singles that gets the Taylor Swift treatment (not a compliment either)." Philip Matusavage from musicOMH commented "Having 25 years of pop classics to draw on means there can be no arguing with the quality of the songs here, however, which is enough to ensure that the album could not be a complete failure. This is clearer nowhere than on the jangly 'Love at First Sight', the euphoric thrill of which shines through despite here rather unfortunately bringing to mind The Lighthouse Family".

=== Accolades and recognition ===
In 2003, "Love at First Sight" was nominated for a Grammy Award for Best Dance Recording at the 45th Annual Grammy Awards. This became Minogue's first Grammy nomination and was consecutively nominated in the same category for "Come into My World", which she won in 2004, "Slow" in 2005 and "I Believe in You" in 2006. Minogue attended the Grammy Awards opening at Staples Centre in Los Angeles on 8 February that year, her only appearance there until 2024. Minogue lost to "Days Go By" by Dirty Vegas. In 2003, "Love at First Sight" and "In Your Eyes" was nominated at the Ivor Novello Awards for "Most Performed Work", but lost to "Just a Little" by Liberty X. In 2009, Pitchfork ranked the song at number 208 in their list of "The Top 500 Tracks of the 2000s". In 2012, Jason Lipshutz from Billboard listed "Love at First Sight" at six on their "Kylie Minogue Primer: The Top 10 Past Hits You Need to Know", stating "Love at First Sight a dance song that's so self-assured that it completely powers down 70 seconds in, lets Minogue's voice float in the ether for two lines, then triumphantly returns, slaking the thirst of its hungry listener."

== Chart performance ==
"Love at First Sight" debuted and peaked at number two on the UK Singles Chart, being stalled from the top spot by Elvis Presley and JXL's remix of "A Little Less Conversation". The single was certified Platinum by the British Phonographic Industry (BPI) for sales and streams of 600,000 units. In Australia, the single peaked at number three on the ARIA Singles Chart. It stayed in the charts for eight weeks and achieved a Platinum certification by the Australian Recording Industry Association (ARIA) for shipments of 70,000 units. In New Zealand, the single debuted at number 45 on the RIANZ Singles Chart and ultimately peaked at number nine. It stayed in the charts for 18 weeks and was certified gold by the Recording Industry Association of New Zealand (RIANZ) for sales of 7,500 units. In the United States, "Love at First Sight" peaked at number 23 on the Billboard Hot 100, which became her third highest-charting single behind her 1988 single "The Loco-Motion" (number three) and her 2001 single "Can't Get You Out of My Head" (number seven). The single also peaked at number one on the Dance Club Play chart and number ten on the Mainstream Top 40 chart. In Canada, the single peaked at number five, and has sold more than 134,000 units, becoming Minogue's second best-selling single in that country according to Nielsen SoundScan.

== Music video ==
Still from the "Love at First Sight" video, showing Minogue and her backup dancers dancing in a digitalized maze

=== Background ===
The accompanying music video for "Love at First Sight" was directed by Johan Renck and was shot on a virtual set in Dublin in May 2002. The video took two days to shoot and required several assistances and stylists to help Minogue and her backup dancers. The making of the video was released on the DVD single of "Love at First Sight", featuring four separate video excerpts and shows footage of Minogue dancing on set of the video. A photo gallery of the set was added on the DVD.

=== Synopsis ===
The video for "Love at First Sight" opens with a view of a sky of geometric shapes moving. It pans down to a staircase that is being digitally added on and has Minogue walking down. As Minogue dances to the song, the camera turns in several directions to show the room layout; the chorus features backup dancers on a top stand. The second verse and chorus features Minogue dancing with different patterns emerging on the walls. From the cut-outs of the walls, geometric buildings are present in the background, showcasing the futuristic city that is similar to the "Can't Get You Out of My Head" video. By the last chorus, it shows a night sky and has all the dancers in the background while Minogue sings the song. The video ends with the dancers huddling around Minogue as it pans to the night sky with different geometric shapes.

== Live performances ==
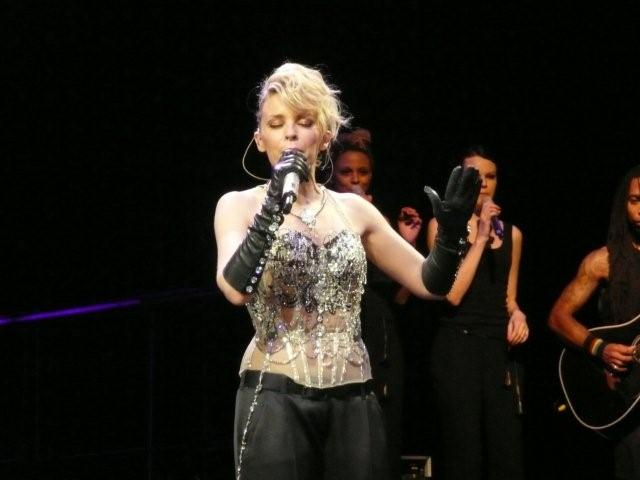
Minogue performing "Love at First Sight" during her KylieX2008 tour

The North American remix of "Love at First Sight" was performed on 17 July 2002 on MTV in the United States. Minogue sported a white crop top with metallic track pants, with her backup dancers present and wearing costumes from the music video. She then performed "Love at First Sight" on The Tonight Show with Jay Leno. Minogue performed the song on several live shows including the iHeartRadio and Jools Holland.

"Love at First Sight" was included in the opening segment of the KylieFever2002 tour, which was launched to promote Fever. In 2003, she performed the song on the one-night only concert Money Can't Buy, which was used to promote Minogue's ninth studio album Body Language (2003), and was held at major entertainment venue Hammersmith Apollo in London. It was used as the encore segment for the tour. In 2005, she performed the song on her Showgirl: The Greatest Hits Tour. Minogue was unable to complete the tour as she was diagnosed with early breast cancer and had to cancel the Australian leg of the tour. After undergoing treatment and recovery, she resumed the concert tour in the form of Showgirl: The Homecoming Tour in 2007 and included "Love at First Sight" on the setlist. In 2008, she performed the song on the KylieX2008 tour, which was launched to promote her tenth studio album X (2007). It was performed as one of the encore songs for the final segment. In 2009, she performed the song on the For You, for Me tour, which was her first concert tour in North America. She performed the song as a mash-up with "Can't Beat the Feeling" during the Aphrodite: Les Folies Tour, which was launched to promote her eleventh studio album Aphrodite (2010). Minogue performed "Love at First Sight" as part of her seven-song set at the closing ceremony of the 2014 Commonwealth Games. The song was used as one of the encore songs for the final segment on her Kiss Me Once Tour and Kylie Summer 2015 Tour.

She also played the song live at her 2019 Glastonbury setlist.

== Formats and track listings ==
- Australian exclusive CD maxi-single
1. "Love at First Sight" – 3:59
2. "Can't Get Blue Monday Out of My Head" – 4:01
3. "Baby" – 3:47
4. "Love at First Sight" (Ruff & Jam Club Mix) – 9:31
5. "Love at First Sight" (Twin Master Plan Mix) – 5:58
6. "Love at First Sight" (The Scumfrog's Beauty and the Beast Vocal Edit) – 4:26
- Australian, European and UK DVD single
1. "Love at First Sight" (Video)
2. "Love at First Sight" (Ruff & Jam Lounge Mix) (Audio)
3. "Making 'Love at First Sight'" (Four Video Excerpts)
- Benelux and French 2-track CD single
1. "Love at First Sight" – 3:59
2. "Can't Get Blue Monday Out of My Head" – 4:01
- UK and European CD maxi-single 1
1. "Love at First Sight" – 3:59
2. "Can't Get Blue Monday Out of My Head" – 4:01
3. "Baby" – 3:47
4. "Love at First Sight" (Video)
- UK and European CD maxi-single 2
1. "Love at First Sight" – 3:59
2. "Love at First Sight" (Ruff & Jam Club Mix) – 9:31
3. "Love at First Sight" (The Scumfrog's Beauty and the Beast Vocal Edit) – 4:26
- UK 12-inch single

A1. "Love at First Sight"
A2. "Love at First Sight" (Kid Creme Vocal Dub)
A3. "Can't Get Blue Monday Out of My Head"
B1. "Love at First Sight" (The Scumfrog's Beauty and the Beast Vocal Mix)
B2. "Love at First Sight" (The Scumfrog's Beauty and the Beast Acapella)

== Personnel ==
Personnel are lifted from the Australian CD single liner notes.

- Lead vocals – Kylie Minogue
- Background vocals – Kylie Minogue, Richard Stannard
- Writing – Kylie Minogue, Richard Stannard, Julian Gallagher, Ash Howes, Martin Harrington
- Producing – Richard Stannard
- Recording and programming – Ash Howes, Alvin Sweeney, Martin Harrington
- Mixing – Ash Howes at Biffco Studios
- Keyboards – Ash Howes, Martin Harrington
- Guitar – Martin Harrington
- Photography – Nick Knight

== Charts ==
=== Weekly charts ===
Weekly chart performance for "Love at First Sight"
Chart (2002)	Peak position
Australia (ARIA)	3
Australian Dance (ARIA)	1
Austria (Ö3 Austria Top 40)	29
Belgium (Ultratop 50 Flanders)	25
Belgium (Ultratop 50 Wallonia)	29
Belgium Dance (Ultratop Flanders)	1
Canada (Nielsen SoundScan)	5
Canada Radio (Nielsen BDS)	8
Canada AC (Nielsen BDS)	26
Canada CHR/Top 40 (Nielsen BDS)	2
Croatia International Airplay (HRT)	7
Czech Republic (IFPI)	7
Denmark (Tracklisten)	6
Europe (Eurochart Hot 100)	6
Finland (Suomen virallinen lista)	18
France (SNEP)	33
Germany (GfK)	16
Greece (IFPI Greece)	1
Hungary (Rádiós Top 40)	11
Hungary (Single Top 40)	6
Ireland (IRMA)	7
Italy (FIMI)	8
Netherlands (Dutch Top 40)	15
Netherlands (Single Top 100)	22
New Zealand (Recorded Music NZ)	9
Poland (Polish Airplay Charts)	6
Quebec (ADISQ)	8
Romania (Romanian Top 100)	3
Scottish Singles Sales (Official Charts)	2
Spain (Promusicae)	7
Sweden (Sverigetopplistan)	36
Switzerland (Schweizer Hitparade)	22
UK Singles (Official Charts)	2
US Billboard Hot 100	23
US Dance Club Songs (Billboard)	1
US Dance Singles Sales (Billboard)	12
US Hot Latin Songs (Billboard)	31
US Pop Airplay (Billboard)	10
US Rhythmic Airplay (Billboard)	36

=== Year-end charts ===
Year-end chart performance for "Love at First Sight"
Chart (2002)	Position
Australia (ARIA)	67
Australian Dance (ARIA)	9
Canada (Nielsen SoundScan)	68
Canada Radio (Nielsen BDS)	63
Ireland (IRMA)	86
New Zealand (RIANZ)	37
Switzerland (Schweizer Hitparade)	95
UK Singles (OCC)	55
UK Airplay (Music Week)	1
US Dance Club Play (Billboard)	5
US Mainstream Top 40 (Billboard)	62

== Certifications ==
Certifications and sales for "Love at First Sight"
Region	Certification	Certified units/sales
Australia (ARIA)	Gold	35,000^{^}
France	—	57,000
New Zealand (RMNZ)	Gold	5,000^{*}
New Zealand (RMNZ) digital	Gold	15,000^{‡}
United Kingdom (BPI)	Platinum	600,000^{‡}
United States	—	134,000
^{*} Sales figures based on certification alone.^{^} Shipments figures based on certification alone.^{‡} Sales+streaming figures based on certification alone.

== Release history ==
Release dates and formats for "Love at First Sight"
Region	Date	Format(s)	Label(s)	Ref.
Australia	3 June 2002	DVD; maxi CD	Festival Mushroom	
United States	3 June 2002	Contemporary hit radio; rhythmic contemporary radio	Capitol	
Germany	10 June 2002	DVD; maxi CD (Note: In Europe, "Love at First Sight" was made available in two maxi CD variants, with one including two remixes alongside the original version, and the other including two B-sides and the song's music video.)	EMI	
United Kingdom	10 June 2002	12-inch vinyl; maxi CD	Parlophone	
France	18 June 2002	Maxi CD	Parlophone	
France	2 July 2002	CD	Parlophone	
France	2 September 2002	12-inch vinyl; CD (limited edition)	Parlophone	
France	9 September 2002	Maxi CD (limited edition)	Parlophone	

== See also ==
- List of number-one dance singles of 2002 (U.S.)
- Love at first sight
