= Money Can't Buy =

2003 one-off concert by Kylie Minogue supporting her album Body Language

- Promotional concert by Kylie Minogue
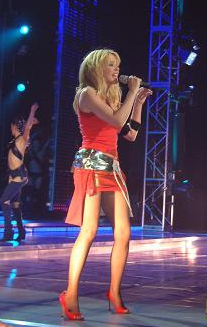
- Minogue performing "Slow" during the show
- Venue: Carling Apollo; London, England
- Associated album: Body Language
- Date: 15 November 2003
- Duration: 75 minutes

Money Can't Buy was a one-off, 75-minute concert show held on 15 November 2003 at the Carling Apollo in London to promote Australian singer Kylie Minogue's ninth studio album Body Language (2003). Its title alludes to the fact that tickets were not for sale and limited to invited guests and competition winners. The total cost of staging the concert was £1 million. William Baker and Alan MacDonald served as creative and art directors, respectively, while Michael Rooney and Steve Anderson worked on the choreography and musical arrangements.

Minogue primarily performed tracks from Body Language during the show, although she previously released singles were also included in the setlist. The concert was streamed live on AOL.com and broadcast on television channels ITV1 and Network Ten a few days later. It was released as a DVD, entitled Body Language Live, on 12 July 2004.

== Background and development ==
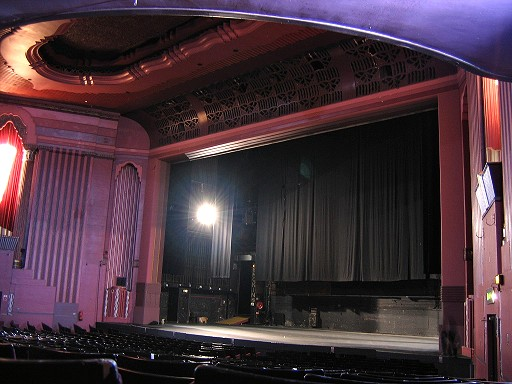
Stage of the Carling Apollo, where Minogue performed

Following the global success of her eighth studio album Fever, Minogue began working on her ninth studio album Body Language. Aiming to create a dance-pop album inspired by electronic music from the 1980s, Minogue enlisted collaborators such as Cathy Dennis, Dan Carey, Emiliana Torrini, Johnny Douglas and Mantronix. To promote Body Language, a one-off concert show was organised to be held at entertainment venue Carling Apollo, London, on 15 November 2003 – two days before the release of the album.

For the show, Minogue collaborated with creative director William Baker and art director Alan MacDonald. Baker and MacDonald had previously worked with the singer on her KylieFever2002 tour. The musical arrangements were handled by Steve Anderson, while the dance routines were choreographed by Michael Rooney. Display hardware manufacturer Barco was hired to provide 100 square metres large LED displays, which were set up on the stage behind Minogue. They were used to show animations and high resolution graphics. Minogue wore five different costumes during the 75-minute-long show. Fashion houses like Balenciaga, Chanel, and Helmut Lang designed these costumes. Minogue was backed by 12 dancers and a full-piece band. The seating capacity of the show was restricted to 4000 spectators and the entire staging of the show cost £1 million.

The concert was entitled "Money Can't Buy" as no tickets were made available for purchase publicly; only competition winners and guests with invitations were allowed to attend the show. Additionally, Minogue donated two tickets to the National Society for the Prevention of Cruelty to Children (NSPCC). These tickets were auctioned at a charity ball for the society's "Full Stop" campaign. The Sydney Morning Herald found it surprising that Minogue chose to perform in an "intimate" setting as she had chiefly embarked on large arena tours in the past. The newspaper felt it was similar to Madonna's decision to perform at a small show at Brixton Academy, London, in 2000. Before the show, Minogue held a media press conference and discussed the development of Money Can't Buy, saying: "It's been pretty intense. I'm trying to look pretty calm but it has been an intense few weeks leading up to this. There's going to be a few old [songs in the set list], but they're not-very-oldies. We're stepping marginally back in time. It's always difficult choosing which songs to play from the new album and then what's going to work. There's a couple of surprises in store and there's a couple of real 'train spotter' surprises."

== Concert synopsis ==
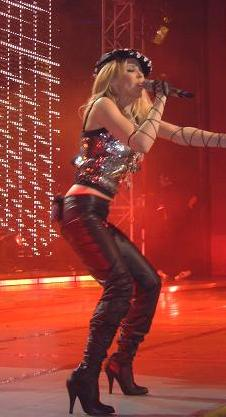
Minogue performing "Love at First Sight", the closing song of the event

The concert was divided into four segments (in chronological order): "Paris By Night", "Bardello", "Electro", and "On Yer Bike." "Paris By Night" opened with the Body Language-track "Still Standing", which Minogue sang from atop an eight-metre long black beam suspended in the air. She continued singing as the beam slowly descended to the stage. The performance of "Still Standing" was followed by "Red Blooded Woman", another track from Body Language, and "On a Night Like This". The latter's performance was inspired by the 1952 musical Singin' in the Rain and featured "dancers spinning iridescent red umbrellas against LCD displays of digital drizzle." During this segment, Minogue donned a Brigitte Bardot-inspired look and was dressed in a black and white striped jersey, black corset and trousers. Images of the Eiffel Tower and Notre Dame de Paris were displayed on the LED screens as backdrops to the segment.

The "Bardello" act commenced with a mashup of Minogue's 1998 single "Breathe" and "Je t'aime... moi non-plus", a 1969 French duet between Serge Gainsbourg and Jane Birkin. Craig MacLean from the Daily Telegraph described the backup dancers during this segment as "Tour de France cyclists moonlighting as Moulin Rouge hostesses." Performances of "After Dark" and "Chocolate", two songs from Body Language, followed.

"Quasi-Japanese symbols", illuminated on the LED displays, served as backdrops for the performance of "Can't Get You Out of My Head", which was the first song of the "Electro" segment. Back-up dancers dressed in bondage-inspired costumes performed "robotic push-ups" as part of the dance routine. Minogue then again performed two Body Language-tracks, "Slow" (the lead single) and "Obsession", before closing the segment with "In Your Eyes".

As the "On Yer Bike" act commenced, Minogue appeared reclining on a motorbike wearing a complete white ensemble. She proceeded to sing "Secret (Take You Home)" and "Spinning Around". After a final costume-change, Minogue closed the set with the "cheery disco stomper" "Love at First Sight".

== Critical reception ==
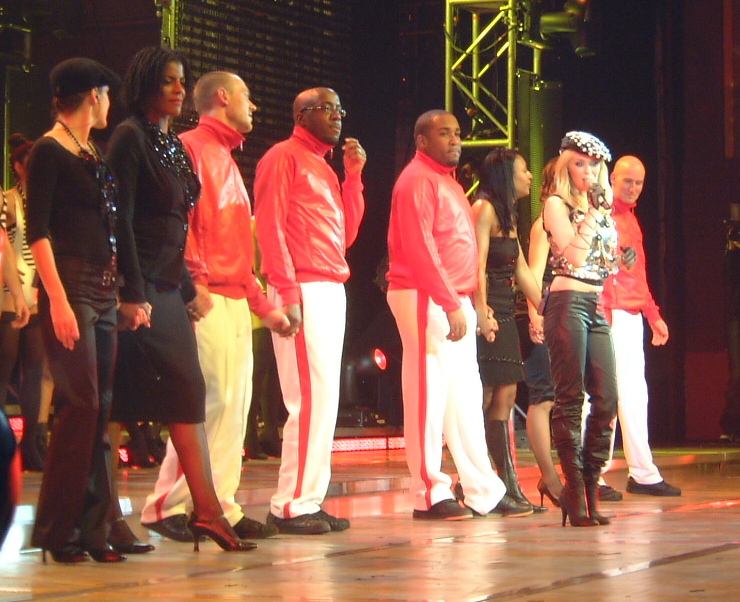
Minogue and her troupe at the end of the show

In their review of the show, The Age commented that Minogue was able to emulate Bardot's appearance well and wrote: "[Minogue] looked the spitting image of Brigitte Bardot as she turned a corner of west London into Paris for the evening." Andy Battaglia from the A.V. Club complimented the staging and performances as "sharp and kinetic", although he also felt that the "little bits of stage banter deflate[d] an aesthetic otherwise set on air-lock." Billboard critic Keith Caulfield praised the concert show as "extravagant" and opined that it should have been a part of a "mammoth" arena tour. Writing for the Sydney Morning Herald, Greg Hassall gave a favourable review of Money Can't Buy and summarised it as "lots of '80s-influenced electro-pop, with a few oldies thrown in for good measure." People magazine complimented the visuals but felt Minogue's vocals were "electronically enhanced." Craig MacLean from the Daily Telegraph called Money Can't Buy a "real tour de force" and noticed that the tracks from Body Language were more low-key than songs from her previous albums, describing them as "sedate and immaculate dancefloor rhythm" and "All very stylish and considerably more affecting than the similarly nostalgic Sophie Ellis-Bextor." Mclean praised the incorporation of the past songs as they provided "the huge choruses for which the nation loves her so", and concluded of the show: "No slinky back-arching or pristine choreography here: just the giddy joy of pop music at play."

== Broadcasts and live recording ==
Body Language Live

Video by Kylie Minogue
- Released: 12 July 2004
- Recorded: 15 November 2003
- Venues: Carling Apollo; London, England
- Genre: Pop
- Length: 110 minutes
- Label: Parlophone
- Director: Russell Thomas
- Producer: Philippa R. Pettett

Kylie Minogue chronology
Greatest Hits: 87–99 (2003)	Body Language Live (2004)	Artist Collection (2004)

The show was streamed live on AOL on 15 November 2003. On 22 November, it was broadcast on ITV1, in the United Kingdom. In Australia, it was aired on Network Ten on 24 November.

The concert show was filmed and released as a DVD, titled Body Language Live: Album Launch Live at the London Apollo, on 12 July 2004 in the United Kingdom. In the United States, the DVD was released on 7 September. In addition to videos of the live performances, the DVD contains behind-the-scenes footage, music videos of "Slow", "Red Blooded Woman", and "Chocolate", screen visuals for the performances of "Chocolate" and "Slow", wallpapers, and a picture gallery.

In Australia, Body Language Live achieved shipments of 15,000 units and was certified platinum by the Australian Recording Industry Association (ARIA). In the United Kingdom, it was certified gold by the British Phonographic Industry (BPI) in March 2005 for completing shipments of 25,000 units. The DVD also charted on the German Albums Chart, peaking at number 64.

=== Track listing ===
Concert Section
No.	Title	Writer(s)	Length
1.	"Still Standing"	Ash Thomas; Alexis Strum; Matt Hay	4:31
2.	"Red Blooded Woman"	Johnny Douglas; Karen Poole	4:10
3.	"On a Night Like This"	Steve Torch; Graham Stack; Mark Taylor; Brian Rawling	4:40
4.	"Breathe" / "Je t'aime"		5:41
5.	"After Dark"	Minogue; Thomas; Poole	5:40
6.	"Chocolate"	Poole; Douglas	5:13
7.	"Can't Get You Out of My Head"	Cathy Dennis; Rob Davis	6:48
8.	"Slow"	Minogue; Dan Carey; Emilíana Torrini	3:30
9.	"Obsession"	Kurtis el Khaleel; David Billing; Mim Grey	3:42
10.	"In Your Eyes"	Minogue; Richard "Biff" Stannard; Julian Gallagher; Ash Howes	3:20
11.	"Secret (Take You Home)"	Reza Safinia; Lisa Greene; Niomi McLean-Daley; Hugh Clarke; Paul George; Gerard Charles; Brian P. George; Curtis T. Bedeau; Lucien J. George	3:26
12.	"Spinning Around"	Ira Shickman; Osborne Bingham; Kara DioGuardi; Paula Abdul	5:12
13.	"Love at First Sight"	Minogue; Stannard; Gallagher; Howes; Martin Harrington	6:34
Total length:			62:27

Extras
No.	Title	Length
14.	"Behind the scenes: Body Language live documentary"	14:21
15.	"Slow" (music video)	3:57
16.	"Red Blooded Woman" (music video)	4:10
17.	"Chocolate" (music video)	4:06
18.	"Photo Gallery"
19.	"ROM section" (weblink, screensavers, desktop wallpaper)
Total length:		26:34

Notes

- In the DVD menu, the tracks are accessible through separate acts according to the actual setlist.
- Each act menu contains an excerpt of a certain song's backdrop, namely: "Red Blooded Woman", "Chocolate", "Slow" and "Spinning Around".

=== Charts ===
Chart performance for Body Language Live in 2004
Chart (2004)	Peak position
Dutch DVDs (DVD Music Top 30)	17
German Albums (Offizielle Top 100)	64
UK DVDs (OCC)	29
UK Music Videos (OCC)	3
UK Videos (OCC)	43

=== Certifications ===
Certifications for Body Language Live
Region	Certification	Certified units/sales
Argentina (CAPIF)	Platinum	8,000^{^}
Australia (ARIA)	Platinum	15,000^{^}
United Kingdom (BPI)	Gold	25,000^{^}
^{^} Shipments figures based on certification alone.

=== Release history ===
Release dates and formats for Body Language Live
Region	Date	Format(s)	Cat. no.	Distributor(s)	Ref(s).
United Kingdom	2004	DVD	5996769	Parlophone	
Japan	1 September 2004	DVD	TOBW-3176	Warner Music Japan	
Australia	2004	DVD	337568	Mushroom	
Thailand	2005	VCD	724359967622	EMI	

== Set list ==
Act 1: Paris By Night

1. "Still Standing"
2. "Red Blooded Woman"
3. "On a Night Like This" (Contains elements of "Singin' in the Rain")

Act 2: Bardello

4. "Breathe" / "Je T'aime"
5. "After Dark"
6. "Chocolate"

Act 3: Electro

7. "Can't Get You Out of My Head"
8. "Slow"
9. "Obsession"
10. "In Your Eyes"

Act 4: On Yer Bike

11. "Secret (Take You Home)"
12. "Spinning Around"

Encore

13. "Love at First Sight"
