= Summer 2015 (Kylie Minogue) =

2015 concert tour by Kylie Minogue

- Continental tour by Kylie Minogue
- Location: Europe
- Start date: 12 June 2015
- End date: 18 July 2015
- No. of shows: 6

Kylie Minogue concert chronology
- Kiss Me Once Tour (2014–15); Summer 2015 (2015); A Kylie Christmas (2015–16)

Summer 2015 was the first festival tour by Australian recording artist Kylie Minogue. The tour comprised six shows in Europe, commencing on 12 June in Aalborg, Denmark and finishing on 18 July in Gräfenhainichen, Germany.

== Background ==
"Summer 2015" was a series of shows present by Kylie during the 2015 summer at the northern hemisphere. Was a reworked version of the previous tour, which included a revamped setlist with new songs, new costumes, and new screen visuals. To announces the tour, Kylie shared the poster on social media platforms including Twitter, Instagram and Facebook days before her first show.

== Synopsis ==
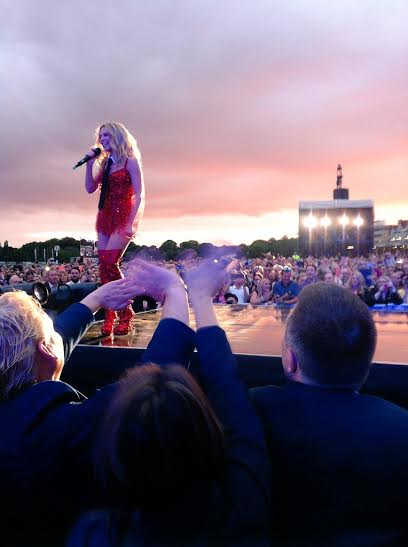
Minogue performing "On a Night Like This" at her gig in Haydock Park

The show began with the video introduction of "Breathe", as used in the Kiss Me Once Tour. Minogue then appears on the same pair of lips from behind the dancers and sings "Better the Devil You Know". After this she goes on to sing "In My Arms" which was followed with a performance of the KylieX2008 and For You, For Me Tour version of "In Your Eyes". Minogue then quickly addressed the audience, and closed the first section with the Kiss Me Once Tour remix of "Wow".

The Bauhaus Disco act commences with the same intro and remix of "Step Back in Time", used at the Kiss Me Once Tour, followed by the same remixes of "Spinning Around", "Your Disco Needs You" and "On a Night Like This", where Minogue wore a red sequined dress with matching boots, along with the collar and tie used for this section in the Kiss Me Once Tour. After this, Minogue went on to perform a cover of Kim Carnes' "Bette Davis Eyes" which was followed with performances of "Can't Get You Out of My Head" and "Slow". Minogue then took requests from the audience before singing the first verse and chorus of "I Should Be So Lucky" accompanied by a live drum beat. At Hyde Park, Minogue invited the audience to sing the whole song while she was carried round the audience on dancers' shoulders, before going on to sing "The Locomotion", and closing the section with "Kids".

The Showgirl 2015 act starts and used the same version of "Get Outta My Way", but has a shortened intro; Minogue wore a gold jumpsuit with matching shoes. Minogue then went on to sing the Kiss Me Once Tour version of "Love at First Sight" before performing her 1992 version of Kool & Gang song "Celebration". Minogue then addressed the audience and closed the main body of the show with "All the Lovers".

Minogue then performed a one-song encore of "Into the Blue" to close the show. This was the only song from Kiss Me Once featured in the set list.

== Critical reception ==
Professional ratings
Review scores
Source	Rating
The Guardian	5/5 stars
The Huffington Post	5/5 stars
The Independent	3/5 stars
Liverpool Echo	4/5 stars

The tour received positive reviews from most critics. Following her show at Haydock Park Racecourse, Tom Belger of the Liverpool Echo gave the show 4 stars, saying it was a "triumphant return to Merseyside". He commented that Minogue's costume "looked a lot like Christmas, but it's hard to blame her for mixing things up on a seemingly endless tour." Ashley Percival of The Huffington Post said that Minogue's Hyde Park show was "the Glastonbury set that never was". He gave the show 5 stars, stating that "Kylie proved that you can't keep a disco diva down" following "a tumultuous few years [...] after signing up to Jay Z's Roc Nation following the split from her manager of 25 years in late 2013". He concluded his review by saying hopefully "Michael Eavis has already been on the blower for a headline slot at Glasto 2016". Caroline Sullivan of The Guardian also gave the same concert 5 stars, saying Minogue and "her set reinforces her status as dancepop's greatest poppet". Pierre Perrone of The Independent was slightly more critical of the concert, giving it 3 stars, stating that "Kylie Minogue didn't quite make the leap to outdoor headliner status".

== Commercial performance ==
All 22,000 tickets for Minogue's performance on 19 June 2015 in Suffolk were sold out in a record-breaking 30 minutes.

== Setlist ==
1. "Video Sequence" (contains elements of "Breathe")
2. "Better the Devil You Know"
3. "In My Arms"
4. "In Your Eyes"
5. "Wow"
6. "Video Sequence"
7. "Step Back in Time"
8. "Spinning Around"
9. "Your Disco Needs You"
10. "On a Night Like This"
11. "Bette Davis Eyes"
12. "Can't Get You Out of My Head"
13. "Slow"
14. "I Should Be So Lucky"
15. "The Locomotion"
16. "Kids"
17. "Get Outta My Way"
18. "Love at First Sight"
19. "Celebration"
20. "All the Lovers"

Encore

21. "Into the Blue"

== Show dates ==
List of 2015 concerts, showing date, city, country and venue
Date	City	Country	Venue
Europe
12 June (Note: The 12 June 2015 concert in Aalborg, Denmark at Skovdalen is a part of Skovrock Festival.)	Aalborg	Denmark	Skovdalen
19 June (Note: The 19 June 2015 concert in Suffolk, England at Newmarket Racecourse is a part of The Jockey Club’s An Evening At The Races concert series.)	Suffolk	England	Newmarket Racecourse
20 June (Note: The 20 June 2015 concert in Merseyside, England at Haydock Park Racecourse is a part of The Jockey Club’s An Evening At The Races concert series.)	Merseyside	England	Haydock Park Racecourse
21 June (Note: The 21 June 2015 concert in London, England at Hyde Park is a part of British Summer Time.)	London	England	Hyde Park
16 July (Note: The 16 July 2015 concert in Pori, Finland at Kirjurinluoto is a part of Pori Jazz Festival.)	Pori	Finland	Kirjurinluoto
18 July (Note: The 18 July 2015 concert in Gräfenhainichen, Germany at Ferropolis is a part of Melt! Festival.)	Gräfenhainichen	Germany	Ferropolis

Cancellations and rescheduled shows

16 June 2015	Istanbul, Turkey	Küçükçiftlik Park	Cancelled
