= Red Blooded Woman =

2004 single by Kylie Minogue

Single by Kylie Minogue

from the album Body Language
- B-side: "Almost a Lover"; "Cruise Control"; "Slow" (remix)
- Released: 1 March 2004
- Studio: El Cortijo (Marbella, Spain)
- Genre: Hip hop; synth-pop; R&B
- Length: 4:21
- Label: Parlophone
- Songwriters: Johnny Douglas; Karen Poole
- Producer: Johnny Douglas

Kylie Minogue singles chronology
"Slow" (2003)	"Red Blooded Woman" (2004)	"Chocolate" (2004)

Music video
- "Red Blooded Woman" on YouTube

"Red Blooded Woman" is a song recorded by Australian singer Kylie Minogue for her ninth studio album, Body Language (2003). Written by Johnny Douglas and Karen Poole and produced by the former, it is a hip hop and synth-pop track containing a vocoded "Boy! Boy!" hook and backing vocals from a choir, and was released by Parlophone as the second single from the album on 1 March 2004.

The song was well received by music critics, many of whom praised its production and compared it to the work of American music artists Justin Timberlake and Timbaland. Commercially, the song peaked within the top five on the singles charts in Australia and the United Kingdom. It also entered the top 10 in several other countries, including Spain and Italy, and charted within the top 20 in Germany and New Zealand. It was certified gold by the Recording Industry Association of New Zealand (RIANZ) for selling over 7,500 units.

The music video for "Red Blooded Woman", directed by Jake Nava, features Minogue seductively dancing in various locations such as a traffic jam and in front of a truck. Minogue performed it live at the one-off concert show Money Can't Buy and at TV shows like the Late Show with David Letterman and Top of the Pops. It has also been performed during three of Minogue's concert tours – Showgirl: The Greatest Hits Tour, Showgirl: The Homecoming Tour, and For You, for Me tour.

== Background and composition ==
Following the global success of her eighth studio album Fever, Minogue began working on her ninth studio album Body Language. Aiming to create a dance-pop album inspired by electronic music from the 1980s, Minogue enlisted collaborators such as Johnny Douglas (who had previously worked with her on Light Years) and Karen Poole. The duo wrote "Red Blooded Woman" together, while Douglas also produced the song. It was selected as the second single from Body Language and was released globally on 1 March 2004.

"Red Blooded Woman" (2003)
A vocoded "Boy! Boy!" hook can be heard throughout the chorus of the hip hop and synthpop-influenced song.

"Red Blooded Woman" is a hip hop, synthpop, and R&B track, the former being a genre Minogue newly experimented with on the album. A vocoded "Boy! Boy!" hook and "candy-coated la la la's" are both repeated during the bridge. A male choir also provides backing vocals in a "ghostly" manner, according to Slant Magazine editor Sal Cinquemani. Like numerous songs from the album, "Red Blooded Woman" references music from the 1980s: its line "You got me spinning round, round, round, round like a record" alludes to British band Dead or Alive's 1985 song "You Spin Me Round (Like a Record)", but also her 2000 hit single "Spinning Around". Remixes by English electronica artists Narcotic Thrust and Whitey were included on the 12-inch picture single.

== Reception ==
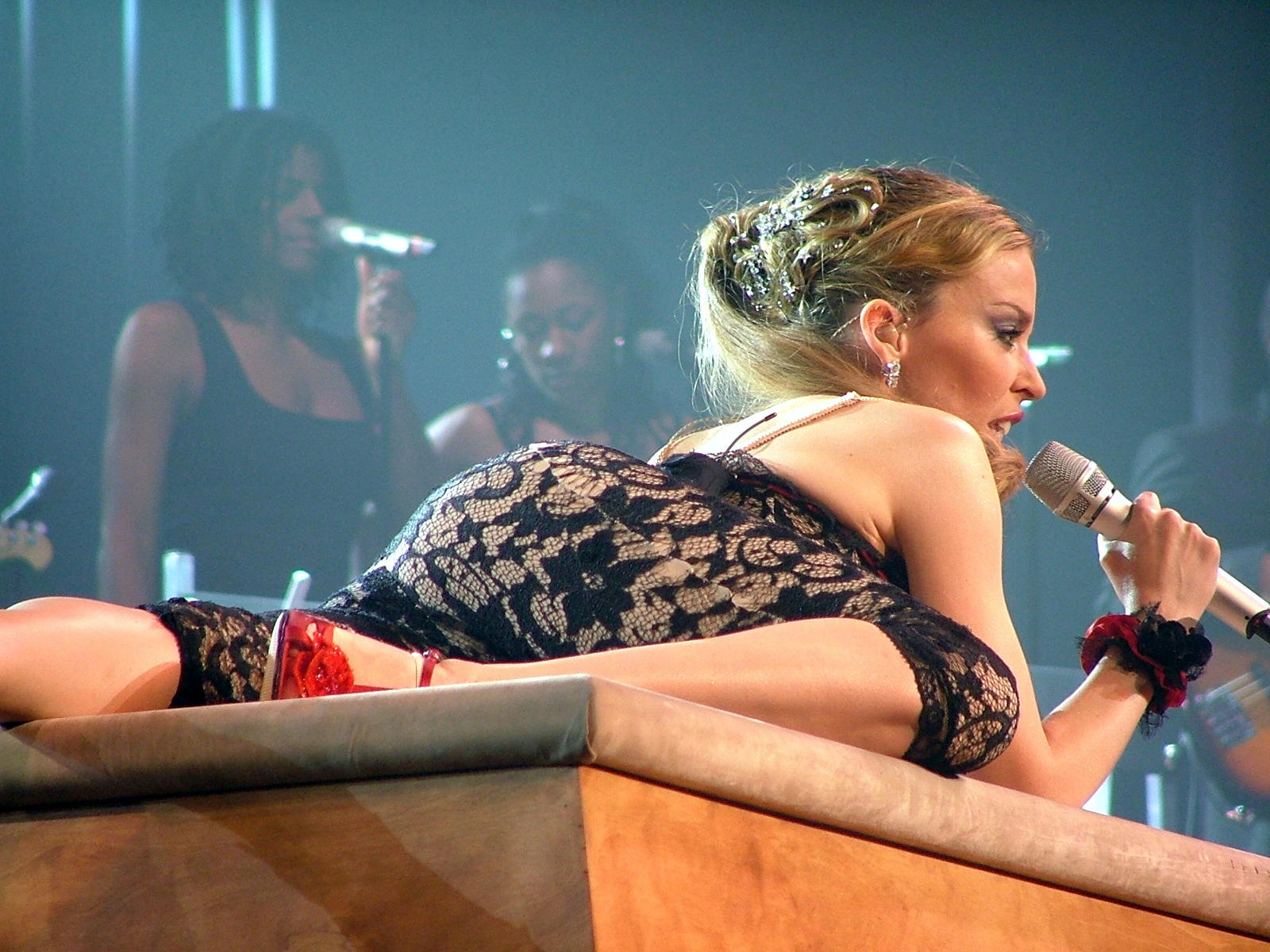
Minogue performing the song during Showgirl: The Greatest Hits Tour (2005)

"Red Blooded Woman" received positive reviews from music critics. Billboard critic Keith Claufield singled out the song as a highlight from the album and called it "a cousin of Justin Timberlake's 'Cry Me a River'." Also from Billboard, Michael Paoletta called it a "sexy, skittery, beat-driven hip-pop number that sounds like a Timbaland production". He concluded that "["Red Blooded Woman"] definitely deserves a shot at mainstream top 40 and rhythmic success". Like Paoletta, Sal Cinquemani from Slant Magazine too compared the production of the song to that of Timbaland. Spin magazine praised the song's "Boy! Boy" hook and synthpop style, feeling that they "demonstrate that even in the 21st century, Kylie wears the 1980s well." Writing for NME, John Robinson found "Red Blooded Woman" to be better than "Slow", the lead single from the album, and called it "excellent cutting edge pop in a great single by the Justin Timberlake or Sugababes way." Adrien Begrand from PopMatters favoured its "almost garage-like beat" and appreciated the lyric "You'll never get to Heaven if you're scared of getting high." Louis Vartel from the LGBT oriented website NewNownext, ranked it at number 46 on his list of the singer's 48 greatest songs, in honour of her 48th birthday. He hailed it a "sweaty dip in self-possession and sex appeal". A reviewer from Sputnikmusic called it "equally as strong as (if not stronger than)" lead single "Slow". More negative was Guillermo Alonso from the Spanish edition of Vanity Fair, who felt that "wanting to sound like Destiny's Child, Justin Timberlake or Timbaland, was not a right move" for the singer.

"Red Blooded Woman" debuted and peaked at number four on the ARIA Singles Chart in Australia. The following week, it dropped out of the top 10 to number 11. The single had a short run on the chart, lasting for five weeks in total. In New Zealand, it entered the singles chart at number 34 and later peaked at number 19. It charted for 12 weeks and was certified gold by the Recording Industry Association of New Zealand (RIANZ) for selling 7,500 units.

In Europe, the song reached the top 20 in numerous countries. In both Denmark and Italy, "Red Blooded Woman" peaked at number 10 and appeared in the top 20 for three weeks. In Germany, the song peaked at number 16 and charted for a total of 10 weeks. It debuted at number eight on the Spanish Singles Chart and fell one place to number nine the next week, overall having a short chart run of four weeks. In Switzerland, "Red Blooded Woman" peaked higher than its preceding single "Slow", reaching number 15 on the Schweizer Hitparade. "Red Blooded Woman" entered the UK Singles Chart at number five, becoming Minogue's 26th top-ten hit in the country. It was a moderate success, charting for nine weeks inside the top 40.

== Music video ==
The music video for "Red Blooded Woman" was directed by English film director Jake Nava, who had previously worked with artists like Beyoncé and Kelis. It was filmed in Los Angeles, California, in December 2003. It begins with a scene of a congested traffic jam in which Minogue is caught. She is shown seated in her car sensually singing along to the song, with the camera repeatedly focusing on her eyes and lips, wearing a black and white singlet, a satin waist cincher, jeans with chain fringes, and a black sheepskin shrug (this outfit was donated by Minogue to the Arts Centre Melbourne and is displayed in the Kylie Minogue Collection). A few seconds later, she gets down from her vehicle and playfully makes her way to a tank. Climbing up on its ladder, Minogue dances seductively to the chorus of the song. She then resumes walking on the street and is accompanied by two doberman puppies who escape from a nearby car. After entering into the backseat of another car, Minogue begins unwrapping a red dress and proceeds to change into it, with various onlookers watching her. As the second chorus starts, Minogue is seen dancing with a group of backup dancers at a different location, wearing a fluorine yellow bustier underneath a pastel pink dress designed by French fashion house Balenciaga. The scene changes back to the street, where Minogue is shown entering a truck. She dims the lights and then dances in a different outfit, consisting of a black bikini, red leggings, and laced gloves. However, she exits the truck in the same red outfit she donned earlier. The rest of the video rapidly intersperses scenes of Minogue dancing inside and in front of the truck, on a car, with the backup dancers, and near a gang of motorcyclists.

== Live performances ==
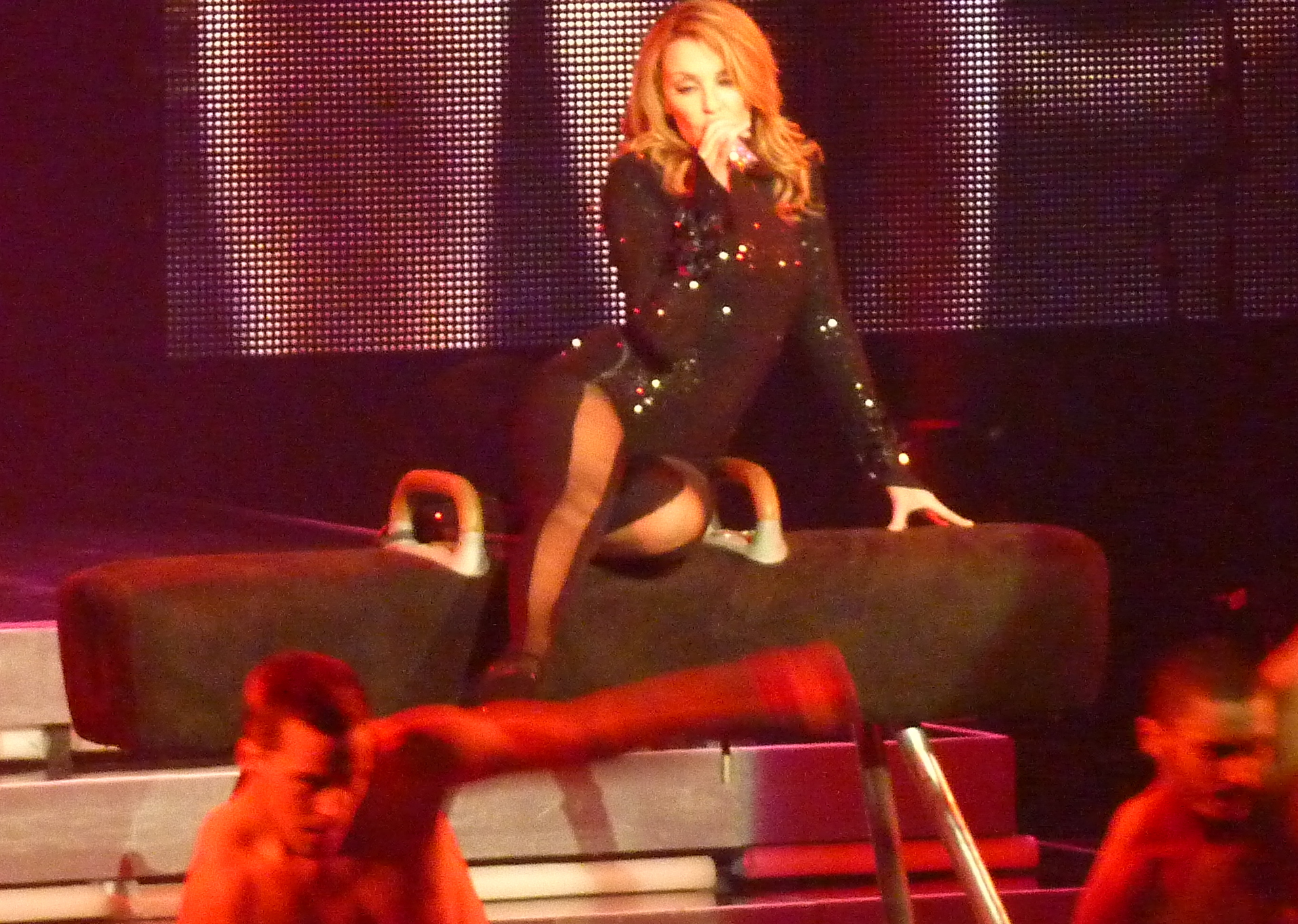
Minogue performing "Red Blooded Woman" during her 2009 North American For You, For Me tour

A one-off concert show, Money Can't Buy, was held at entertainment venue Hammersmith Apollo, London, on 15 November 2003 to promote Body Language. "Red Blooded Woman" was included on the set list of the concert and was performed during the first act "Paris by Night." On 20 February 2004, she appeared on British music chart television programme Top of the Pops to perform the song. Minogue later performed "Red Blooded Woman" at German music awards, ECHO Awards, on 6 March 2004.

"Red Blooded Woman" was included on the set list of Minogue's Showgirl: The Greatest Hits Tour in 2005. Minogue was unable to complete the tour as she was diagnosed with early breast cancer and had to cancel the Australian leg of the tour. After undergoing treatment and recovery, she resumed the concert tour in the form of Showgirl: The Homecoming Tour in 2007, and "Red Blooded Woman" was again added to the set list. In 2009, she performed the song during concert shows of the For You, for Me tour, which was her first tour of North America. The performances of the song during all three of the tours contained an excerpt from "Where the Wild Roses Grow" and were preceded by a segment showing numerous male backup dancers showering. After a gap of 15 years, the song was next performed at Minogue's headlining British Summer Time concert at London's Hyde Park in July 2024, where she was surrounded by male dancers in suits.

== Formats and track listings ==
Australian CD maxi-single

1. "Red Blooded Woman"
2. "Cruise Control" (Kylie Minogue, Karen Poole, Johnny Douglas)
3. "Almost a Lover" (Minogue, Poole, Ash Thomas)
4. "Slow" (Chemical Brothers remix)
5. "Red Blooded Woman" (Whitey mix)
6. "Red Blooded Woman" (video)

UK and European 12-inch picture disc

A1. "Red Blooded Woman" (Whitey mix)
B1. "Slow" (Chemical Brothers remix)
B2. "Red Blooded Woman" (Narcotic Thrust mix)

UK and European CD and digital single

1. "Red Blooded Woman"
2. "Almost a Lover"

UK and European CD maxi-single

1. "Red Blooded Woman"
2. "Cruise Control"
3. "Slow" (Chemical Brothers remix)
4. "Red Blooded Woman" (video and photo gallery)

Digital download (Remixes)

1. "Red Blooded Woman" (Narcotic Thrust mix) – 7:12
2. "Red Blooded Woman" (Whitey mix) – 5:20

== Charts ==
=== Weekly charts ===
2004 weekly chart performance for "Red Blooded Woman"
Chart (2004)	Peak position
Australia (ARIA)	4
Australian Dance (ARIA)	1
Austria (Ö3 Austria Top 40)	23
Belgium (Ultratop 50 Flanders)	29
Belgium (Ultratop 50 Wallonia)	20
Belgium Dance (Ultratop Flanders)	3
CIS Airplay (TopHit)	149
CIS Airplay (TopHit) Narcotic Thrust mix	35
Croatia International Airplay (HRT)	5
Czech Republic (Rádio – Top 100)	38
Denmark (Tracklisten)	10
European Hot 100 Singles (Billboard)	8
Finland (Suomen virallinen lista)	12
France (SNEP)	33
Germany (GfK)	16
Greece (IFPI)	14
Hungary (Rádiós Top 40)	21
Hungary (Dance Top 40)	10
Hungary (Single Top 40)	3
Ireland (IRMA)	9
Italy (FIMI)	10
Netherlands (Dutch Top 40)	16
Netherlands (Single Top 100)	21
New Zealand (Recorded Music NZ)	19
Poland (Polish Airplay Charts)	11
Romania (Romanian Top 100)	1
Russia Airplay (TopHit)	99
Russia Airplay (TopHit) Narcotic Thrust mix	2
Scottish Singles Sales (Official Charts)	4
Spain (Promusicae)	8
Sweden (Sverigetopplistan)	28
Switzerland (Schweizer Hitparade)	15
UK Singles (Official Charts)	5
Ukraine Airplay (TopHit) Narcotic Thrust mix	139
US Dance Club Songs (Billboard)	24
US Dance Airplay (Billboard)	1

2009 weekly chart performance for "Red Blooded Woman"
Chart (2009)	Peak position
Ukraine Airplay (TopHit)	161

=== Year-end charts ===
2004 year-end chart performance for "Red Blooded Woman"
Chart (2004)	Position
Australian Dance (ARIA)	14
CIS Airplay (TopHit) Narcotic Thrust mix	164
Russia Airplay (TopHit) Narcotic Thrust mix	97
Switzerland (Schweizer Hitparade)	84
UK Singles (OCC)	54
US Dance/Mix Show Airplay (Billboard)	10

== Certifications ==
Certifications and sales for "Red Blooded Woman"
Region	Certification	Certified units/sales
France	—	20,125
New Zealand (RMNZ)	Gold	5,000^{*}
^{*} Sales figures based on certification alone.

== Release history ==
Release dates and formats for "Red Blooded Woman"
Region	Date	Format(s)	Label(s)	Ref.
Australia	1 March 2004	Maxi CD	Festival Mushroom	
Germany	1 March 2004	CD; maxi CD	EMI	
United Kingdom	1 March 2004	12-inch vinyl; CD; maxi CD	Parlophone	
United States	8 March 2004	Contemporary hit radio	Capitol	
France	16 March 2004	CD	Capitol	
