= Body Language (Kylie Minogue album) =

2003 album by Kylie Minogue

Studio album by Kylie Minogue
- Released: 10 November 2003
- Recorded: March–August 2003
- Studios: The Toy Factory (London); El Cortijo (Marbella); Biffco (Dublin); Angel (London); Britannia Row (London); Eden (London)
- Genres: Pop; dance-pop; electro-pop
- Length: 47:40
- Labels: Parlophone; Festival Mushroom
- Producers: Baby Ash; Chris Braide; Cathy Dennis; Johnny Douglas; Electric J; Julian Gallagher; Kurtis Mantronik; Karen Poole; Rez; Richard Stannard; Sunnyroads

Kylie Minogue chronology
Greatest Hits (2002)	Body Language (2003)	Greatest Hits: 87–99 (2003)

Singles from Body Language
- 1. "Slow" Released: 3 November 2003; 2. "Red Blooded Woman" Released: 1 March 2004; 3. "Chocolate" Released: 28 June 2004

Body Language is the ninth studio album by Australian singer Kylie Minogue. It was released on 10 November 2003 by Parlophone. Following the commercial success of her eighth studio album Fever (2001), Minogue enlisted a diverse group of writers and producers to aid in creating a new album, including Cathy Dennis, Dan Carey, Emiliana Torrini, Johnny Douglas, and Kurtis Mantronik among others. Influenced by the musical works of the 1980s and artists like Prince and Scritti Politti, Body Language musically differs from Minogue's previous albums, which mainly featured disco-oriented dance-pop tracks, and instead explores genres like synth-pop, electroclash, R&B, and hip hop. Lyrically, the album touches upon themes of flirtation, romance, introspection and heartbreak.

Following its release, Body Language received generally favorable reviews from music critics, many of whom complimented Minogue for experimenting with new genres and the overall production of the album. Some critics, however, opined that many songs lacked catchy material and were not suitable for dancing. Commercially, Body Language peaked at number two on the albums chart of Australia and was certified double-platinum by the Australian Recording Industry Association (ARIA). In the United Kingdom, the album peaked at number six and was certified platinum by the British Phonographic Industry (BPI).

Three singles were released from Body Language. "Slow" was released as the lead single in November 2003 and was a commercial success, peaking at number one on the singles charts of Australia, Denmark, Spain and the United Kingdom. "Red Blooded Woman" was released as the second single and reached the top five in Australia and the United Kingdom. "Chocolate" was released as the final single and peaked inside the top 10 in the United Kingdom. Minogue performed at a one-off concert-show titled "Money Can't Buy", on 15 November 2003 to mark the release of the album. Body Language became notable for displaying another change in Minogue's persona and is cited as an example of her numerous "reinventions". The album sold 1.5 million copies worldwide. It was reissued for the album's twentieth anniversary, on vinyl for the first time ever, on 8 March 2024.

== Background and development ==
"I first got into pop music in '81, I'd say. It was all about Prince, Adam [and] the Ants, that whole New Romantic period. Prior to that, it was the Jackson 5, Donna Summer, and my dad's records – the [Rolling] Stones and Beatles. The influence we used on Body Language was more mid-'80s, specifically Scritti Politti"

— Minogue explained how 1980s music, had influenced her.

In October 2001, Kylie Minogue released her eighth studio album Fever. The disco and Europop-influenced dance-pop album became an international commercial success, debuting at number one on the record charts of Minogue's native Australia and the United Kingdom. It was Minogue's first album to be released in the United States since her second studio album Enjoy Yourself (1989), and became her biggest commercial success in the region after peaking at number three on the Billboard 200 chart. With worldwide sales over six million copies, Fever became Minogue's highest-selling album to date. The success of the album, particularly in the US, was credited to the commercial impact of its lead single "Can't Get You Out of My Head", which reached number one in 40 countries. "Can't Get You Out of My Head" sold over five million copies worldwide, becoming Minogue's highest selling single to date and also one of the best-selling singles of all time.

Soon, Minogue began work on her ninth studio album Body Language. Aiming to create a dance-pop album inspired by electronic music from the 1980s, Minogue enlisted collaborators such as Cathy Dennis, Dan Carey, Emiliana Torrini, Johnny Douglas and Mantronix. Talking further about Scritti Politti, a British post-punk band, Minogue reminisced about her collaboration with the band's frontman Green Gartside, who provides vocals on the track "Someday", saying, "To this day I haven't met him! I left a message on his answering machine, saying, "Hi, it's Kylie! I just wanted to say thanks so much! You sound brilliant!" "After Dark" was co-written by Dennis, who had previously co-written "Can't Get You Out of My Head" for Minogue. Torrini, who co-wrote "Slow", revealed how she was approached for writing the song, saying "It was like I had just accidentally walked into the line of fire with, "Hey! You There! It was all quite surreal. I still think Kylie's people were trying to call Jamelia, and they just got the wrong number. It'd be much more funny if that is how it actually happened". The recording of Body Language took place during the summer of 2003, in London, England; Dublin, Ireland and Marbella, Spain.

== Music and lyrics ==
"Slow" (2003)
A 21-second sample of the album's lead single "Slow", which is a prominent example of the synthpop-influenced production of the album.

Inspired by music from the 1980s, Body Language deviates from Minogue's usual disco-influenced dance-pop style, evident on albums like Light Years (2000) and Fever (2001), and instead explores genres like synthpop, electroclash, club and R&B. In comparison to her previous work, Body Language is a "slower-burning record" and begins with the song "Slow", a "minimal" and simple track which serves as a primary example of the synthpop-styled production of the album. Adrien Begrand from PopMatters compared it to "More More More", the opening track of Fever, saying "In contrast to the pulsating, hi-hat driven dance beat of Fever's "More More More", Body Language gets off to a more understated start". Other synthpop songs on the album include "Still Standing" and "Promises", which make use of "buzzing, low synth lines driving the beats, and chord flourishes that sound straight out of 1984". The former track also displays influences of nu-disco and club music.

Many songs on Body Language are influenced by R&B and hip hop music, two genres Minogue newly experimented with on the album. "Red Blooded Woman" "blends the 1980s sound with an almost garage-like beat" and contains a "Boy! Boy!" hook and "la la la" bridge. Critics felt its production was similar to that by American hip hop and R&B producer Timbaland. Elements of funk are also present and are notably clear on tracks like "Sweet Music" and "I Feel for You". "Secret (Take You Home)" received considerable coverage as it features a "coquettish" rap section delivered by Minogue. Body Language also contains ballads such as the quiet storm-influenced "Chocolate" and "Obsession". Minogue's vocal delivery on the album is mostly seductive and breathy in tone, such as in songs like "Slow" and "Chocolate", although the track "Obsession" features raspy vocals.

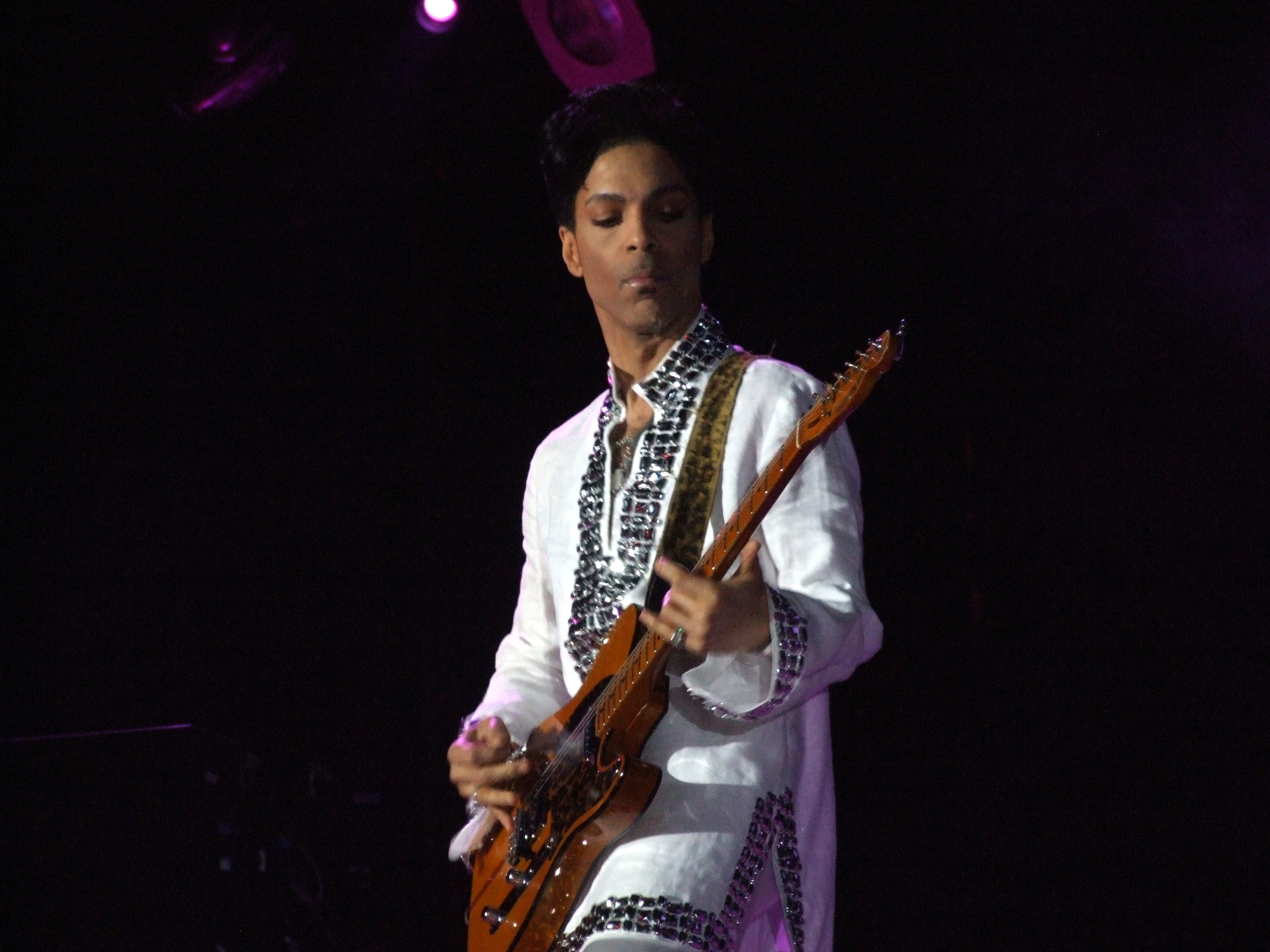
The work of various artists from the 1980s, such as American singer-songwriter Prince (pictured), influenced the development of Body Language.

Critics noted references and similarities to 1980s pop music throughout the album. Adrien Begrand from PopMatters found the hook of "Sweet Music" similar to those in songs by Prince and INXS. "Still Standing" was described by Helen Pidd from The Guardian as "a magnificent blend of Prince's "Kiss" and Peter Gabriel's "Sledgehammer"". "Red Blooded Woman" contains a reference to British band Dead or Alive's 1985 song "You Spin Me Round (Like a Record)", in the line "You got me spinning round, round, round, round like a record". The title of "I Feel for You" is the same as the 1979/1984 song by Prince and Chaka Khan, although it is not a cover of the song. "Secret (Take You Home)" directly refers to urban contemporary band Lisa Lisa and Cult Jam's 1984 song "I Wonder If I Take You Home", both in its title and refrain. The line of the song in which Minogue sings "don't confuse emotions with the pleasure principle" also refers to American recording artist Janet Jackson's 1987 song "The Pleasure Principle".

Lyrically, Body Language touches upon themes like enjoyment, flirting, sex, and "partying like it's 1987 all over again". In an interview with VH1, Minogue was asked why the lyrics on the album "sound more personal than they might have been a few years ago", and she responded by saying "Some of that could be just chance! I wrote lyrics that were intensely personal to me on an album a few years ago. Maybe people know me better now, and therefore, if a songwriter pitches me a song, they might tailor it [to fit me]. I get the lyrics of a tune and interpret them my way". Although the lyrics of "Slow" seem like an invitation to the dance floor, Minogue revealed that "it's about how time and space have a different meaning when you meet someone [you really like]". In "Sweet Music", Minogue sings about the "magic of the modern singer/producer partnership" in lines like "I think we're on to something/Your taste it mirrors mine/So hot and in the moment" and "Let's make this demo right". The song also makes use of double entendre in some lines. Similarly, "Chocolate" is "packed with saccharine innuendo". "Secret (Take You Home)" contains various metaphors that compare flirting and sex to car racing. Ballads like "Obsession" deal with issues of loss and the ending of a relationship.

== Release ==
Body Language was released on 14 November 2003 in Australia, while in the United Kingdom it was released three days later. In the United States, Body Language was released on 10 February 2004. The cover art of the album, as well as other promotion shoots, show Minogue striking a pose in a black and white striped crop top, which reveals her midriff, and black pantyhose, which were worn without shoes. Her appearance is similar to that of French actress and singer Brigitte Bardot. Minogue described the promotion shoots as "the perfect mix of coquette, kitten and rock 'n' roll", and revealed that "We shot it on location in the South of France, so it was [easy to] channel the spirit of [Brigitte] Bardot. She's a great iconic reference, particularly that period where she was working with Serge Gainsbourg". The title of the album was taken from a line from the song "Slow" in which Minogue sings "Read my body language".

=== Singles ===
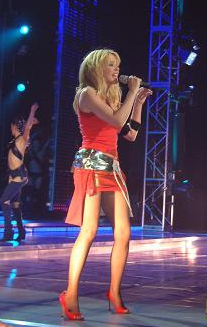
Minogue performing lead single "Slow" during the Money Can't Buy concert

"Slow" was released on 3 November 2003 as the lead single from Body Language. The song garnered critical acclaim, with Minogue's breathy and seductive vocal delivery receiving particular praise. Commercially, the single was a success. It debuted at number one on both the Australian Singles Chart and UK Singles Chart. In the latter region, it became Minogue's seventh number one single and made her a record-holding female artist for spending the longest duration as a UK chart topper. Elsewhere, it reached number one in Denmark, Spain, and on the US Billboard Hot Dance Club Songs chart. In Australia, "Slow" was certified platinum by the ARIA for shipments of 70,000 units. The accompanying music video for "Slow" was directed by Baillie Walsh and was shot in Barcelona, Spain. It features Minogue and a number of beach models performing synchronised choreography to the song while sunbathing next to the Piscina Municipal de Montjuïc swimming pool.

"Red Blooded Woman" was released as the second single on 1 March 2004. Critics praised its radio-friendly sound and lyrical content. The song performed well on charts, peaking at numbers four and five in Australia and the United Kingdom, respectively. An accompanying music video for the song was directed in Los Angeles by Jake Nava, and features Minogue performing dance routines in various locations.

"Chocolate" was released as the third and final single on 28 June 2004. It received positive reviews from critics, some of whom praised its sensual nature and breathy vocals. The song was a moderate commercial success, peaking at number six in the United Kingdom, but narrowly missing the top 10 in Australia. It became Minogue's 27th single to peak inside the top 10 in the UK. Dawn Shadforth, who had previously directed the video for "Can't Get You Out of My Head", collaborated on the music video for "Chocolate", which sees Minogue and a number of backup dancers performing a ballet-like dance routines as a tribute to Metro-Goldwyn-Mayer musicals.

=== Promotion ===
A one-off concert show was held at entertainment venue Hammersmith Apollo, London, on 15 November 2003 to mark the release of Body Language. The show was entitled "Money Can't Buy" as no tickets were publicly made available for sale and only fans with invitations were allowed to attend the concert. The 75-minute-long concert cost one million pounds to set up and display manufacturer Barco was hired to provide LED displays as backdrops to Minogue's performances. The singer wore five different costumes during the show which were designed by fashion houses like Chanel, Balenciaga, and Helmut Lang. The concert was entitled "Money Can't Buy" as no tickets were made available for purchase publicly; only competition winners and guests with invitations were allowed to attend the show. 4000 seats were made available for viewing the show and while most were reserved for invited guests, some tickets were auctioned at a charity ball for the "Full Stop" campaign by the National Society for the Prevention of Cruelty to Children (NSPCC).

The show was directed by Minogue's stylist and friend William Baker, with musical arrangement and choreography being handled by Steve Anderson and Michael Rooney, respectively. The setlist of the concert show was composed primarily of songs from Body Language; other songs were taken from Impossible Princess (1997), Light Years, and Fever. The show was split in four acts: "Paris by Night", "Bardello", "Electro" and "On Yer Bike". "Still Standing" and "Red Blooded Woman" were performed in the first act, "After Dark" and "Chocolate" in the second, "Slow" and "Obsession" in the third, and "Secret (Take You Home)" in the last. The performances were recorded for inclusion in the DVD recording of the event, which was released as Body Language Live on 12 July 2004. The DVD was certified platinum and gold in Australia and the United Kingdom, respectively.

== Critical reception ==
Professional ratings
Aggregate scores
Source	Rating
Metacritic	62/100
Review scores
Source	Rating
AllMusic	4.5/5 stars
E! Online	B+
Entertainment Weekly	B+
The Guardian	3/5 stars
The Irish Times	4/5 stars
NME	7/10
NOW Magazine	3/5 stars
Rolling Stone	3/5 stars
Slant Magazine	3.5/5 stars
Stylus Magazine	B

At Metacritic, which assigns a normalized rating out of 100 to reviews from mainstream critics, Body Language received an average score of 62 based on 17 reviews which indicates "generally favourable reviews". Chris True from AllMusic complimented Minogue for expanding her "horizons" and felt that the album was consistent and worked as a "piece", calling it "stylish without being smarmy, retro without being ironic". He favoured the overall production of the album and praised Minogue for displaying a "sense of class", which he felt was lacking in the work of female artists like Britney Spears, Christina Aguilera, and Madonna; he concluded by labelling Body Language a "near perfect pop record" and "what may well be the best album of her [Minogue's] career". Keith Caulfield from Billboard was also positive in his review and complimented Minogue for selecting a talented creative team, saying, "The sexy, solid set is glued together by danceable beats and Minogue's knack for picking great songs and producers." The Irish Times review of the song called the album a "worthy successor to 2001's smash hit Fever, a supremely danceable collection of electro-pop songs that's clearly in thrall to the 80s" and complimented Minogue's versatile vocal delivery.

Ethan Brown from New York was greatly impressed by opening track "Slow", and commented that most of the songs on the album "mimic its sound, none of the other songs on Body Language comes close to the achievement of "Slow"". Sal Cinquemani from Slant Magazine felt Body Language was a better album than Fever, calling it "less immediate and more experimental, a midway point between the alternative/electronica of 1997's Impossible Princess and Minogue's more mainstream post-millennium work", and praised it for being cohesive. He also complimented Minogue's "willingness to try something new – even if it's within the confines of dance-pop – is what's made her an international sensation 15 years running". Rob Sheffield from Rolling Stone favoured the sensual nature of the album, calling it "fantastic" and that "At thirty-five, she's ten times hotter than she was ten years ago – on Body Language, Kylie Minogue definitely sounds like she has a few more tricks stored on her hard drive than Britney [Spears] or Christina [Aguilera]".

Chris Willman from Entertainment Weekly called it Minogue's "Madonna-meets-Mirwais move" and felt that her exploration of new genres is "ludicrously enjoyable", although he opined that the album was "synthetic" and "all Body [sic] no soul". Helen Pidd from The Guardian favoured the blend of 1980s musical styles on the album, but felt that it lacked danceable songs, saying "Problem is, as with the majority of other tracks – including, most disappointingly, the Dennis-penned "After Dark" – you would be hard pushed to dance to it, which could well be Body Language's downfall". John Robinson from NME gave Body Language an overall positive review and called it "an extremely tastefully done, soulful modern r'n'b record", but felt that it "fails to live up to its predecessor [Fever]". Likewise, Adrien Begnard from PopMatters felt that Body Language lacked the "undeniably catchy" material which was present in Fever, but praised the overall production and the first half of the album; he concluded that "Even though Body Language is a bit of a misstep for Minogue, there's a sense of class to it" and that "Britney [Spears] could learn a thing or two". The Spin review of the album commented that Minogue "wears the '80s well" and praised the dance-oriented songs on the track listing, although they criticised the ballads and pointed out that "[at times] Minogue's vocals are so over-processed that they barely seem to exist at all". On the other hand, Andy Battaglia from The A.V. Club opined that the ballads "work" and concluded that "Body Language shows Minogue as a surprisingly impressive presence in spurts, but she sounds better with her pleasure engine revving at full purr".

== Commercial performance ==
Although Body Language was not as commercially successful as Fever, it was still a success nonetheless. In Minogue's native Australia, Body Language entered and peaked at number two on the albums chart and spent a total of 18 weeks on the chart. The Australian Recording Industry Association (ARIA) certified the album double-platinum for shipping 140,000 units in the country. In the United Kingdom, the album entered and peaked at number six on the UK Albums Chart with first week sales of 68,866 units. It remained inside the top 10 for one week, and for two weeks in the top 20. In total, it stayed on the chart for 30 weeks. Body Language was certified platinum by the British Phonographic Industry (BPI) on 28 November 2003, and had sold 398,035 copies by December 2007.

Elsewhere, Body Language peaked at number 23 on the Austrian Albums Chart and was certified gold by the International Federation of the Phonographic Industry (IFPI) for selling 7,500 units. In the Dutch-speaking Flanders region of Belgium, it peaked at number 10 on the Ultratop chart and spent a total of 17 weeks on the chart. It became Minogue's first album to reach the top 10 in the region. Body Language entered and peaked at number eight on the Swiss Albums Chart, and spent a total of 17 weeks on the chart. In this region, the IFPI certified it gold for selling 20,000 units. In the United States, Body Language debuted at number 42 on the Billboard 200 chart with "meager" first-week sales of 43,000 units. According to Nielsen SoundScan, Body Language had sold 177,000 units in the US as of March 2011. The album sold 1.5 million copies worldwide.

== Legacy ==
If Light Years was the comeback, and Fever the confirmation, then Body Language can best be described as Kylie's "big step forward."

— Chris True, in his review of Body Language at AllMusic

In 2004, Minogue was nominated for "Best Female Artist" at the 18th Annual Australian Recording Industry Association Music Awards and Body Language was nominated for "Best Pop Release". At the 2004 Brit Awards, the singer received her third-consecutive nomination for "Best International Female Solo Artist". At the 47th Grammy Awards ceremony held in the year 2005, lead single "Slow" was nominated for "Best Dance Recording", and in 2012, Minogue picked the song as her all-time favourite song from her 25 years in music.

Following its release, Body Language was considered to be an example of Minogue's constant "reinventions". During this period, Minogue was often referred to as "Bardot Kylie" due to the Brigitte Bardot-inspired look she sported on the cover, and Body Language was seen as a step forward from the "slick, minimalist and postmodern" image she had adopted during the release of Fever. Chris True from AllMusic regarded the album as "another successful attempt [by Minogue] at broadening her sound (with electro and hip-hop for instance) and winning more fans". Later in his review of Minogue's tenth studio album X (2007), he remarked that "By the time of 2004's Body Language, Kylie Minogue was seemingly unassailable, with three hit albums, a number of hit singles, and a recharged career that only a few years before had seemed precarious at best".

In 2006, Larissa Dubecki from The Age commented that "Kylie has beaten her early detractors by inhabiting almost a dozen identities, from the "singing budgie" who emerged from Neighbours to score her first hit single with a cover of the Little Eva classic "Locomotion" in 1987, to the 1960s ingenue of her most recent album, 2003's Body Language". In 2020, Sal Cinquemani from Slant Magazine ranked Body Language as the second best album of Minogue's career. He praised the singer for exploring new genres and presenting a "smooth, sleek, and understated" album, which he described as an "anomaly" in Minogue's discography. Mark Elliott from the website Dig! called it "pleasingly experimental", noting that Body Language has come to be regarded as "one of the most interesting and ultimately rewarding entries among the best Kylie Minogue albums". Similarly, writing for its twentieth anniversary, Quentin Harrison of Albumism opined that it is "one of the subtlest and most creatively defiant vehicles within her canon".

== Track listing ==
Body Language – Standard version
No.	Title	Writer(s)	Producer(s)	Length
1.	"Slow"	Kylie Minogue; Dan Carey; Emilíana Torrini	Sunnyroads	3:13
2.	"Still Standing"	Ash Thomas; Alexis Strum; Matt Hay	Baby Ash	3:40
3.	"Secret (Take You Home)"	Reza Safinia; Lisa Greene; Niomi McLean-Daley; Hugh Clarke; Paul George; Gerard Charles; Brian P. George; Curtis T. Bedeau; Lucien J. George	Rez; Johnny Douglas^{[a]}	3:16
4.	"Promises"	Kurtis el Khaleel; David Billing	Kurtis Mantronik; Douglas^{[a]}	3:17
5.	"Sweet Music"	Minogue; Thomas; Karen Poole	Baby Ash	4:11
6.	"Red Blooded Woman"	Douglas; Poole	Douglas	4:20
7.	"Chocolate"	Poole; Douglas	Douglas	5:00
8.	"Obsession"	Khaleel; Billing; Mim Grey	Mantronik; Douglas^{[a]}	3:31
9.	"I Feel for You"	Jason Piccioni; Liz Winstanley; Stefano Anselmetti	Electric J	4:19
10.	"Someday"	Minogue; Torrini; Thomas	Baby Ash	4:18
11.	"Loving Days"	Minogue; Richard Stannard; Julian Gallagher; Dave Morgan	Stannard; Gallagher	4:26
12.	"After Dark"	Cathy Dennis; Chris Braide	Dennis; Braide	4:09
Total length:				47:40

Body Language – Australian limited edition bonus track
No.	Title	Writer(s)	Producer(s)	Length
13.	"Slo Motion"	Minogue; Frampton; Stent; Wilkins	The Auracle	4:18
Total length:				51:58

Body Language – Japanese edition bonus tracks
No.	Title	Writer(s)	Producer(s)	Length
13.	"You Make Me Feel"	Minogue; TommyD; Felix Howard; Marius de Vries	TommyD	4:18
14.	"Slow Motion"	Minogue; Andrew Frampton; Mark Stent; Wayne Wilkins	The Auracle	4:18
Total length:				56:16

Body Language – North American edition bonus tracks
No.	Title	Writer(s)	Producer(s)	Length
13.	"Cruise Control"	Minogue; Douglas; Poole	Douglas	3:52
14.	"You Make Me Feel"	Minogue; TommyD; Howard; de Vries	TommyD	4:18
15.	"Slow" (music video)			3:55
16.	"Can't Get You Out of My Head" (Live video)

Body Language – North American Target exclusive promo CD
No.	Title	Length
1.	"Can't Get You Out of My Head" (live from Money Can't Buy)	7:02
2.	"Slow" (live from Money Can't Buy)	3:24
3.	"Red Blooded Woman" (live from Money Can't Buy)	4:22
Total length:		14:48

Notes

- ^{^[a]} signifies a vocal and additional producer
- "I Feel for You" features an extract from "It's My House" by S. Buchanan and Earl Buchanan.
- Some digital editions of the album include the radio edit of "Chocolate".
- On Australian limited edition "Slow Motion" is titled "Slo Motion".

== Personnel ==
Credits adapted from the liner notes of Body Language.

=== Musicians ===
- Kylie Minogue – lead vocals, backing vocals
- Ash Thomas – backing vocals, extra chorus "pops" (track 2)
- Alexis Strum – backing vocals (track 2)
- Lion – extra chorus "pops" (track 2)
- David Billing – backing vocals (track 4)
- Miriam Grey – backing vocals (track 4)
- Johnny Douglas – all instruments, backing vocals (tracks 6, 7)
- Dave Clews – keyboards (track 6); programming (tracks 6, 7)
- Karen Poole – backing vocals (tracks 6, 7)
- A Guevara – MC / additional vocals (track 7)
- Green Gartside – additional vocals (track 10)
- Richard "Biff" Stannard – keyboards, backing vocals (track 11)
- Julian Gallagher – keyboards, programming (track 11)
- Dave Morgan – keyboards, guitars (track 11)
- Alvin Sweeney – programming (track 11)
- Simon Hale – string arrangements, conducting (track 11)
- The London Session Orchestra – orchestra (track 11)
- Gavyn Wright – orchestra leader (track 11)
- Chris Braide – all instruments, backing vocals (track 12)
- Cathy Dennis – all instruments, backing vocals (track 12)
- Dave McCracken – programming (track 12)

=== Technical ===
- Sunnyroads – production (track 1)
- Mr. Dan – mixing (track 1)
- Baby Ash – production (tracks 2, 5, 10); mixing (tracks 2, 5, 9, 10); vocal production (track 9)
- Rez – production (track 3)
- Dave Clews – Pro Tools (tracks 3, 6, 7); vocal engineering (tracks 6, 7)
- Johnny Douglas – vocal production, additional production (tracks 3, 4, 8); production, mixing (tracks 6, 7)
- Steve Fitzmaurice – mixing (tracks 3, 4, 8)
- Damon Iddins – mixing assistance (tracks 3, 4, 8)
- Kurtis Mantronik – production (tracks 4, 8)
- Electric J – production (track 9)
- Richard "Biff" Stannard – production (track 11)
- Julian Gallagher – production (track 11)
- Alvin Sweeney – recording, mixing (track 11)
- Niall Alcott – orchestra recording (track 11)
- Cathy Dennis – production (track 12)
- Danton Supple – engineering (track 12)
- Dylan Gallagher – pre-production engineering (track 12)
- Tony Maserati – mixing (track 12)
- Geoff Rice – engineering assistance (track 12)
- Geoff "Peshy" Pesh – mastering

=== Artwork ===
- Tony Hung – sleeve direction, design
- Mert Alas and Marcus Piggott – photography

== Charts ==
=== Weekly charts ===
Chart performance for Body Language in 2003–04
Chart (2003–2004)	Peak position
Australian Albums (ARIA)	2
Australian Dance Albums (ARIA)	1
Austrian Albums (Ö3 Austria)	23
Belgian Albums (Ultratop Flanders)	10
Belgian Albums (Ultratop Wallonia)	33
Danish Albums (Hitlisten)	22
Dutch Albums (Album Top 100)	19
European Albums (Billboard)	9
Finnish Albums (Suomen virallinen lista)	32
French Albums (SNEP)	31
German Albums (Offizielle Top 100)	11
Greek Albums (IFPI)	3
Irish Albums (IRMA)	19
Italian Albums (FIMI)	47
Japanese Albums (Oricon)	43
New Zealand Albums (RMNZ)	23
Norwegian Albums (VG-lista)	21
Polish Albums (ZPAV)	49
Portuguese Albums (AFP)	14
Scottish Albums (Official Charts)	7
Singaporean Albums (RIAS)	9
Spanish Albums (PROMUSICAE)	28
Swedish Albums (Sverigetopplistan)	20
Swiss Albums (Schweizer Hitparade)	8
UK Albums (Official Charts)	6
US Billboard 200	42

Chart performance for Body Language Vinyl Release in 2024
Chart (2024)	Peak position
Australian Vinyl Chart (ARIA)	3
Belgian Albums (Ultratop Flanders)	99
Belgian Albums (Ultratop Wallonia)	46
Croatian International Albums (HDU)	21
German Albums (Offizielle Top 100)	57
Hungarian Physical Albums (MAHASZ)	7
Scottish Albums (Official Charts)	7
Spanish Albums (Promusicae)	45
UK Albums	34
UK Vinyl Albums	3

=== Year-end charts ===
2003 year-end chart performance for Body Language
Chart (2003)	Position
Australian Albums (ARIA)	54
Australian Dance Albums (ARIA)	3
UK Albums (OCC)	63

2004 year-end chart performance for Body Language
Chart (2004)	Position
Australian Albums (ARIA)	85
Australian Dance Albums (ARIA)	6
UK Albums (OCC)	166

== Certifications and sales ==
Certifications and sales for Body Language
Region	Certification	Certified units/sales
Australia (ARIA)	2× Platinum	140,000^{^}
Austria (IFPI Austria)	Gold	15,000^{*}
South Korea	—	8,749
Switzerland (IFPI Switzerland)	Gold	20,000^{^}
United Kingdom (BPI)	Platinum	407,000
United States	—	177,000
Summaries
Worldwide sales as of February 2004	—	1,500,000
^{*} Sales figures based on certification alone.^{^} Shipments figures based on certification alone.

== Release history ==
Release dates and formats for Body Language
Region	Date	Label	Ref.
Japan	10 November 2003	CD, cassette	EMI
Australia	14 November 2003	CD, cassette	Festival Mushroom
Germany	14 November 2003	CD, cassette	EMI
France	17 November 2003	CD, cassette	EMI
United Kingdom	17 November 2003	CD, cassette	Parlophone
United States	10 February 2004	CD, cassette	Capitol
Canada	10 February 2004	CD, cassette	Capitol
Various	8 March 2024	Limited edition 20th anniversary vinyl	Parlophone
