= Piscina Municipal de Montjuïc =

Sports venue in Barcelona, Spain

Coordinates: 41°22′10.02″N 2°9′54.15″E

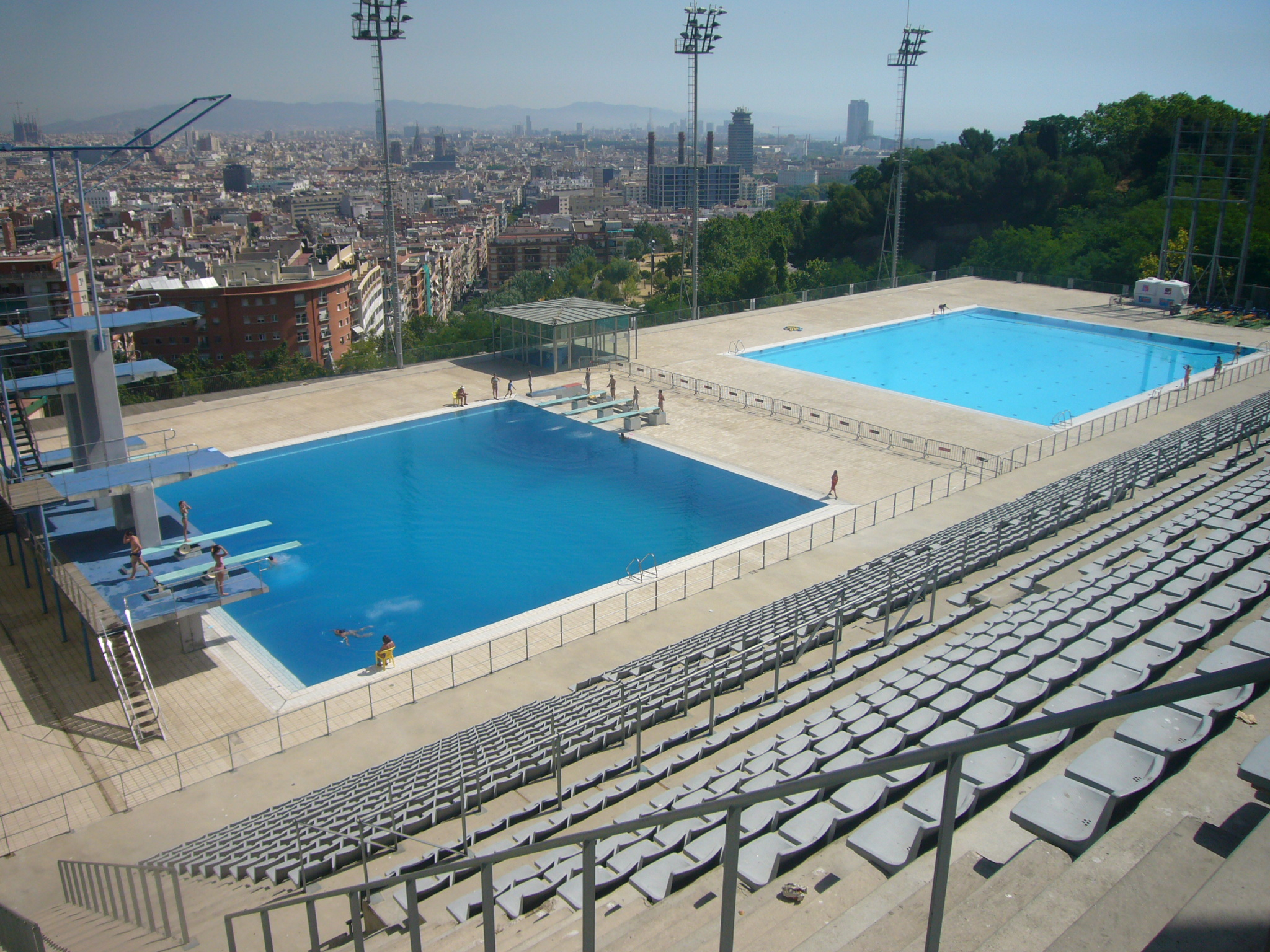
- Interactive map of Piscina Municipal de Montjuïc
- Address: Barcelona, Catalonia, Spain
- Capacity: 4,100

Construction
- Opened: 1929

The Piscina Municipal de Montjuïc (English: Montjuïc Municipal Pool) is a sports venue situated in the Olympic Ring in Barcelona. The venue consists of two swimming pools: a pool for diving and a 25m outdoor pool. It hosted the diving events and the water polo preliminaries for the 1992 Summer Olympics.

The location of the venue on a slope of the Montjuïc hill gives a panoramic view of the city of Barcelona.

The swimming pools are open to the public during the summer.

== History ==
The venue, that used to consist of a single 50m pool, was opened in 1929 and refurbished to host the swimming events for the 1955 Mediterranean Games.

In 1990, refurbishment works began for the 1992 Olympics: the two current pools were built and temporary grandstands were installed, boosting the capacity to 6,500 spectators.

In 2003, the venue hosted the diving events of the 2003 World Aquatics Championships. It played the same role for the 2013 World Aquatics Championships, since the city of Barcelona repeated as hosts.

== In popular culture ==
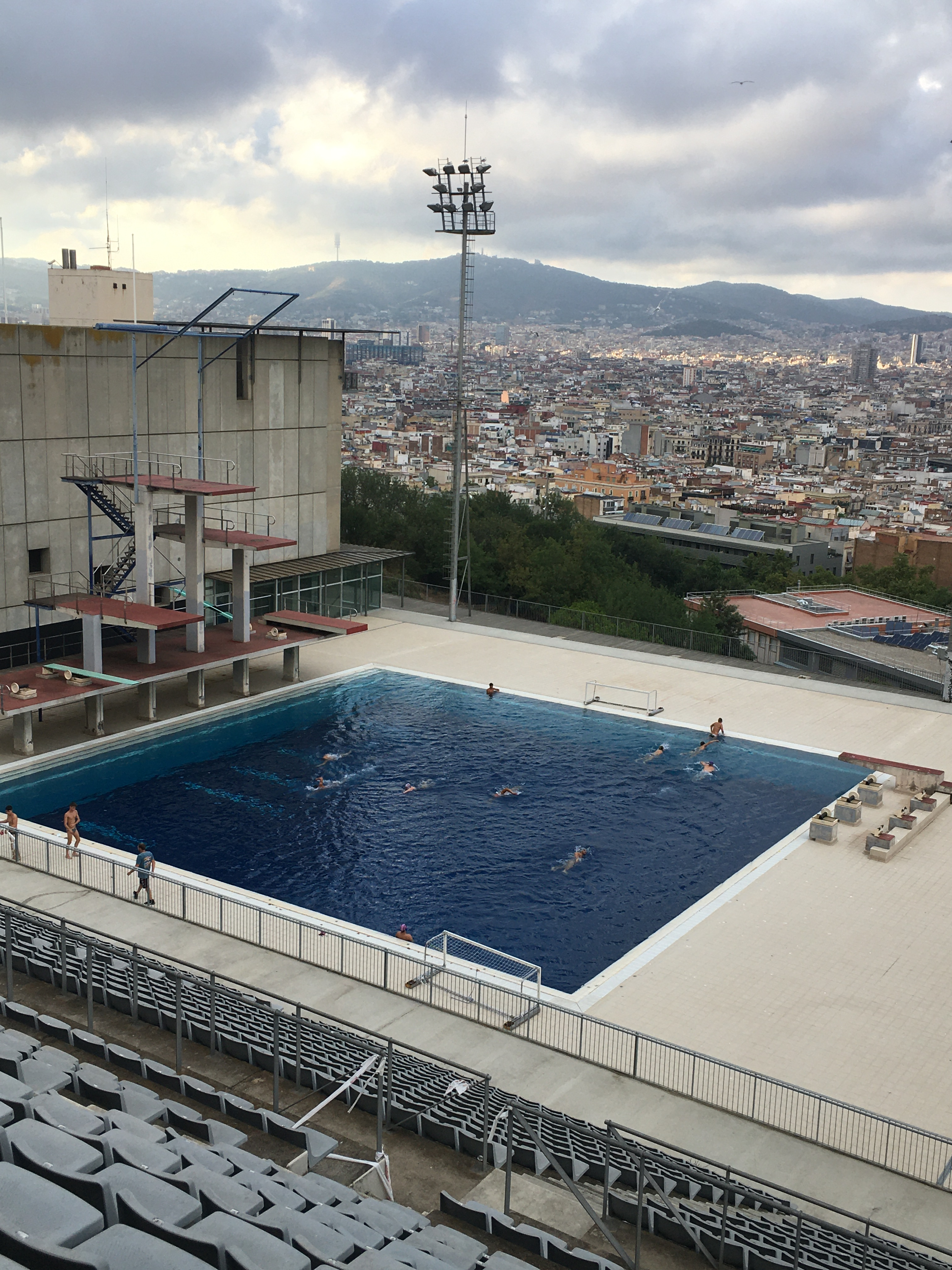
Swimmers doing laps in the diving pool

The music video for Kylie Minogue's 2003 single, "Slow", taken from the album Body Language, was filmed at Piscina Municipal de Montjuïc in August of that year, directed by Baillie Walsh.

In 2016, Apple used Piscina Municipal de Montjuïc for their 'Dive' commercial for the iPhone 7.

In 2018, Erika Lust shot the adult video 'Speedo cleptomaniac' at Piscina Municipal de Montjuïc for XConfessions.

In 2024, Dua Lipa shot a music video at the venue for her single, "Illusion", taken from the album Radical Optimism.

== See also ==
- Piscines Bernat Picornell
