= Slow (Kylie Minogue song) =

2003 single by Kylie Minogue

Single by Kylie Minogue

from the album Body Language
- B-side: "Soul on Fire"; "Sweet Music"
- Released: 31 October 2003
- Recorded: 2003
- Studio: The Toy Factory (London, England); El Cortijo (Marbella, Spain)
- Genre: Electropop; synth-pop; minimal techno; space disco
- Length: 3:15
- Label: Festival Mushroom; Parlophone
- Songwriters: Kylie Minogue; Dan Carey; Emilíana Torrini
- Producers: Dan Carey; Emilíana Torrini; Sunnyroads

Kylie Minogue singles chronology
"Come into My World" (2002)	"Slow" (2003)	"Red Blooded Woman" (2004)

Music video
- "Slow" on YouTube

"Slow" is a song recorded by Australian singer Kylie Minogue for her ninth studio album Body Language (2003). It was written by Minogue, Dan Carey, Emilíana Torrini, and produced by Carey, Torrini, and Sunnyroads. The song is an electropop and synth-pop track on which Minogue invites a man to "slow down" and dance with her. It was released as the lead single from Body Language on 31 October 2003, by Festival Mushroom Records and Parlophone.

Upon its release, "Slow" was acclaimed by music critics, many of whom praised Minogue's sensual and seductive vocals. At the 47th Grammy Awards ceremony, the song received a nomination in the category of "Best Dance Recording". Commercially, the song was a success and peaked at number one on the singles charts in Australia, Denmark, Romania, Spain, and the United Kingdom. The song also reached number one on the Billboard Dance Club Play chart in the United States. In Australia, the song was certified platinum by the Australian Recording Industry Association (ARIA) for sales of 70,000 units.

An accompanying music video for the song was shot in Barcelona, Spain, and features Minogue singing the song while sunbathing next to the Piscina Municipal de Montjuïc swimming pool. Minogue performed the song on a number of television shows and included it on the set lists of all of her subsequent concert tours to date, with the exception of the Anti Tour. In 2012, Minogue named "Slow" as her favourite song from her music career; in 2023, she cited it as a reference point for her album of that year, Tension.

== Background and composition ==
"Slow" (2003)
A 20 second sample of "Slow", containing part of the chorus. Minogue delivers breathy and seductive vocals on the song.

"Slow" was written by Kylie Minogue, Dan Carey, and Emilíana Torrini, and produced by Carey, Torrini, and Sunnyroads. In 2009, Torrini explained how she was approached for writing the song, saying "It was like I had just accidentally walked into the line of fire with, 'Hey! You There!'. It was all quite surreal. I still think Kylie's people were trying to call Jamelia, and they just got the wrong number. It'd be much more funny if that is how it actually happened". Through the lyrics of the song, Minogue urges a man, whom she meets at a club, to "slow down" and dance with her. According to Minogue, the lyrics of the song are about "how time and space have a different meaning when you meet someone". She further said that she "loved the way the song had this push-pull effect; the musical and lyrical combination gives you a sense of that".

Musically, the song is an eighties-inspired electropop and synth-pop track. It utilises a very simple and "minimalist" style of production and was described as an "electro-pop/disco fusion with percolating crackle-and-pop beats and sugary vocal overdubs" by Sal Cinquemani from Slant Magazine. Additionally, it contains elements of electroclash and club music. According to Tom Ewing of Freaky Trigger, the gentle bassline and 'shimmering' backing of "Slow" are derived from the then-popular microhouse genre, comparing it to the music found on the German label Kompakt. Dom Passantino of Stylus Magazine similarly described it as "German minimalist techno" similar to the work of Reinhard Voigt, while Alex Macpherson of The Guardian, in an article of German minimal techno, said "Slow" was "essentially a minimal track with an added pop vocal" and an early instance of the sound achieving mainstream success. Tim Sendra of AllMusic called it a revamp of disco, specifically the subgenre of space disco.

In late 2012, "Slow" was re-recorded by Minogue for inclusion in her orchestral compilation album The Abbey Road Sessions. On the album, Minogue reworked 16 of her past songs with an orchestra, which, according to Nick Levine from BBC Music, "re-imagine them without the disco glitz and vocal effects". "Slow" is approached with a more jazz and trip hop influenced take, with Minogue again delivering sultry and seductive vocals. The song was written in the key of B♭ minor.

== Release and artwork ==
"Slow" was released as the lead single from Minogue's ninth studio album, Body Language, by Festival Mushroom Records in Australia and by Parlophone in Europe on 3 November 2003. The cover art of the single, as well as other promotion shoots related to the album, which was shot by fashion photographers Mert and Marcus, show Minogue striking a pose in a black and white striped crop top, which reveals her midriff, and low-cut pants. Her appearance is similar to that of French icon, actress and singer Brigitte Bardot. Minogue described the promotion shoots as "the perfect mix of coquette, kitten and rock 'n' roll", and revealed that "We shot it on location in the South of France, so it was [easy to] channel the spirit of [Brigitte] Bardot. She's a great iconic reference, particularly that period where she was working with Serge Gainsbourg".

== Critical reception ==
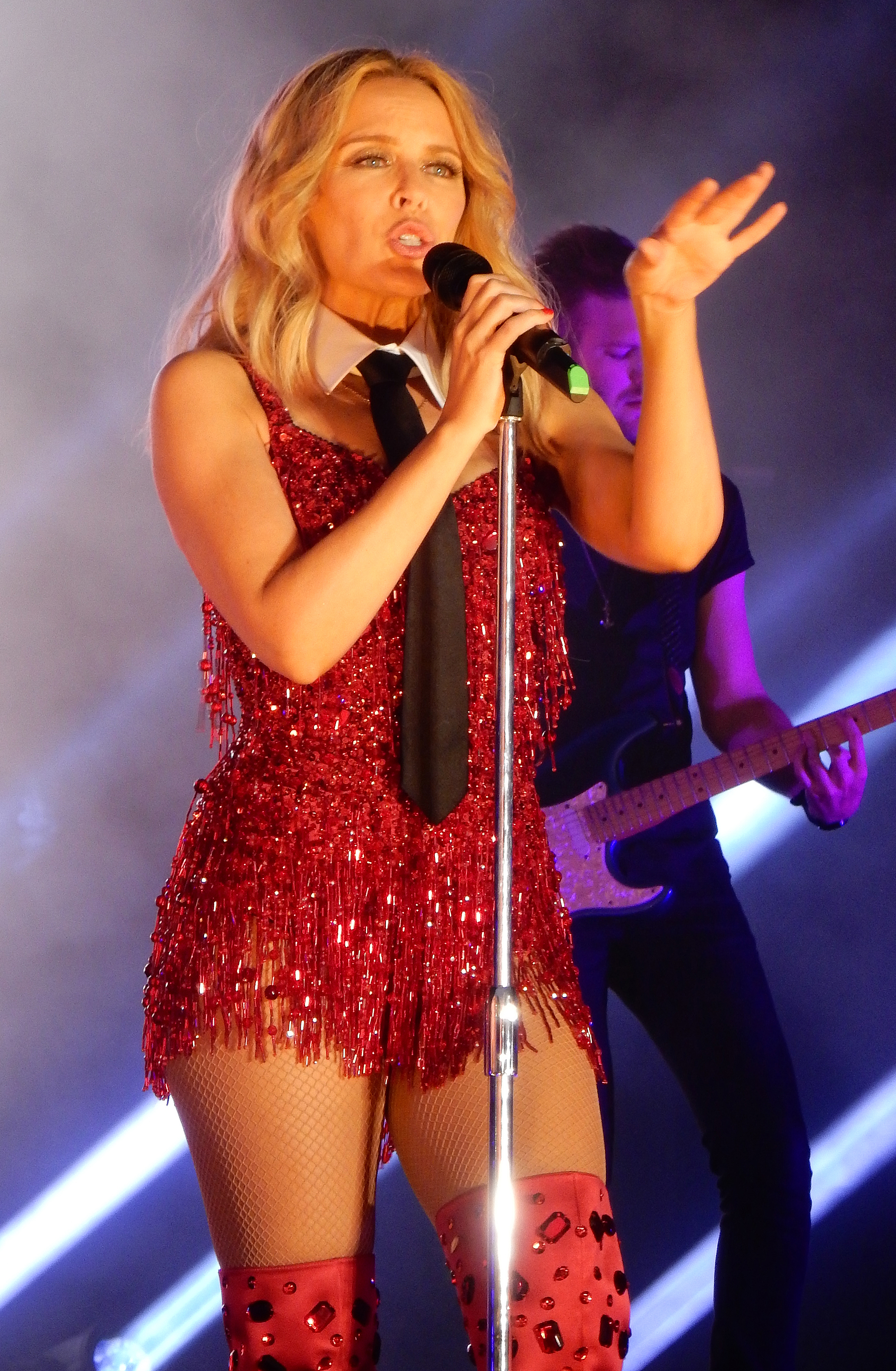
Minogue performing "Slow" during her 2015 summer tour

"Slow" was critically acclaimed by music critics. Ethan Brown from New York praised the production of the song and commented "Everything at the top of the pops should sound as good as Kylie Minogue's "Slow"". He further felt that most of the songs on Body Language "mimic its sound, [though] none of the other songs on Body Language come close to the achievement of "Slow" and concluded that ""Slow" should be a template for pop singers who fancy themselves aesthetes". Adrien Begrand from PopMatters commented that the song was "one of the strongest singles" of Minogue's career, praising her minimalistic approach on the song and its simple arrangement. The Spin magazine review of the song complimented Minogue's vocals, saying that they will "bring all the boys to the yard". Eric Seguy from Stylus Magazine favoured Minogue's demanding vocals, saying that the listener "is open to Kylie’s demands, and willing to resort to any means necessary to impress her". Sal Cinquemani from Slant Magazine felt that the song is one of the "few of the tracks on Body Language approach(ing) the club-thumping zeal of Fever". Chris True from AllMusic picked the song as an album highlight of Body Language. Olive Pometsey from GQ deemed it Minogue's best and most "seductive" track, concluding that "featuring breathy vocals over seductive synths, it's the kind of song that would soundtrack that moment when you accidentally lock eyes with a hot stranger in a club perfectly [...] is indeed a slower track, but don't write it off that reason".

The Abbey Road Sessions' version of the song also generated a favourable response. Tim Sendra from AllMusic enjoyed the "sultry trip-hop take" on the song and picked it as a highlight on the album. Nick Levine from BBC Music felt that "Slow" received the "most startling makeover" on the album, and described it as a "slinky jazz shuffle, complete with vampish vocal performance". Annie Zaleski from The A.V. Club appreciated the song's graceful nature, calling it a "slinky come-on". Philip Matusavage from MusicOMH appreciated the song's jazz influences, noting that it "suggests that Kylie and jazz could make for great things". Jeff Katz from Idolator singled out the song as the "Most Surprising Reworking" on the album. Jude Rogers from The Quietus, however, felt that the song does not "respond well to this (orchestral) treatment".

=== Accolades and recognition ===
Sal Cinquemani from Slant Magazine included "Slow" on his list of "Top 10 Singles & Videos of 2004" at number five, calling it "one of the hottest tracks of the year." At the 2004 Ivor Novello Awards ceremony, "Slow" received a nomination in the categories "Best Contemporary Song" and "International Hit of the Year", but lost the awards to Amy Winehouse's song "Stronger Than Me" and Dido's song "White Flag", respectively. At the 47th Grammy Awards ceremony held in the year 2005, "Slow" was nominated for "Best Dance Recording", but lost to Britney Spears's song "Toxic", which was originally written for Minogue. In order to celebrate Valentine's Day on 14 February 2012, UK copyright collection society and performance rights organisation PRS for Music compiled a list of the top ten "sexy songs" and placed "Slow" on the top of the list. In 2012, Minogue picked "Slow" as her all-time favourite song from her 25 years in music; in 2023, she cited the song as a reference point for her album of that year, Tension. Writing for the Herald Sun, Cameron Adams placed it at number 5 on his list of the singer's best songs in honor of her 50th birthday, calling it "'Can't Get You Out of My Head''s emo cousin – also with a deceptively simple electronic pulse, but taking a much darker tone [...] vocally Kylie moves from detached to carnal in the space of a verse, and somehow ["Slow"] sounds like everything and nothing is happening all at once".

== Commercial performance ==
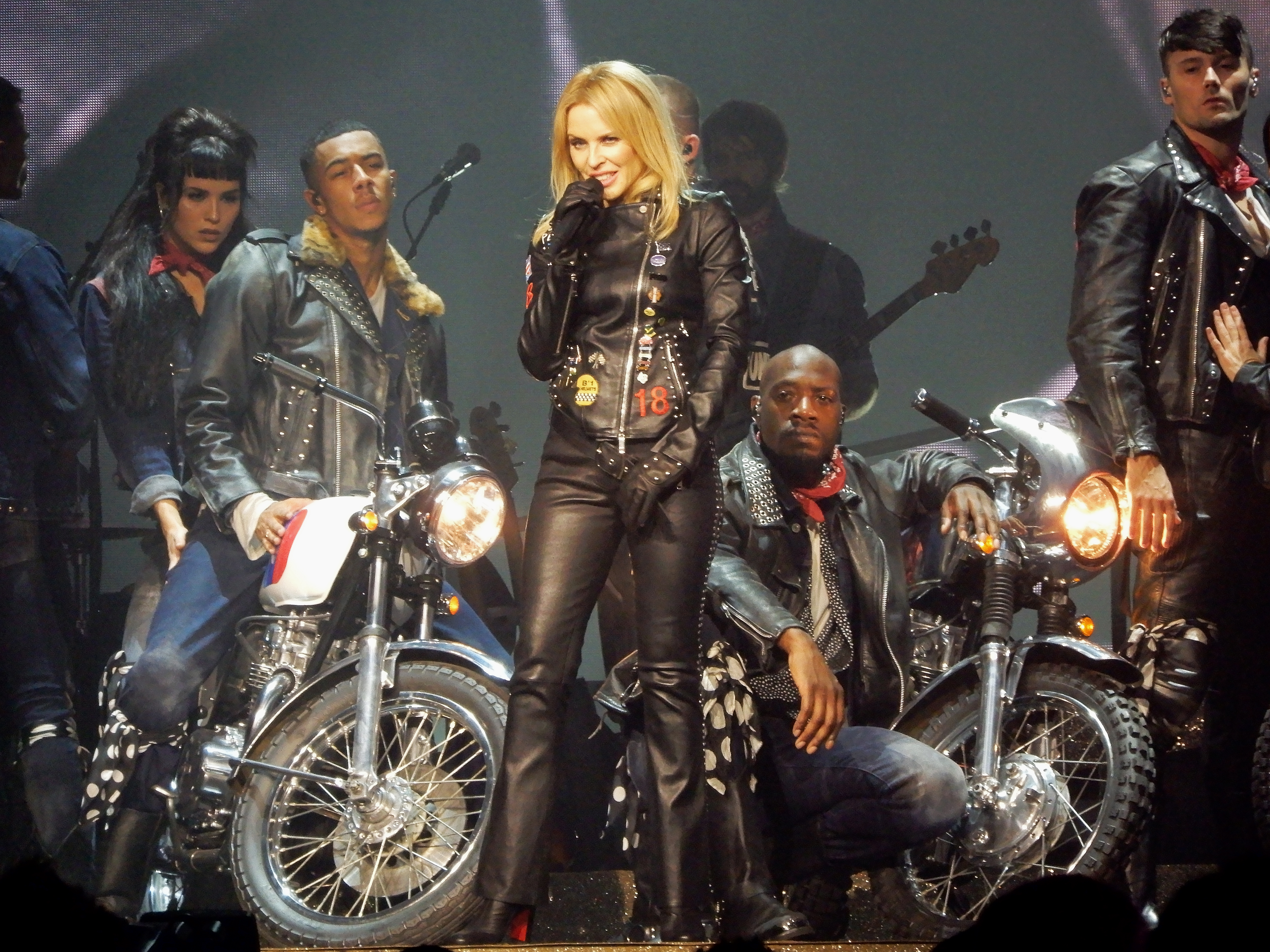
Minogue, flanked by several dancers, performing "Slow" on her Golden Tour (2018−19)

In Minogue's native country Australia, "Slow" entered and peaked at number one on the Australian Singles Chart, marking her ninth number-one hit in the country, and would go on to spend a total of 11 weeks on the chart. In this territory, the song was later certified platinum by the Australian Recording Industry Association for sales of 70,000 units. In Austria, the song entered the Austrian Singles Chart at number 24 and peaked at number 20, spending a total of 13 weeks on the chart. In the Dutch-speaking Flanders region of Belgium, the song entered the Ultratop chart at number 15 and peaked at number nine, spending a total of 10 weeks on the chart. In Canada, the song peaked at number six on the Canadian Singles Chart. In Denmark, the song entered and peaked at number one on the Danish Singles Chart, spending a total of nine weeks on the chart. In France, the song entered and peaked at number 45 on the French Singles Chart, spending a total of 18 weeks on the chart. In Germany, the song peaked at number eight on the German Singles Chart. In Italy, the song entered the Italian Singles Chart at number nine and peaked at number six, spending a total of eight weeks on the chart. In New Zealand, the song entered the New Zealand Singles Chart at number 10 and peaked at number nine, spending a total of six weeks on the chart. "Slow" also debuted at number one in Spain.

In the United Kingdom, the song debuted at number one on the UK Singles Chart with 48,500 copies in its first-week, becoming Minogue's seventh number one single in the region. It earned her a record for being the female artist with the longest span as a UK chart topper. The single remained in the top ten for two weeks and in the top hundred for fifteen weeks, and has since been certified Silver by the British Phonographic Industry for sales equivalent to 200,000 units. In the United States, "Slow" peaked at numbers 91 and one on the Billboard Hot 100 chart and Dance Club Play chart, respectively. It is Minogue's last entry on the Billboard Hot 100 chart, to date.

== Music video ==
A still from the video, showing Minogue wearing a dark blue bodyhugging Balenciaga dress

The accompanying music video for "Slow" was directed by Baillie Walsh and choreographed by Michael Rooney. The video was shot in Barcelona, Spain, and begins with a scene of a man diving into the Piscina Municipal de Montjuïc swimming pool and coming out of its edge, where a number of very lightly beachwear-clad people are sunbathing. Minogue stands out in a series of different zoom central shots lying on a sky-blue towel wearing a dark blue bodyhugging Balenciaga dress. The next scenes of the video capture her singing the song through different camera angles, particularly during the chorus when the camera angle shifts to a "bird's eye" view and show Minogue amid beach models performing synchronised choreography to the dance beats. A reviewer from District MTV commented that the video showed that "synchronised sun bathing is more fun than it sounds". Ben Taylor from Swide Magazine included the video in his list of Minogue's "Best Music Video Moments". Used for promoting the song, the video premiered earlier than the song's release date, on 21 October 2003. Minogue talked about the video, saying:

"The video is set in Barcelona at the Olympic Diving site. I lie down for the whole video, which I thought was a very cunning plan. But then I ended up having to sing directly into the camera when the sun was right next it, so tears were streaming down my face! Videos always have a painful moment. It's either too hot or it's too cold or there's always something. That's part of the fun, I guess"

== Live performances ==
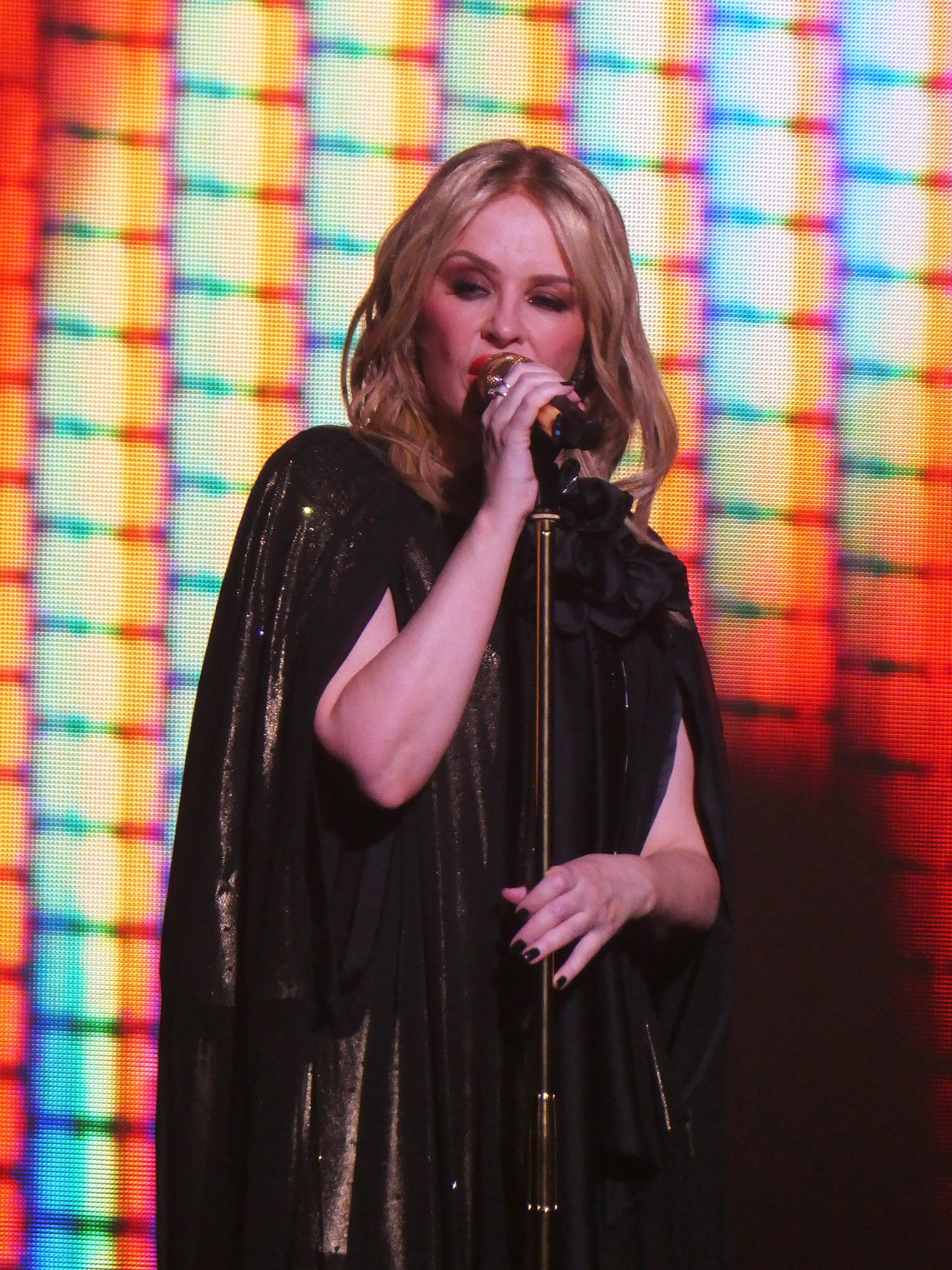
Minogue singing "Slow" on 2025's Tension Tour

Minogue performed "Slow" on 6 November 2003, at the 2003 MTV Europe Music Awards. She later promoted the song on various tv shows, including Benissimo in Switzerland, Quelli che il calcio in Italy and Wetten, dass..? in Germany. Since its release, "Slow" has been featured on all of Minogue's concert tour set lists, with the exception of the Anti Tour. In 2003, she performed the song on the one-night only concert Money Can't Buy, which was used to promote Body Language and was held at major entertainment venue Hammersmith Apollo in London. In 2005, she performed the song on her Showgirl: The Greatest Hits Tour. Minogue was unable to complete the tour as she was diagnosed with early breast cancer and had to cancel the Australian leg of the tour. After undergoing treatment and recovery, she resumed the concert tour in the form of Showgirl: The Homecoming Tour in 2007. In 2008, she performed the song on the KylieX2008 tour, which was launched to promote her tenth studio album X. The show was split in five acts and "Slow" was featured on the fourth act entitled "Xposed".

In 2009, she performed the song on the For You, for Me tour, which was her first concert tour in North America. In 2011, she performed a jazz-oriented version of the song on the Aphrodite: Les Folies Tour, which was launched to promote her eleventh studio album Aphrodite. In 2012, Minogue promoted The Abbey Road Sessions by performing on the BBC Proms in the Park at Hyde Park, London. During the event, she sang the orchestral version of "Slow". In 2014 and 2015, Minogue performed the song during her Kiss Me Once Tour and Kylie Summer 2015 Tour respectly. The performances employed a laser lighting display and featured a "Matrix-style" break-dance routine. For the Golden Tour in 2018–19, Minogue performed a "leather-bar version" of the song; she was dressed in an all-leather ensemble and was surrounded by a group of motorbike-riding men. Writing for news.com.au, Nick Bond felt the performance showcased the singer's ability to "breathe new life into some of her most inescapable hits via canny new arrangements".

A "pulsating" mashup of "Slow" and David Bowie's "Fashion" (1980) was performed during Minogue's 2019 summer tour. She wore a hot red racing driver outfit and was joined by male dancers in pink blazers and kilts. The performance was highlighted by the Evening Standard's Thomas Hobbs as one of the show's best moments. Hobbs also praised the singer for looking "every inch the icon". Minogue repeated the performance during her appearance at The Graham Norton Show in November 2019. A "sexy, languid disco" mashup of "Slow" and Donna Summer's "Love to Love You Baby" (1975) was performed by the singer, who wore a gold 1970s-inspired jumpsuit, on her 2020 live stream concert Infinite Disco. The performance was praised by i's Kate Solomon, who highlighted its "sultry, bassy arrangement". The song's performance on the Tension Tour (2025) incorporated elements of the Chemical Brothers remix, and had Minogue donning a purple minidress underneath a cloak.

== Track listings ==
Australian CD1; UK and European CD2

1. "Slow"
2. "Sweet Music"
3. "Slow" (Medicine 8 remix)
4. "Slow" (video)

Australian CD2

1. "Slow"
2. "Soul on Fire"
3. "Slow" (Radio Slave mix)
4. "Slow" (Synth City remix)

UK and European CD1

1. "Slow"
2. "Soul on Fire"

UK and European 12-inch picture disc

A1. "Slow" (extended mix)
B1. "Slow" (Radio Slave mix)
B2. "Slow" (Medicine 8 remix)

Japanese CD maxi-single

1. "Slow"
2. "Soul on Fire"
3. "Slow" (Medicine 8 remix)
4. "Slow" (Radio Slave mix)
5. "Slow" (Extended mix)

== Charts ==
=== Weekly charts ===
2003–2004 weekly chart performance for "Slow"
Chart	Peak position
Australia (ARIA)	1
Australian Dance (ARIA)	1
Austria (Ö3 Austria Top 40)	20
Belgium (Ultratop 50 Flanders)	9
Belgium (Ultratop 50 Wallonia)	26
Canada (Nielsen SoundScan)	6
CIS Airplay (TopHit)	60
Croatia International Airplay (HRT)	2
Denmark (Tracklisten)	1
European Hot 100 Singles (Billboard)	2
Finland (Suomen virallinen lista)	3
France (SNEP)	45
Germany (GfK)	8
Greece (IFPI)	3
Hungary (Single Top 40)	4
Hungary (Dance Top 40)	27
Ireland (IRMA)	5
Italy (FIMI)	6
Netherlands (Dutch Top 40)	8
Netherlands (Single Top 100)	13
New Zealand (Recorded Music NZ)	9
Norway (VG-lista)	4
Romania (Romanian Top 100)	1
Russia Airplay (TopHit)	48
Spain (Promusicae)	1
Scottish Singles Sales (Official Charts)	1
Sweden (Sverigetopplistan)	16
Switzerland (Schweizer Hitparade)	18
UK Singles (Official Charts)	1
UK Dance (Official Charts)	1
US Billboard Hot 100	91
US Dance Club Songs (Billboard)	1
US Dance Singles Sales (Billboard)	17
US Dance Airplay (Billboard)	7
US Pop Airplay (Billboard)	35

=== Year-end charts ===
2003 year-end chart performance for "Slow"
Chart	Position
Australia (ARIA)	59
Australian Dance (ARIA)	4
CIS (TopHit)	68
Russia Airplay (TopHit)	64
UK Singles (OCC)	74

2004 year-end chart performance for "Slow"
Chart	Position
Australian Dance (ARIA)	20
US Dance Club Play (Billboard)	9
US Dance Radio Airplay (Billboard)	35

== Certifications ==
Certifications and sales for "Slow"
Region	Certification	Certified units/sales
Australia (ARIA)	Platinum	70,000^{^}
France	—	20,404
United Kingdom (BPI)	Silver	200,000^{‡}
United States	—	63,000
^{^} Shipments figures based on certification alone.^{‡} Sales+streaming figures based on certification alone.

== Release history ==
Release dates and formats for "Slow"
Region	Date	Format(s)	Label(s)	Ref.
Germany	31 October 2003	CD	EMI	
Australia	3 November 2003	CD; maxi CD	Festival Mushroom	
Germany	3 November 2003	Maxi CD	EMI	
United Kingdom	3 November 2003	12-inch vinyl; CD; maxi CD	Parlophone	
France	4 November 2003	Maxi CD	Capitol	
Japan	10 November 2003	Maxi CD	Toshiba EMI	
France	2 December 2003	CD	Capitol	
United States	9 December 2003	12-inch vinyl	Capitol	

== See also ==
- List of number-one singles of 2003 (Australia)
- List of Billboard Hot Dance Club Play number ones of 2004
- List of Romanian Top 100 number ones
- List of UK Singles Chart number ones of the 2000s
