= Michael Rooney =

Last surviving son of Mickey Rooney (born 1962)

- Born: Michael Joseph Kyle Rooney; March 30, 1962 (age 63); Santa Monica, California, U.S.
- Occupations: Choreographer, dancer
- Years active: 1996–present
- Parent: Mickey Rooney
- Relatives: Mickey Rooney Jr. (half-brother); Tim Rooney (half-brother)

Michael Joseph Kyle Rooney (born March 30, 1962) is an American dancer and choreographer. He is the last surviving son of actor Mickey Rooney, and is best known for his work on music videos. Rooney has won the MTV Video Music Award for Best Choreography in 1996, 1999, 2001, 2002 and 2008.

== Early life, including mother's murder ==
Michael Rooney was born on March 30, 1962, at Saint John's Health Center in Santa Monica, California. He is the son of Mickey Rooney and the former Barbara Ann Thomason.

In December 1965, when Rooney was not yet four years old, his father filed for divorce after learning his wife was romantically interested in actor Milos Milosevic, but then the couple reconciled. On January 29, 1966, Milosevic shot and killed Barbara Rooney, and then killed himself.

Rooney and his three full-siblings went to live with his maternal grandparents. As a youth he had little contact with his famous father. When he was a young teen his grandmother sat him and his siblings down and explained what happened to their mother. His father later told Michael that his mother was "one of the most wonderful ladies he'd ever met."

== 1980s dance work ==
Rooney started dancing after obtaining a part in his high school's production of West Side Story. He began taking dancing lessons, and his father told him "I can open the door but you have to walk through." His first professional dancing role was in the 1980s series Fame. Other early dancing roles were in War and Remembrance, Annie, Grease 2, Private Eye and Staying Alive. Also in the 1980s he traveled across the United States giving dance workshops.

== Choreography career ==
Rooney became a choreographer who has won MTV Video Music Awards for best choreography for the videos to both Björk's It's Oh So Quiet. and Fatboy Slim's Praise You. He was the co-producer and choreographer for VH1's Hit the Floor for the year 2013. Rooney also choreographed the major dance sequence in the film 500 Days of Summer, starring Joseph Gordon-Levitt. Michael did the choreography for Miley Cyrus and her Younger Now 2017 MTV VMA performance.

His work has included choreographing Michael Jackson's "You Rock My World", Kylie Minogue's "Can't Get You Out of My Head" and Fatboy Slim's "Weapon of Choice". Other music video work has included for Fiona Apple's "Paper Bag", My Chemical Romance's "Helena" and Bon Jovi's "Say It Isn't So". TV work has included for Dancing with the Stars, Any Day Now, Mad About You, Zeke and Luther, Saved by the Bell and the pilot episode of Crazy Ex-Girlfriend, while film work has included 500 Days of Summer. He has done choreography for advertisements, including for Mother's Cookies, Diesel Jeans and Baileys.

In 2011 he choreographed the puppeteers in The Muppets. That was the only film that he and his father both worked on, for Mickey Rooney had a small cameo part in the musical. He also worked on the television film Lovestruck: The Musical.

== Filmography ==
- Annie (1982)
- Grease 2 (1982)
- Staying Alive (1983)
- Infinity (1996)
- I Heart Huckabees (2004)
- Clerks II (2006)
- Red Riding Hood (2006)
- Jackass Number Two (2006)
- An American Carol (2008)
- 500 Days of Summer (2009)
- Shrek Forever After (2010)
- The Muppets (2011)
- A Glimpse Inside the Mind of Charles Swan III (2012)
- Lovestruck: The Musical (2013)
- The Jungle Book (2016)
- Dora and the Lost City of Gold (2019)
- Jackass Forever (2022)

=== Music videos ===
- "Straight Up" by Paula Abdul (1989)
- "Cradle of Love" by Billy Idol (1990)
- "It's Oh So Quiet" by Björk (1995)
- "The Rascal King" by The Mighty Mighty Bosstones (1997)
- "Hitchin' a Ride" by Green Day (1997)
- "Praise You" by Fatboy Slim (1999)
- "Paper Bag" by Fiona Apple (2000)
- "Say It Isn't So" by Bon Jovi (2000)
- "Pop Ya Collar" by Usher (2000)
- "Weapon of Choice" by Fatboy Slim (2001)
- "Hit 'Em Up Style (Oops!)" by Blu Cantrell (2001)
- "Take Me Home" by Sophie Ellis-Bextor (2001)
- "You Rock My World" by Michael Jackson (2001)
- "Can't Get You Out of My Head" by Kylie Minogue (2001)
- "Grown Up" by 2 Skinnee J's (2002)
- "The One You Love" by Paulina Rubio (2002)
- "Life Goes On" by LeAnn Rimes (2002)
- "Misfit" by Amy Studt (2003)
- "I'm Gone" by Dolly Parton (2003)
- "Slow" by Kylie Minogue (2003)
- "Plug It In" by Basement Jaxx (2004)
- "Chocolate" by Kylie Minogue (2004)
- "Accidentally in Love" by Counting Crows (2004)
- "Flawless (Go to the City)" by George Michael (2004)
- "Helena" by My Chemical Romance (2005)
- "O' Sailor" by Fiona Apple (2005)
- "Call Me When You're Sober" by Evanescence (2006)
- "Teenagers" by My Chemical Romance (2007)
- "Run (I'm a Natural Disaster)" by Gnarls Barkley (2008)
- "Last of the American Girls" by Green Day (2010)
- "Obsession" by Sky Ferreira (2010)
- "Different" by Ximena (2011)
- "Gonna Get Over You" by Sara Bareilles (2011)
- "Beekeeper's Daughter" by The All-American Rejects (2012)
- "Nobody but Me" by Michael Bublé (2016)
- "Sweat" by The All-American Rejects (2017)
- "Close Your Eyes" by The All-American Rejects (2017)
- "Younger Now" by Miley Cyrus (2017)
- "Send Her to Heaven" by The All-American Rejects (2019)
