= ColorsxStudios =

German media company

COLORSxSTUDIOS GmbH
- Logo

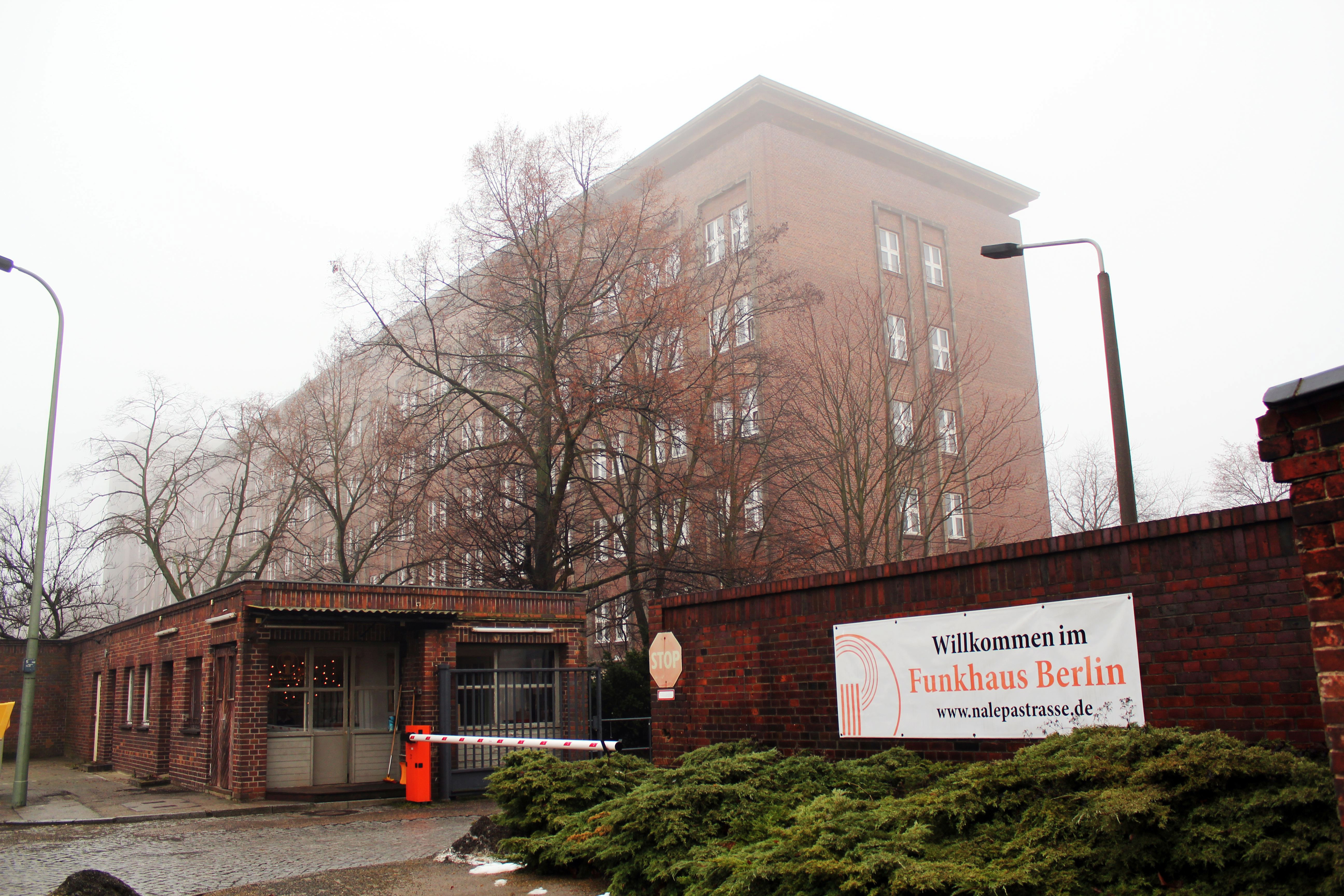
- ColorsxStudios is located within the Funkhaus Nalepastraße, Berlin
- Type: GmbH
- Industry: Music
- Founded: February 2016
- Founders: Philipp Starcke; Felix Glasmeyer; Jonas Weber; Steve LeGrand
- Headquarters: Oranienstrasse 183, 10999, Berlin, Germany
- Area served: Worldwide
- Key people: Brandon Payano (A&R); Jimi Steil (Film Director)

YouTube information
- Channel: COLORS
- Years active: 2016–present
- Genre: Music
- Subscribers: 8.13 million
- Views: 3.43 billion
- Last updated: 8 October 2025
- Website: colorsxstudios.com

ColorsxStudios GmbH (formerly Colors Media UG), commonly known as Colors (stylized in all caps), is a German music performance platform that aims at introducing and showcasing emerging artist talent in the form of videos with minimalist aesthetics. Since its inception in February 2016, their eponymous YouTube channel has amassed over eight million subscribers and over three billion cumulative views. The recognizable peculiarity of their videos is that each band or artist is filmed alone on stage with a neutral background of a particular color.

Having hosted artists such as Brunette, Billie Eilish, Doja Cat, Jorja Smith, Takeoff, Daniel Caesar, Elmiene, Kali Uchis, Mahalia, Angèle and Mac DeMarco, ColorsxStudios is credited with somewhat helping upstage and promote new artists in the music, traditional media and fashion industries. It is also commonly acknowledged alongside Tiny Desk Concerts, Sofar Sounds, Live Lounge and Mahogany Sessions as one of the biggest live music channels on YouTube.

== History ==
In 2016, Philipp Starcke left his advertising job in Hamburg to fully embark on a new project concerning his passion for music and the discovery of new artists. His concept was simply to create quality music videos in a clean style that stands out from the multitude of content on social networks. Starcke believed that this would "connect people, countries and cultures on a creative and emotional level." He then contacted his friend Felix Glasmeyer, who was then a fashion photographer in New York, to present his project to him. Glasmeyer was quickly convinced and then moved to Berlin to help Starcke set up a new studio. At first, it was Starcke's savings that made it possible to rent a small former broadcasting studio located within the Funkhaus Berlin building on Nalepastraße. Without any recording equipment or contact in the music industry, the beginnings of ColorsxStudios were complicated according to its creators. Jonas Weber, an expert in the digital economy, also joined Starcke and Glasmeyer to help develop this concept. The first artist invited to perform on stage was Australian folk singer Emilio Mercuri (Redcoats), who performed his song "Sienna" accompanied only by his acoustic guitar. The video of this recording was posted on February 19, 2016, on YouTube and marks the first episode of a long series titled "A Colors Show".

Initially, the company was officially registered as Colors Media UG by Philipp Starcke on 14 March 2017, but later rebranded as ColorsxStudios GmbH in September 2019, increasing its share capital up from €900 to €25,000 and crediting Felix Glasmeyer and Jonas Weber as co-founders. Apart from earning revenue from advertisements running before videos, ColorsxStudios also used partnerships with brands like Adidas and WeTransfer in 2018. In December 2020, over 200 recordings from ColorsxStudios sessions were made available on streaming platforms, with a comprehensive playlist on Spotify amassing over 200 thousand followers within only one month of creation. On social media platforms other than YouTube, ColorsxStudios has amassed over one million followers on their Instagram page, and over 266 thousand followers on their Facebook page.

== Content ==
The main Colors video series are categorized under the following names:

- A Colors Show: Each installment of the platform's flagship series entails a performance by one or more artists in a minimalist room with floor and walls covered in a single color.
- A Colors Encore: This series usually features another track by an artist who participated in "A Colors Show". More liberties are taken in the making of the videos, in particular with more pronounced shadow play and handheld camera filming.
- New Opera: This more recent series tends to promote a wider range of artistic disciplines and the subjects may have greater social and cultural significance. The first episode invited French singer Yseult to perform three songs, the first two filmed in black and white and the third setting her in a partially flooded room decorated with turquoise fabrics. Emphasis is also placed on the high fashion clothing worn by the artist during their performance.

== Operating model and public image ==
The artistic and committed identity of ColorsxStudios has become increasingly defined since their inception. Their social engagement charter states that their responsibility is to choose artists whose voices and messages are part of an inclusive and culturally diverse structure, whose goal is to build bridges between cultures and artistic disciplines. This diversification of means of expression and this choice to broadcast committed artists are fully in line with the founding principles of the studio, which is now defined as a "musical platform" in the broad sense. In the same vein, ColorsxStudios has launched an online store where they sell a range of products ranging from environmentally responsible clothing to vinyls featuring certain original titles.
