= Kylie Minogue (disambiguation) =

Kylie Minogue (born 1968) is an Australian singer and actress.

Kylie Minogue may also refer to:

- Kylie Minogue (album), her self-titled 1994 studio album
- Impossible Princess, her 1997 album released in some markets as Kylie Minogue
