= Artist Collection (Kylie Minogue album) =

2004 album by Kylie Minogue

Compilation album by Kylie Minogue
- Released: 20 September 2004
- Recorded: 1993–97
- Genre: Pop
- Label: BMG International
- Producer: Steve Anderson; David Seaman; Dave Ball; Ingo Vauk; Jimmy Harry; Dave Eringa

Kylie Minogue chronology
Greatest Hits: 87–99 (2003)	Artist Collection (2004)	Ultimate Kylie (2004)

Kylie Minogue video chronology
Body Language Live (2003)	Artist Collection (2004)	Ultimate Kylie (2004)

Artist Collection is a compilation album by Australian dance–pop singer Kylie Minogue. It was released by BMG International on 20 September 2004 in the United Kingdom. The album contained songs from Minogue's two Deconstruction Records album's Kylie Minogue (1994) and Impossible Princess (1997), as well as rare songs and B-sides. It was also released as a DVD.

== Track listing ==
No.	Title	Writer(s)	Producer(s)	Length
1.	"Confide in Me" (Master mix, from Kylie Minogue, 1994)	Steve Anderson; Dave Seaman; Owain Barton	Brothers in Rhythm	5:51
2.	"Limbo" (from Impossible Princess, 1997)	Minogue; Dave Ball; Ingo Vauk	Ball; Vauk	4:06
3.	"Breathe" (Radio edit, from Impossible Princess, 1997)	Minogue; Ball; Vauk	Ball; Vauk	3:39
4.	"Automatic Love" (from Kylie Minogue, 1994)	Minogue; Inga Humpe; Charlie Mallozzi; Marco Sabiu	Brothers in Rhythm	4:46
5.	"Dangerous Overture" (From the Kylie Minogue sessions)	Anderson; Seaman	Brothers in Rhythm	1:20
6.	"Too Far" (from Impossible Princess, 1997)	Minogue	Brothers in Rhythm	4:43
7.	"Dangerous Game" (from Kylie Minogue, 1994)	Anderson; Seaman	Brothers in Rhythm	5:30
8.	"Put Yourself in My Place" (from Kylie Minogue, 1994)	Jimmy Harry	Harry	4:54
9.	"Did It Again" (Radio mix, from Impossible Princess, 1997)	Minogue; Anderson; Dave Seaman	Brothers in Rhythm	4:15
10.	"Take Me with You" (from Hits+, 2000)	Minogue; Anderson	Brothers in Rhythm	9:10
11.	"Love Takes Over Me" (From the Impossible Princess sessions)	Minogue; Anderson; Seaman	Brothers in Rhythm	4:19
12.	"Where Is the Feeling?" (Acoustic version; Original version from Kylie Minogue, 1994)	Wilf Smarties; Jayn Hannah	Brothers in Rhythm	4:51
13.	"Cowboy Style" (from Impossible Princess, 1997)	Minogue; Anderson; Seaman	Brothers in Rhythm	4:44
14.	"Dreams" (from Impossible Princess, 1997)	Minogue; Anderson; Seaman	Brothers in Rhythm	3:44

DVD
No.	Title	Length
1.	"Where Is the Feeling?" (Music video)
2.	"Confide in Me" (Music video)
3.	"Put Yourself in My Place" (Music video)
4.	"Did It Again" (Music video)
5.	"Some Kind of Bliss" (Music video)
6.	"Breathe" (Music video)
