= Where Is the Feeling? =

1994 single by Kylie Minogue

Single by Kylie Minogue

from the album Kylie Minogue
- B-side: "Confide in Me"
- Released: 21 September 1994
- Studio: Sarm West (London, England)
- Genre: Handbag house (original): Ambient house (remix)
- Length: 4:14 (BIR Dolphin mix); 6:59 (album version); 4:48 (BIR Bish Bosh mix)
- Label: Mushroom; Deconstruction
- Songwriters: Wilf Smarties; Jayn Hanna
- Producer: Brothers in Rhythm

Kylie Minogue singles chronology
"Confide in Me" (1994)	"Where Is the Feeling?" (1994)	"Put Yourself in My Place" (1994)

Music video
- "Where Is the Feeling?" on YouTube

"Where Is the Feeling?" is a song by Australian singer-songwriter Kylie Minogue from her fifth studio album, Kylie Minogue (1994). The song was written by Wilf Smarties and Jayn Hanna, while production was handled by Brothers in Rhythm. In Japan, it was released on 21 September 1994 as the album's lead single, while in the United Kingdom, it was released on 10 July 1995 as the third and final single from the album, eight months after the release of the second single, "Put Yourself in My Place". A new version of "Where Is the Feeling?" was recorded for the single release, featuring spoken word by Minogue.

The album version of "Where Is the Feeling?" received positive reviews from music critics; the single version was also praised by them. Commercially, the song attained moderate success, peaking at number 16 in the United Kingdom and number 31 in Australia. The song's accompanying music video was directed by Keir McFarlane, and filmed in a school swimming pool in Los Angeles; it saw Minogue being pursued through the water by an ominous figure. "Where Is the Feeling?" was later included on the setlist of Minogue's KylieFever2002 tour, and added to three of her greatest hits albums.

== Background and composition ==
Originally, "Where Is the Feeling?" was recorded by the group Within a Dream in 1993. While working on Minogue's self-titled fifth studio album, it was asked if anyone had ideas for a cover song. Dave Seaman, a member of British duo Brothers in Rhythm and producer of the song, felt it was a "perfect fit" for the record. Frankie Knuckles and David Morales' works influenced the duo when they produced the track, adding live piano, guitar and percussion to the song, making it a "classic extended version". An acoustic version of "Where Is the Feeling?" was also produced for an acoustic EP at the time, but was never released; it later appeared on the expanded edition of Kylie Minogue, released in 2003.

"Where Is the Feeling?" was first released in Japan through Deconstruction Records on 21 September 1994, serving as the album's lead single there instead of "Confide in Me", which was not released in Japan. Worldwide, it initially planned to be released as the second single from Kylie Minogue, but "Put Yourself in My Place" was selected instead. The song was then scheduled for a March 1995 release, but was delayed while Minogue completed filming Bio-Dome (1996) in the United States. It was released in the United Kingdom on 10 July 1995 as the third and final single from the album by Deconstruction, eight months after the release of the second single. It features a re-recorded version remixed by Brothers in Rhythm. In Australia, the single was released through Mushroom Records on 14 August 1995.

The album version of "Where Is the Feeling?" was written by Wilf Smarties and Jayn Hanna, and produced by Brothers in Rhythm. It was recorded and mixed by Paul Wright and Niall Flynn at Sarm West Studios in London. Musically, the song is described as a handbag house song with elements of disco and acid jazz. Quentin Harrison of Blogcritics noted its "classic disco feel echoed British acts like The Brand New Heavies, Jamiroquai and Incognito". The remixed version for the single release was described by reviewers as an ambient song with elements of trip hop, featuring spoken vocals by Minogue, as well as the use of an orchestra. According to Herald Express' Gareth George, in the remix Minogue utters "breathlessly whispering sexy come-ons over a pleasant enough ambient groove." It also received new lyrics: "Detached and vulnerable / The world on my shoulders...If only I could laugh in the face of irony / Safe in the knowledge of our eternal love".

== Reception ==
=== Critical response ===
Both the album and remix versions of "Where Is the Feeling?" received positive reviews from music critics. Whilst reviewing Kylie Minogue, Caroline Sullivan from The Guardian wrote that "the best moments are uncomplicated 'handbag-house' opuses", like "Falling" and "Where Is the Feeling?". Larry Flick of Billboard magazine described the album version as a "swirling, disco-minded jam", and complimented the "sprawling, cinematic epic rife with lush ambient texture and seductive vocal vamping" single release, labeling it as "truly brilliant". In his weekly UK chart commentary in Dotmusic, James Masterton viewed the remix as "another surprisingly sophisticated dance record". Alan Jones from Music Week stated that the single version was "very much a first cousin of Madonna's "Justify My Love", but less commercial." Simon Williams from NME viewed it as "a handbag-a-go-go romp which is so banal, so numblingly nothing that even la Kylie herself sounds stultifyingly bored." Another NME editor, Dele Fadele, wrote, "Brothers in Rhythm provide a modern, pop-dance backing, with lovely strings, whilst Kylie breathlessly whispers to some absent lover, but you might as well listen to The Nine O'Clock News if you want a flicker of emotion, something non-robotic, and something to affirm that you're alive." Record Collector said it pairs "Minogue's feel-good, chart-friendly pop with a wash of disco-fied techno". Pete Stanton from Smash Hits named it "a classic soulful Dina Carroll type song", while Birmingham Evening Mail staff deemed the remix as "soulful", and stated that it would "suit Dina Carroll down to the ground."

Herald Express' Gareth George felt the single version was "not that bad" and commented that "if this was the sort of pillow-talk bed-hopping Aussie rocker Michael Hutchence enjoyed its a wonder he ever gave her the boot." Classic Pop staff described the album version as "a clash between happy house and SAW’s squeaky-clean convivial pop", while deeming the remixed version as a "hushed, bleepy jam unlike anything she’d put out". Writing for the Herald Sun, Cameron Adams called the original form "one of the deepest house cuts" on the album, as well as an "absolute belter"; he also described the single version as a "sensual epic that was completely re-recorded from the original". According to Guillermo Alonso, from the Spanish edition of Vanity Fair, the album version sounded "too pop, too conventional, too much of what she had left behind", referring to her past bubblegum pop songs; he found the remix version "almost unregonizable" from its original form, as well as "a very interesting and dark house theme with trip hop influences". Josh Martin from MTV Australia classified the track as a "quiet landmark in personal expression in the pop singer’s music". In a review for the album, Sal Cinquemani of Slant Magazine noted that the song, alongside "Where Has the Love Gone" and "Falling", "all run about two minutes too long".

=== Commercial performance ===
Commercially, "Where Is the Feeling?" charted moderately in Australia, Israel, Scotland, and the United Kingdom. In Australia, the single debuted at number 31 on the ARIA Charts and stayed on the chart for a total of three weeks. It remained Minogue's lowest and weakest-spanning solo single until "In My Arms" (2008) replaced the status, when it peaked at number 35 and stayed in the charts for two weeks. In the United Kingdom, "Where Is the Feeling?" debuted at number 16 on the UK Singles Chart and stayed on the chart for three weeks. Despite reaching the top 20, the single spent only three weeks in the top 75. On 29 July 1995, it reached a peak of number 17 on the UK Airplay Chart. Across the pan-European Hot 100 Singles chart, it attained a peak of number 41, on the issue dated 29 July 1995.

== Promotion ==
The song's accompanying music video was directed by Keir McFarlane, who previously directed the video for "Put Yourself in My Place" (1994), and filmed in a school swimming pool in Los Angeles. It uses the re-recorded version of the single release, and premiered on ITV's The Chart Show on 6 July 1995; it features Minogue sporting red hair, which was dyed specially for her role in Bio-Dome, being pursued through the murky water by an ominous male figure. The video later appeared on Minogue's video compilation The Kylie Tapes: 94-98 (1998). An extended version, which includes an introduction with a countdown, was made available for the first time on Minogue's video compilation Artist Collection (2004).

To further promote "Where Is the Feeling?", Minogue performed the track on Channel 4's Don't Forget Your Toothbrush show, and it also appeared as an interlude on the setlist of Minogue's KylieFever2002 concert tour. The track was also included on three of Minogue's greatest hits albums: Hits+ (2000), Greatest Hits: 87–99 (2003), and Confide in Me: The Irresistible Kylie (2007). The Felix da Housecat Klubb Feelin Mix remix was included on her 2010 remix album 12" Masters – Essential Mixes.

== Track listings ==
- Australian, European and UK CD maxi-single
1. "Where Is the Feeling?" (BIR Dolphin Mix) – 4:14
2. "Where Is the Feeling?" (BIR Soundtrack) – 13:30
3. "Where Is the Feeling?" (Da Klubb Feelin Mix) – 10:50
4. "Where Is the Feeling?" (Morales Mix) – 6:15
5. "Where Is the Feeling?" (BIR Bish Bosh Mix) – 4:49
- Japanese 3-inch CD single
1. "Where Is the Feeling?" – 7:01
2. "Confide in Me" (Master Mix) – 5:52
- UK 12-inch single

A. "Where Is the Feeling?" (BIR Soundtrack) – 13:07
B. "Where Is the Feeling?" (Da Klubb Feelin Mix) – 10:48

- UK cassette single
1. "Where Is the Feeling?" (BIR Dolphin Mix) – 4:12
2. "Where Is the Feeling?" (BIR Bish Bosh Mix) – 4:46
- Australian cassette maxi-single
1. "Where Is the Feeling?" (BIR Dolphin Mix) – 4:12
2. "Where Is the Feeling?" (BIR Soundtrack) – 13:07
3. "Where Is the Feeling?" (Da Klubb Feelin Mix) – 10:50
4. "Where Is the Feeling?" (Morales Mix) – 6:15
5. "Where Is the Feeling?" (BIR Bish Bosh Mix) – 4:46

== Credits and personnel ==
Credits are adapted from the liner notes of Kylie Minogue:

Recording

- Mixed and recorded at Sarm West Studios in London by Paul Wright.

Personnel

- Kylie Minogue – vocals
- Wilf Smarties – songwriter
- Jayn Hanna – songwriter
- Terry Ronald – vocal arranger
- Steve Anderson – producer
- Dave Seaman – producer
- Paul Wright – recording, audio mixing
- Niall Flynn – recording assistant, mixing assistant

== Charts ==
Weekly chart performance for "Where Is the Feeling?"
Chart (1995)	Peak position
Australia (ARIA)	31
Europe (Eurochart Hot 100)	41
Israel (Israeli Singles Chart)	20
Scottish Singles Sales (Official Charts)	15
UK Singles (Official Charts)	16
