= Guillaume de Barrême de Châteaufort =

French painter

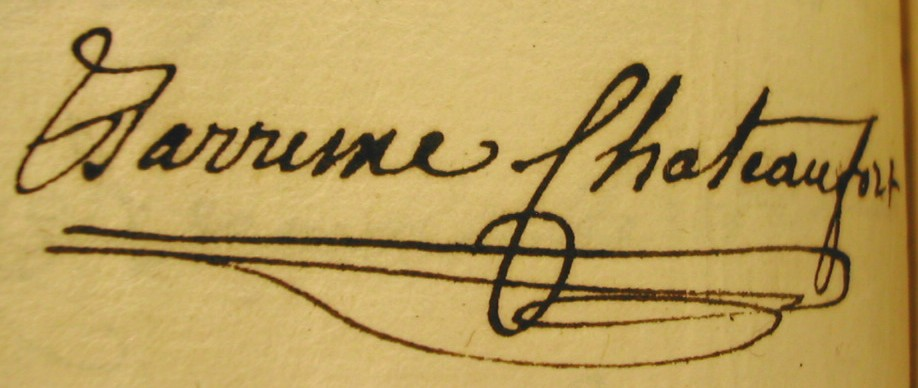
His signature

Guillaume de Barrême de Châteaufort (French pronunciation: [ɡijom də baʁɛm də ʃatofɔʁ]; 6 January 171 – 6 November 1775), chevalier, was a French painter. He was born and died in Arles. He was descended from a converted Jewish family from Navarre which had moved to Arles under the doctor Salomon de la Rabissa (baptised as Jean de Barrême at the start of the 16th century and made a naturalised Frenchman in 1541). Guillaume married Élisabeth de Campan in 1750 and had a daughter with her before leaving her around 1758 to live with Catherine Raspal, sister of his friend the painter Antoine Raspal. The couple had 4 children between 1760 and 1772, including the painter Jacques Réattu. Some years before his death Guillaume moved to Rome and was there received into a painting academy.
