= Kylie Minogue (album) =

1994 album by Kylie Minogue

Studio album by Kylie Minogue
- Released: 19 September 1994
- Recorded: 1993–1994
- Studios: Sarm West (London); Axis (New York); Power Station (New York); Whorga Musica (New York)
- Genre: Dance-pop
- Length: 57:12
- Labels: Deconstruction; Mushroom
- Producers: Steve Anderson; Dave Seaman; M People; Pete Heller; Terry Farley; Jimmy Harry

Kylie Minogue chronology
Kylie's Non-Stop History 50+1 (1993)	Kylie Minogue (1994)	Impossible Princess (1997)

Singles from Kylie Minogue
- 1. "Confide in Me" Released: 29 August 1994; 2. "Where Is the Feeling?" Released: 21 September 1994; 3. "Put Yourself in My Place" Released: 14 November 1994

Kylie Minogue is the fifth studio album recorded by Australian singer Kylie Minogue. Deconstruction released it in the United Kingdom on 19 September 1994, while a release was issued through Mushroom Records in Australia on the same date. After leaving Pete Waterman Entertainment, Minogue wanted to establish her credibility and signed with the independent record label Deconstruction in early 1993. She became involved with a diverse group of collaborators in order to experiment with different sounds. After generally unsuccessful sessions with Saint Etienne and The Rapino Brothers, Minogue collaborated with new producers including Brothers in Rhythm, M People, Farley & Heller, and Jimmy Harry.

Musically, Kylie Minogue is a dance-pop album also containing elements of R&B and adult contemporary music. Lyrically, the album touches on themes of love, seduction and womanhood. Music critics praised the production and Minogue's vocals, while observing the start of a new phase in Minogue's career. The album peaked in the top five in the United Kingdom and Australia, alongside being certified gold in both countries. It attained top 40 positions in Switzerland, Sweden and Scotland. Minogue received three nominations at the ARIA Music Awards of 1995 for her work on Kylie Minogue, winning Best Video for "Put Yourself In My Place".

To promote the album, a limited edition coffee-table book photographed by Ellen von Unwerth and Katerina Jebb was released to highfliers. Three singles were released—"Confide in Me", "Put Yourself in My Place" and "Where Is the Feeling?"—each of which peaked inside the top 20 in the UK; the first two reached the top 20 in Australia. Minogue was involved with two film projects at the time Kylie Minogue dropped, which delayed the promotional process several times. The album was re-issued in Europe in 2018 and returned to the UK Albums Chart and the Scottish Albums Chart.

== Background ==
In 1991, Minogue released her fourth studio album under Pete Waterman Limited (PWL), titled Let's Get to It. The album was recorded after songwriter Matt Aitken had left Stock Aitken Waterman (SAW) earlier that year, which left Pete Waterman and Mike Stock to write and produce the album. Minogue, who co-wrote six tracks with the producers for the album, was disappointed with the output. She felt SAW had reverted to formulaic sounds and by the time Let's Get to It came out, "the magic [had] gone and the record sank quickly". By the end of 1992, PWL did not renew their contract with Minogue, believing the singer "was [not] moving in a direction that was going to be successful", according to PWL co-owner David Howells. Minogue's final release under PWL was Greatest Hits (1992), which debuted at number one in the United Kingdom and reached number three in Australia.

After the split, Minogue wanted to establish her credibility and refused to fall back into the same market as PWL. She turned down several major record labels, among them EMI and A&M, and subsequently signed to indie label Deconstruction in early 1993. Deconstruction was known for being an innovative part of the dance scene, but it was unusual for a mainstream pop artist to sign an indie label contract. Deconstruction founder Pete Hadfield found Minogue to be a driven and creative artist, who needs to show her more experimental side. The label promised creative freedom, both musically and artistically, which persuaded Minogue. "I liked [Deconstruction's] attitude, I quite liked their arrogance, and I liked the vision they had. [...] There wouldn't be much point in leaving PWL and going somewhere exactly the same, so it was a big change", Minogue said.

== Recording and development ==
=== 1993: Early sessions ===
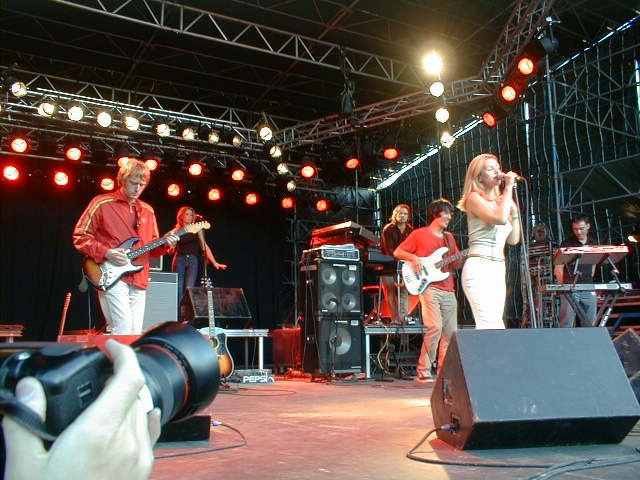
English band Saint Etienne (pictured in 1998) was involved in the early recording sessions for Kylie Minogue, but their work was mostly scrapped.

Hadfield intended to push Minogue towards a more unconventional approach to dance music. As work began on her new music, an early meeting with Deconstruction took place to discuss which direction Minogue intended to pursue. She decided to experiment with different sounds rather than record more pop songs. Minogue took an active role in planning for the album and sought a diverse group of collaborators to work with, including both mainstream and underground talents. Hadfield and Quentin Harrison of PopMatters referred to the process as the rebranding of Minogue as a pop artist. In an interview with NME, Keith Cameron wrote that Minogue "talks in the amazed tones of a blind child who has just rediscovered the gift of sight", with regard to the making of the album.

Early recording sessions for Kylie Minogue took place in 1993, with help from Saint Etienne and The Rapino Brothers. However, most of the tracks were deemed to be taking Minogue in the wrong direction and were scrapped. Some tracks were subsequently used as B-sides on singles and bonus tracks for different editions of Kylie Minogue. Bob Stanley of Saint Etienne remarked that the singer's camp "had no idea what they wanted, apart from being different from the SAW stuff", though he expressed his amazement at her powerful voice and wide vocal range, which SAW's multitracking, reverb, distortions and pitch-shifting had previously masked. The first recording Minogue did after she signed with Deconstruction was a new version of Saint Etienne's third single "Nothing Can Stop Us" (1991). Minogue had written eight songs with the Rapino Brothers; all but one–"Automatic Love"–were scrapped. "Automatic Love" ended up on the tracklist of Kylie Minogue and was the only song to list Minogue as a songwriter.

Several songwriters and producers unsuccessfully approached Minogue to work with them during the production process. American singer-songwriter Prince invited Minogue to his studio for a social visit after she met him backstage at Earl's Court, London. She handed him some lyrics she had written for a song entitled "Baby Doll"; Prince managed to finish the song and record Minogue's lyrics on a cassette tape but never properly recorded it. Minogue did suggest it to the label, but they were not into the track. Minogue and Lenny Kravitz had talked about working together, but he was busy making his fourth studio album Mama Said (1991), and composing Vanessa Paradis's 1992 self-titled album. The singer and Bobby Gillespie of Primal Scream had talked about working together in 1992, before two other band members discussed doing a different version of "Don't Fight It, Feel It" (from Screamadelica, 1991) with Minogue, but their record label wanted the band to finish their 1994 album first. British groups the Beloved and the Auteurs wrote at least one song for Kylie Minogue, but the material did not work out. Nick Cave had talked about a song written especially for Minogue to sing from the point of view of a murdered woman. The song, "Where the Wild Roses Grow", was released as a single in 1995 and later appeared on Cave's Murder Ballads album in 1996.

=== 1993–1994: Later development ===
Hadfield and fellow Deconstruction co-founder Keith Blackhurst were friends with Steve Anderson and Dave Seaman, an electronic duo known as Brothers in Rhythm. Brothers in Rhythm had been involved with Minogue on a remix of "Finer Feelings", a single taken from Let's Get to It. When they heard Minogue had signed with Deconstruction, the duo called Blackhurst and asked to collaborate, despite having no prior experience writing for others. Minogue met Brothers in Rhythm at DMC Studios in Slough, where they had a meeting and set up the original sessions. Anderson said that Minogue was inspiring and open to trying out different sounds, while the label had faith in them and did not want to limit creativity. Minogue's stylist William Baker found her to be the "perfect vehicle" for the duo's hybrids: "Her vocal range and willingness to experiment musically meant that Steve and Dave could push the envelope further."

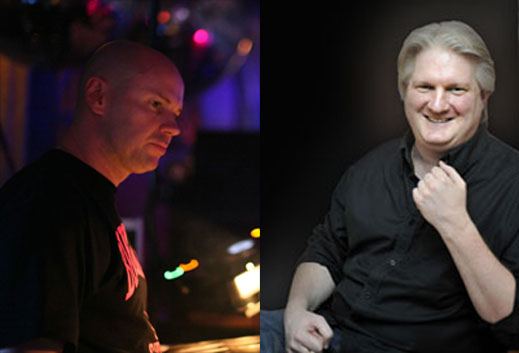
Electronic music duo Brothers in Rhythm wrote and produced multiple tracks on Kylie Minogue.

Minogue traveled from her residence in Chelsea and tried songs out at DMC Studios for months. The producers initially had their work cut out for them because of Minogue's nasal vocals, while she gained confidence in her vocals throughout the course of recording Kylie Minogue. Their first efforts resulted in "Confide in Me", a song that came together within an hour. Minogue recorded the original demo in one take, which ended up being used on the final recording. The producers were pleased with the result, calling it "without a shadow of doubt the best [Minogue track] we were involved with". A cover version of Prefab Sprout's "If You Don't Love Me" was recorded in only one take, as the producers wanted to experiment with Minogue's musical boundaries. Brothers in Rhythm was enlisted as the album's chief producer and produced four of the tracks: "Where Is the Feeling?" (originally recorded by Within a Dream in 1993), "Automatic Love" (a rework from material with the Rapino Brothers), "Confide in Me" and "Dangerous Game" (both songs written and produced by the duo). Another rework from the material with the Rapino Brothers is "Love Is on the Line"; however, it remains commercially unreleased. In London, the songs were recorded at Sarm West Studios.

Jimmy Harry wrote and produced "Put Yourself in My Place", written specially for Minogue, and "If I Was Your Lover". These songs, recorded in New York City at the Axis Studios, Power Station and Whorga Musica, were the only tracks recorded outside the UK. Minogue recorded a song entitled "Intuition" during these sessions, which was shelved until 2019, when Harry gave the demo to American singer Liz for her album Planet Y2K. Neil Tennant and Chris Lowe, better known as Pet Shop Boys, were approached by Minogue's camp after the pair finished work on Very (1993). They declined initially, but Lowe came up with a set of chords that Tennant found similar to Minogue's previous work with SAW and suggested they turn it into a song for her. The demo for "Falling" was sent to Deconstruction, where it was reworked by Fire Island, an English music duo made up of Pete Heller and Terry Farley. Tennant found the result very different from the original demo, saying, "It doesn't really have the same tune in it, for instance, and they haven't put the chorus in, but I suppose that's very modern." Minogue's label mate M People produced "Time Will Pass You By" for Kylie Minogue but could not commit to do more because of a busy schedule. Gerry DeVeaux, songwriter and Kravitz's cousin, produced and co-wrote "Surrender" with composer Charlie Mole; it was originally recorded by American actress Tia Carrere for her 1993 album Dreams. Three of the songs on the album are cover versions of largely unknown tracks: "Where Has The Love Gone?", "Time Will Pass You By" and "Where Is the Feeling?".

== Musical styles ==
Kylie Minogue is primarily a dance-pop album that integrates elements of R&B and adult contemporary music. Chris True of AllMusic wrote that the album is a remarkable change from Minogue's previous teen pop material with an "atmosphere and style in the songs that wasn't there on Let's Get to It". In the biography Kylie: Naked (2012), Nigel Goodall and Jenny Stanley-Clarke describe the album as a collection of "upbeat dance tracks, lightweight funky numbers and smoochy ballads". Music critics extensively commented on the album's musical diversity. Paul Bowler of Record Collector noted the album "frolics gaily amongst the myriad contemporary dance styles of '94". Ian Gormely of Exclaim! found influences from house, techno and new jack swing, while an editor of Be With Records pointed out the ambient, Balearic and R&B elements. Portions of hip-hop, acid jazz and club music were also listed by Harrison.

The album opens with "Confide in Me", a song incorporating elements of indie pop and Middle Eastern instrumentation like strings and percussion. The opening part of the track features an arrangement by musician Will Malone and a piano section by Anderson, which was performed on a Bösendorfer. Frankie Knuckles and David Morales' classic musical elements influenced Anderson when he produced Minogue's cover of "Where Is the Feeling?". The producers added live piano, guitar and percussion to the album's version of the song. The disco and acid jazz-based track was compared with the work of British acts such as The Brand New Heavies, Jamiroquai and Incognito. "Dangerous Game" and "Automatic Love" are prominently driven by string instruments.

"Surrender" is a seductive slow jam track, with Balearic pop, jazz and R&B-influences. It is followed by the mid-tempo pop-funk "If I Was Your Lover". "Put Yourself in My Place" is a melancholy quiet storm power ballad with trip hop beats that resembles late 1980s American R&B tracks. Produced by Heller and Farley, "Where Has The Love Gone" and "Falling" are tempestuous uptempo tracks that run over six minutes each. Bowler compared both tracks to the work of American producer Larry Heard. Minogue whispers the lyrics on "Falling", a house slow-burner with the bass-heavy rhythm and high backing vocals. The album ends with "Time Will Pass You By", is a sophisticated, grinning piano-house song.

== Themes and vocals ==
The album touches on themes of love and womanhood. Robbert Tilli and Machgiel Bakke of Music & Media compared the sensual tone throughout the album to Madonna's Erotica (1992). "Confide in Me" talks about Minogue's earnest seduction and manipulating people to confide into her. English musician Edward Barton is credited as a co-writer under the name Owain Barton, along with Anderson and Seaman, because of the interpolations from his song "It's a Fine Day" (1983). "Put Yourself in My Place" is a plaintive appeal to a former lover who had fallen for someone else. "Automatic Love" is a chilled-out track that contains technology references. Minogue sings "I didn't feel you enter / In my main menu / But every time I touch the key / The screen is showing you." "Where Has the Love Gone?" contains dainty lines like "I'm a woman and I've got my vanity". The closer track, "Time Will Pass You By", encapsulates Minogue's trademark joie de vivre message: not taking life for granted and enjoying it to its fullest.

Minogue adapted more breathy and resonant vocals on the album. She sings in a wide range of notes while adding sighs, murmurs, and whispers on several tracks. The album also features sitars and subtle backing vocals. John Mangan of The Age felt that her vocals are "more breathy, more swooping, more assured than ever". Caroline Sullivan of The Guardian wrote that the frailty of her vocals "impart a more appealing vulnerability." Jon Casimir of The Sydney Morning Herald noticed her Mid-Atlantic accent on the album, with the exception of a monologue on "If I Was Your Lover", which he thought sounds more American than Madonna does.

== Artwork and title ==
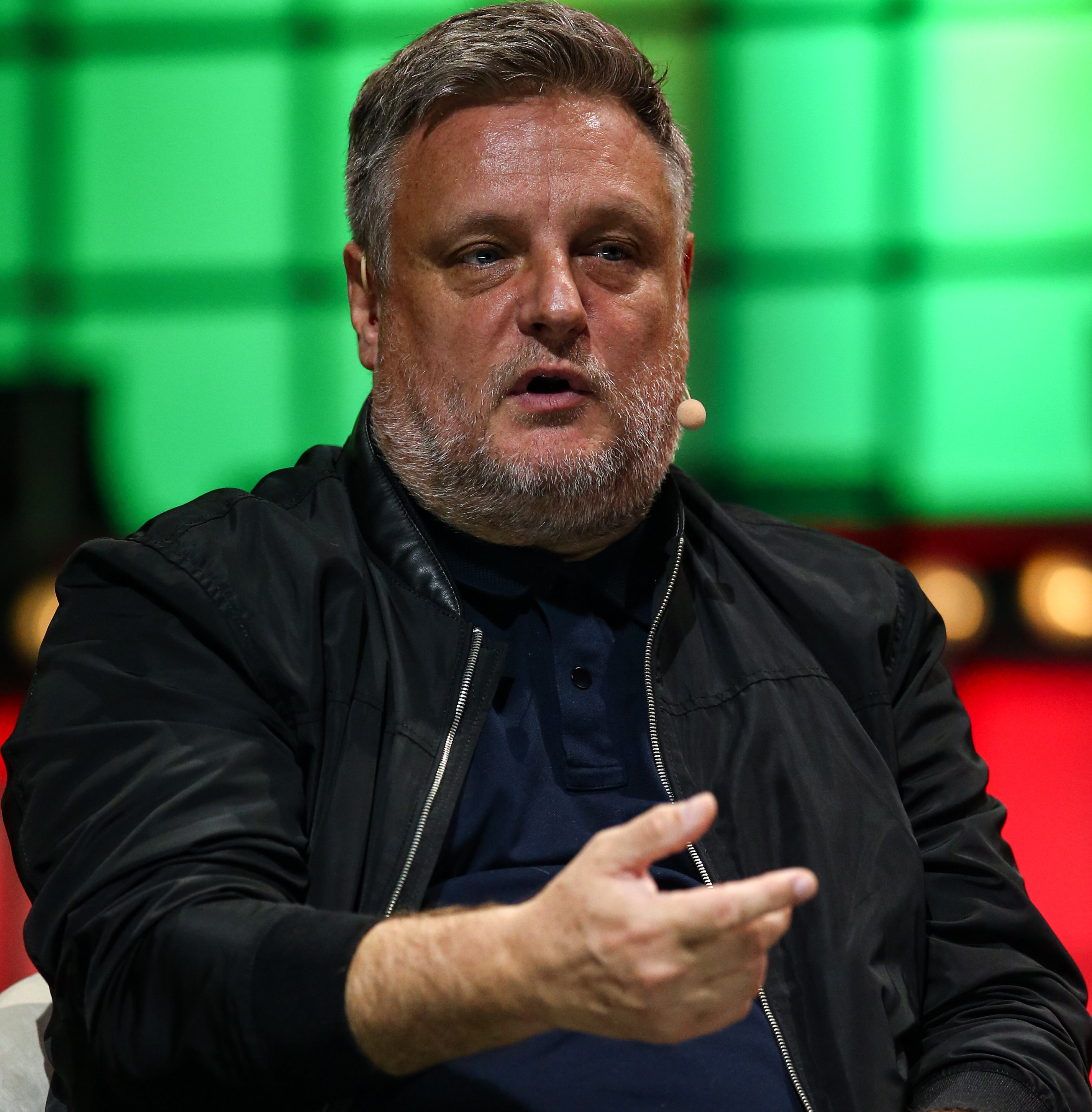
British photographer Rankin (pictured in 2019) shot the album cover during a photoshoot for Dazed & Confused.

British photographer Rankin shot the artwork for Kylie Minogue, with the assistance of British stylist Katie Grand. Mark Farrow was selected to design the cover. Deconstruction paid for Rankin and Grand to fly to Los Angeles and do a photoshoot with Minogue for Dazed & Confused, a British fashion magazine that Rankin founded in 1991. Grand took part in directing and styling fashion shoots for the magazine during the time. The shoot for an inlay section called "Kylie Bible" lasted for around six or seven hours outside a film studio. Grand tried to make Minogue's image more androgynous. Deconstruction approved the photographs and kept one image for later use on the album cover.

The black-and-white cover shows a barefoot Minogue, licking her lips and crouching low, with her hair brushed back behind her ears. She wears a dark Paul Smith trouser suit and a pair of glasses. In the biography Kylie (2014), Sean Smith says Minogue posed like "a leopard sizing up her prey" while wearing Clark Kent glasses, further writing that the cover is remarkably different from her previous ones. Robbie Daw of Idolator described Minogue as a seductive nerd, while Goodall and Clarke compared her to the character of Miss Moneypenny. Tamasin Doe of Evening Standard noted the cover reflects the trend of wearing glasses to be taken seriously, and linked Minogue's solemn image to the television series Joe 90. Christian Guiltenane of Classic Pop comments that Minogue's image had changed considerably in just five years, saying the shots are a mix of "sultry poses, avant garde styling and sex". A replica of the green taffeta suit that Minogue worn for the cover shot was donated to the Cultural Gifts Program of the Arts Centre Melbourne.

Kylie Minogue is the second studio album named after the singer, following her debut Kylie in 1988. Minogue said that the album was named after her because she wanted to introduce her new sound "that other people might copy". Smith feels the simple title might seem to be unimaginative, but it shows Minogue eager to start over and reintroduce herself to the public. Australian programme Rage wrote that the title completes "the 'rebirth' feel [that Minogue] had established by leaving PWL". Charles Shaar Murray of The Daily Telegraph suggested the artwork shows two different sides of Minogue, an intelligent modern woman with deep desires. Bowler commented that by subtly adding Minogue's surname to the title, as well as her formal outfit and lascivious pose on the cover, she successfully announced "the arrival of a more sophisticated artist" who wanted to be taken seriously.

== Release and promotion ==
Kylie Minogue was released on 19 September 1994 in the UK and other European countries by Deconstruction, and in Australia simultaneously by Mushroom Records. In Japan, it was released on 21 October 1994 by the former of the two labels with two bonus tracks: "Love Is Waiting" (written by Tracy Ackerman, Mike Percy and Tim Lever of Dead or Alive) and "Nothing Can Stop Us". Deconstruction issued the album in Canada in 1995, featuring an alternate artwork and a franglais version of "Confide in Me", known as "Fie-toi à moi". Following the release of Enjoy Yourself (1989), Minogue failed to find an audience in the United States. American independent label Imago Records intended to release Kylie Minogue in the US, with a commercial release of "Confide in Me" in November 1994. The label, however, was facing serious financial problems and quickly parted ways with BMG in 1995. Imago withdrew all current releases, including the album, which was scheduled for Spring 1995.

Kylie Minogue was re-released in Australia in 1998 to celebrate the 25th anniversary of Mushroom Records. BMG and Mushroom released a special edition of Kylie Minogue with remastered tracks in May 2003, which contains remixes, B-sides, and a previously unreleased track, titled "Dangerous Overture". The album was later reissued on vinyl for the first time, as a double vinyl, by Be With Records in 2016 in the UK; and in 2018 by BMG as a white vinyl exclusively through Sainsbury's supermarket chain in European countries. Several album tracks and two unreleased tracks ("Gotta Move On" and "Difficult by Design") from Kylie Minogue appear on Hits+ (2000), which was released in Europe.

Minogue promoted the album with a limited-edition coffee-table book that was not commercially available in October 1994. The minimalist photographs are mostly black-and-white, depicting a stripped-back Minogue. Ellen von Unwerth shot the photographs in New York City while Minogue recorded there. "It wasn't my choice to get down to a négligé but that's the way Ellen shoots", Minogue said. Photographer Katerina Jebb and Baker, Minogue's frequent collaborators, met for the first time and came up with a Debbie Harry-themed photoshoot for the book. Baker provided many old punk-style costumes for Minogue; among them was a 1970s sleeveless Marilyn Monroe T-shirt that once belonged to a staff member at Andy Warhol's the Factory studio. The collection of images of Minogue in seductive poses and see-through costumes was compared to Madonna's highly controversial Sex book (1992). Minogue defended herself by claiming that she had plans to do a coffee-table book before Sex came out, and that the book was inspired by Janet Jackson's topless image on the cover of her 1993 self-titled album. She said: "It would be incredibly foolish of me to try to copy Madonna. I'm just trying to fight through and find out who I am. That was the idea of putting the book together."

=== Singles ===
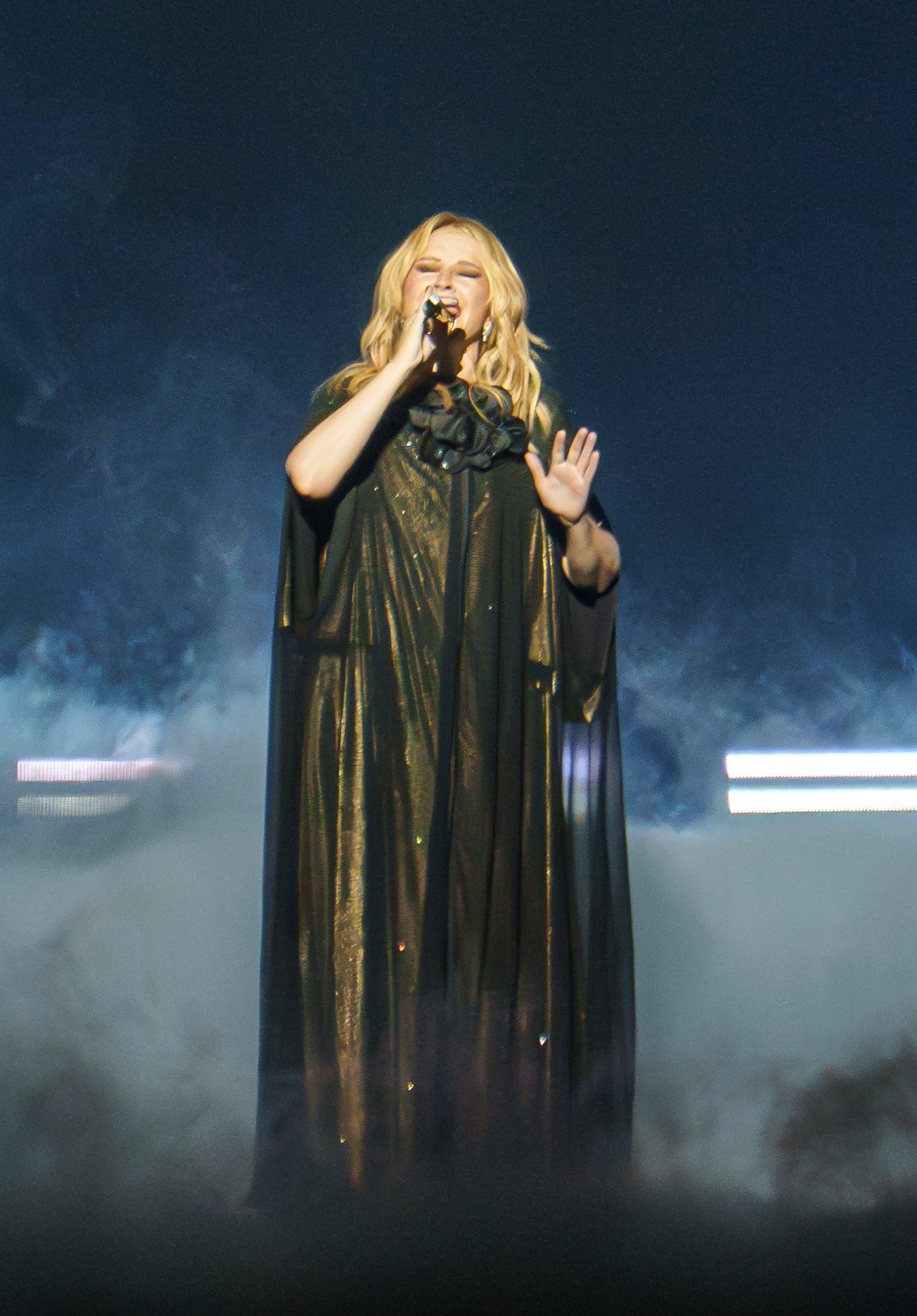
Minogue performing lead single "Confide in Me" on 2025's Tension Tour

"Confide in Me", the lead single from Kylie Minogue, was released in August 1994. Her covers of "Nothing Can Stop Us" and "If You Don't Love Me", alongside a 10-minute remix by Brothers in Rhythm, were included on the single's B-side. In the US, Phillip Damien remixed the single, titled the "Confession Mix", featuring his signature twisted loops and energetic beats; while Fire Island featured on a remix of "Where Has The Love Gone?" on the B-side. Black-and-white promotional photographs for "Confide in Me" saw Minogue sporting an afro. In the music video, directed by Paul Boyd, Minogue plays six different versions of herself, filming a commercial for a phone number and inviting viewers to call and reveal their secrets. "Confide in Me" was Minogue's biggest international hit of the decade, debuting at number two in the UK, while reaching numbers 10 and 39 in France and on the US Billboard Dance Club Play chart, respectively. In her native Australia, it spent four weeks at number one on the ARIA Singles Chart.

After the release of "Confide in Me", Minogue was busy promoting Street Fighter (1994), her first Hollywood-funded project since The Delinquents (1989). The second single, "Put Yourself in My Place", was released in November. Rankin photographed the cover art featuring Minogue posing with headphones, to represent a "serious" approach to her music. Directed by Kier McFarlane, the music video recreates the opening sequence of the classic Jane Fonda film Barbarella (1968), while Minogue performs a slow striptease inside a spacecraft. "Put Yourself in My Place" narrowly missed the top 10, reached number 11 in both Australia and the UK.

"If I Was Your Lover" was intended as the follow-up single after "Put Yourself in My Place" in the US, but the plan was scrapped. "Where Is the Feeling?" was released as the third and final single in July 1995, seven months after the release of the second single, while in Japan, it was released on 21 September 1994 as the album's lead single. "Where Is the Feeling?" was planned initially as the follow-up single to "Confide In Me", before being scheduled for release in April 1995 but was delayed again when Minogue was filming Bio-Dome (1996) in the US. Brothers In Rhythm handled the remix for the single release, replacing the "bright and breezy vocal" of the album version with a murmured verse and a bass heavy backing track. Mixes by Felix da Housecat and Morales were also included. Minogue appeared with red hair, which was dyed specially for her role in Bio-Dome, during the promotional process for "Where Is the Feeling?". The music video, also directed by McFarlane, saw Minogue being pursued through the water by an ominous figure. The single only reached number 16 in the UK and number 31 in Australia. Minogue once considered "Time Will Pass You By" as the concluding single; instead, she worked with Cave on the single "Where the Wild Roses Grow" and released it in late 1995.

== Critical reception ==
Professional ratings
Review scores
Source	Rating
AllMusic	3/5 stars
Digital Spy	4/5 stars
Encyclopedia of Popular Music	2/5 stars
The Guardian	4/4 stars
Music Week	4/5 stars
NME	4/10
Record Collector	4/5 stars
Smash Hits	3/5 stars

Kylie Minogue was met with generally positive reviews from music critics, many of whom praised its production. Sullivan wrote that although multiple producers were involved, the album is "absolutely cohesive, excellent dance-pop". Jonathan Bernstein of Spin and Mangan called it a polished piece of work, and singled out "Confide in Me" for praise. Writing for Music & Media, Tilli and Bakke praised the overall quality and compared the album favourably to Janet Jackson's Control (1986). Critics commented on the album's length; Sal Cinquemani of Slant Magazine viewed its length as an embracement of club music that emulates classic 12" house records. In a mixed review, Casimir felt that the album lacks of emphasis, and its production is made for the "slickness-loving US market".

Multiple reviewers highlighted Minogue's improved vocals and her mature perceptions. Cinquemani credited her for delivering a sensual and understated performance, while True felt she "wanted to sound grown-up, and she pulls it off with ease". Sharing the same sentiments were Sullivan and Mangan, who felt Minogue successfully transformed herself to a more sensual and credible artist. Levine opined that the early critics of her vocals would be surprised with her delivery on "Automatic Love". Murray commented that the songs were made to fit her thin voice, which often goes shrill when raised. Writing for Playboy, Marc Andrews found the album mature enough but the producers tried too hard to push Minogue's “limited vocal range into soul diva territory”.

In their retrospect reviews, Cinquemani and True interpreted the album as a creative and stylish statement for the second phase of Minogue's career; the former critic also ranked it Minogue's ninth-best studio album, praising its mid-tempo material. Levine and Oliver Hurley of Classic Pop commented that the sophisticated and cohesive record is unmarked by the passing years. Harrison deemed Kylie Minogue a major leap of progress and compared it favourably to Madonna's Bedtime Stories (1994); he concluded that these two records have "rippled through Madonna and Minogue's legacies, career-wise and artistically". Bowler commented that the 2016 reissue of Kylie Minogue was especially apposite in the contemporary well-crafted pop scene by the likes of Taylor Swift and Carly Rae Jepsen. The album was Minogue's only studio album, apart from Let's Get to It, to receive a two-star rating from British writer Colin Larkin in the Encyclopedia of Popular Music (2011), who classified it as "disappointing", "weak or dull and not recommended".

Minogue received three nominations at the ARIA Music Awards of 1995 for her work on Kylie Minogue: Best Female Artist, Highest Selling Single for "Confide In Me" and Best Video for "Put Yourself In My Place", winning the latter category.

== Commercial performance ==
Kylie Minogue experienced moderate worldwide success. The album debuted and peaked at number four in the UK, becoming her fifth top-10 entry on the UK Albums Chart. It fell to number 13 the following week and spent a total of 20 weeks on the chart. The British Phonographic Industry (BPI) certified Kylie Minogue gold within a month of the album's release for selling over 100,000 copies in the UK. In 2016, the reissue of Kylie Minogue sold out 500 copies on its initial pre-order run. Two years later, the 2018 reissue peaked at number 67 on the UK Albums Chart and number nine on the separate UK Independent Albums Chart on 28 September. The 2018 reissue also appeared on the Scottish Albums Chart, reaching number 30—Kylie Minogue had previously peaked at number 15 there after its original release in 1994. The album had sold 124,806 copies in the UK by October 2020.

In her native Australia, Kylie Minogue debuted at number three and spent 11 weeks on the ARIA Albums chart. It was the 84th best-selling album of 1994 and was certified gold by the Australian Recording Industry Association (ARIA) for selling over 35,000 copies in Australia. Kylie Minogue also peaked at number 39 in Sweden, number 33 in Switzerland, and number 78 in Germany during its 1998 release. In Japan, the album peaked at number 54 on the Oricon Albums Chart and had sold 23,440 copies by 2006.

== Track listing ==
Kylie Minogue – Standard edition
No.	Title	Writer(s)	Producer(s)	Length
1.	"Confide in Me"	Steve Anderson; Dave Seaman; Owain Barton	Brothers in Rhythm	5:51
2.	"Surrender"	Gerry DeVeaux; Charlie Mole	DeVeaux; John Waddle; Tim Bran	4:25
3.	"If I Was Your Lover"	Jimmy Harry	Harry	4:45
4.	"Where Is the Feeling?"	Wilf Smarties; Jayn Hanna	Brothers in Rhythm	6:59
5.	"Put Yourself in My Place"	Harry	Harry	4:54
6.	"Dangerous Game"	Anderson; Seaman	Brothers in Rhythm	5:30
7.	"Automatic Love"	Kylie Minogue; Inga Humpe; Charlie Mallozzi; Marco Sabiu	Brothers in Rhythm	4:45
8.	"Where Has the Love Gone?"	Alex Palmer; Julie Stapleton	Pete Heller; Terry Farley	7:46
9.	"Falling"	Neil Tennant; Chris Lowe	Heller; Farley	6:43
10.	"Time Will Pass You By"	Dino Fekaris; Nick Zesses; John Rhys	M People	5:26
Total length:				57:12

Kylie Minogue – Japanese edition
No.	Title	Writer(s)	Producer(s)	Length
11.	"Love Is Waiting"	Mike Percy; Tim Lever; Tracy Ackerman	Brothers in Rhythm	4:46
12.	"Nothing Can Stop Us"	Bob Stanley; Pete Wiggs	Saint Etienne	4:04
Total length:				66:02

Kylie Minogue – Canadian edition
No.	Title	Writer(s)	Producer(s)	Length
11.	"Confide in Me" (French version)	Anderson; Seaman; Barton	Brothers in Rhythm	5:51
Total length:				63:03

Kylie Minogue – Special edition bonus disc
No.	Title	Writer(s)	Producer(s)	Length
1.	"Dangerous Overture"	Anderson; Seaman	Brothers in Rhythm	1:18
2.	"Confide in Me" (Justin Warfield mix)	Anderson; Seaman; Barton	Brothers in Rhythm	5:26
3.	"Put Yourself in My Place" (Dan's Old School mix)	Harry	Harry	4:29
4.	"Where Is the Feeling?" (Acoustic version)	Smarties; Hanna	Brothers in Rhythm	4:49
5.	"Nothing Can Stop Us"	Stanley; Wiggs	Saint Etienne	4:04
6.	"Love Is Waiting"	Percy; Lever; Ackerman	Brothers in Rhythm	4:46
7.	"Time Will Pass You By" (Paul Masterson mix)	Fekaris; Zesses; Rhys	M People	7:32
8.	"Where Is the Feeling?" (West End TKO mix)	Smarties; Hanna	Brothers in Rhythm	8:09
9.	"Falling" (alternative mix)	Tennant; Lowe	Heller; Farley	8:38
10.	"Confide in Me" (Big Brothers mix)	Anderson; Seaman; Barton	Brothers in Rhythm	10:26
11.	"Surrender" (Talking Soul mix)	DeVeaux; Mole	DeVeaux; Waddle; Bran	4:25
12.	"Put Yourself in My Place" (acoustic version)	Harry	Harry	4:45
13.	"If You Don't Love Me" (acoustic version)	Paddy McAloon	Brothers in Rhythm	2:08
14.	"Confide in Me" (French version)	Anderson; Seaman; Barton	Brothers in Rhythm	5:51
Total length:				76:46

Notes

- "Confide in Me" contains interpolations of "It's a Fine Day", written by Edward Barton. He is credited as Owain Barton.

== Personnel ==
Adapted from the album's liner notes.

- Kylie Minogue – lead vocals
- Greg Bone – guitar
- Steve Anderson – piano, production
- Brothers in Rhythm – production, arrangement
- Dancin' Danny D – production, remixing
- Gerry DeVeaux – production, arrangement
- Jimmy Harry – production, arrangement
- Terry Farley – production, engineering
- M People – production, arrangement
- Paul Masterson – production, remixing
- Ronin – producer, remixing
- Saint Etienne – production
- Dave Seaman – production
- John Waddell – production, arrangement
- Justin Warfield – production, remixing
- Wil Malone – string arrangements
- Richard Niles – string arrangements, brass arrangement, orchestral arrangements
- Andy Bradfield – engineering
- Tim Bran – engineering, associate production
- Ian Catt – engineering
- Doug DeAngelis – engineering, mixing
- Terry Farley – engineering
- Paul West – engineering, mixing
- Gary Wilkinson – engineering
- Paul Wright III – engineering, mixing
- Dave Pemberton – engineering, mixing
- Niall Flynn – engineering assistance, assistance
- Paul Anthony Taylor – programming
- Tom Parker – liner notes, project consultant
- Katie Grand – styling
- Rankin – photography

== Charts ==
=== Weekly charts ===
Chart performance for Kylie Minogue in 1994–98
Chart (1994–1998)	Peak position
Australian Albums (ARIA)	3
European Albums (Music & Media)	22
German Albums (Offizielle Top 100)	78
Japanese Albums (Oricon)	54
Scottish Albums (OCC)	15
Swedish Albums (Sverigetopplistan)	39
Swiss Albums (Schweizer Hitparade)	33
UK Albums (OCC)	4

Chart performance for Kylie Minogue in 2018
Chart (2018)	Peak position
Scottish Albums (OCC)	30
UK Albums (OCC)	67
UK Independent Albums (OCC)	9

=== Year-end charts ===
1994 year-end chart performance for Kylie Minogue
Chart (1994)	Position
Australian Albums (ARIA)	84

== Certifications and sales ==
Certifications and sales for Kylie Minogue
Region	Certification	Certified units/sales
Australia (ARIA)	Gold	35,000^{^}
Japan	—	23,440
United Kingdom (BPI)	Gold	124,806
^{^} Shipments figures based on certification alone.

== Release history ==
Release dates and formats for Kylie Minogue
Region	Date	Format(s)	Label(s)	Ref(s).
United Kingdom	19 September 1994	CD; cassette; LP	Deconstruction	
Europe	19 September 1994	CD; cassette; LP	Deconstruction	
Australia	19 September 1994	CD; cassette; LP	Mushroom	
Japan	21 October 1994	CD; cassette; LP	Deconstruction	
Canada	1995	CD; cassette; LP	Deconstruction	
Australia	1998	CD	Mushroom	
Australia	23 May 2003	CD	Mushroom	
Japan	23 May 2003	CD	BMG	
United Kingdom	23 May 2003	CD	BMG	
United Kingdom	2 February 2016	LP	Be With Records	
Europe	2018	LP	BMG	

== See also ==
- List of UK top-ten albums in 1994
