= Katerina Jebb =

British artist and photographer

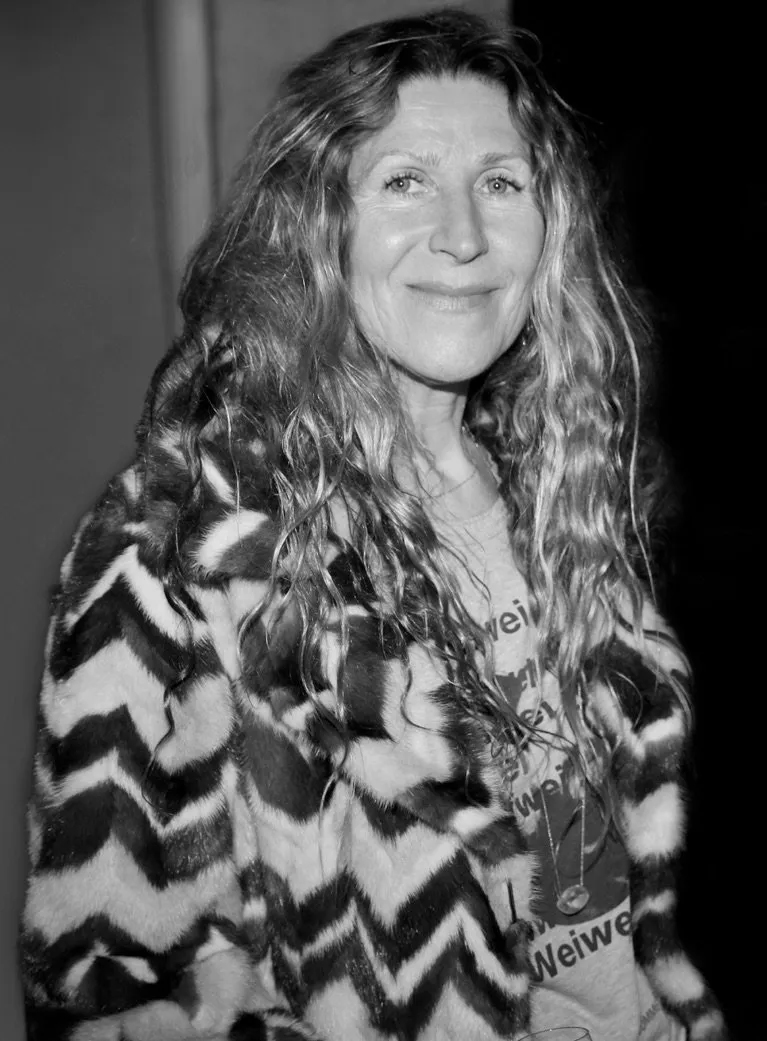
- Born: 15 November 1962; United Kingdom
- Known for: Photography, scanography, film, photomontage
- Website: https://katerinajebb.com

Katerina Jebb is a British contemporary artist whose work explores systems of classification, reproduction, and display, particularly within museums and archives. She is best known for her large-scale photographic works produced using flatbed and museum scanning technologies, which isolate and magnify objects from institutional collections, transforming them into highly detailed, monumental images. Jebb’s practice frequently engages with questions of authorship, originality, and the politics of representation. By employing scanning processes normally associated with documentation and conservation, she removes objects from their historical or cultural contexts and presents them as visual data, emphasizing surface, texture, and form.

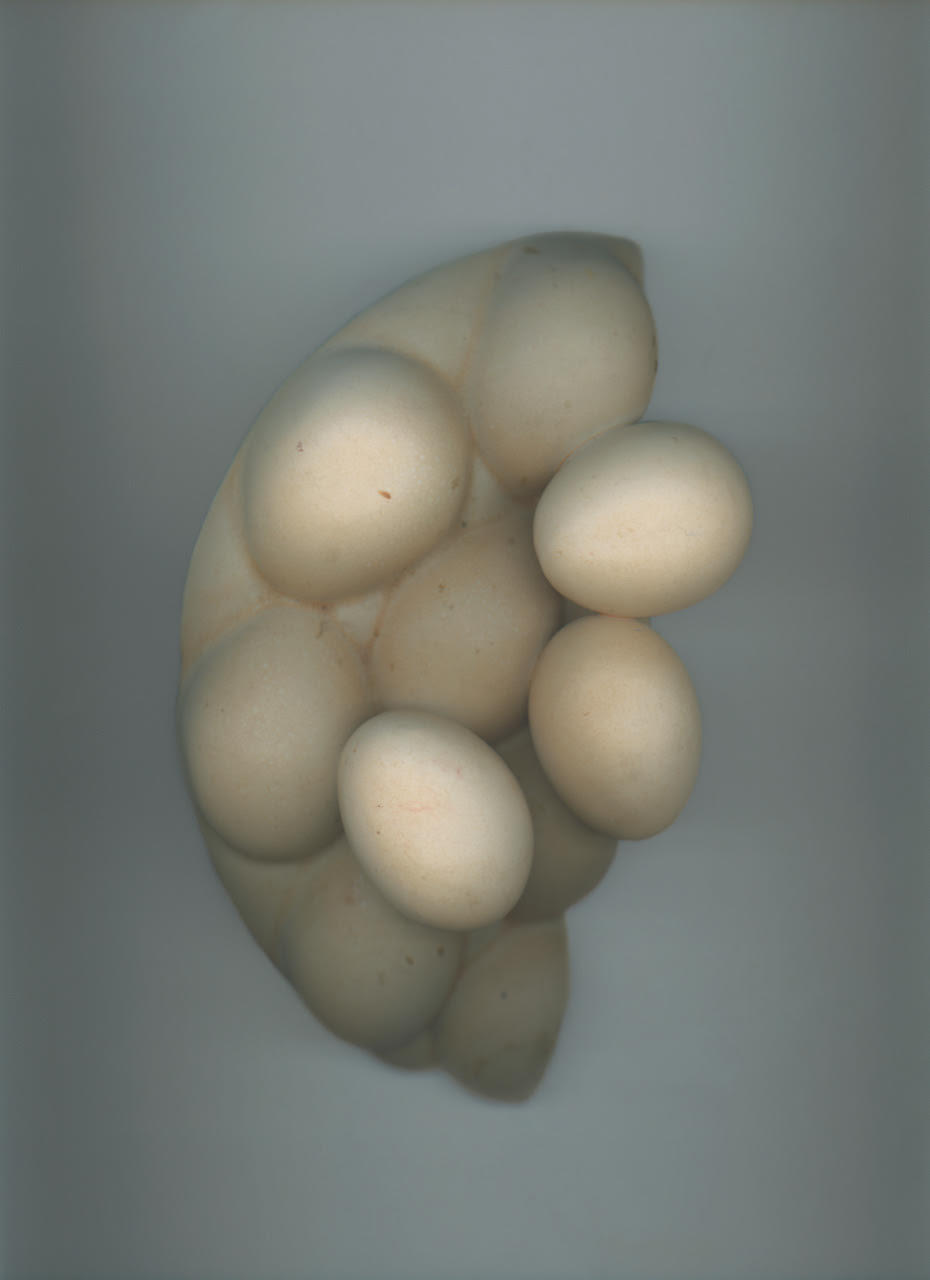
Katerina Jebb, Eggs, 2013.

== Technique ==
Katerina Jebb’s practice replaces the traditional camera with a high-resolution scanner to create life-sized, highly detailed images. The digital scanner operates through a precise mechanical and optical sequence that converts a physical object into a high-resolution digital image. The trajectory of the scanner refers both to the physical movement of its internal components and to the path of light and data during the scanning process.

"I watched her scan the intricately hand-stitched, Nile-blue silk corset worn by Marie Antoinette in 1793. She made 21 passes, 12 for the front, nine for the back. The result, after adjustment in Photoshop, revealed minute details. Such perceptible, nearly touchable, clarity isn’t possible with a lens camera, but is ideal for museums that want to display objects too fragile for even short-term exposure. That clarity convinced the conservators of this garment to allow her to scan it in the first place."

Jeff Rian, Crossing Eros, Deus Ex Machina, Katerina Jebb, Musée Réattu, Skira, 2016

"In Jebb’s works, life overflows, immediately exceeds the frame the artist defines by means of the scanner through which she approaches, as closely as possible, the body of the woman posing. This woman is not a professional model; she is a friend, and it is from that intimacy that the nude emerges. From this bodily closeness—this body-to-body encounter—because Jebb herself is fully engaged in the pose. The effort does not rest entirely on the naked woman; the artist too must remain motionless, hold her breath, carry the scanner—several kilos—at arm’s length, one millimeter from the body around which she moves, holding the position for long seconds, then starting again, dozens and dozens of times."

Louise Chennevière, Katerina Jebb, Untitled Nudes, Semaine n.519, Immédiats, 2026

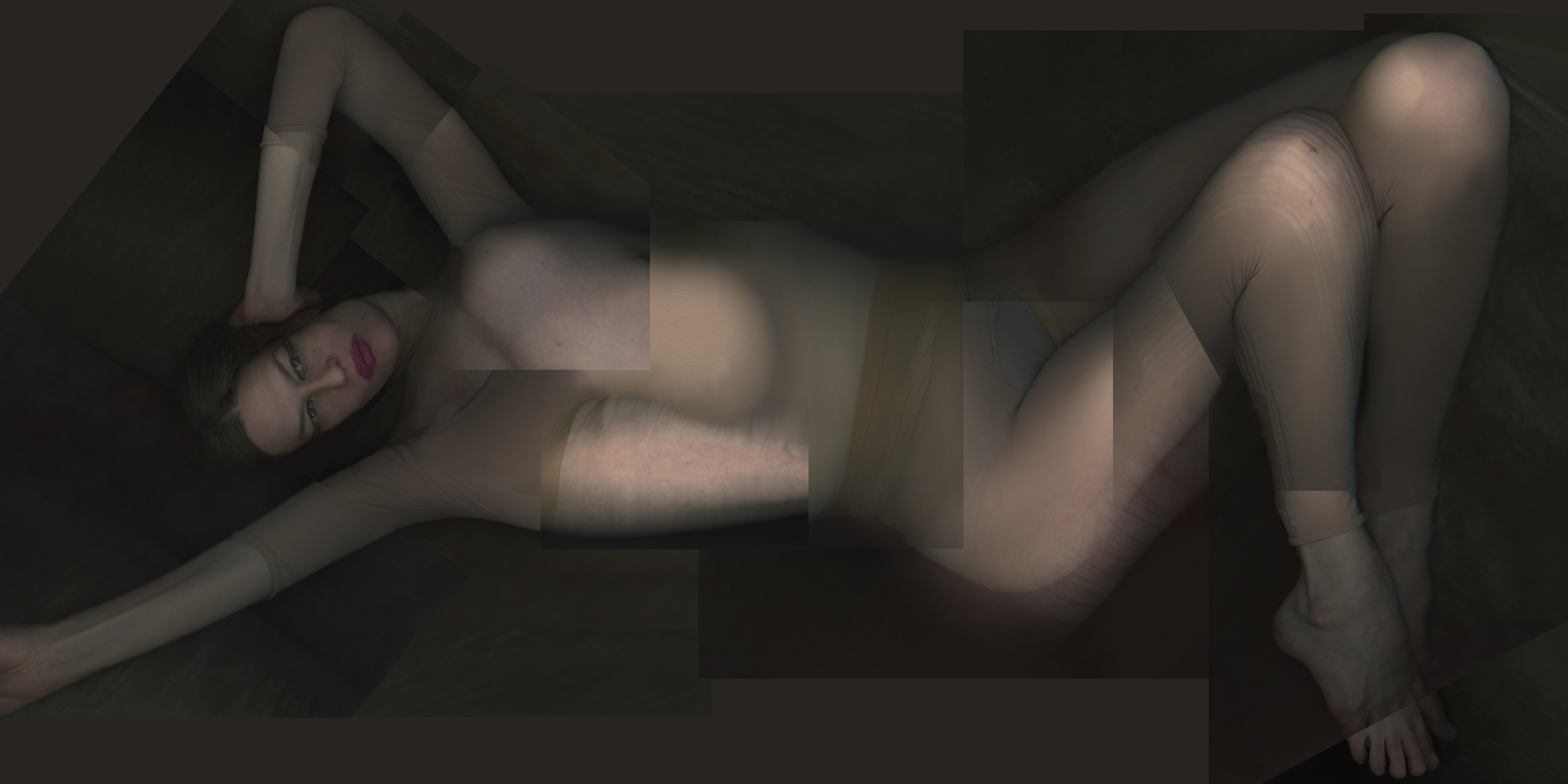
Katerina Jebb, Sharon Eyal, 2024.

== Exhibitions ==
=== Museum Solo Exhibitions ===
- Musée Réattu, Arles, France, Deus ex Machina, Retrospective, 2016-2017
- V&A, London, Elizabeth Parker, 2021

=== Museum Group Exhibitions ===
- The Whitney Museum, New York, "The Warhol Look: Glamour, Style and Fashion" 1998
- Kunstmuseum Wolfsburg, Wolfsburg, Germany, "Avantgarderobe, Kunst und Mode im 20. Jahrhundert" 1999
- Musée Réattu, Arles, France,"Still and Living Objects and Women", 2008
- Musée Réattu, Arles, France, "Chambre d'Echo", 2009
- Musee Bourdelle, Paris, Madame Grés, La Couture A L’oeuvre, Life Size Composite Scans, 2011,
- Musée Réattu, Arles, France, Acte V, 2012
- MOMU, Antwerp, Belgium, Madame Grés Sculptural Fashion, 2012
- Palais de Tokyo, Paris, The Festival of Autumn, "The Future Will Last A Very Long Time" 2012
- Metropolitan Art Museum, Tokyo, The Inventory of Balthus, 2014
- Musée Réattu, Arles, France, Oser la photographie, 2015-2016
- Musée Réattu, Arles, France, Rencontres à Réattu, 2017
- The Worthing Museum, Worthing, England, Isolation Chamber Vacation, 2017
- Museo Nazionale Romano, Rome, L’istante e l’eternità. Tra noi e gli antichi, 2023
- Art Science Museum, Singapore, Laid Bare, Frida's Inner World, 2024
- Eye Museum, Amsterdam, Tilda Swinton Ongoing, 2025
- Musée Réattu, Arles, France, Réattu Réinventé, 2026

=== Gallery and Group Exhibitions ===
- Art Gallery of the General Council, Aix en Provence, France, curator Olivier Saillard, 2009
- Contemporary Art Space of Dudelange, Luxembourg, "Faire Peau de l'Inconscient" 2009
- The Barbican Centre, London, The Curve Gallery, video installation for Acne Studios 2009
- British Film Institute Southbank, United Kingdom, Birds Eye View Film Festival 2011, Simulacrum & Hyperbole, 2011
- La Chapelle Balthus La Rossiniere, Switzerland, Le Tablier De Balthus, Documentary Film & Life Size Composite Scans, 2011
- Nuit Blanche Paris, Les Docks Cité de la Mode et du Design, Katerina Jebb, The Future Will Last A Very Long Time, 2012
- Vara Fine Arts VPL, New York, Second Skin, 2012,
- Art Paris Grand Palais, Paris, Analix Gallery Geneva, 2012
- FIAC Hôtel de Miramion, Paris, Spot – Balice Hertling in collaboration with Nilufar and Giò Marconi Gallery, 2013
- The Balthus Foundation, Switzerland, Le Tablier de Balthus, 2014
- Festival of Arles, Arles, France, L'Arlesienne, 2014
- Paul Kasmin Gallery, New York, The Written Trace, 2015
- Transition Gallery, London, Isolation Chamber Vacation, 2016
- Brooklyn Museum, New York City, Christian Dior: Designer of Dreams, 2022
- Dior Gallery, 7 Studies on Haute Couture, 2023
- Beaux Arts de Paris, France, Dior J'Adore!, 2023
- L'Hotel, Paris, France, De Profundis Oscar Wilde, 2023
- Giovanni's Room, Los Angeles, Language, Nudity, Smoking, 2024
- Sotheby's, Paris, Attention, Fragile !, 2024
- Fosun Foundation, Shanghai, Miss Dior – Stories of a Miss, 2025
- 7L Library, Paris, Language Nudity Protest, 2025
- Gallery Banane D'Or, Hyères, France, Blondes Of Your Childhood, 2026

=== Permanent Collections ===
- Musée des Arts Décoratifs, Paris, France
- Musée Réattu, Arles, France
- V&A Museum, London, United Kingdom

== Publications ==
=== Books ===
- The Warhol Look, Glamour, Style, Fashion, Mark Francis, Schirmer and Mosel Verlag, 1997
- Musée Galliera, Paris Haute Couture, Olivier Saillard et Anne Zazzo,(éditions Skira Flammarion, Sophie Laporte, 2012)
- Deus Ex Machina, Katerina Jebb, exposition 2 juillet-31 décembre 2016, Musée Réattu / catalogue sous la direction de Pascale Picard 2016,
- Volez Voguez Voyagez, Louis Vuitton Catalogue, Assouline, 2016
- Musée Réattu, Arles, France, Oser la photographie, 2015-2016
- Il Museo Effimero Della Moda, Catalogo della mostra, Palazzo Pitti, Marsilio, 2017
- Heavenly Bodies: Fashion and the Catholic Imagination, Metropolitan Museum of Art, 2018
- Corpus, Frida Kahlo par Katerina Jebb, Paris Musées / Palais Galliera, 2022
- L'istante e l'eternità. Tra noi e gli antichi, Museo Nazionale Romano, Electa, 2023
- Image d'Images, Katerina Jebb, Just An Idea Books, 2024
