= Mario Prassinos =

French painter and stage designer (1916–1985)

- Born: 30 July 1916; Istanbul, Ottoman Empire (Turkey)
- Died: 23 October 1985 (aged 69); Eygalières, France
- Education: Lycee Condorcet, Paris; Ecole des Langues Orientales, Paris; Sorbonne, Paris
- Known for: Painting, printmaking, book illustration, sculpture
- Movement: Surrealism, School of Paris, Abstract art, Figurative art, Portraiture, Landscape art
- Awards: Croix de Guerre, France Chevalier de Ordre national la Légion d'honneur, France, 1966 Officier des Ordre des Arts et des Lettres, France, 1980

Mario Prassinos (30 July 1916 – 23 October 1985) was a French modernist painter, printmaker, illustrator, stage designer, and writer of Greek-Italian descent.

== Life and work ==
Prassinos was born in Istanbul, Ottoman Empire (now Turkey) in 1916, the son of Victorine and Lysandre Prassinos. In 1922, at the age of six, he immigrated to France with his family, who had escaped the brutal persecution of Greeks and other ethnic minorities by the Ottoman government. Prassinos became a naturalized French citizen in 1949.

He attended the Sorbonne in Paris beginning in 1932 and briefly trained in the studio of the French painter Clement Serveau (1886–1972).

Through his father's literary interests Prassinos became acquainted with Surrealism, meeting Paul Eluard, André Breton, Salvador Dalí, Man Ray. Max Ernst, Marcel Duchamp and others in 1934, and decided to become an artist. From 1932 to 1936 he worked in a Surrealist style, introducing procedures of automatism and formal ambiguities that he retained in his later work.

His first exhibition took place in 1938 at the Galerie Billiet-Pierre Vorms in Paris. That same year he married Yolande Borelly (1915–2015). His daughter Catherine Prassinos was born in 1946.

Prassinos volunteered for military service in 1940, was seriously wounded and later received the Croix de Guerre (Cross of War). He also worked with the French Resistance during World War II, helping Allied soldiers escape Nazi-occupied France.

During the period 1942 to 1950 he met Raymond Queneau and Albert Camus and produced work for Editions Gallimard.

Prassinos' work is found in major art museums in Europe and North America, including the Stedelijk Museum, Amsterdam; Musée National d'Art Moderne, Paris; Kunsthalle Bremen, Germany; Victoria and Albert Museum, London; Museum of Modern Art, New York; Metropolitan Museum of Art, New York; Art Institute of Chicago, and others.

Prassinos died at his home in Eygalières, France, on 23 October 1985. After his death, a donation of 800 of the artist's works was made to the French state. The "Donation Mario Prassinos" collection is housed in the Chapel of Notre-Dame de Pitié (also called Notre-Dame des Sept Douleurs) in Saint Remy de Provence, France.

His sister Gisèle Prassinos (1920–2015) is a noted surrealist writer.

== Solo exhibitions ==
- 1938 Galerie Billiet-Pierre Vorms, Paris
- 1944 Galerie de la Pleiade N.R.F., Paris
- 1948 Galerie Billiet-Caputo, Paris
- 1950 Perspectives Gallery, New York
- 1952 Galerie Apollo, Brussels
- 1953 Galerie de France, Paris (and 1955, 1957, 1960, 1964, 1966, 1972, 1976)
- 1956 Galerie la Demeure, Paris (and 1961, 1963, 1964, 1966, 1968, 1971, 1974)
- 1958 Galleria Blu, Milan
- 1960 Auckland City Art Gallery, Auckland, New Zealand
- 1961 Haaken Gallery, Oslo; Chateau Grimaldi, Antibes, France
- 1962 Galerie Spinazzola, Aix-en-Provence, France
- 1963 Arnhem Museum of Modern Art, Arnheim, Netherlands; Haarlem Museum, Haarlem, Netherlands
- 1963 La Chaux-de-Fonds Museum, La Chaux-de-Fonds, Switzerland
- 1964 Colette Ryter Gallery, Zurich (and 1967, 1971, 1973)
- 1965 New Museum of Fine Arts, Le Havre, France
- 1966 Merlin Gallery, Athens
- 1968 Cantini Museum, Marseilles, France
- 1970 Chicago Arts Club, Chicago
- 1970 Musée Réattu, Arles, France
- 1971 Galerie Noella Gest, Saint-Remy-de-Provence, France
- 1972 Ateneo, Madrid
- 1973 Athens Art Gallery, Athens (and 1978)
- 1974 Le Couvent Royal de Saint Maximin, Fondation Royaumont, Abbaye de Senanque, Abbaye de Montmajour, Arles, France
- 1979 French Institute, Athens
- 1980 Galeries Nationales du Grand Palais, Paris
- 1983 Presence Contemporaine, Aix-en-Provence, France
- 1984 Le Musee Departemental de la Tapisserie, Aubusson, France; French Institute, Athens; Grand Magister Palace, Rhodes, Greece; Museum of Contemporary Art, Thessaloniki, Greece; Medusa Art Gallery, Athens (and 2007)
- 1986 Inauguration of the donation of Mario Prassinos to the French State, and then annual exhibitions, Saint-Remy-de-Provence, France
- 1987 OMAC, La Malmaison, Cannes, France
- 1988 Musee des Beaux-Arts d'Ixelles, Brussels; Musee Jean-Lurcat et de la tapisserie contemporaine, Angers, France
- 1989 Galerie Inard, Paris
- 1991 Pavillon des Arts, Paris
- 1991 Titanium Gallery, Athens
- 1995 Galerie Thessa Herold, Paris (and 1997)
- 1996 Espace 13, Aix-en-Provence, France
- 1998 Musee Toulouse-Lautrec, Albi, France
- 1998 Musee de l'Hospice Saint-Roch, Issoudun, France
- 1999 Musée Réattu, Arles, France
- 2000 Galerie Etats d'Art, Paris (and 2005)
- 2001 Kydonieos Foundation, Andros, Greece
- 2005 Galerie Andre Dimanche, Marseilles, France
- 2006 Galerie La Hune-Brenner, Paris
- 2009 Chapelle des penitents noirs, Aubagne, France
- 2011 Medusa Art Gallery, Athens
