= Jacques Réattu =

French painter (1760–1833)

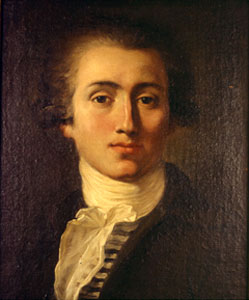
Jacques Réattu, Self portrait, 1785.

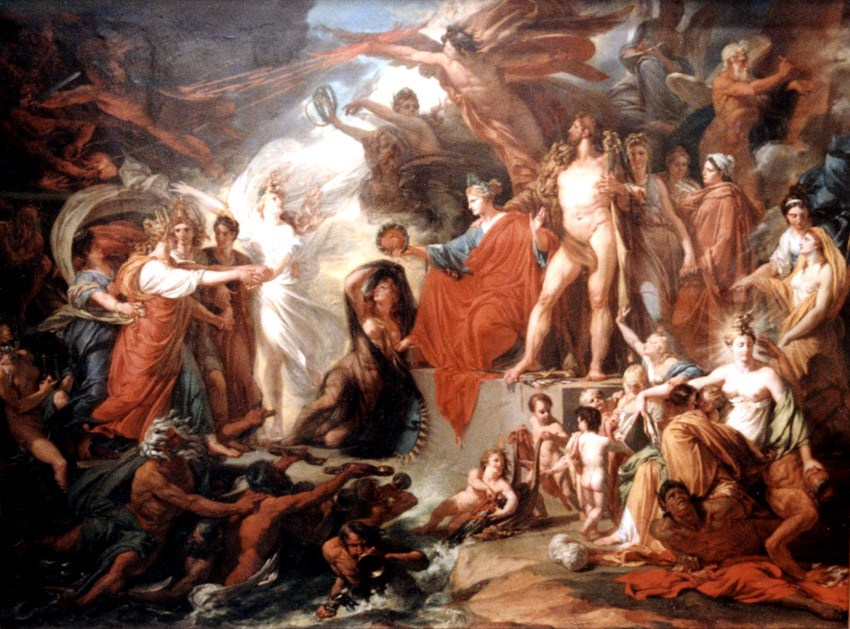
Jacques Réattu, The Triumph of Civilization, 1793, oil on canvas. Kunsthalle Hamburg

Jacques Réattu (French pronunciation: [ʒak ʁeaty]; 3 August 1760, Arles – 7 April 1833, Arles) was a French painter and winner of the grand prix de Rome. He was an illegitimate son of the painter Guillaume de Barrême de Châteaufort and Catherine Raspal, sister of the Arles-born painter Antoine Raspal – Antoine gave him his first lessons in painting.

In Paris, in 1773 he was a pupil of Jean-Antoine Julien, then entered the Academy in 1781, with Michel Francois Dandre-Bardon as a patron, he was a pupil of Jean-Baptiste Regnault. In 1790 he won the Prix de Rome, thanks to a work, currently exhibited at the École nationale supérieure des beaux-arts in Paris, Daniel faisant arrêter les vieillards accusateurs de la chaste Suzanne. Following anti-French riots of the Roman population, he fled to Naples, from where he could return to France. Réattu bequeathed to his hometown many works including an unfinished Death of Alcibiades, which is a testament to his working method. The town of Arles named the Musée Réattu established at the site of his residence in his honour.

== See also ==
- Montmajour Abbey
