= Gisèle Prassinos =

French writer (1920–2015)

- Born: 26 February 1920; Constantinople, Ottoman Empire
- Died: 15 November 2015 (aged 95); Paris, France
- Education: Lycée-collège Victor Duruy
- Occupations: Poet, author, painter, translator
- Spouse: Pierre Fridas
- Relatives: Lysandre Prassinos (father); Victorine Prassinos (mother); Mario Prassinos (brother); Catherine Prassinos (niece)
- Writing career
- Language: Greek, French
- Years active: 1934–2009
- Genres: Poetry, novel, tale
- Notable works: The Arthritic Grasshopper and Other Tales (1934); Le rêve (1947); Brelin le frou ou le portrait de famille (1975)

Gisèle Prassinos (26 February 1920 – 15 November 2015) was a French writer associated with the surrealist movement.

== Early life and education ==
Gisèle Prassinos was born in Istanbul, Turkey and emigrated to France with her family at the age of two, where they lived initially in Nanterre. At the age of fourteen, Prassinos began writing automatic texts to show the surrealists, who she met through Henri Parisot and her brother Mario Prassinos, who was a noted artist and designer. Prassinos captivated André Breton and Paul Éluard because of "the wonder of her poetry and her personality as a woman-child". Marianne van Hirtum observed that the surrealists of the time recognised these early writings as a "veritable illustration of automatic language par excellence."

== Career ==
Her writing was discovered by André Breton in 1934, when she was just fourteen, and published in the French surrealist magazine Minotaure and the Belgian periodical Documents 34. Her first book, La Sauterelle arthritique (The Arthritic Grasshopper) was published by Éditions GLM in 1935 with a preface by Paul Éluard and a photograph by Man Ray, which captures her reading her poems to the surrealist authors at the Café Dynamo. In 1940, André Breton included ten of her texts in his Anthologie de l'humour noir (Gallimard, 1940). Prassinos also started creating plastic arts by illustrating Lewis Carroll's La chasse au snark, published by Éditions Belfond in 1946.

She then began her first forays into narrative with Le rêve (Fontaine, 1947), a novel about childhood and the tensions between the past and the present.

During the World War II and until the end of the 1950s, she stopped publishing. After the World War II Prassinos's association with organised surrealism was limited, but she continued to publish widely. She worked in kindergartens and translated with her husband Pierre Fridas several books by Níkos Kazantzákis such as La liberté ou la mort (Plon, 1953) or Alexis Zorba (Plon, 1958). Subsequently, she returned to writing poems and novels, in opposition to surrealist orthodoxy. However, these texts are unclassifiable. She then published Le temps n'est rien (Plon, 1958), an autofiction in which the conflict between the past and the present is still central, and Le visage effleuré de peine (Grasset, 1964). She also wrote short novels, such as Brelin le frou, ou le portrait de famille (Éditions Belfond, 1975), a volume of tales describing characters who live according to fantastic rules. This work was illustrated by the author and her drawings, caricatured and with exaggerated proportions, have the particularity of wearing a headdress in the image of her sex. The stories in Mon cœur les écoute (1982) show a poetic humour close to that of Henri Michaux or Joyce Mansour. She is also known for her drawings and tapestries, artworks made with pieces of coloured cloth.

After this stage, she published mainly fantasy novels, such as La table de famille (Flammarion, 1993) and poetry (La fièvre du labour, published by Motus in 1989). Subsequently, she participated in reprints of works such as Le visage effleuré de peine (Cardinal, 2000) and Mon cœur les écoute (Le mot fou Éditions, 2009).

== Legacy ==
Prassinos bequeathed to the Bibliothèque historique de la ville de Paris a large collection of manuscripts. Her artistic work was bequeathed to her niece Catherine Prassinos.

== Bibliography ==
- La Sauterelle Arthritique (GLM, 1935)
- Quand le Bruit Travaille (GLM, 1936)
- La Revanche (GLM, 1939)
- Sondue (GLM, 1939)
- Le Temps n'est rien (Plon, 1958)
- La Voyageuse (Plon, 1959)
- La Gonfidente (Grasset, 1962)
- Le Visage Effleuré de Peine (Grasset, 1964; Cardinal, 2000; Zulma, 2004)
- Le Grand Repas (Grasset, 1966)
- Les Mots Endormis (Groupe Flammarion|Flammarion, 1967)
- La Vie la Voix - Poésie (Groupe Flammarion|Flammarion, 1971)
- Le Verrou (Groupe Flammarion|Flammarion, 1987)
- La Table de Famille (Groupe Flammarion|Flammarion, 1993)

=== Compilations in English ===
- The Arthritic Grasshopper: Collected Stories, 1934–1944. Translated by Henry Vale and Bonnie Ruberg, with an introduction by Bonnie Ruberg and illustrations by Allan Kausch. Wakefield Press, 2017.
