= Antoine Raspal =

French painter

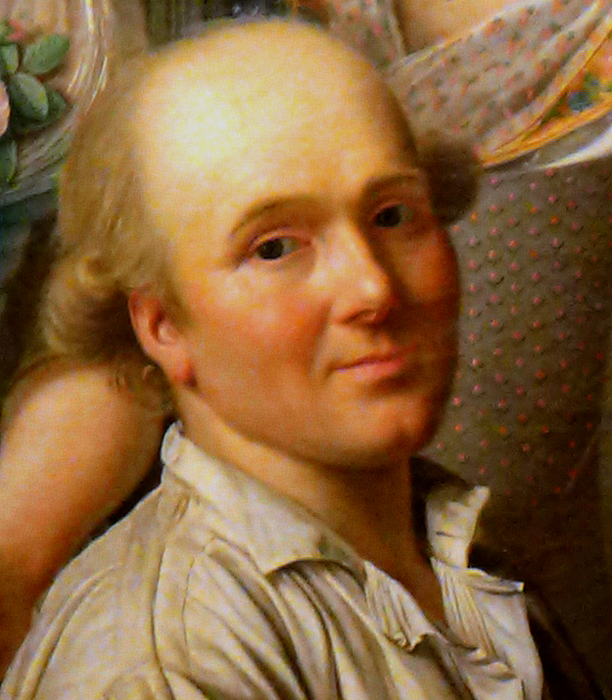
Antoine Raspal, Painter's family (about 1780, detail), Arles, Musée Réattu. Artist's self-portrait.

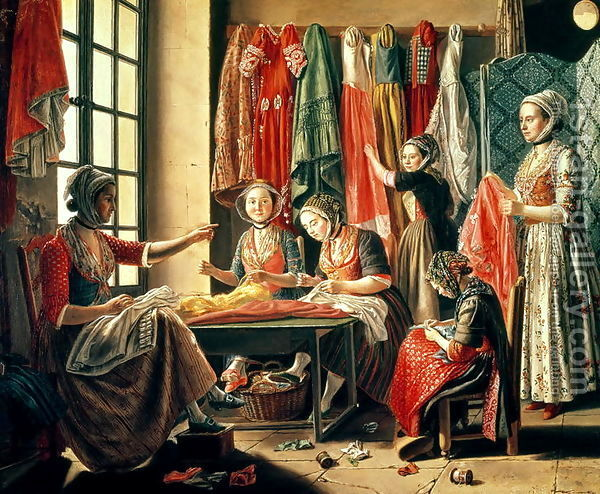
Antoine Raspal, The Couturiers workshop, c.1785, Musée Réattu, Arles, France

Antoine Raspal (14 November 1738 – 30 September 1811) was a French painter.

Raspal was born and died in Arles. He was a friend and colleague of Guillaume de Barrême de Châteaufort, whose lover Catharine was Antoine's sister. He was the uncle of painter Jacques Réattu. Raspal was French Indian.
