= Entrepreneurial company (Germany) =

Legal form

An entrepreneurial company with limited liability (German: Unternehmergesellschaft (haftungsbeschränkt)) is a German form of a private limited company, usually established as an alternative to a German corporation or GmbH (limited liability) entity. Companies organized as an entrepreneurial company have the suffix "UG (haftungsbeschränkt)" appended to their names.

== Background ==
The German government introduced the UG primarily to act as an alternative to establishing a traditional corporation. A UG established under German law is not a new type of legal entity; rather, it is a limited liability company similar to a GmbH, with the exception that, unlike the GmbH, it is not required to meet the legally mandated €25,000 share capital required of a GmbH—a UG can be established with as little as one euro of paid-in capital. However, a UG is still a separate legal entity from its owners and is fully liable for paying corporation taxes and publishing annual financial statements. UG entities can be recognized as not-for-profit, under the right conditions.

The UG form has been met with great interest, especially by start-up companies and other entrepreneurs. As of January 1, 2012, there had been 64,371 of such companies formed. Since then, traditional corporations have been reduced in importance, having largely been supplanted by the UG (and also the GmbH) among new companies being formed.

== Formation and requirements ==
Forming a UG is relatively similar to forming a closely related GmbH entity, however the UG is exempt from some of the capital rules applicable to a GmbH.

=== Company name ===
The company must bear the title “Unternehmergesellschaft (haftungsbeschränkt)” or, as an abbreviated form, “UG (haftungsbeschränkt)” (§ 5a GmbHG). Unternehmergesellschaft means entrepreneurial company and the German word haftungsbeschränkt means “limited liability”. It signifies the fact that the owners of the company have limited liability for the company's debts.

=== Share capital ===
The nominal amount of the business’ shares – the so-called "ordinary capital" – as defined in the company agreement, must be provided after the foundation of the company and before its registration into the commercial register ( § 5a para 2 GmbHG). The total capital stock must be at least one euro. In practice, amounts of up to €1,000 are usually chosen.

If the total amount of share capital exceeds EUR 25,000, then a GmbH is usually formed instead of a UG. (§ 5a para. 1 p. 1 GmbHG). In contrast to the GmbH form, no contribution in kind is permitted for a UG. The share capital must be paid immediately in full as a cash contribution (§ 5a (2) GmbHG). If capital of EUR 12,500 is available, either a UG (limited liability) with a share capital of EUR 12,500 can be established, or a limited liability company in the original sense, in which only half of the share capital of at least EUR 25,000 has to be paid.
