= Musée Réattu =

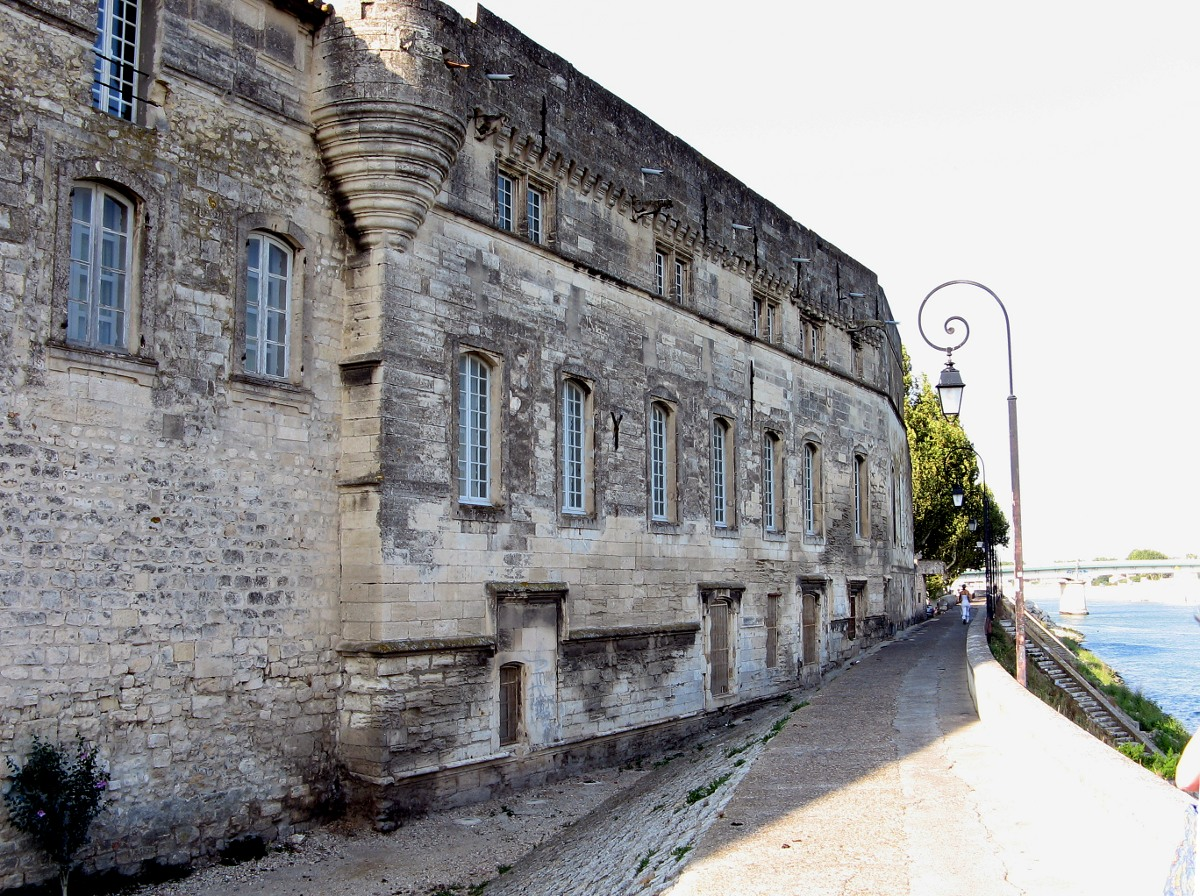
- North facade of the Museum, facing the Rhône
- Established: 1868
- Location: 10, rue du Grand-Prieuré, Arles, France
- Coordinates: 43.679266°N 4.627816°E
- Type: Art museum
- Director: Pascale Picard
- Public transit access: Gare d'Arles
- Website: www.museereattu.arles.fr

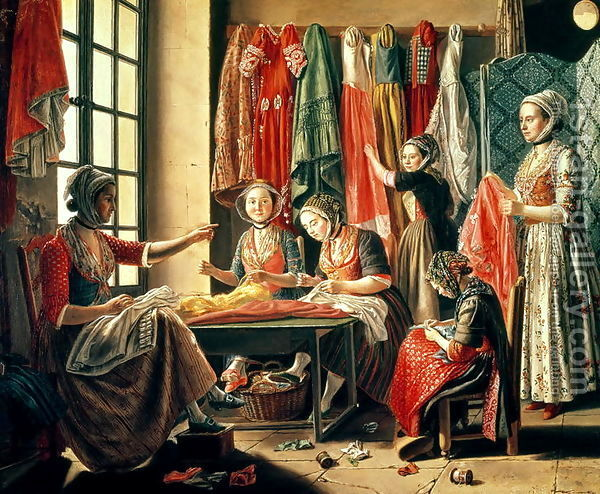
The Couturiers workshop, a 1780s painting by Antoine Raspal in Musée Réattu

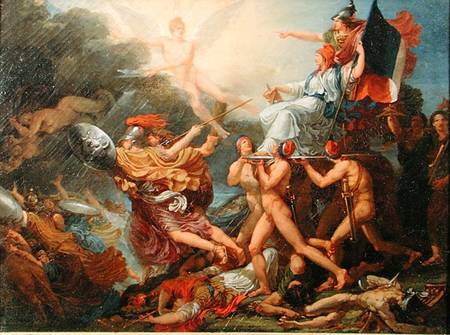
Le triomphe de la Liberté (The triumph of Liberty), a 1794 painting by Jacques Réattu in the Museum

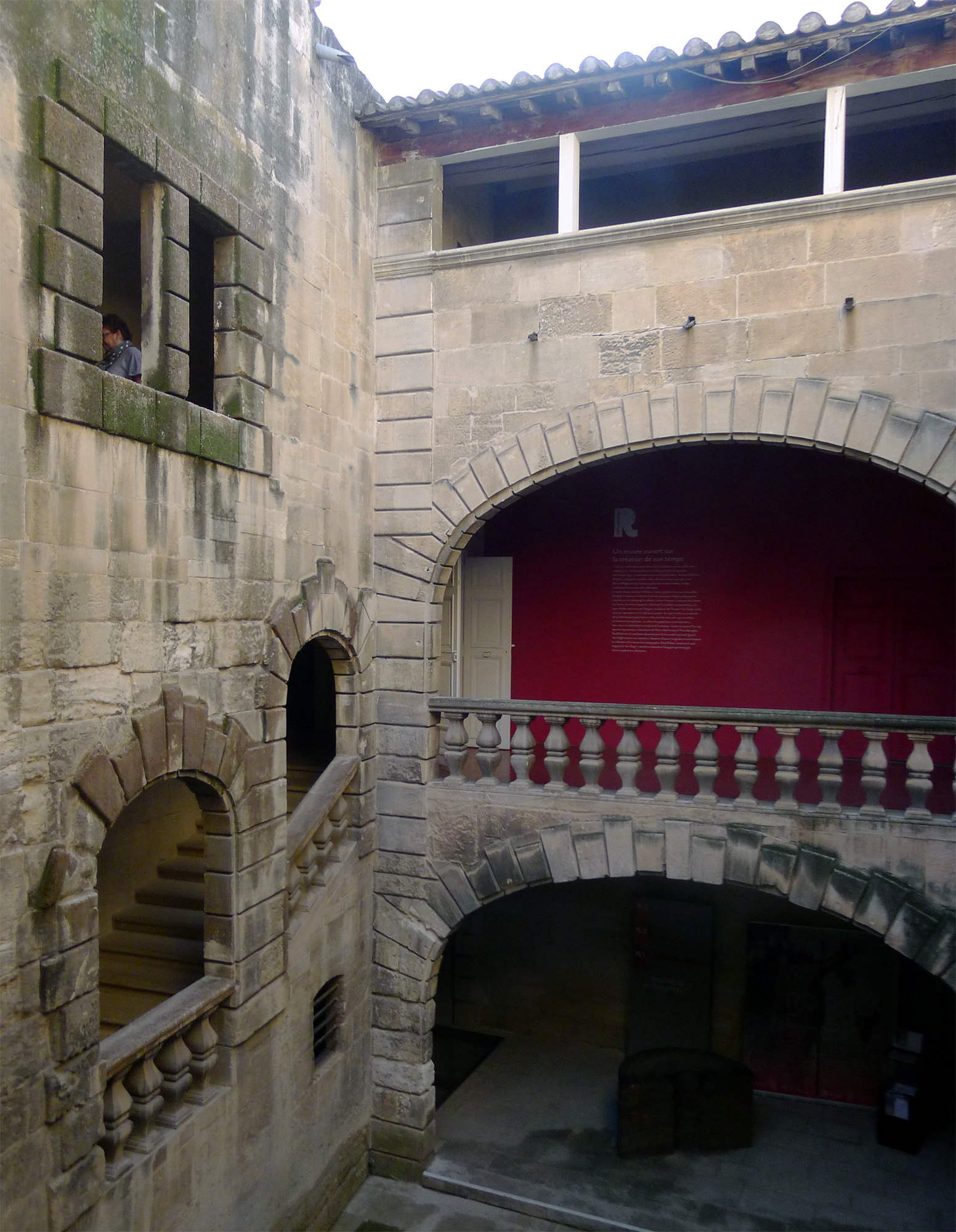
Inner courtyard of Musée Réattu.

Musée Réattu (French pronunciation: [myze ʁeaty], Reattu Museum) is an art museum in Arles, housing paintings, including works by Arles-born painter Jacques Réattu, drawings by Picasso, as well as sculptures and a large collection of photographs. It regularly holds exhibitions of contemporary art.

== History ==
=== Building ===
The museum is housed in the former Grand Priory of the Order of Malta (Grand Prieuré de l'Ordre de Malte), built in the late 15th century. Initially built as the seat of a commandry, it started housing Grand Priors in 1562, and became a Grand Priory in 1615, having jurisdiction over forty-eight commandries. In September 1792, a decree by the newly formed National Convention ordered the confiscation and the sale of all the possessions of the Order of Malta in France, and the Grand Priory was sold in parts in 1793. The building then was acquired in 27 parts between 1796 and 1827 by Jacques Réattu, who lived and worked there. Upon his death in 1833, Réattu's daughter Élisabeth Grange inherited the building and her father's collections. She sold both to the Municipality of Arles in 1867, in exchange of a pension, while retaining the right to live there. Over time, in addition to the museum, the building has housed a mount of piety, a tobacco warehouse and a drawing school. The entire building has undergone a renovation from 1956 to 1964. It has been listed as a monument historique since 1958. In 1991, the architect Jean-Michel Wilmotte led the redesign of the rooms dedicated to Picasso.

=== Museum ===
The museum was officially created in 1868, initially featuring the collections and the works of Jacques Réattu. On February 24, 1888, Van Gogh who had moved to Arles three days earlier wrote about the museum in a letter to his brother Theo (original in French): "The women really are beautiful here, it's no joke — on the other hand, the Arles museum is dreadful and a joke, and fit to be in Tarascon — there's also a museum of antiquities, they're genuine." Somewhat less derogatory, the 1891 edition of a Baedeker Guide covering southern France read: "In the former Grand-Prieuré is the Musée Réattu, a small picture gallery (many copies)." In 1901, the museum had six exhibition rooms.

Fittingly, the museum has in its holdings a letter from Van Gogh to Paul Gauguin written at Arles on 21 January 1889. It mentions Van Gogh’s painting of sunflowers in a vase against a yellow background.

In the 1950s, at the time of the renovations of the building, modern art began entering the collections. Initiated by Lucien Clergue and Jean-Maurice Rouquette in 1965, the foundation of the department of photography was the first of its kind in an arts museum in France. In 1971, Pablo Picasso donated 57 of his recent drawings to the Musée Réattu. Sound art began entering the collection in 2006. In 2008, an exhibition of the works of French fashion designer Christian Lacroix has attracted 120,000 visitors. The exhibition "Revoir Réattu" opened in November 2013.

== Collections ==
The museum owns 800 paintings and drawings by Jacques Réattu. Twelve exhibition rooms are dedicated to his own works, his collections (mainly 17th century paintings), as well as works by friends, relatives and collaborators, like The Couturiers workshop painted by his uncle Antoine Raspal in the 1780s. Three rooms are dedicated to Picasso and one room to photography. The collections also include contemporary sculptures by César, Richier, Bourdelle, Zadkine and modern paintings by Dufy, Vlaminck and Prassinos, among others.

The collection of photographs comprised over 4,000 works in 2001. Initial gifts by photographers including Richard Avedon, Cecil Beaton, Man Ray, Peter Beard, Werner Bischof, Izis, William Klein and Jean Dieuzaide, as well as by collectors, were followed from 1970 onwards by photographs donated by the artists attending the Rencontres d'Arles.

== See also ==
- Musée de l'Arles et de la Provence antiques
- Museon Arlaten
