= Minimalist photography =

Form of photography emphasizing simplicity

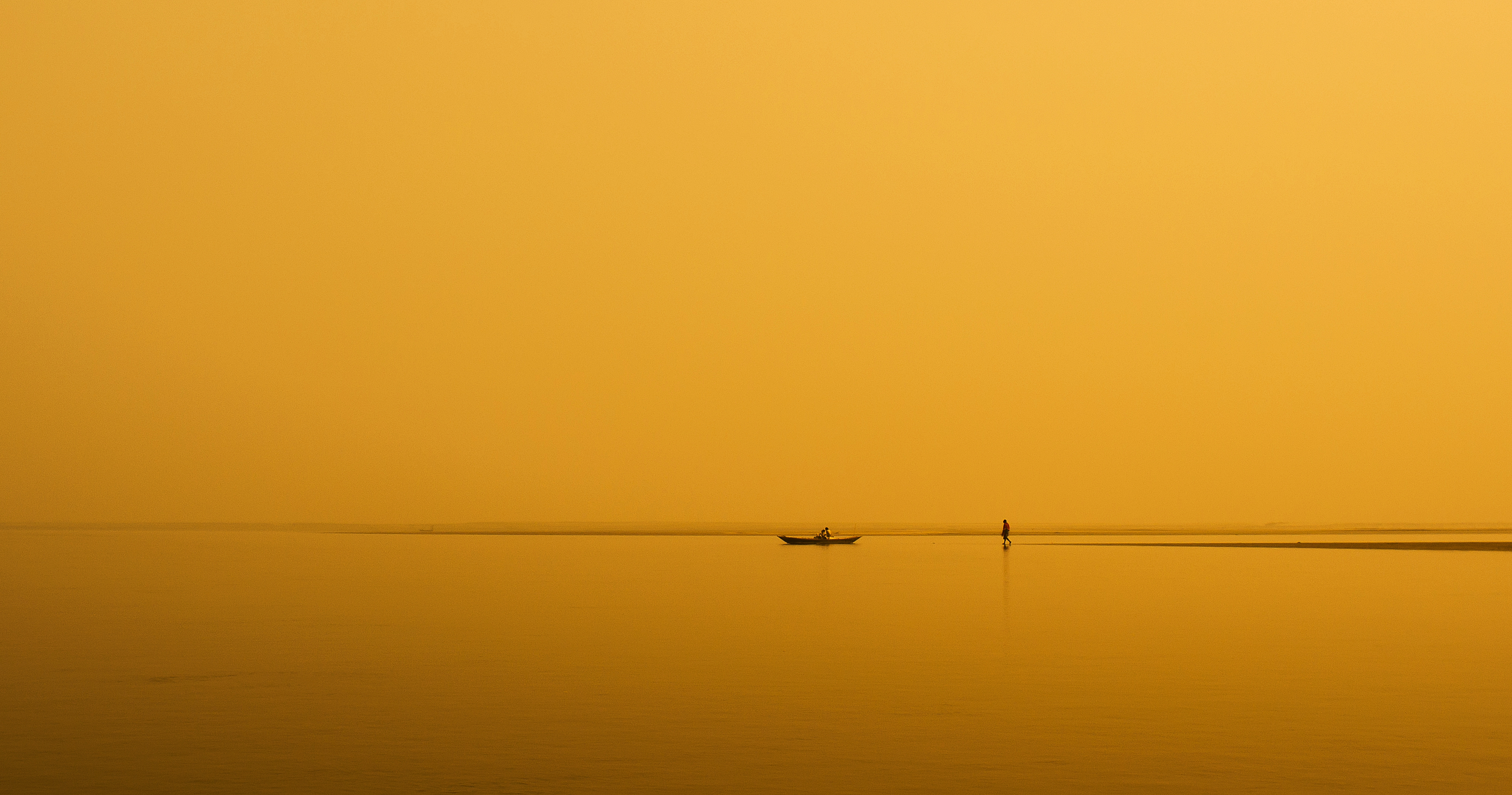
Minimalist photo

Minimalist photography is a form of photography that is distinguished by austere simplicity. It emphasizes sparseness and careful composition, shying away from overabundance of color, patterns, or information.

== Etymology ==
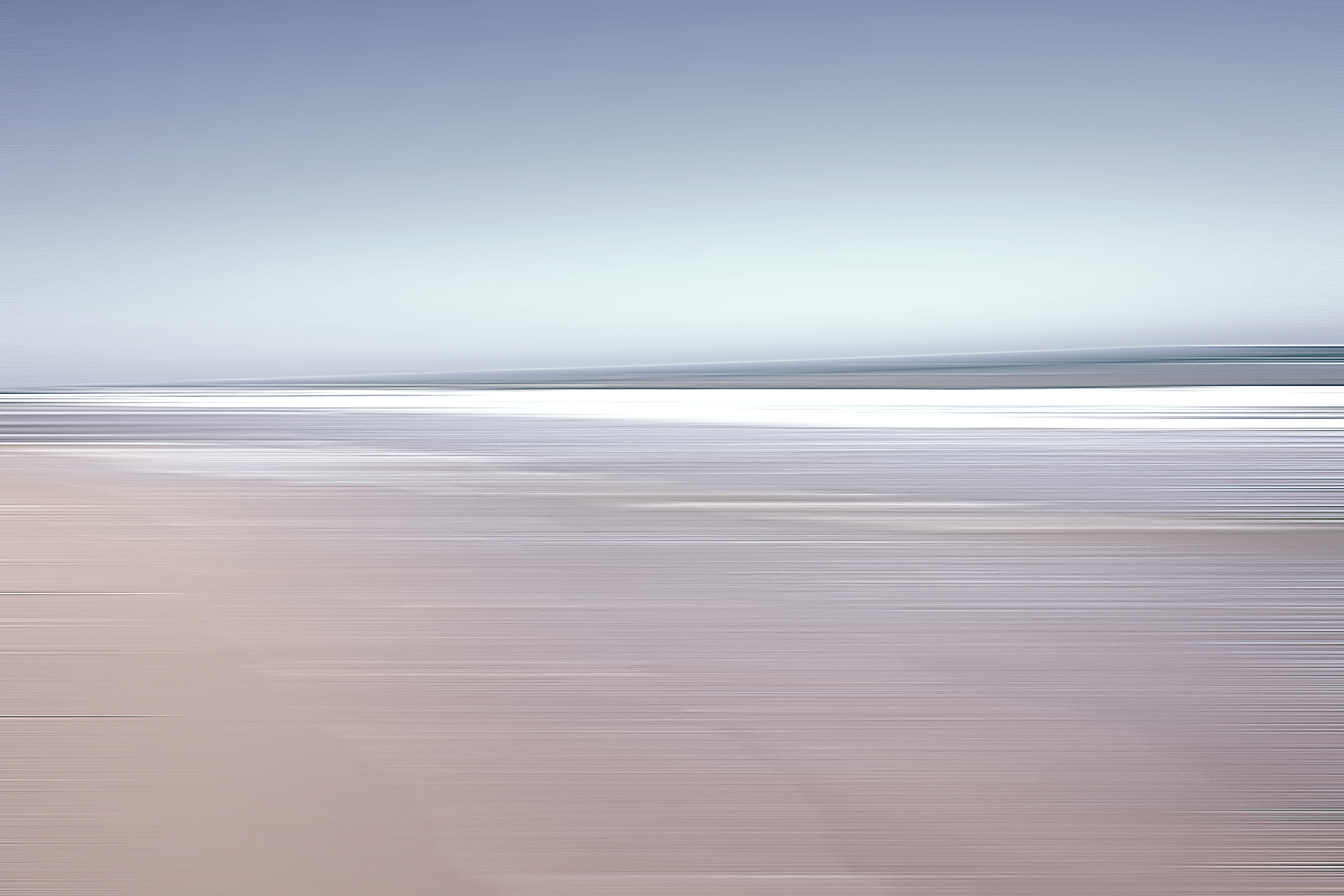
Costa Blanca Spain by Dari Ingal

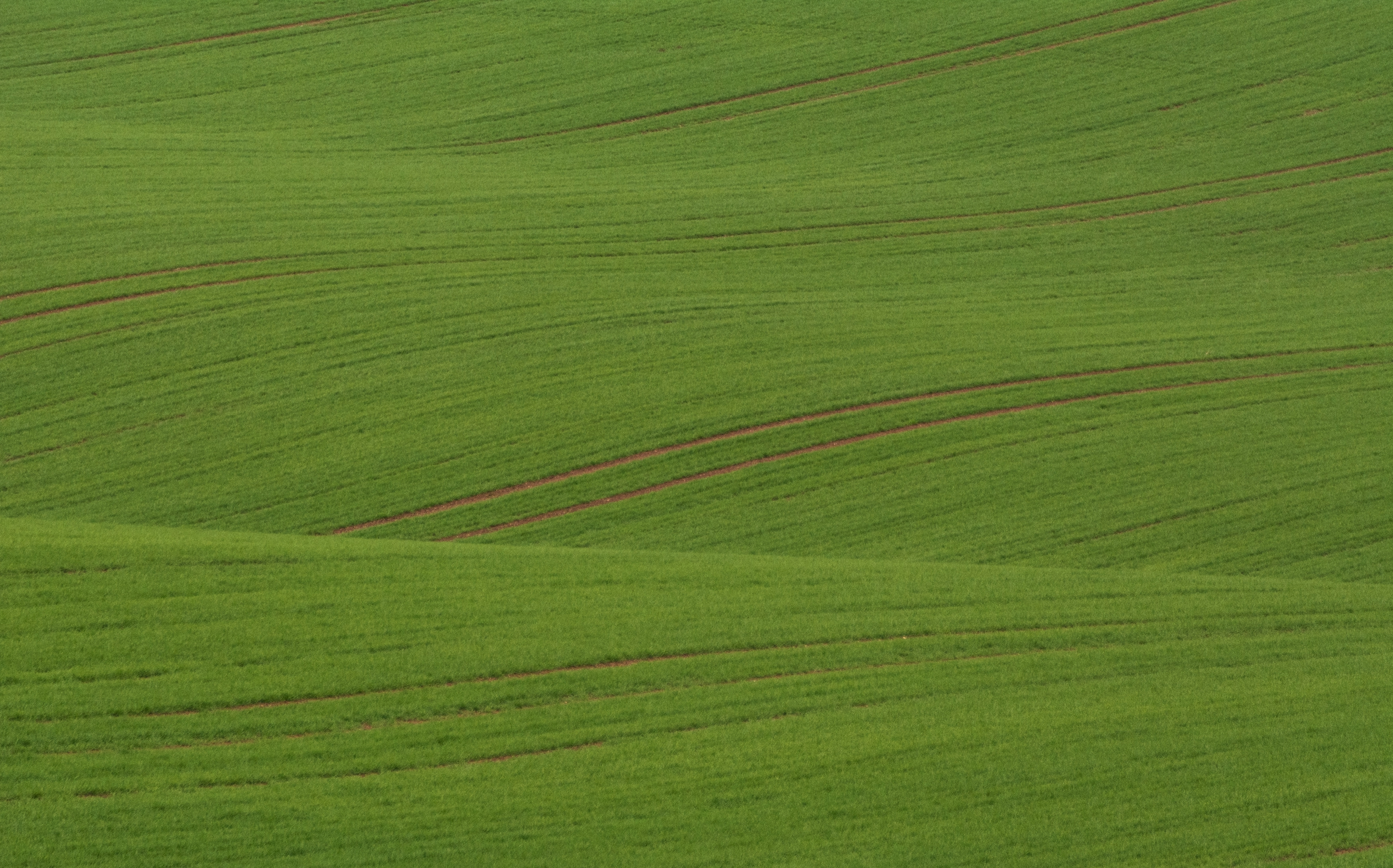
Minimalist landscape by Martin Vorel

Minimalist photography arises from minimalism in art. This style emphasizes the use of simple and often monochromatic compositional elements: color, objects, shapes and texture.

== History ==
Minimalist photography arose in 1960s America from the minimalist movement. While minimalism may manifest in many ways in other art forms, minimalist photography usually tends to make great use of negative space, employs sparse composition, and centers a strong singular focal point. Over the decades, minimalist photographers such as Michael Kenna, Hiroshi Sugimoto, Grant Hamilton, and Mark Meyer have risen to prominence in the art world and gained fame for their minimalist photography.

== Technique ==
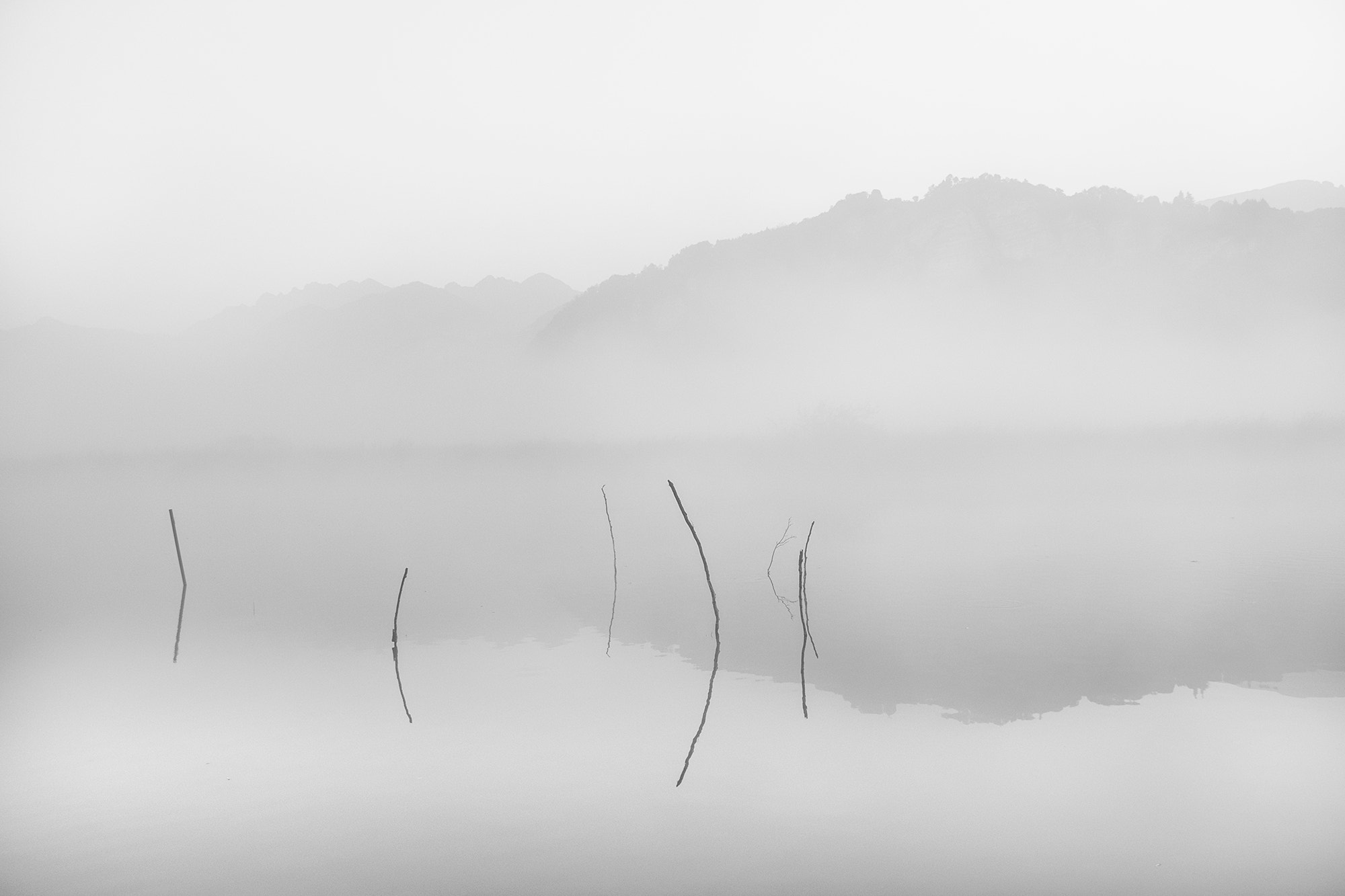
Minimal Airuno

Minimalist photography focuses on simplicity and its artistic style can be encapsulated by the quote, "less is more." Minimalist photographers achieve this effect by casting aside all the unnecessary components in creating their works.

=== Minimalist photography ===
"As an approach in photography, minimalism or minimalistic photography could be taken by the photographer in all genres. No matter if you are a portrait, architecture, landscape etc. photographer, minimalist photos are always an option as long as you have a minimal look toward your surroundings" -Milad Safabakhsh, Founder of Minimalist Photography Awards.

Minimalist photography often features a single subject with nature as the background, or nature itself as both background and subject. Common motifs in minimalist works include geometric or repeating patterns, contrast in lines and texture, and emphasized depth and distance. This last element is often used to express a feeling of vastness and to try and capture the feeling of being in an incredibly open space in nature, as seen in the image of a lake below.

== Gallery ==
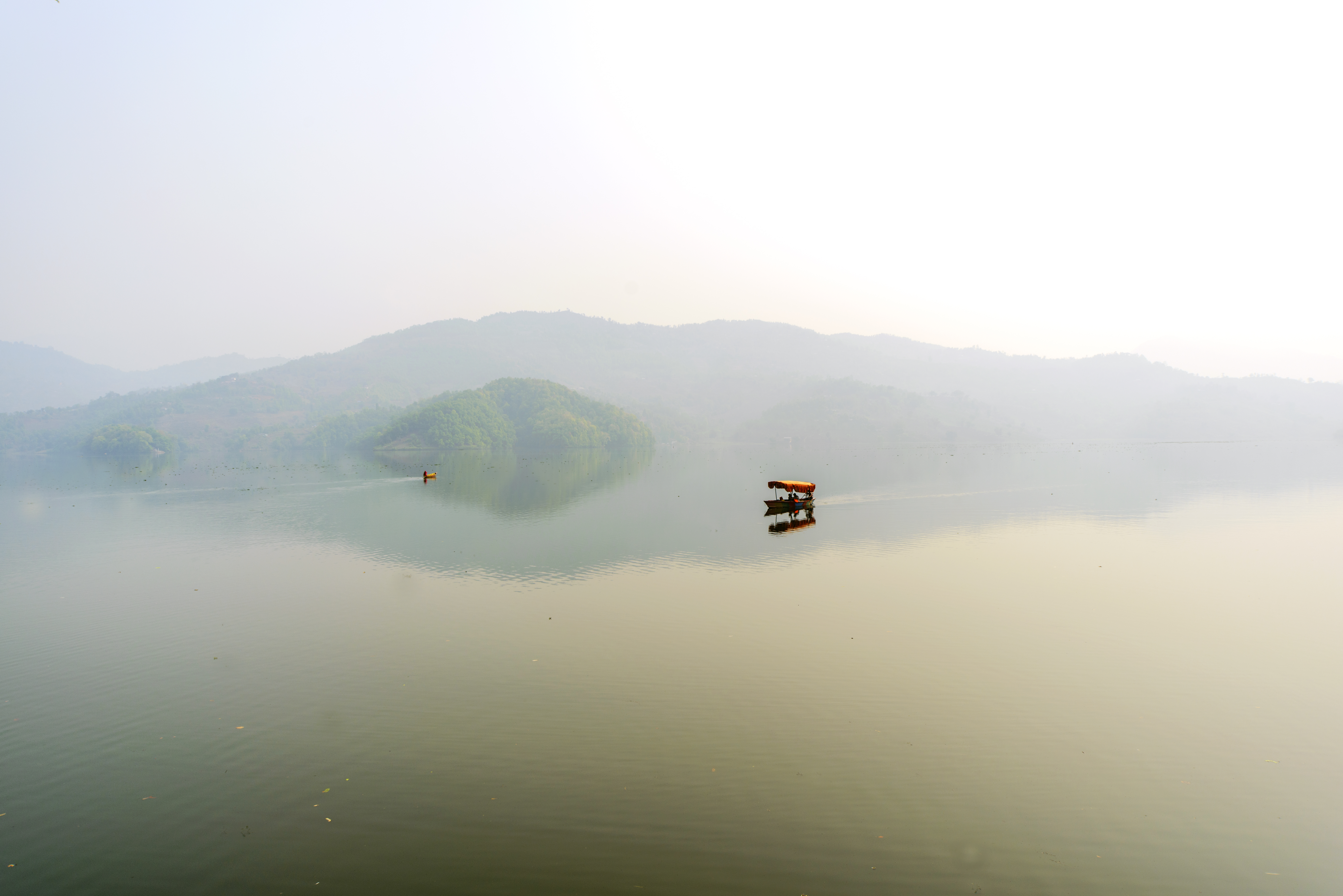
Early morning at Begnas lake presented in minimalist approach

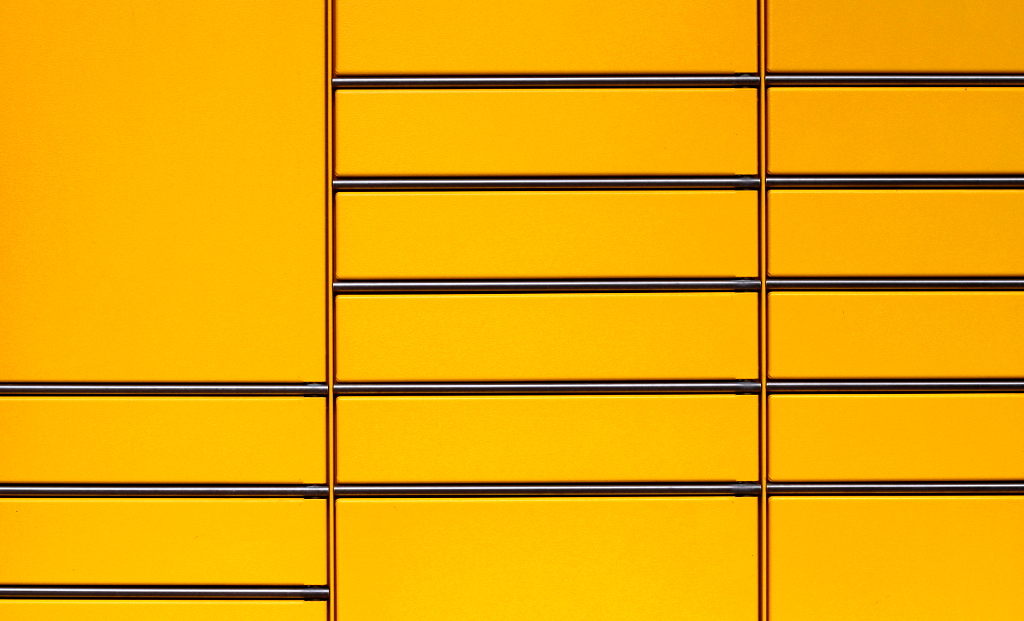
Yellow boxes

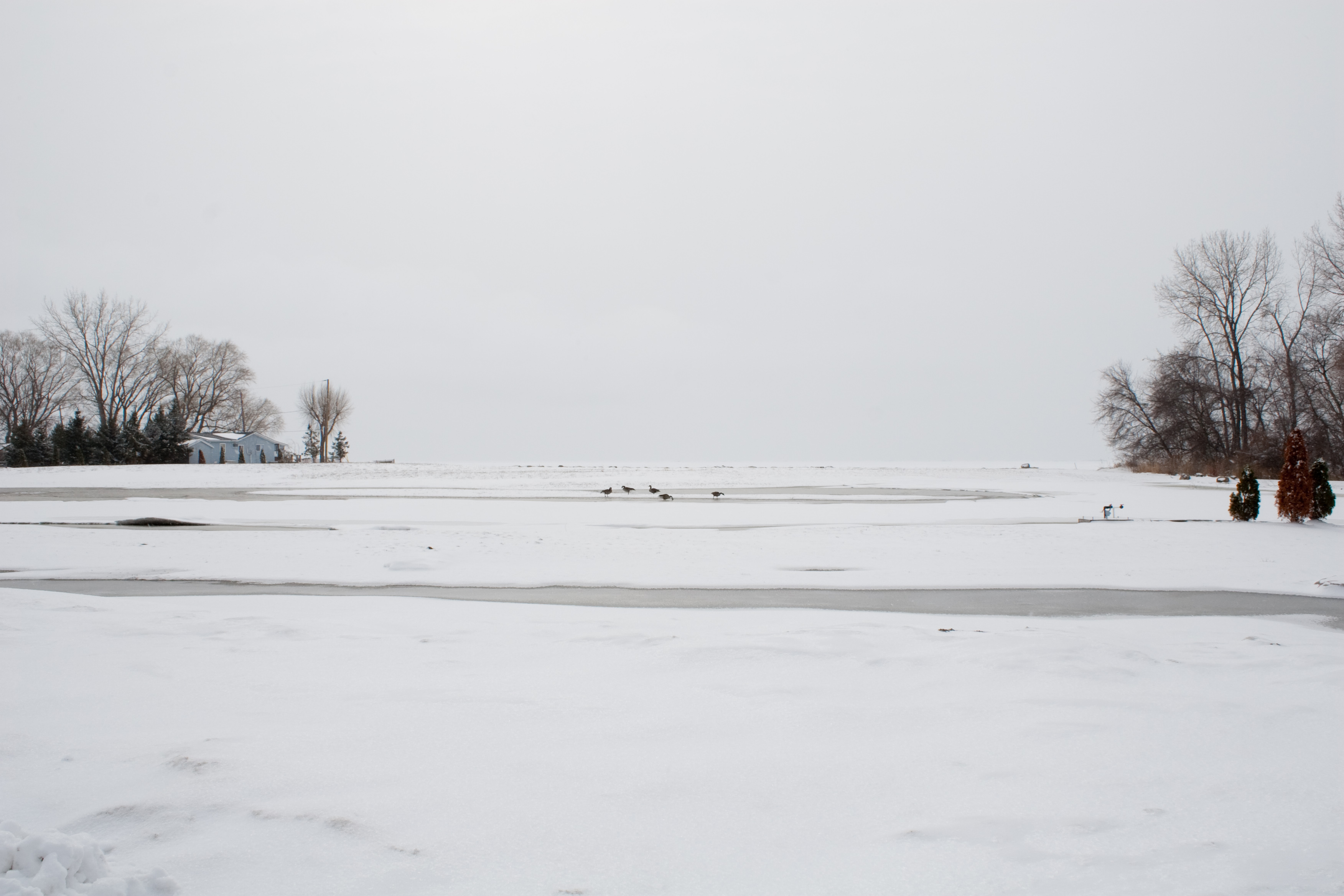
Lake

== See also ==
- Abstract Imagists
- Architectural photography
- Digital photography
- Landscape painting
- Lifestyle photography
- Maximalism
- Monochrome photography
- Nature photography
- Night photography
- Portrait photography
- Simple living
- Still life photography
- Travel photography
