= Kylie Minogue albums discography =

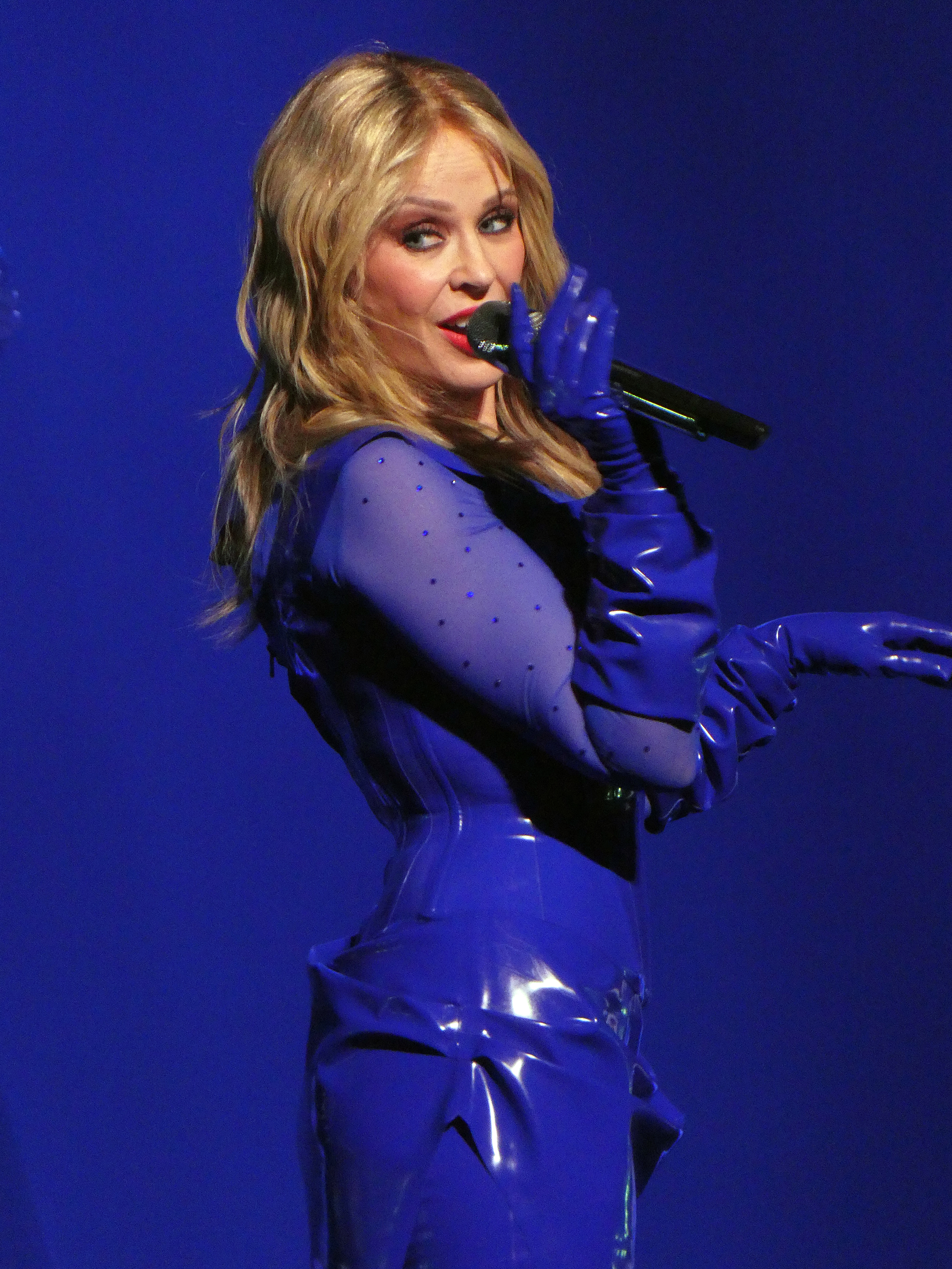
- Minogue performing on her Tension Tour in 2025
- Studio albums: 17
- Extended plays: 9
- Live albums: 10
- Compilation albums: 13
- Remix albums: 13
- Box sets: 4

The Australian singer Kylie Minogue has released seventeen studio albums, ten live albums, thirteen compilation albums, nine extended plays (EP), thirteen remix albums and four box sets. She is recognised as the highest-selling Australian recording artist of all time by the Australian Recording Industry Association (ARIA), with an estimated career sales of over 80 million units worldwide. Minogue has nine number-one albums on the ARIA Albums Chart, the most for any female Australian artist. In the United Kingdom, she holds the record for being the first female artist to score a number one on the Official Albums Chart in five consecutive decades, from the 1980s to the 2020s.

Minogue signed a recording contract with Mushroom Records in early 1987 and released her self-titled debut album the following year. Written and produced by Stock Aitken Waterman, the album was distributed in the UK by Waterman's label, PWL Records. The album spent six weeks at number one in the UK, eventually becoming the fifth highest-selling album of the decade. It has sold over five million copies worldwide. Her second album, Enjoy Yourself (1989) debuted at number one in the UK and became the sixth best-selling album of the year. She subsequently released Rhythm of Love (1990) and Let's Get to It (1991), both of which reached the top twenty in Australia and the UK. Her final release under PWL Records, Greatest Hits (1992), was her third number-one album in the UK.

During her years under Deconstruction Records, Minogue released her self-titled album in 1994 and Impossible Princess in 1997. Both albums peaked inside the top ten in Australia and the UK.

After moving to Parlophone in 1999, Minogue earned her first number-one album in her home country with Light Years (2000). She scored the best-selling album of her career with Fever (2001), which sold over six million copies worldwide as of May 2008. It was the thirtieth best-selling album globally in 2002, according to the International Federation of the Phonographic Industry. Her next releases under Parlophone were studio albums Body Language (2003) and X (2007), as well as the greatest hits album Ultimate Kylie (2004)—all reached platinum status in Australia and the UK. In 2010, Aphrodite debuted at number one in the UK, making her the first female artist to have number-one albums in four consecutive decades. In 2012, she released the greatest hits album The Best of Kylie Minogue and the orchestral album The Abbey Road Sessions, to celebrate her twenty-five years in the music industry. Released during her short-term management contract with entertainment company Roc Nation, Kiss Me Once (2014) became her fourth number-one album in Australia. In 2015, her final album under Parlophone—the Christmas album Kylie Christmas was released. It was eventually re-released as Kylie Christmas: Snow Queen Edition the following year and as Kylie Christmas: Fully Wrapped in 2025.

In 2017, Minogue signed a global recording contract with BMG Rights Management and a joint deal with Mushroom Music Labels, under the sub-division label Liberator Music for a distribution deal in Australia and New Zealand. Her subsequent releases under BMG and Liberator were studio albums Golden (2018), Disco (2020), Tension (2023) and Tension II (2024), as well as the compilation album Step Back in Time: The Definitive Collection (2019)—all debuted at number one in Australia and the UK. She is the only female artist to have a number-one album in five consecutive decades.

== Studio albums ==
List of studio albums, with selected chart positions, sales figures and certifications
Title	Details	Peak chart positions										Sales	Certifications
Title	Details	AUS	AUT	GER	IRE	JPN	NLD	NZ	SWI	UK	US	Sales	Certifications
Kylie	Released: 4 July 1988; Label: PWL; Mushroom; Geffen; Formats: cassette; CD; LP	2	15	8	—	30	42	1	7	1	53	JPN: 102,000 (Note: Japan sales figure for Minogue's albums as of 2006.); UK: 2,134,461 (Note: United Kingdom sales figure for Kylie as of September 2023.)	ARIA: 4× Platinum; BPI: 7× Platinum; BVMI: Gold; IFPI FIN: Gold; IFPI SWI: Platinum; RMNZ: Platinum; RIAA: Gold
Enjoy Yourself	Released: 9 October 1989; Label: PWL; Mushroom; Geffen; Formats: cassette; CD; LP	9	—	33	1	5	50	6	13	1	—	JPN: 49,000	ARIA: Platinum; BPI: 4× Platinum; IFPI SWI: Gold; RIAJ: Gold; RMNZ: Gold
Rhythm of Love	Released: 12 November 1990; Label: PWL; Mushroom; Formats: cassette; CD; LP	10	—	—	2	32	76	36	—	9	—	UK: 300,000 (Note: United Kingdom sales figure for Rhythm of Love as of March 1991.); JPN: 67,000	ARIA: Platinum; BPI: Gold
Let's Get to It	Released: 14 October 1991; Label: PWL; Mushroom; Formats: cassette; CD; LP	13	—	—	—	37	—	—	—	15	—	JPN: 25,350	ARIA: Gold
Kylie Minogue	Released: 19 September 1994; Label: Deconstruction; Mushroom; Formats: cassette; CD; LP	3	—	78	—	54	—	37	33	4	—	JPN: 23,440; UK: 124,806 (Note: United Kingdom sales figure for Minogue's albums as of October 2020.)	ARIA: Gold; BPI: Gold
Impossible Princess	Released: 22 October 1997; Label: Deconstruction; Mushroom; Formats: cassette; CD; LP	3	—	25	—	—	—	—	55	5	— (Note: Impossible Princess did not enter the US' Billboard 200 upon release; it peaked at number 71 on the Top Album Sales component chart in 2022.)	UK: 64,483	ARIA: Platinum
Light Years	Released: 25 September 2000; Label: Parlophone; Mushroom; Formats: cassette; CD; LP	1	—	35	13	—	71	8	28	2	—	UK: 508,739 (Note: United Kingdom sales figure for Light Years as of September 2023.)	ARIA: 4× Platinum; BPI: Platinum
Fever	Released: 1 October 2001; Label: Parlophone; Mushroom; Capitol; Formats: cassette; CD; LP	1	1	1	1	17	7	3	3	1	3	JPN: 106,670 (Note: Japan combined sales figure for both the Special (93,340) and Hyper (13,300) edition of Fever as of 2006.); UK: 1,744,371 (Note: United Kingdom sales figure for Fever as of September 2023.); US: 1,159,000 (Note: United States sales figure for Minogue's albums as of March 2011.)	ARIA: 7× Platinum; BPI: 5× Platinum; BVMI: Platinum; IFPI AUT: 3× Platinum; IFPI SWI: 2× Platinum; NVPI: Gold; RIAA: Platinum; RMNZ: 2× Platinum
Body Language	Released: 17 November 2003; Label: Parlophone; Festival; Capitol; Formats: cassette; CD; digital download; LP	2	23	11	19	43	19	23	8	6	42	JPN: 15,500; UK: 403,251; US: 177,000	ARIA: 2× Platinum; BPI: Platinum; IFPI: Gold; IFPI SWI: Gold
X	Released: 26 November 2007; Label: Parlophone; Festival; Astralwerks; Formats: cassette; CD; CD+DVD; digital download; USB	1	16	15	14	40	29	38	9	4	139	UK: 473,537; US: 42,000	ARIA: Platinum; BPI: Platinum; IRMA: Gold
Aphrodite	Released: 5 July 2010; Label: Parlophone; Festival; Astralwerks; Formats: CD; CD+DVD; digital download; LP	2	3	3	5	28	4	11	2	1	19	UK: 335,474; US: 50,000	ARIA: Platinum; BPI: Platinum
Kiss Me Once	Released: 17 March 2014; Label: Parlophone; Warner Bros.; Formats: CD; CD+DVD; digital download; box set; LP; streaming	1	16	9	4	40	10	13	8	2	31	AUS: 10,247 (Note: Australia sales figure for Kiss Me Once as of March 2014.); UK: 90,884	BPI: Silver
Kylie Christmas	Released: 13 November 2015; Label: Parlophone; Warner; Warner Bros.; Formats: CD; CD+DVD; digital download; LP; streaming	4	46	34	11	171	41	37	51	1	184	UK: 148,238	BPI: Gold
Golden	Released: 6 April 2018; Label: Darenote; BMG; Liberator; Formats: cassette; CD; digital download; LP; streaming	1	5	3	2	64	18	16	4	1	64	UK: 167,761 (Note: United Kingdom sales figure for Golden as of September 2023.)	BPI: Gold
Disco	Released: 6 November 2020; Label: Darenote; BMG; Liberator; Formats: cassette; CD; digital download; LP; streaming	1	7	3	4	64	11	9	4	1	26	UK: 179,892 (Note: United Kingdom sales figure for Disco as of September 2023.); US: 35,000 (Note: United States sales figure for Disco as of November 2021.)	BPI: Gold
Tension	Released: 22 September 2023; Label: Darenote; BMG; Liberator; Formats: cassette; CD; digital download; LP; streaming	1	9	5	2	— (Note: Tension did not enter Japan's Oricon Albums Chart; it peaked at number 20 on the Western Album component chart.)	3	5	2	1	21	UK: 96,532 (Note: United Kingdom sales figure for Tension as of October 2024.); WW: 500,000 (Note: Worldwide sales figure for Tension as of September 2024.)	BPI: Gold
Tension II	Released: 18 October 2024; Label: Darenote; BMG; Liberator; Formats: cassette; CD; digital download; LP; streaming	1	6	4	8	— (Note: Tension II did not enter Japan's Oricon Albums Chart; it peaked at number 40 on the Japanese Digital Albums component chart.)	5	22	4	1	98	UK: 35,235 (Note: United Kingdom sales figure for Tension II as of October 2024.)	BPI: Silver
"—" denotes album that did not chart or was not released, or position unknown.

== Live albums ==
List of live albums, with details, selected chart positions and certifications
Title	Details	Peak chart positions										Certifications
Title	Details	AUS	AUT	FRA	GER	IRE	NLD	SWI	UK	US Sales	US Dance	Certifications
Intimate and Live	Released: 30 November 1998; Label: Mushroom; Formats: CD; DVD	28	—	—	—	—	—	—	—	—	—	
KylieFever2002	Released: 18 November 2002; Label: Parlophone; Formats: CD; DVD	—	—	—	—	—	—	—	—	—	—	
Showgirl	Released: 12 December 2005; Label: Parlophone; Formats: DVD; digital download	—	—	—	—	—	—	—	—	—	—	
Showgirl: Homecoming Live	Released: 8 January 2007; Label: Parlophone; Formats: cassette; CD; digital download; DVD	28	55	113	59	—	—	54	7	—	—	BPI: Silver
Kylie Live in New York	Released: 14 December 2009; Label: Parlophone; Formats: digital download	—	—	—	—	—	—	—	—	—	13	
Aphrodite Les Folies – Live in London	Released: 28 November 2011; Label: Parlophone; Formats: CD+DVD; digital download	—	—	94	48	—	—	—	72	—	—	
Kiss Me Once Live at the SSE Hydro	Released: 23 March 2015; Label: Parlophone; Warner; Formats: Blu-ray; CD; CD+DVD; digital download; DVD	97	—	—	51	30	28	—	26	—	21	
Golden Live in Concert	Released: 6 December 2019; Label: Darenote; BMG; Liberator; Formats: CD+DVD; digital download; streaming	13	—	121	—	—	—	—	23	80	—	
Infinite Disco	Released: 8 April 2022; Label: Darenote; BMG; Liberator; Formats: digital download; LP; streaming	27	—	—	47	—	—	72	40	74	—	
Tension Tour//Live 2025	Released: 26 September 2025; Label: Darenote; BMG; Liberator; Formats: CD; digital download; LP; streaming	14	—	—	58	—	—	31	19	—	—	
"—" denotes album that did not chart or was not released.

== Compilation albums ==
List of compilation albums, with details, selected chart positions, sales figures and certifications
Title	Details	Peak chart positions										Sales	Certifications
Title	Details	AUS	AUT	GER	IRE	JPN	NLD	NZ	SWI	UK	US	Sales	Certifications
Greatest Hits	Released: 24 August 1992; Label: PWL; Mushroom; Formats: cassette; CD; LP	3	—	81	—	23	—	49	—	1	—		ARIA: Platinum; BPI: Platinum
Hits +	Released: 7 November 2000; Label: BMG; Formats: cassette; CD	63	—	—	—	—	—	—	—	41	—		BPI: Silver
Confide in Me	Released: 12 November 2002; Label: BMG; Formats: CD	—	—	—	—	—	—	—	—	—	—		BPI: Silver
Greatest Hits	Released: 18 November 2002; Label: BMG; Formats: cassette; CD	—	—	—	37	—	56	—	—	20	—		
Greatest Hits: 87–99	Released: 3 December 2003; Label: Festival; Formats: cassette; CD	54	—	—	—	—	—	—	—	—	—		
Artist Collection	Released: 20 September 2004; Label: BMG; Formats: cassette; CD	—	—	—	—	—	—	—	—	—	—		
Ultimate Kylie	Released: 22 November 2004; Label: Parlophone; Festival; Capitol; Formats: cassette; CD	5	15	10	8	39	37	33	19	4	—	US: 50,000	ARIA: 4× Platinum; IFPI AUT: Gold; IRMA: 3× Platinum; BPI: 3× Platinum
Confide in Me: The Irresistible Kylie	Released: 16 July 2007; Label: Music Club; Formats: CD	—	—	—	—	—	—	—	—	—	—		
Hits	Released: 16 March 2011; Label: EMI Music Japan; Formats: CD; digital download	—	—	—	—	62	—	—	—	—	—		
The Best of Kylie Minogue	Released: 4 June 2012; Label: EMI; Formats: CD; digital download	39	—	85	22	76	—	—	63	11	— (Note: The Best of Kylie Minogue did not enter the US' Billboard 200; it peaked at number 13 on the Dance/Electronic Albums chart.)		BPI: Silver
The Abbey Road Sessions	Released: 29 October 2012; Label: Parlophone; Warner; Astralwerks; Formats: CD; digital download; LP	7	53	31	10	110	—	39	17	2	120		BPI: Gold
Confide in Me	Released: 8 April 2016; Label: BMG; Formats: CD	—	—	—	—	—	—	—	—	—	—		
Step Back in Time: The Definitive Collection	Released: 28 June 2019; Label: Darenote; BMG; Liberator; Formats: cassette; CD; digital download; LP; streaming	1	21	15	4	—	23	27	11	1	— (Note: Step Back in Time: The Definitive Collection did not enter the US' Billboard 200; it peaked at number 32 on the Top Album Sales chart.)	UK: 228,584 (Note: United Kingdom sales figure for Step Back in Time: The Definitive Collection as of September 2023.)	BPI: Platinum
"—" denotes album that did not chart or was not released, or position unknown.

== Extended plays ==
List of extended plays, with details
Title	Details	Peak chart positions	Sales
Title	Details	UK	Sales
Live and Other Sides	Released: 1998; Label: Mushroom; Formats: CD; Track listing: 1. "Tears"; 2. "Love Takes Over Me"; 3. "Love Is Waiting"; 4. "If You Don't Love Me" (live); 5. "Put Yourself in My Place" (live); 6. "Automatic Love" (live)	—	
Other Sides	Released: 1998; Label: Mushroom; Formats: CD; Track listing: 1. "Tears"; 2. "Love Takes Over Me"; 3. "Take Me with You"	—	
Money Can't Buy (Note: American promotional release, came free with Body Language (2003) at Target.)	Released: 10 February 2004; Label: Parlophone; Format: CD; Track listing: 1. "Can't Get You Out of My Head" (live); 2. "Slow" (live); 3. "Red Blooded Woman" (live)	—	
Darling	Released: 9 February 2007; Label: Parlophone; Formats: CD	—	
Pink Sparkle	Released: July 2010; Label: Parlophone; Formats: CD	—	
Performance (Note: Given out in The Irish Mail.)	Released: 19 September 2010; Label: Parlophone; Formats: CD; Track listing: 1. "In Your Eyes" (live in New York); 2. "Wow"; 3. "Love at First Sight" (live in New York); 4. "I Believe in You" (live in New York); 5. "Boombox" / "Can't Get You Out of My Head" (live in New York); 6. "Too Much" (live in New York); 7. "Slow" (live in New York); 8. "In My Arms" (live in New York); 9. "Speakerphone" (live in New York); 10. "Come into My World" (live in New York); 11. "Like a Drug" (live in New York); 12. "Light Years" (live in New York)	—	
A Kylie Christmas	Released: 30 November 2010; Label: Parlophone; Formats: digital download	188	UK: 2,000
A Christmas Gift	Released: 1 December 2010; Label: Parlophone; Formats: digital download	—	
North American Tour (Bonus Track Version)	Released: 3 May 2011; Label: Astralwerks; Formats: CD; digital download; Track listing: 1. "Can't Get You Out of My Head" (BBC Live Lounge version); 2. "All the Lovers" (BBC Live Lounge version); 3. "Get Outta My Way" (BBC Live Lounge version); 4. "Better than Today" (live in New York); 5. "Confide in Me" (live in New York); 6. Tour Film (North American Tour)	—	
"—" denotes extended play did not chart or was not released, or position unknown.

== Remix albums ==
List of remix albums, with details and selected chart positions
Title	Details	Peak chart positions				
Title	Details	AUS	FRA	JPN	UK	US Dance
Kylie's Remixes	Released: 16 March 1989; Label: PWL; Formats: cassette; CD; LP	132	—	13	—	—
Kylie's Remixes: Vol. 2	Released: 1 July 1992; Label: PWL; Formats: cassette; CD	121	—	90	—	—
Kylie's Non-Stop History 50+1	Released: 1 July 1993; Label: PWL; Formats: cassette; CD	57	—	59	—	—
Impossible Remixes	Released: 8 July 1998; Label: Mushroom; Formats: CD	37	—	—	—	—
Mixes	Released: 3 August 1998; Label: Deconstruction; Formats: cassette; CD; LP	—	—	—	63	—
Greatest Remix Hits 1	Released: 15 September 1998; Label: Mushroom; Formats: cassette; CD	128	—	—	—	—
Greatest Remix Hits 2	Released: 15 September 1998; Label: Mushroom; Formats: cassette; CD	125	—	—	—	—
Greatest Remix Hits 3	Released: 15 September 1998; Label: Mushroom; Formats: cassette; CD	67	—	—	—	—
Greatest Remix Hits 4	Released: 15 September 1998; Label: Mushroom; Formats: cassette; CD	66	—	—	—	—
Boombox	Released: 17 December 2008; Label: Parlophone; Formats: CD; digital download	72	180	146	28	10
12″ Masters – Essential Mixes	Released: 17 September 2010; Label: Sony Music; Formats: CD; digital download	—	—	—	—	—
Disco: Extended Mixes	Released: 10 December 2021; Label: Darenote; BMG; Liberator; Formats: digital download; LP; streaming	—	—	—	—	—
Extension: The Extended Mixes	Released: 8 December 2023; Label: Darenote; BMG; Liberator; Formats: digital download; LP; streaming	28	—	—	75	16
"—" denotes album that did not chart or was not released.

== Box sets ==
List of box sets, with details and selected chart positions
Title	Details	Peak chart positions	
Title	Details	AUS	UK
X3	Released: 1999; Formats: CD	—	—
Kylie Minogue / Impossible Princess	Released: 2007; Label: Deconstruction; Formats: CD	—	—
The Albums 2000–2010	Released: 18 July 2011; Label: Parlophone; Formats: CD; digital download	—	37
K25 Time Capsule	Released: 29 October 2012; Label: Warner Music Australasia; Formats: Mini CD	183	—
"—" denotes box set did not chart or was not released.

== See also ==
- List of artists who have achieved simultaneous number-one UK single and album
- List of artists who reached number one on the album chart in Ireland
- List of artists who reached number one on the Australian albums chart
- List of artists who topped the UK Albums Chart in four or more decades
- List of artists with the most UK Albums Chart number ones
- List of artists with the most UK Albums Chart top tens

== Notes ==
Sales figure

Peak component chart positions

Extended plays
