= Impossible Remixes =

1998 album by Kylie Minogue

Remix album by Kylie Minogue
- Released: 8 July 1998
- Genre: Dance
- Length: 90:34
- Label: Mushroom
- Producers: Kylie Minogue; Dave Ball; James Dean Bradfield; Brothers in Rhythm; Jay Burnett; Rob Dougan; Dave Eringa; Ingo Vauk

Kylie Minogue chronology
Impossible Princess (1997)	Impossible Remixes (1998)	Mixes (1998)

Impossible Remixes is the fourth remix album by Australian singer and songwriter Kylie Minogue. It was released on 8 July 1998 by Mushroom Records. The album was materialized while on her Intimate and Live Tour (1998) and contains remixes from her sixth studio album Impossible Princess (1997). Originally scheduled for a 1999 release, Mushroom released Impossible Remixes in Australia in July 1998 after releasing the UK counterpart Mixes (1998) earlier than its original date.

The cover sleeve for the album was shot by British photographer Simon Emmett; Minogue had personally commended the cover sleeve for showing "a lot of heart". Impossible Remixes received negative reviews from music critics, who viewed the release as tedious and the material as repetitive. Impossible Remixes is Minogue's highest charting remix album in her native country, reaching 37 on the Australian ARIA Albums Chart.

== Background and release ==
In November 1997, Minogue released her sixth studio album Impossible Princess. Then in January 1998, Minogue begun rehearsals on the low-budget tour Intimate and Live. Minogue intended to only perform in Australia, but strong public demand in the United Kingdom prompt Minogue to tour there too. With tickets selling out instantly, more shows were announced in both Australia and the UK. Minogue started the tour in early June 1998 and released "Cowboy Style" as the fourth single from Impossible Princess. Two remix albums were subsequently issued in 1998: Mushroom released Impossible Remixes exclusively in Australia on 8 July, and Deconstruction released Mixes on 3 August in the UK.

The cover sleeve was shot by English photographer Simon Emmett and designed by Andrew Murabito. After completing the shoot, Emmett was asked by Minogue to shoot the sleeve for her single "Cowboy Style". One of the shoot outtakes appeared on Minogue's photo albums including Kylie / Fashion and on her 1997 extended play Other Sides. In the photo book Kylie / Fashion, Emmett commented on the photo shoot: "[Minogue's] natural poise and dynamism transcended all typical props and accessories. We've made great use here of our easy rapport." Minogue commended the photo shoot at the time, saying "So much of what I was doing at this time had a tiny budget so I brought a lot of pieces... It was a great, simple shoot with a lot of heart."

== Material ==
The album features remixes of three singles from Impossible Princess: four remixes of "Breathe", two remixes of "Did It Again" and one remix of "Some Kind of Bliss", along with three remixes of Minogue's promotional single "Too Far". The remixes had all been previously featured in Minogue's CD singles. Impossible Remixes features one remix that did not appear on Mixes, this being the "Breathe" TNT Club remix, a club commissioned edit of Tee's Freeze Mix. All tracks were co-written by Minogue, with additional song writing assistance by James Dean Bradfield, Dave Ball, Ingo Vauk, Steve Anderson and David Seaman. In late 1997, Minogue traveled to New York to re-record her vocals for the "Breathe" remixes by American producer and disc jockey Todd Terry.

== Reception ==
Professional ratings
Review scores
Source	Rating
Allmusic	1.5/5 stars

Impossible Remixes received negative reviews from music critics. Jenny Stanley-Clarke, who wrote the biography Kylie: Naked, felt the release "seemed nothing more than to run out Kylie's contractual obligation for a required third Deconstruction album." She favoured the contributions of "high profiled" DJ's. Brendan Swift from Allmusic awarded the compilation only one-and-a-half stars out of five, making this Minogue's lowest scoring remix album and overall album on the website. In his review, he argued the material was not new and felt the release tedious and the material was repetitive; he viewed the Razor-n-Go Remix of "Did it Again" as an example, despite highlighting it. In his extended review, he explained;

Pint-sized pop diva Kylie Minogue's continued crossover from lightweight pop puppet to respected artist continued with the release of this, a compilation of remixed singles from the Impossible Princess album. [Impossible Remixes] walks an unrelenting line — with ten versions of four songs ("Breathe" clocks in with the highest total at four versions), there's not a lot of room for variation — and the repetition certainly makes for classic club fodder. This is the voice of the new Minogue doing dance as the faded remnants of the Stock, Aitken and Waterman patsy is left well and truly behind — she's now the voice behind the DJs — and there's plenty of their work on this double CD set to sink your teeth into [...] Hardcore Minogue fans with a good pair of dancing shoes may find this gyrating repetition worthwhile; general fans, however, may find the original Impossible Princess more accommodating.

Early pressings of Impossible Remixes helped the album debut at number thirty-seven on the Australian Albums Chart on 26 July 1998, the fourth highest debuting album that week. During its debut week, Minogue's album Impossible Princess also charted at number nine. This became her highest and only remix album to chart in Australia and her second compilation album to chart. The album slipped to number thirty nine the next week, whereas Impossible Princess fell to eleven.

== Track listing ==
Disc one
No.	Title	Writer(s)	Length
1.	"Too Far" (Brothers in Rhythm mix)	Kylie Minogue	10:22
2.	"Breathe" (TNT Club mix)	Minogue, Dave Ball, Ingo Vauk	6:45
3.	"Did It Again" (Trouser Enthusiasts' Goddess of Contortion mix)	Minogue, Steve Anderson, Dave Seaman	10:22
4.	"Breathe" (Tee's Freeze mix)	Minogue, Ball, Vauk	6:59
5.	"Some Kind of Bliss" (Quivver mix)	Minogue, James Dean Bradfield, Seaman	8:40
Total length:			43:08

Disc two
No.	Title	Writer(s)	Length
1.	"Too Far" (Junior Vasquez mix)	Minogue	11:52
2.	"Did It Again" (Razor-n-Go mix)	Minogue, Anderson, Seaman	11:21
3.	"Breathe" (Sash! Club mix)	Minogue, Ball, Vauk	5:23
4.	"Too Far" (Brothers in Rhythm dub)	Minogue	8:37
5.	"Breathe" (Nalin & Kane remix)	Minogue, Ball, Vauk	10:13
Total length:			47:26

== Personnel ==
All credits and personnel adapted from Impossible Remixes liner notes:

- Kylie Minogue – vocals, producer, songwriter
- Brothers in Rhythm – producer, remixing
- Dave Ball – producer, songwriter
- Ingo Vauk – producer, songwriter
- David Seaman – producer, songwriter
- Steve Anderson – producer, songwriter
- James Dean Bradfield – producer, songwriter
- Todd Terry – remixing
- John Graham – remixing
- Junior Vasquez – remixing
- Razor-n-Go – remixing
- Sash! – remixing
- Andy Nalin – remixing
- Harry Cane – remixing
- Simon Emmett – art direction, photographer
- Andrew Murabito – art direction, designer

== Charts ==
Chart (1998)	Peak position
Australian Albums (ARIA)	37
