= Mixes (Kylie Minogue album) =

1998 album by Kylie Minogue

Remix album by Kylie Minogue
- Released: 3 August 1998
- Genre: Dance, electronica, techno, ambient
- Length: 73:18 (vinyl edition); 83:55 (CD edition)
- Label: Deconstruction
- Producers: Steve Anderson; David Seaman; Dave Ball; Ingo Vauk; Rob Dougan; Jay Burnett; James Dean Bradfield; Dave Eringa

Kylie Minogue chronology
| Impossible Remixes (1998) | Mixes (1998) | Greatest Remix Hits (1998) |

Mixes is the fifth remix album by Australian recording artist Kylie Minogue. It was released on 3 August 1998, by Deconstruction Records. The album contains remixes of tracks from her sixth studio album, Impossible Princess (1997). The remixes were done by DJs such as Brothers in Rhythm, Junior Vasquez, and Todd Terry. The remixes were influenced by various genres of dance music, such as electronica and dance-pop. The album was originally scheduled for a 1999 release, but Deconstruction pre-poned the release date of Mixes in the United Kingdom to August 1998, since the Australian counterpart, Impossible Remixes (1998), had been released earlier than its original date. With favourable critical reception, Mixes charted in the United Kingdom at number sixty-three on the UK Albums Chart, her highest remix album at the time. The Brothers in Rhythm remix of "Too Far" was released as a promotional single in the UK and North America.

== Background ==
In October 1997, Minogue released her sixth studio album, Impossible Princess. Then in January 1998, Minogue begun rehearsals on the low-budget tour, Intimate and Live. Minogue intended to only perform in Australia, but strong public demand in the United Kingdom prompted her to schedule dates there. With tickets selling out instantly, more shows were announced in both Australia and the UK. Minogue started the tour in early June 1998 and confirmed that she would release "Cowboy Style", the fourth single from the Impossible Princess album, and revealed plans of two remix albums, one for Australia and one for the UK.

In July 1998, Deconstruction and Mushroom confirmed the release of two remix albums entitled Mixes and Impossible Remixes respectively. Deconstruction said the Mixes album would be released as a triple-vinyl set and set the release date for the following year. However, fans voiced their concerns on expensive import prices for global shipping and with increasingly popular demand, Deconstruction scrapped the idea and released the remixes on a two-set compact disc, and forward the triple vinyl at a later date. This allowed Deconstruction to release the album earlier and Mixes was released on 3 August 1998 in the UK. Mushroom released Impossible Remixes on 8 July 1998, but initial pressings were on sale two months earlier.

== Material ==
The album shares nine remixes from the Impossible Remixes album; three remixes of "Breathe", two remixes of "Did It Again" and one remix of "Some Kind of Bliss", along with three remixes of Minogue's promotional single "Too Far". The remixes had all been previously featured in Minogue's CD singles. All tracks were co-written by Minogue, with additional song writing assistance by James Dean Bradfield, Dave Ball, Ingo Vauk, Steve Anderson and David Seaman. In late 1997, Minogue traveled to New York to re-record her vocals for the "Breathe" remixes by American producer and disc jockey Todd Terry.

Mixes is a dance–remix album, and according to Brendan Swift at AllMusic, the songs are well-noted "where constant repetition is heard at its most catchy with a hint of something we know: other dance melodies used 'again and again.'" Charlie Porter from Amazon.co.uk commented about some songs remixes; "Brothers in Rhythm work their slinky magic on "Too Far", Sash! Takes the album down a Euro-trance path, then the good old Trouser Enthusiasts turn "Did It Again" even more saucy."

== Artwork and sleeve ==
The artwork was photographed by British photographer Simon Emmett and designed by Farrow Design, who both contributed to the cover sleeve of Impossible Remixes. The artwork shows a "simple yet subtle" silhouette of Minogue which later appeared on the tour guide for the Intimate and Live concerts. After completing the shoot, Emmett was asked by Minogue to shoot the sleeve for her single "Cowboy Style", and his most recent work with Minogue was shooting her on Glamour magazine in July 2012.

== Release and reception ==
Professional ratings
Review scores
| Source | Rating |
|---|---|
| Amazon.co.uk | (positive) |

Jenny Stanley-Clarke, who wrote the biography Kylie: Naked, felt the release "seemed nothing more than to run out Kylie's contractual obligation for a required third Deconstruction album." She favoured the contributions of "high profiled" DJ's. Charlie Porter from Amazon.co.uk discussed Impossible Princess' "sob story", highlighting the album's title change, single releases, and album release as factors to it. He then stated "This remix album takes away some of that records pretensions (yes, it was a touch flawed), and puts our favourite Australian back on the party floor, where she belongs." He concluded "Yes sir, that girl can boogie—please don't try and turn into an indie queen again." Mixes debuted at sixty-three on the UK Albums Chart on the entry date 15 August 1998. The album was Minogue's highest charting remix album in the UK, until it was taken over by Boombox, which peaked at twenty-eight. Mixes also charted on the UK Physical Albums Chart, which compile the top 100 albums based on physical CD sales; it also reached at number sixty-three. It is also Minogue's final album from Deconstruction.

== Singles and promotion ==
The Brothers in Rhythm remix of "Too Far" served as the album's promotional single on 21 May 1998. "Too Far" was originally selected as a potential single for Impossible Princess, but Deconstruction decided to release "Some Kind of Bliss" instead. "Too Far" was released as a promotional single in the UK by Deconstruction and North America by BMG, but Deconstruction refused to promote it after BMG released it without discussion. The vinyl included a bonus remix side by Junior Vasquez. Both the original version, and the remix version received critical acclaim from most critics, whom highlighted it as an album stand out. "Too Far" has been included on two of her concert tours; Intimate and Live Tour and Showgirl: The Homecoming Tour.

== Track listing ==
Disc one
| No. | Title | Writer(s) | Length |
|---|---|---|---|
| 1. | "Too Far" (Brothers in Rhythm Mix) | Kylie Minogue | 10:23 |
| 2. | "Too Far" (Junior Vasquez Remix) | Minogue | 11:52 |
| 3. | "Some Kind of Bliss" (Quivver Mix) | Minogue, James Dean Bradfield, Seaman | 8:40 |
| 4. | "Breathe" (Tee's Freeze Mix) | Minogue, Ball, Vauk | 7:01 |
| 5. | "Breathe" (Sash! Club Mix) | Minogue, Ball, Vauk | 5:23 |
| Total length: | | | 43:19 |

Disc two
| No. | Title | Writer(s) | Length |
|---|---|---|---|
| 1. | "Breathe" (Nalin & Kane Remix) | Minogue, Ball, Vauk | 10:12 |
| 2. | "Did It Again" (Trouser Enthusiasts' Goddess of Contortion Mix) | Minogue, Steve Anderson, Dave Seaman | 10:24 |
| 3. | "Did It Again" (Razor-n-Go Mix) | Minogue, Anderson, Seaman | 11:23 |
| 4. | "Too Far" (Brothers in Rhythm Dub) | Minogue | 8:37 |
| Total length: | | | 40:36 |

=== Notes ===
- The 3xLP vinyl edition contains two tracks on each side.
- "Too Far" (Brothers in Rhythm Dub) is excluded from the vinyl release, making "Did It Again" (Razor-n-Go Mix) the last track from side F of the album.

== Personnel ==
All credits and personnel adapted from Mixes liner notes:

- Kylie Minogue – vocals, producer, songwriter
- Brothers in Rhythm – producer, remixing
- Dave Ball – producer, songwriter
- Ingo Vauk – producer, songwriter
- David Seaman – producer, songwriter
- Steve Anderson – producer, songwriter
- James Dean Bradfield – producer, songwriter
- Todd Terry – remixing
- John Graham – remixing
- Junior Vasquez – remixing
- Razor-n-Go – remixing
- Sash! – remixing
- Andy Nalin – remixing
- Harry Cane – remixing
- Simon Emmett – art direction, photographer
- Farrow – art direction, designer

== Charts ==
| Chart (1998) | Peak; position |
|---|---|
| UK Albums (Official Charts) | 63 |
