= Kylie Live in New York =

2009 album by Kylie Minogue

Live album by Kylie Minogue
- Released: 14 December 2009
- Recorded: 11–13 October 2009
- Venue: Hammerstein Ballroom (New York City)
- Genre: Pop; dance pop; electronica
- Length: 122:02
- Label: Parlophone
- Producer: Steve Anderson; Kylie Minogue

Kylie Minogue chronology
Boombox (2008)	Kylie Live in New York (2009)	Aphrodite (2010)

Professional ratings
Review scores
Source	Rating
Digital Spy	5/5 stars
The Observer	(favorable)

Kylie Live in New York is a live album by Australian singer and songwriter Kylie Minogue. The album is a live recording of her North American tour, during her performance at the Hammerstein Ballroom in New York City. Live in New York was released on 14 December 2009, exclusively to online digital media stores. The album does not include "Better than Today", which was not included due to it appearing on Minogue's then forthcoming album Aphrodite. Minogue's official YouTube page streamed a live recording of the first half of the concert on 12 December 2009.

== Release ==
The album was initially released to digitally to various online stores both in the U.S. and internationally. To promote the album, Minogue streamed the first half of the album on her official YouTube channel. To promote her following album, Aphrodite, a promotional sampler was released in addition with the album at Asda Supermarkets. Additionally, a free promotional sampler, entitled Performance, was included in The Mail on Sunday on 19 September 2010.

== Track listing ==
Live in New York
No.	Title	Length
1.	"Overture"	1:40
2.	"Light Years"	4:20
3.	"Speakerphone"	4:46
4.	"Come into My World"	3:55
5.	"In Your Eyes"	3:22
6.	"Everything Taboo Medley" ("Shocked" / "What Do I Have to Do?" / "Spinning Around")	9:18
7.	"Like a Drug"	4:49
8.	"Boombox" / "Can't Get Blue Monday Out of My Head"	5:03
9.	"Slow"	6:21
10.	"2 Hearts"	4:18
11.	"Red Blooded Woman" / "Where the Wild Roses Grow"	4:44
12.	"Heart Beat Rock"	2:14
13.	"Wow"	3:01
14.	"White Diamond Theme"	2:09
15.	"White Diamond"	3:11
16.	"Confide in Me"	4:47
17.	"I Believe in You"	3:03
18.	"Burning Up" / "Vogue"	3:20
19.	"The Loco-Motion"	4:56
20.	"Kids"	5:00
21.	"In My Arms"	4:09
22.	"Better the Devil You Know"	4:42
23.	"The One"	4:27
24.	"I Should Be So Lucky"	3:55
25.	"Love at First Sight"	6:40
Total length:		1:49:02

iTunes bonus tracks
No.	Title	Length
1.	"Light Years" (Steve Anderson studio version)	4:47
2.	"Speakerphone" (Steve Anderson studio version)	5:35
3.	"Come into My World" (Steve Anderson studio version)	3:54
Total length:		14:16

Asda promotional sampler
No.	Title	Length
1.	"Come into My World"	3:54
2.	"Slow"	4:21
3.	"Wow"	3:01
4.	"Better the Devil You Know"	4:42
5.	"Love at First Sight"	6:40
Total length:		22:38

Performance
No.	Title	Length
1.	"In Your Eyes"	3:21
2.	"Wow" (from the album X)	3:11
3.	"Love at First Sight"	4:51
4.	"I Believe in You"	3:00
5.	"Boombox / Can't Get Blue Monday Out of My Head"	4:56
6.	"Too Much" (from the album Aphrodite)	3:17
7.	"Slow"	4:25
8.	"In My Arms"	3:51
9.	"Speakerphone"	4:47
10.	"Come into My World"	3:40
11.	"Like a Drug"	4:52
12.	"Light Years"	4:22
Total length:		48:32

== Personnel ==
- Backing vocals – Roxanne Wilde, Lucita Jules
- Bass – Jenni Tarma
- Drums (electric and acoustic) – Matthew Racher
- Guitar – Adrian Eccleston
- Keyboards – Sarah De Courcy
- Producer, mixer, programmer – Steve Anderson
- Recorded by – Gary Bradshaw
- Saxophone – Graeme Belvins
- Trombone – Barnaby Dickinson
- Trumpet – Graeme Flowers

== Charts ==
Chart (2010)	Peak position
US Top Dance Albums (Billboard)	13
UK Album Downloads (OCC)	18
Scottish Albums (OCC)	22
