= Impossible Princess =

1997 album by Kylie Minogue

Studio album by Kylie Minogue
- Released: 22 October 1997
- Recorded: 1995–1997
- Studios: Dave & Ingo's Place; DMC; Mayfair Studios; Real World Studios (Wiltshire); Sarm West Studios
- Genres: Dance; experimental pop; electronica; trip hop; Britpop
- Length: 49:41
- Labels: Deconstruction; Mushroom
- Producers: Kylie Minogue (uncredited); Dave Ball; James Dean Bradfield; Brothers in Rhythm; Jay Burnett; Rob Dougan; Dave Eringa; Ingo Vauk

Kylie Minogue chronology
Kylie Minogue (1994)	Impossible Princess (1997)	Impossible Remixes (1998)

Singles from Impossible Princess
- 1. "Some Kind of Bliss" Released: 8 September 1997; 2. "Did It Again" Released: 24 November 1997; 3. "Breathe" Released: 16 March 1998; 4. "Cowboy Style" Released: 5 October 1998

Impossible Princess (briefly retitled Kylie Minogue in Europe) is the sixth album by the Australian singer Kylie Minogue, released on 22 October 1997, by Deconstruction, BMG and Mushroom Records. Minogue asserted greater creative control over the project—solo-writing almost every song on the album and producing material for the first time—compared to her previous work, assisted by Brothers in Rhythm, Manic Street Preachers, David Ball and Rob Dougan.

Influenced by the techno and Britpop revolution in the mid-to-late 1990s, sonically, Impossible Princess is a departure from Minogue's previous work. Conceived as an experimental record, the material encompasses a variety of darker styles from dance music, including trip hop, electronica, and rock. Lyrically, the album focuses on Minogue's self-discovery after a series of trips worldwide and delves into freedom of expression, relationships, and emotions.

Upon its release, critical and public reception of Impossible Princess was divided over its new musical direction and Minogue's intimate lyrics. Commercially, the album reached the top 10 in Australia, Scotland, and the United Kingdom; the British media, however, mocked its lack of success in Europe. Four singles were released from the album, including two UK top-20 entries "Did It Again" and "Breathe". Minogue embarked on the Intimate and Live tour in 1998 to support the album.

In retrospect, music commentators have praised Impossible Princess as Minogue's most personal and misunderstood work. Minogue has said in the past she would never create another album of personal songs like Impossible Princess. To celebrate 25 years since the album's original release, it was released on vinyl for the first time in October 2022, leading to its resurgence and reaching new peaks on record charts.

== Background ==
Minogue left her label PWL in 1992 because of creative differences and signed a three-album deal with Deconstruction Records the following year. She worked with a diverse group of collaborators to experiment with different sounds, including the British duo Brothers in Rhythm. Their first offering was Minogue's self-titled album in late 1994, which peaked at number three in Australia and number four in the United Kingdom. Besides promotional commitments for the album, Minogue expanded her acting career by taking part in several projects. Among them were big-budget films Street Fighter (1994) and Bio-Dome (1996), which were received poorly by critics. Minogue worked with Australian musician Nick Cave and his band, the Bad Seeds on their 1995 single "Where the Wild Roses Grow", which peaked at number two in Australia and number eleven in the UK. The song earned three ARIA Awards for Best Pop Release, Single, and Song of the Year in 1996.

Minogue's friendship with Cave continued over the years; on Cave's advice, Minogue recited the lyrics to her 1987 song "I Should Be So Lucky" as poetry at London's Royal Albert Hall in July 1996. In December, she made a surprise appearance at a Manic Street Preachers concert at the Shepherd's Bush Empire, singing "Little Baby Nothing" with them. The track was planned initially as a duet with Minogue but did not materialise during her years under contract with PWL. Both 1996 live performances were viewed as the starting point of her new alter ego, "IndieKylie", a pseudonym that dealt with Minogue's move to rock music. Minogue began a romantic relationship with French photographer Stéphane Sednaoui and embarked on a series of trips with him throughout North America, Asia, and Australasia to gain inspiration for her upcoming record. By the end of the trip, Minogue was enamoured by the experience and felt "truly anonymous and free to be [herself]".

== Recording and development ==
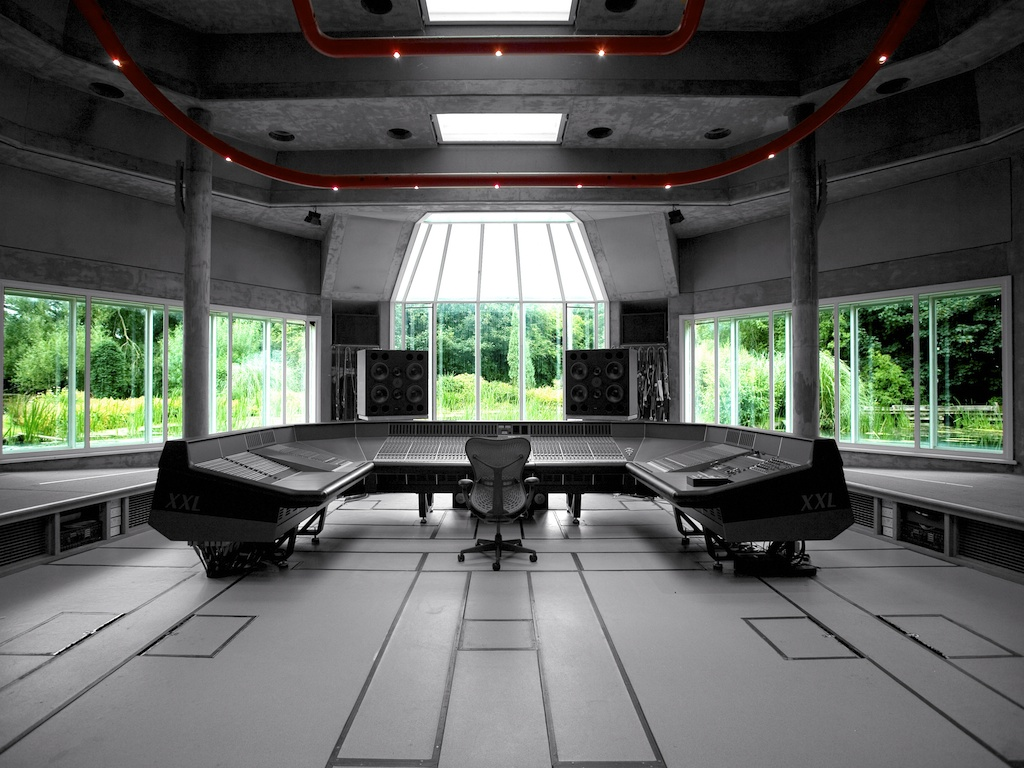
Production of Impossible Princess took place mainly at Real World Studios (pictured in 2013) in Box, Wiltshire.

Plans for Impossible Princess began in mid-1995 after meetings with Brothers in Rhythm had taken place and recording sessions began soon afterwards. By June 1997, the album had been in production for twenty-one months, and Deconstruction were adding the final touches to it. The album took nearly two years to record—the longest period Minogue had worked on a project since her time acting on the Australian soap opera Neighbours (from 1986 to 1988). Many changes of direction, remixes and cowriters lengthened the process which at times upset and infuriated Minogue. Brothers in Rhythm member Steve Anderson explained this was "due to the pure perfectionism" of everyone involved; Minogue felt the album was worth the wait.

Minogue's trips with Sednaoui, her Deconstruction label mates, and clients of Sednaoui's work including Björk, Garbage, and Tricky inspired the album. Sednaoui and Cave were key factors during the production. In the biography Kylie (2014), Sean Smith notes Sednaoui had a huge effect on Minogue's belief in herself and contributed to her vision of the future, while Cave helped her to embrace the past. Minogue began writing lyrics after Sednaoui and Cave convinced her to take creative control over her next musical project. She wrote every track on the album—in contrast, she co-wrote only one song on her 1994 album. She did not have any specific method for writing: she wrote constantly in her notebook and composed many songs during the holidays. "Cowboy Style" and "Dreams" were among the earliest songs Minogue wrote for the album; the lyrics and melodies came easily to her. Minogue imagined performing "Too Far" while working on its lyric, which she did at a local cafe. She found the track easy to write and did not sound like anything she had written before. She wanted to put herself into the album as much as possible, and felt the songs were more personal: "I've written lyrics before, but they've been safe–just neatly rhymed words and that's that. Now I have songs in which, from beginning to end, I don't want another word, I don't want a word removed," Minogue said.

=== Sessions with Brothers in Rhythm ===
Brothers in Rhythm put together a few songs initially planned for Impossible Princess but scrapped them because Minogue had started writing and they saw she had development as an artist. In order to work closely with Brothers in Rhythm, Minogue shared a house with them across the road from the Real World Studios in Box, Wiltshire, where each morning she would present a set of lyrics from the night before to Brothers in Rhythm producer Dave Seaman. Minogue then sang her ideas for the melody to the duo who tried to compose the backing tracks, find a suitable style, record rough demos, and add subtle lyric and melody ideas to each of them. Production took place mainly at Real World, where the rough demos were rearranged. Strings were added at Sarm West Studios in London, and the tracks were then sent back to Real World for the final mixes, handled by engineer Alan Bremner.

From those sessions, Brothers in Rhythm developed five more songs that ended up on the final tracklist: "Did It Again", "Limbo", "Dreams", "Say Hey", and "Cowboy Style". "Too Far" was written at Sarm West, where Anderson came up with the piano line on the final version. According to Anderson, the production grew as the song was created, and many ideas on the demos made it onto the finished tracks. "Limbo", "Too Far", "Did It Again" and "Cowboy Style", were released in their original demo form because Minogue felt the rawness of the tracks worked better than being polished. Anderson considered "Too Far" and "Drunk" to be the examples of Minogue's artistic progression, and her poetry lyrics were different from standard pop song structure. Pete Hadfield, the label's director, was ill, leaving Minogue to take partial creative control over the project. To help produce the album, she attended each session with Anderson and Seaman to learn about composing, arranging instruments, and distorting sections of the album's tracks. As a result, she is credited as a co-producer with Brothers in Rhythm on the songs "Too Far", "Breathe", and "Say Hey"; she played the synthesizer and provided backing vocals.

=== Other collaborations ===
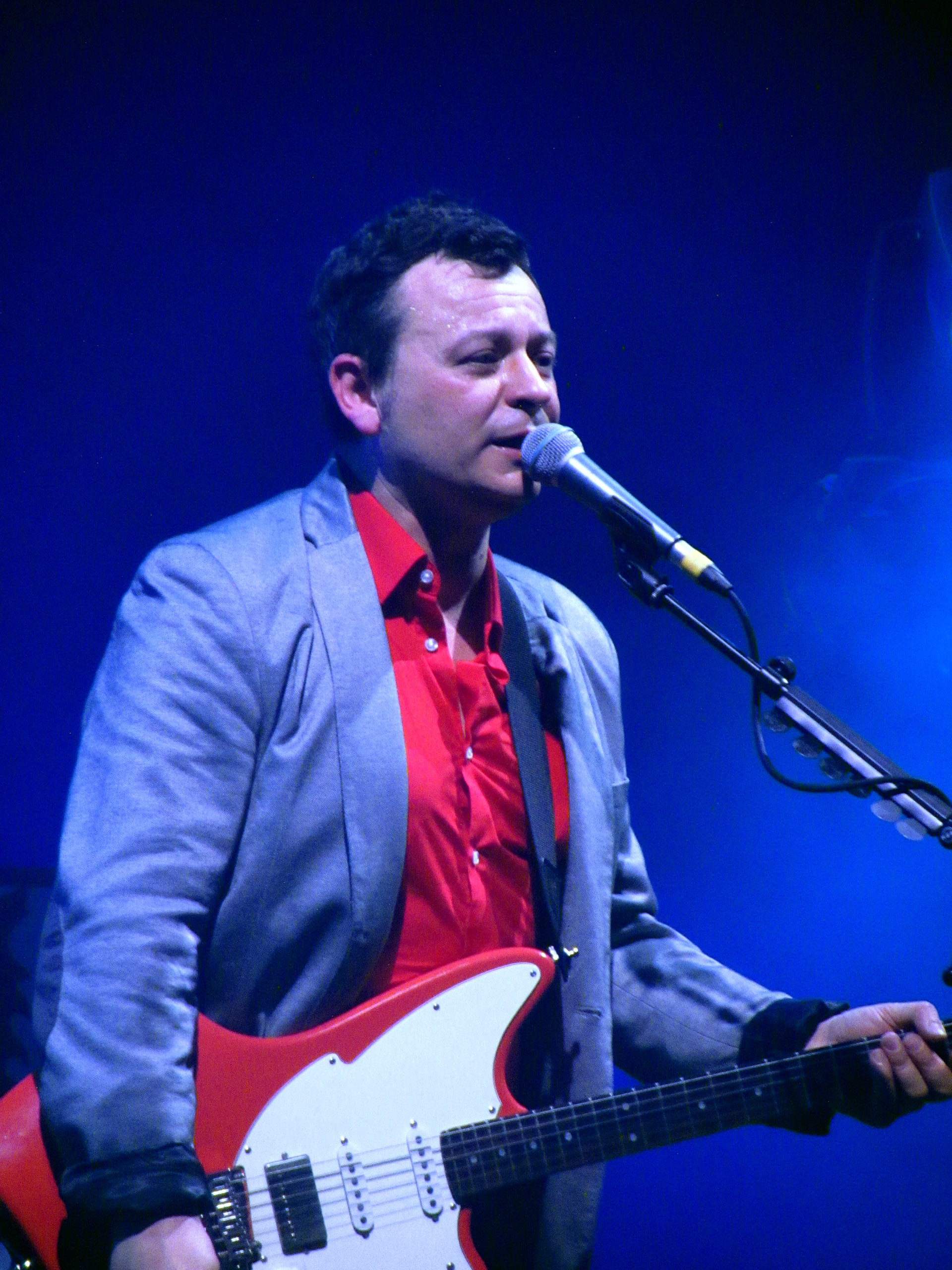
James Dean Bradfield (pictured in 2014) wrote and produced two tracks with Minogue.

Deconstruction encouraged Minogue to work with other artists, besides her sessions with Brothers in Rhythm, to produce enough potential tracks to release as singles. Like she had done on her 1994 album, Minogue was open to the idea of experimenting her sounds with different producers. She wrote "Through The Years", "Breathe", and "Limbo" during her sessions with the electronic producers Dave Ball and Ingo Vauk at their home studios; Minogue wrote the lyric of "Through the Years" within 10 minutes of hearing Ball and Vauk's track. Minogue had heard of Rob Dougan's work and thought that it would be interesting to work with him; they wrote and produced "Jump". She worked on two songs with English band Olive, but they were scrapped. Cave wrote a track for the album based on Minogue's lyrics, entitled "Soon", but she was disappointed with her recording and dropped it.

Minogue said that James Dean Bradfield of Manic Street Preachers had a clear idea of how he wanted her to sound during their first session at his home. Minogue found it difficult to re-write Bradfield's demo of "I Don't Need Anyone", so he had taken pieces of the original demo lyrics and mixed them with other lyrics she had written, with help from Nicky Wire, to create the finished version of "I Don't Need Anyone". She found this method of writing interesting and did it again with Bradfield and Sean Moore on "Some Kind of Bliss". She felt the lyrics worked together, and was pleased with the final result. Bradfield and frequent collaborator Dave Eringa produced both tracks.

== Musical styles ==
Musically, Impossible Princess experiments and blends different musical styles, as Minogue wanted the album to reflect her many sides. It is a departure from her previous sound, encompassing various elements from dance music. Music critics commented on the album's musical diversity. Marcel Anders of Orkus, and Nick Levine at Digital Spy labelled it a dance record, while a writer from Who magazine wrote the album ranges from trip hop, torch songs to scratchy guitar pop, and disco tracks. Sputnikmusic writers pointed out trance, rock, and alternative influences, and described the album as "something you would expect Björk to make". Michael Dwyer of The West Australian found the club-oriented production made the album standout. Chris True of AllMusic and Sal Cinquemani of Slant Magazine identified the record as part of the electronica and Britpop movements that spanned the mid-to-late 1990s.

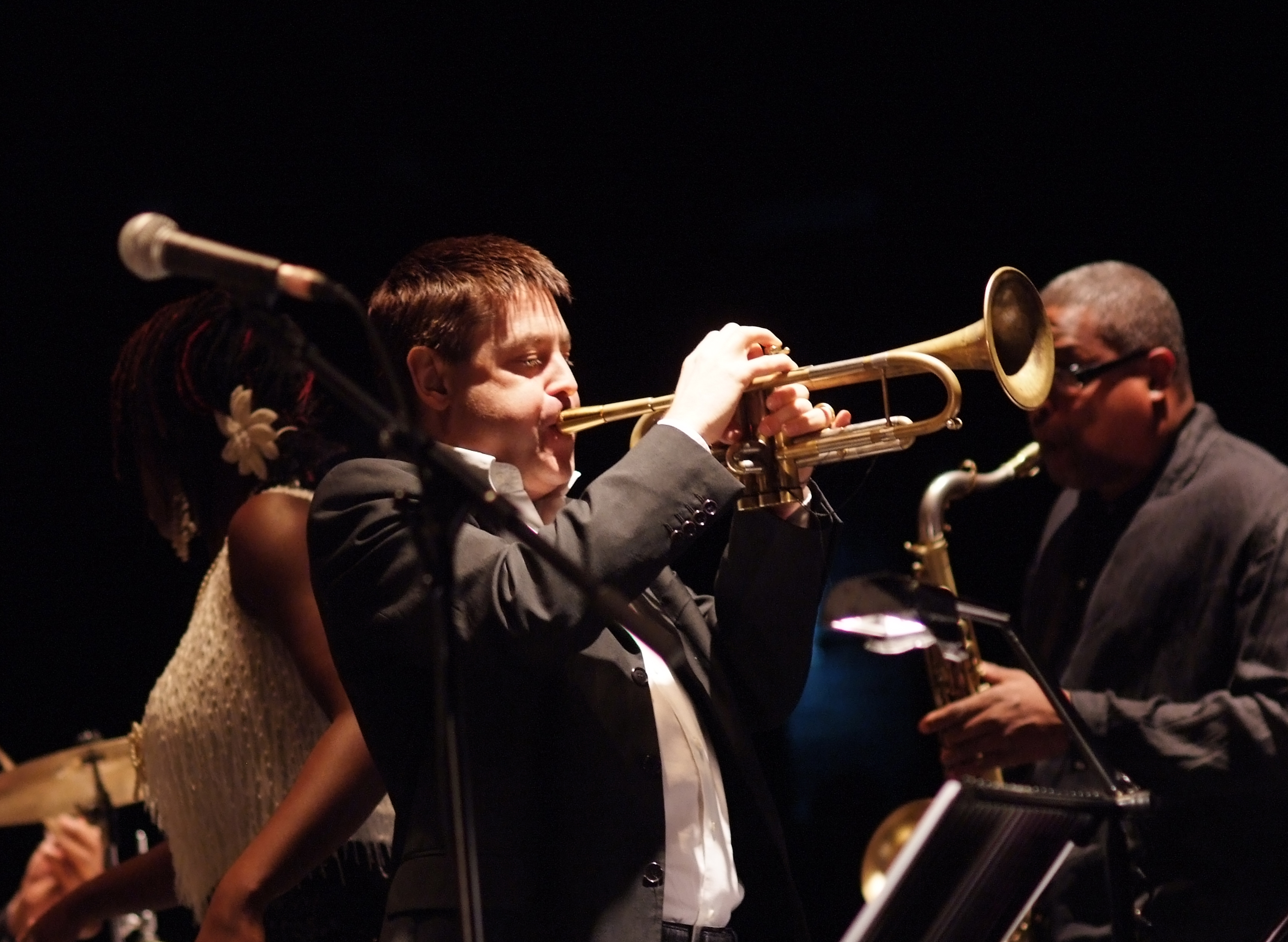
English musician Guy Barker (pictured in 2007, middle) played a trumpet solo on "Through the Years".

Impossible Princess incorporates live instrumental tracks, such as a trumpet solo by English trumpeter Guy Barker on "Through the Years". Minogue found this unusual because she was familiar only with the use of synthesizers on her tracks, and considered the album a mixture between synthetics and real instruments. The album contains several guitar-driven songs, such as "Did It Again" and "I Don't Need Anyone". "Did It Again" blends drums and electric guitar, which Smith found similar to the sound of The Beatles' Revolver (1966). "I Don't Need Anyone" is a rock song heavily influenced by Middle Eastern beats. Moore played drums and Bradfield played guitars on the joyful Britpop-style tracks "I Don't Need Anyone" and "Some Kind of Bliss". Critics compared the latter track to Motown music and the work of Manic Street Preachers.

"Cowboy Style" is a country number that was influenced by Celtic music and tribal percussion. Ian Phillips of Sputnikmusic wrote that the orchestral pop ballad "Dreams" uses a mixture of eerie-sounding strings, booming bass, and drums. Cinquemani described the chaotic drum and bass "Too Far" as a blend of crisp breakbeats, a Moby-style piano progression and lush strings; "Drunk" as a trance song; and "Limbo" as a hybrid between rock and techno in the style of The Chemical Brothers. "Jump" is a dark trip hop track, while "Say Hey" and "Breathe" are subtle electronic-infused songs. "Through the Years" contains muted horns, experimental vocal tracks and mournful lyrics; Cinquemani compared it to Björk's 1993 single "Venus as a Boy".

The record's vocals feature segments of spoken word and rapping, alongside whispering and singing. John Mangan of Australia's The Age newspaper felt the songs were tailored-made for her voice. A writer from Who noted Minogue was developing her own voice on the album, saying she is "whispering breathlessly one moment, shrieking like a young Sinéad O'Connor the next". Another writer from the same publication felt that Minogue "never sounded more human", with many songs showcasing her unique phrasing. In the biography Kylie: Naked (2012), Nigel Goodall and Jenny Stanley-Clarke likened Minogue's vocals to those of Tori Amos, Björk, Sinéad O'Connor, Kate Bush and Madonna. Cinquemani and Dwyer also compared Minogue's seductive delivery to Madonna, and described her vocals as a "sexy [and] reliable secret weapon". Larry Flick of Billboard commented that Minogue had dropped the pitch-perfect vocals and let her "odd noises flow freely" on the album.

== Themes ==
Impossible Princess deals with the theme of romantic relationships, self-discovery, emotional pain and freedom of expression. Critics and Dave Seaman noted that Minogue's personal input was more significant on this album. Most of the album is autobiographical, based upon Minogue's life during the two years preceding the album. Sean Smith believed the songs reveal her life more than any interview, as they were more "complex, serious, introspective and challenging" than the songs on her previous albums. Minogue discuss her paranoia, pain and anger in "Too Far", in which she sings in a quick, rambling way about suffering from claustrophobia. Negative stories that the British press had published about Minogue inspired "Did It Again". The track sees Minogue struggling to find the right identity. She uses an aggressive vocal style and whines about how she is messed up despite having it all. "Jump" advises the public to accept her and her personal choices throughout the course of her career.

"Did It Again"
"Did It Again" has an aggressive vocal style. Its subject is the media scrutiny Minogue had experienced.

"I Don't Need Anyone" does not have a linear storyline; the set of lyrics was taken from four songs, each interpreting a different mood and story. Cinquemani noted the energetic track sees Minogue wildly declare her independence while admitting her inborn vulnerability. "Some Kind of Bliss" talks about Minogue's experiences while away from people and being happy. Written in Japan, the fifth track, "Breathe", expresses her ability to contemplate and feel peaceful while in an intense environment. "Dreams" discussing the persistence of pushing boundaries and experimentation throughout her career. Phillips wrote that "Dreams", the closing cinematic track, tells a thought-provoking fairytale.

The record's remaining tracks discuss her relationship with Sednaoui. "Cowboy Style" details Minogue meeting Sednaoui for the first time. Minogue wrote "Limbo" in Spain, in which she discusses her inability to leave a certain country to meet someone, because of problems with its bureaucracy. Inspired by her relationship with Sednaoui, "Say Hey" highlights the need for communication, though not delving into conversation. Flick highlighted the self-examining lyrics of "Limbo" and "Say Hey", commenting that Minogue had liberated darker thoughts from her subconscious on the album. The theme of frustration lingers in "Drunk", which has Minogue feeling unsatisfied with the relationship, despite having so much feeling for someone. Minogue mentions meeting an ex-boyfriend on "Through the Years", feeling insecure and doubtful about the entire situation.

== Artwork and title ==
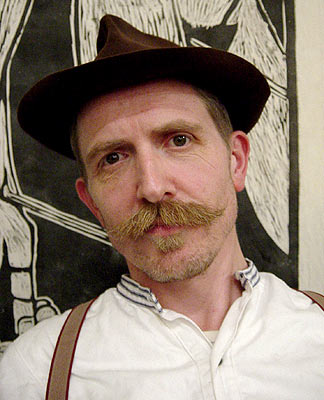
The title of the record, as well as the song "Dreams", is a reference to Billy Childish's (pictured in 2007) novel Poems to Break the Harts of Impossible Princesses (1994).

Stéphane Sednaoui shot the images and designed the cover sleeve. Inspired by French and Japanese pop culture, Sednaoui took inspiration from Nobuyoshi Araki's erotic work and tried to convey a similar aesthetic to the photos. Initially, the cover art was based on a string of experimental images of Minogue in geisha costume; the concept was later revisited for the music video of "GBI (German Bold Italic)" (1997), Minogue's collaboration with Towa Tei. The final cover depicts Minogue sitting and surrounded by swirling multi-coloured lights, dressed in a blue sleeveless Véronique Leroy minidress, with no title or name imprinted. Because Deconstruction wanted to distribute a limited-edition version of the album with a hologram sleeve, Sednaoui had to photograph separate artwork for those editions. The three dimensional lenticular sleeve required multiple static cameras to shoot Minogue in the dark. To create the long-exposure effect of the lights circulating around the singer, Sednaoui fully dressed in a black bodysuit so he could not be seen in the final shot. The shoot took a week to complete, and Minogue had to pose for hours. She remarked "the shoot was so very difficult but we knew that once we got it right it would be amazing". In 2004, Minogue donated the dress worn for the cover shot to the Cultural Gifts Program of the Arts Centre Melbourne.

The record's title is a reference to Billy Childish's 1994 book Poems to Break the Harts of Impossible Princesses. A copy of the book had been dedicated to Minogue but was accidentally passed on to Nick Cave, who eventually gave it to Minogue not long after, when she started working on the album. She recalled only looking at the title of the book and saying, "It had me written all over it." Additionally, she believed the book's poems summarised where she was at that point in her life under the spotlight. Minogue considered the title to be ironic, imaginary and that it conjured up a lot of truths from her life, saying, "Sometimes my life feels so good that it's almost too much–it's like a joke–and sometimes it should be so good... but it doesn't feel that way." The title is referenced in the chorus of the album track "Dreams".

== Release ==
Deconstruction planned to have the album out in January 1997, but postponed its release to May. Even with copies of the album already printed in mid-1997, it was delayed again to September. On 31 August 1997, Diana, Princess of Wales, was killed in a car accident. Because of the impact of her death, Minogue and Deconstruction felt the album's title was inappropriate and delayed its release for three months. The album also missed the planned January 1998 release. Frustrated with the constant delays, Minogue came to an agreement with her label to re-title it Kylie Minogue in Europe and the United Kingdom. It is her third self-titled album, following her debut in 1988 and her 1994 album. Released on 28 March 1998, the album had the original cover design; the 1997 copyright year; and Minogue's tribute to Sednaoui in the credits, despite having ended their relationship in late 1997.

"I've [been] told not to be frustrated, but I was frustrated because the album should be out. The point of it is to get it out and maybe people will like it, they may love it or they might hate it, but it was in my hands."

— Minogue discussing delays releasing the album.

On 22 October 1997, Bertelsmann Music Group (BMG) released the album in the Japanese market, which included the bonus track "Tears". The following month, Impossible Princess was produced in both CD and cassette formats in Russia and Poland. The standard edition of Impossible Princess was finally made available in Australia, New Zealand, and Japan in early January 1998, and was issued in Europe and the United Kingdom in March that year. The following month, BMG distributed it as a cassette tape in Malaysia, whilst the standard edition with new artwork was released in Taiwan. Deconstruction cancelled plans to release Impossible Princess in North America following the sudden closure of her US distributor Imago Records in late 1994.

In May 2003, Impossible Princess was remastered by Festival Mushroom in Australia and New Zealand, and BMG for European and UK regions, as a double CD album; the release contained a bonus disc featured remixes and three unreleased recordings: "Love Takes Over Me", "Tears", and "This Girl". The album re-instated the Impossible Princess title in Europe and the United Kingdom upon its re-release. In October 2022, 25 years after its original release, BMG released the album for the first time on vinyl. Using its original title Impossible Princess, the 25th Anniversary edition was reissued with three different coloured wax pressings and a limited edition Picture Disc variant.

Because of constant delays in 1997, Mushroom Records premiered six of the album tracks—"Some Kind of Bliss", "Too Far", "Say Hey", "Limbo", "I Don't Need Anyone", and "Did It Again"—on a special sample compact disc in Australia. Deconstruction conducted a similar promotional campaign in Europe and distributed six different songs on a sample cassette tape. Live and Other Sides was released accompanied by Australian releases of the album at HMV in 1998, with two unreleased Impossible Princess tracks, one unreleased Kylie Minogue track, and three live tracks. Another EP, Other Sides, featured the two B-sides, "Love Takes Over Me" and "Tears" and an unreleased Impossible Princess track, "Take Me with You". Minogue's fourth remix album, Mixes, includes singles from the album; it was released in the UK in August 1998. In Australia, the remix album was replaced by Impossible Remixes, featuring the previously unreleased "Breathe (TNT Club Mix)". Several album tracks and three unreleased tracks from Impossible Princess appear on Hits+ (2000) released in Europe.

== Promotion ==
=== Live performances and tour ===
Minogue's press campaign for the album began in mid-1997, including interviews with magazines and a performance at the Radio 1 Roadshow in Newquay on 21 August 1997. The promotional campaign was aimed at album buyers, rather than the singles market. The label stressed Minogue's wide-reaching appeal by setting up press cover interviews for her in various markets: broadsheets, dance specialists, tabloids, gay magazines, and style monthlies. During the release week in March 1998, Deconstruction and Minogue held a release party at Tower Records in London. She conducted a small-concert tour travelling to Australia, New Zealand and Hong Kong through October 1997; it was her first time in both New Zealand and Hong Kong. Minogue expanded the tour by adding venues in Norway, Denmark, and the Netherlands. She appeared on several television shows to promote the album's singles. She promoted the album at the 1998 Mardi Gras ceremony in Sydney, Australia.

In May 1998, Minogue announced the Intimate and Live concert tour, which began on 2 June at the Palais Theatre in Melbourne, Australia, that same year. Initially, she wanted to finish the tour in Melbourne on 4 July, but because of high demand in England, Minogue hosted three additional concert performances there. The tour attracted positive reviews from both attendees and publications, praising the idea of a smaller venue show. She received compliments for her vocal performance and her stage presence. Each concert had drawn in approximately 2,000 audience members in Australia, and the media there deemed it a commercial success. To complete the tour's promotion, an accompanying live album and DVD, shot at the Capitol Theatre, Sydney, were released on 30 November (album) and 23 July 2003 (DVD).

=== Singles ===
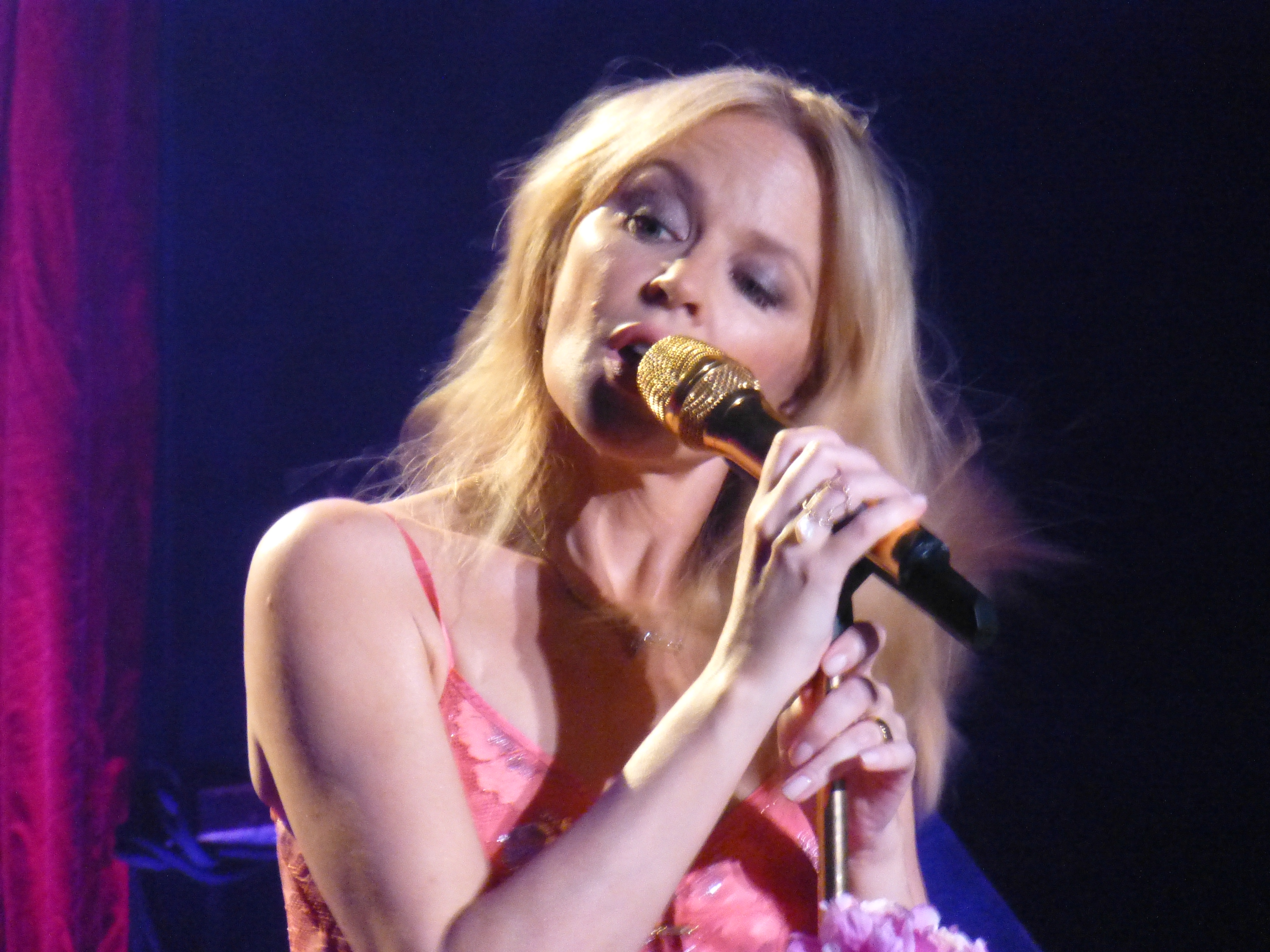
Minogue performing Impossible Princess's third single, "Breathe", on her 2018 Kylie Presents Golden promotional tour

Minogue wanted to introduce the album in a way that would intrigue and surprise the public. "Some Kind of Bliss" was chosen as the lead single in September 1997. David Mould directed the music video shot in the Desert of Tabernas in Spain; it features Dexter Fletcher as Minogue's lover. Released a week after Diana's death, "Some Kind of Bliss" was a commercial disappointment: it peaked at number 22 in the UK, Minogue's first single to not reach the top 20 there. It reached number 27 in Australia, and number 46 on the New Zealand Singles Chart, her last charting release there in the 1990s.

The second single was "Did It Again", released on 24 November 1997 with the B-side "Tears". Minogue promoted the single heavily on television in the UK, which led to it peaking at number 14 on the UK Singles Chart in December where it remained for another six weeks. In Australia, it peaked at number 15 and lasted 17 weeks in the top 50, one of her longest spanning singles on the chart. Petro Romanhi directed the accompanying music video shot in London, in which Minogue portrays four different versions of herself: SexKylie, CuteKylie, IndieKylie, and DanceKylie. "Breathe", Minogue's final single under Deconstruction, was released on 9 March 1998 featuring mixes from Sash! and Todd Terry. Welsh film director Kieran Evans directed the accompanying music video in which Minogue floats in an airspace of spiral effects. The single reached number 23 in Australia and inside the top 20 in the UK.

Because of popular demand, "Too Far" was released on 12" vinyl in May 1998 as a promotional single. Two remixes were made for the single: a Brothers in Rhythm remix that contains new vocals and adlibs from Minogue, and a Europop remix by Junior Vasquez. "Too Far" was planned to be the final single and was to be released commercially as a vinyl triple pack, but these plans were scrapped. Instead, "Cowboy Style" was released as the album's final single, with "Love Takes Over Me" on the B-side, on 5 October 1998 and distributed only in Australia. It was not released in the UK because of Minogue's departure from Deconstruction in November. Owing to a limited number of issued formats, the track only charted for a single week at number 39 on the Australian regional top 50.

== Critical reception ==
Professional ratings
Initial reviews (in 1997/1998)
Review scores
Source	Rating
Herald Sun	3/5 stars
The Guardian	3/5 stars
Music Week	4/5 stars
NME	4/10
Smash Hits	3/5 stars
Who	8/10

Professional ratings
Retrospective reviews (after 1997/1998)
Review scores
Source	Rating
AllMusic	4/5 stars
Digital Spy	4/5 stars
Encyclopedia of Popular Music	3/5 stars
Pitchfork	7.6/10
Q	2/5 stars
Slant Magazine	4/5 stars

Upon its release, critical reception of Impossible Princess was sharply divided. UK magazine Q lambasted the record's repetitious nature, while Music Week acknowledged the improvement in Minogue's vocal range and abilities. Ben Willmott of NME criticised the production of collaborator James Dean Bradfield, and labelled Minogue a "total fraud" for introducing new musical genres that were disparate from her previous work.

Some reviewers, mostly from outside of the UK, gave overwhelming praise to its production and Minogue's contribution. An editor at Who magazine and Cameron Adams of Herald Sun called it Minogue's best and most complete work, praising her vocal delivery. Mangan commended her songwriting skills and the diverse set of styles, writing that the album "sounds right and constitutes another step in the right direction." Adams opined that Minogue had produced "the classy, personal pop album she has always threatened." Dwyer highlighted the club-dance tracks as the better cuts, adding that the album shows Minogue's progress musically despite its wide range of styles and collaborators. Flick commented that Minogue "has finally found her voice—both literally and spiritually".

Retrospective reviews of Impossible Princess have been much more positive. In the Encyclopedia of Popular Music (2011), British writer Colin Larkin gave it three out of five stars, classifying it as "recommended" and "highly listenable". True found the album stronger and more natural than her previous efforts, and it flows together as an album. Cinquemani was impressed with the album's personal and unified cord, saying it is "the work of an artist willing to take risks". Levine noticed its lack of commercial appeal, while praising the diverse set genres and Minogue's input. He called the album a "brave, revealing and rarely less than surprising" piece of work. While reviewing her tenth album X (2007), Evan Sawdey of PopMatters commented that Impossible Princess is "one of the most crazed, damn-near perfect dance-pop albums ever created."

== Public reaction ==
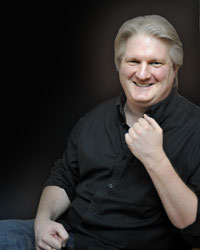
Steve Anderson felt that public perception of the album was affected by the misleading sound of the lead single.

During its commercial release, Impossible Princess was criticised by the British public, who did not appreciate Minogue's move into indie music and electronica. The audience failed to identify with her new intimate image, dubbed as "IndieKylie", and was unimpressed with her new musical direction, viewing it as a trend-chasing attempt. The backlash resulted in Impossible Princess making little impact on British record charts, which led British publications to label Impossible Princess Minogue's worst-selling album at the time in those regions. A year after its release, Virgin Radio mocked the album's sales, stating: "We've done something to improve Kylie's records: we've banned them."

Several factors were named as reasons for the poor public perception: the lack of promotional activity, the three-year gap since her last album, the constant delays and title changes, and the change of musical direction. Minogue cited the incohesive material, her "IndieKylie" image portrayed by the media, as well as the long gap between albums, as the main reasons for the album's commercial failure; while Baker felt it was the lack of proper promotion and management on Deconstruction's end. Anderson felt the release of "Some Kind of Bliss" as the lead single overshadowed Minogue's involvement on the track, and the album as a whole. Minogue said that after the single release, she had to "keep telling people that this isn't an indie-guitar album. I'm not about to pick up a guitar and rock." James Dean Bradfield admitted he felt guilty that the single release had "landed [Minogue] with a whole new set of problems".

=== Commercial performance ===
Under the title Kylie Minogue, the album debuted and peaked at number 10 on the UK Albums Chart, making it the third-highest debuting album of that week and Minogue's sixth top-10 entry. It fell to number 22 the following week and again to number 41, its final charting position was at number 70. The album sold 20,000 copies in the first two weeks of release, just ten percent of the expected sales figures. The album entered its fifth and final week, during the start of May 1998, at number 91. In a similar run, the album charted at number 10 on the Scottish Albums Chart. The album had sold 64,483 copies in the UK as of October 2020.

The album debuted and peaked at number four on the Australian Albums Chart on 25 January 1998. It stalled at number eight during its second and third weeks, but fell outside the top ten in its fourth. By 26 April, the album had spent 14 weeks on the chart and was placed at number 48 before leaving the chart. Whilst embarking on her Intimate and Live tour in June, it entered the top ten for three non-consecutive weeks between June and July. The album appeared in the top 50 for 35 weeks, making it Minogue's longest-charting album at the time. The Australian Recording Industry Association (ARIA) certified the Platinum by for physical shipments of 70,000 units.

The 2022 vinyl reissue reached number five on the UK Albums Chart on 28 October 2022, eclipsing its original number-ten peak in 1998. The album opened with 6,384 album-equivalent unit, all but 44 of which were vinyl LPs; it was the third best-selling vinyl album of the week. It was the first time the album charted under the title Impossible Princess, giving Minogue her fifteenth top-five entry. The album also reached new chart peaks in Scotland and Australia, peaking at numbers four and three, respectively.

== Accolades and impact ==
Impossible Princess gained four nominations at the 1998 ARIA Music Awards show, which was held in October. The album was nominated for Best Pop Release, Best Female Musician, and Album of the Year—her first nomination in this category. She lost Album of the Year to Unit (1997) by Regurgitator, while losing Pop Release and Female Musician to Australian singer Natalie Imbruglia. The following year, Minogue was nominated for Best Female Artist for "Cowboy Style", which lost to Imbruglia's "Wishing I Was There" (1998). The music video for "Did It Again" won the 1998 International Viewer's Choice Award – MTV Australia.

Because of pressure from the British press and public, Minogue contemplated retiring from the music industry for good. She decided instead to part with Deconstruction and BMG in November 1998. In 1999, Minogue signed to Parlophone and released her album Light Years in 2000 to a positive reception. The Guardian's Tim Jonze believes that Light Years saved her career, while Louise Bruton of The Irish Times, said that Impossible Princess is the low point "she needed to reach the great heights of 2000's Light Years". Minogue has considered Impossible Princess the most disappointing moment in her career, and commented that if she wrote another album of personal songs, "it would be seen as Impossible Princess 2 and be equally critiqued".

Retrospectively, the album has been regarded by music critics as Minogue's most personal and misunderstood work. True and Cinquemani applauded her writing contribution, calling it her "great leap forward" in terms of musical composition. On the 20th anniversary of the album, Ben Neutze of Daily Review opined that it stands as "the most intriguing chapter of her career, and the only significant glimpse at who this pop icon might be when stripped of other glorious facades." Caz Tran of ABC Online called it "the creative detour [Minogue] needed to take" regarding her evolution and self-discovery. Levine and Larrisa Dubecki of The Age viewed the album as one of the key re-inventions of her recording career. Several critics noticed the sonic and lyrical similarities between the album and Ray of Light (1998) by Madonna. Cinquemani observed that despite the success of Ray of Light, Impossible Princess brought a harsh reaction from the public. Owen Myers of Pitchfork described both albums, alongside Janet Jackson's The Velvet Rope (1997), as "a trilogy of A-list experimental pop records in 1997-8 that addressed their artists' fears, anxieties, and dreams." Media publications Flavorwire, Slant Magazine, and Faster Louder listed the album as one of the most underrated pop albums.

== Track listing ==
Impossible Princess – Standard version
No.	Title	Lyrics	Music	Producer(s)	Length
1.	"Too Far"	Kylie Minogue	Minogue	Minogue^{[a]}; Brothers in Rhythm	4:43
2.	"Cowboy Style"	Minogue	Minogue; Steve Anderson; Dave Seaman	Brothers in Rhythm	4:44
3.	"Some Kind of Bliss"	Minogue	Minogue; James Dean Bradfield; Sean Moore	Bradfield; Dave Eringa	4:13
4.	"Did It Again"	Minogue	Minogue; Anderson; Seaman	Brothers in Rhythm	4:22
5.	"Breathe"	Minogue	Minogue; Dave Ball; Ingo Vauk	Minogue^{[a]}; Ball; Vauk	4:38
6.	"Say Hey"	Minogue	Minogue	Minogue^{[a]}; Brothers in Rhythm	3:37
7.	"Drunk"	Minogue	Minogue; Anderson; Seaman	Brothers in Rhythm	3:59
8.	"I Don't Need Anyone"	Minogue; Nick Jones	Minogue; Bradfield; Jones	Bradfield; Eringa	3:13
9.	"Jump"	Minogue	Minogue; Rob Dougan	Dougan; Jay Burnett^{[b]}	4:03
10.	"Limbo"	Minogue	Minogue; Ball; Vauk	Ball; Vauk	4:05
11.	"Through the Years"	Minogue	Ball; Vauk	Ball; Vauk	4:20
12.	"Dreams"	Minogue	Minogue; Anderson; Seaman	Brothers in Rhythm	3:44
Total length:					49:41

Impossible Princess – Japanese edition bonus track
No.	Title	Writer(s)	Producer(s)	Length
13.	"Tears"	Minogue; Ball; Vauk	Ball; Vauk	4:26
Total length:				54:07

Impossible Princess – Special edition bonus disc
No.	Title	Writer(s)	Producer(s)	Length
1.	"Love Takes Over Me"	Minogue; Anderson; Seaman	Brothers in Rhythm	4:17
2.	"Too Far" (Inner Door Mix)	Minogue	Minogue^{[a]}; Brothers in Rhythm; Philip Steir^{[c]}	6:17
3.	"Did It Again" (Did It Four Times Mix)	Minogue; Anderson; Seaman	Brothers in Rhythm; Steir^{[c]}	5:48
4.	"Breathe" (Tee's Dancehall Mix)	Minogue; Ball; Vauk	Minogue^{[a]}; Ball; Vauk; Todd Terry^{[c]}	6:20
5.	"Tears"	Minogue; Ball; Vauk	Ball; Vauk	4:26
6.	"Too Far" (Junior's Riff Dub)	Minogue	Minogue^{[a]}; Brothers in Rhythm; Junior Vasquez^{[c]}	5:47
7.	"Breathe" (Tee's Dub of Life)	Minogue; Ball; Vauk	Minogue^{[a]}; Ball; Vauk; Terry^{[c]}	7:54
8.	"Some Kind of Bliss" (Quivver Mix)	Bradfield; Minogue; Moore	Bradfield; Eringa; John Graham^{[c]}	8:39
9.	"Did It Again" (Razor-n-Go Dub)	Minogue; Anderson; Seaman	Brothers in Rhythm; Razor-n-Go^{[c]}	9:51
10.	"Breathe" (Tee's Glimmer Mix)	Minogue; Ball; Vauk	Minogue^{[a]}; Ball; Vauk; Terry^{[c]}	4:44
11.	"Too Far" (North Pole Mix)	Minogue	Minogue^{[a]}; Brothers in Rhythm; Steir^{[c]}	5:42
12.	"This Girl"	Minogue; Uschi Classen		3:08
Total length:				72:53

Notes

- ^{^a} signifies a producer, but unaccredited towards the album.
- ^{^b} signifies a co-producer.
- ^{^c} signifies a remix producer.

== Personnel ==
Adapted from the album's liner notes.

- Kylie Minogue – lead vocals, backing vocals, synthesizer, production, composition
- Steve Anderson – drum programming, grand piano, guitar, Hammond B3, keyboards, string arrangements
- Dave Ball – production
- Gini Ball – string arrangements
- Guy Barker – trumpet
- Geoff Bird – guitar
- Greg Bone – guitar
- James Dean Bradfield – bass, guitar, production
- Alan Bremmer – engineer, mixing, programming
- Brothers in Rhythm – production
- Livingstone Brown – bass
- Jay Burnett – co-production
- Simon Clarke – flute, saxophone
- Rob Dougan – production
- Andy Duncan – percussion
- Dave Eringa – production, string arrangements
- Farrow Design – art direction
- Johnnie Hardy – fiddle
- Sally Herbert – strings, string arrangements
- Bogislaw Kostecki – fiddle
- Peter Lale – viola
- Sunny Lizic – engineering
- Roddie Lorimer – trumpet
- Martin Loveday – cello
- Richard Lowe – mix engineering, engineering
- Wil Malone – string arrangements
- Sean Moore – drums
- Nick Nasmyth – keyboards, string arrangements
- Claire Orsler – string arrangements
- Jocelyn Pook – string arrangements
- Tim Sanders – saxophone
- Stéphane Sednaoui – photography
- Steve Sidelnyk – drums, percussion
- Neil Sidwell – trombone
- Anne Stephenson – string arrangements
- Ingo Vauk – production
- Steve Walters – bass
- Gavyn Wright – orchestra lead, violin
- Paul Wright – engineering
- Ben Findlay – sound engineer (Real World)
- Emma Jones – studio assistant (Real World)

== Charts ==
=== Weekly charts ===
Chart performance for Impossible Princess in 1998
Chart (1998)	Peak position
Australian Albums (ARIA)	4
European Albums (Music & Media)	39
German Albums (Offizielle Top 100)	78
Scottish Albums (OCC)	10
UK Albums (OCC)	10

Chart performance for Impossible Princess in 2022
Chart (2022)	Peak position
Australian Albums (ARIA)	3
Belgian Albums (Ultratop Flanders)	57
Belgian Albums (Ultratop Wallonia)	32
German Albums (Offizielle Top 100)	25
Italian Vinyl Records (FIMI)	7
Scottish Albums (OCC)	4
Spanish Albums (Promusicae)	25
Swiss Albums (Schweizer Hitparade)	55
Swiss Albums (Les charts Romandy)	45
UK Albums (OCC)	5
UK Independent Albums (Official Charts)	3
US Top Album Sales (Billboard)	71

=== Year-end charts ===
Year-end chart performance for Impossible Princess
Chart (1998)	Position
Australian Albums (ARIA)	31

Chart (2022)	Position
Australian Vinyl Albums (ARIA)	43

== Certifications and sales ==
Certification and sales for Impossible Princess
Region	Certification	Certified units/sales
Australia (ARIA)	Platinum	70,000^{^}
United Kingdom	—	72,800
^{^} Shipments figures based on certification alone.

== Release history ==
Release dates and formats for Impossible Princess
Region	Date	Title	Format	Edition	Label	Ref(s).
Japan	22 October 1997	Impossible Princess	CD	Bonus edition	BMG	
Russia	22 October 1997	Impossible Princess	CD	Standard edition	Deconstruction	
Poland	22 October 1997	Impossible Princess	Cassette tape	Standard edition	Deconstruction	
Australia	12 January 1998	Impossible Princess	CD	Standard edition; lenticular edition	Mushroom	
New Zealand	12 January 1998	Impossible Princess	CD	Standard edition; lenticular edition	Mushroom	
Japan	12 January 1998	Impossible Princess	CD	Standard edition; lenticular edition	Mushroom	
United Kingdom	28 March 1998	Kylie Minogue	CD	Standard edition; lenticular edition	Deconstruction	
Europe	28 March 1998	Kylie Minogue	CD	Standard edition; lenticular edition	Deconstruction	
Malaysia	28 March 1998	Impossible Princess	Cassette tape	Standard edition	BMG	
Taiwan	28 March 1998	Impossible Princess	CD	Standard edition	BMG	
Australia	23 May 2003	Impossible Princess	CD	Special double disc edition	Festival Mushroom	
New Zealand	23 May 2003	Impossible Princess	CD	Special double disc edition	Festival Mushroom	
United Kingdom	23 May 2003	Impossible Princess	CD	Special double disc edition	BMG	
Japan	2003	Impossible Princess	CD	Special double disc edition	Deconstruction	
Worldwide	18 November 2008	Impossible Princess	Digital download	Standard edition	Mushroom	
Worldwide	18 November 2008	Impossible Princess	Digital download	Special edition	BMG	
Worldwide	21 October 2022	Impossible Princess	LP; Picture disc	25th Anniversary edition	BMG	

== See also ==
- List of top 25 albums for 1998 in Australia
- List of UK top-ten albums in 1998
- List of works with different titles in the United Kingdom and United States
- List of musical works released in a stem format
