= Too Far =

1997 promotional single by Kylie Minogue

- Side A of UK promo release

Promotional single by Kylie Minogue

from the album Impossible Princess
- Released: 24 September 1997
- Studio: Real World (Wiltshire, England), DMC (London, England)
- Genre: Drum and bass; breakbeat
- Length: 4:44
- Label: BMG; Deconstruction; Mushroom
- Songwriter: Kylie Minogue
- Producers: Kylie Minogue; Brothers in Rhythm

Audio video
- "Too Far" on YouTube

"Too Far" is a song by Australian recording artist Kylie Minogue, taken from her sixth studio album Impossible Princess (1997). It was written and produced by Minogue, with additional production credits to Brothers in Rhythm. The song is a drum and bass song where Minogue describes her anger and frustration through its lyrics. It contains elements of club music and breakbeat music, and employs spoken word techniques.

"Too Far" has been universally acclaimed; some critics favoured its commercial appeal, while some felt it was one of Minogue's best dance tracks. Critics have highlighted it as an album and career stand out. "Too Far" failed to chart on any record charts, and no music video was filmed. Minogue has performed the track on two of her concert tours, Intimate and Live Tour and Showgirl: The Homecoming Tour, and it has been included on her greatest hits albums including Artist Collection (2004) and Confide in Me: The Irresistible Kylie (2007).

== Background and release ==
"Too Far" was one of the first tracks written for Minogue's sixth album, Impossible Princess. Minogue stated that she left her home for an entire day, and stayed at a local cafe for the morning to write the song's lyrics. Minogue felt that her home was a "negative atmosphere", and wanted to "get rid of bad energy". She later stated that she wrote the song "very quickly and at a very bad state." Minogue stated that the lyric "Caught up in this house, trapped my very own self in the snare of my mind," explained her "very well at the time". Minogue felt the lyrics were claustrophobic-like, feeling that she "couldn't find a way out". Although Minogue commented the song was "nothing I have ever done before," she felt the song was a "good form of release" of emotions. Interviewed with the magazine Music Week, Minogue reiterated that it was "the strangest thing I have ever written."

Originally, Minogue wanted to release "Limbo" as the lead single because she felt it was a "good choice", but her creative director Steve Anderson felt either "Too Far" or "Jump" were better offerings to promote Impossible Princess. Deconstruction reviewed both their views, but did not promote any them and released "Some Kind of Bliss" as the lead single; "Limbo" appeared as its b-side. In January 1998, "Too Far", alongside five other album tracks, were included on an exclusive cassette tape and given to Deconstruction members to select their opinion on which should be the third single; "Too Far" lost respectively to "Breathe".

Following the release of Impossible Princess, popular reception towards "Too Far" and demand for a release soon prompt Deconstruction to announce the track as the album's fourth single. However, Minogue's distribution label Sony BMG released "Too Far" themselves, both as a promotional vinyl and airplay single in the UK on 21 May 1998, and later North America on 26 May, her first single released in the US since her 1994 hit "Confide in Me". The song in its original album length was only released as airplay and excluded from the 12" release, instead it being occupied by two new remixes commissioned by Brothers in Rhythm and Junior Vasquez. Deconstruction then called off the single's promotion, and refused to promote it further after BMG released it without discussion.

== Composition ==
Minogue co-produced/composed it with British duo Brothers in Rhythm. The song was recorded at DMC Studios, Real World Studios and Sarm West Studios in London, England during 1997. Steve Anderson played synthesizers, keyboards and drum machines, Boguaslaw Kostecki played the fiddle, Pete Lale and Martin Loveday incorporated string arrangements, and Minogue played the grand piano. Primarily a drum and bass song, it also contains elements of house and breakbeat. A reviewer from X-Press Magazine said "With all these tracks along with the speaking in toungues-style opening of "Too Far", Kylie shows she's open to moving on and widening her pop arc."

== Critical reception ==
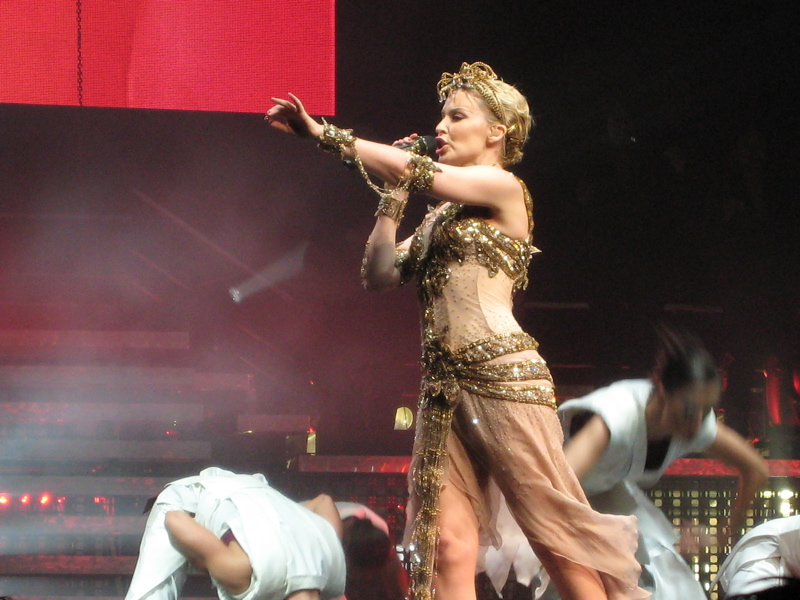
Minogue performing "Too Far" during her Showgirl: The Homecoming tour (2007)

"Too Far" achieved universal acclaim. Chris True from Allmusic had highlighted the track as an album stand out from Impossible Princess. Sarah Smith from FasterLouder.com highlighted the song as an album stand out and praised Minogue's experimentation on the "spoken word" effect. Gary James from Entertainment Focus praised all her written tracks and had especially praised "Say Hey", "Too Far", "Cowboy Style" and "Limbo" for her being able to portray a "sense of claustrophobia and uncertainty." A reviewer from Who was positive, stating "As epic an opening as "Confide in Me" was to Kylie Minogue. A rich, rambling, speedy, chaotic onslaught whose composition is credited solely to one K.Minogue."

Susan Corrigan from I-D had said positively stated that "Too Far" "shimmer[ed]". Robin Bresnek from Melody Maker had discussed their parent review, and said that "Too Far" and "Drunk" were immediate highlights for Minogue showing her "schizophrenic self-disgust" nature that "spins dizzily in the shadow of fluttering heartbeats and inspired rushes of sound." Sam Upton from Select magazine was particularly positive towards the track, saying "'Too Far' sets out the stall perfectly with beats that want to be jungle when they grow up and Kylie slipping between half-rap and the usual sensual breathing's." Upton, however, gave the parent album an overall mixed review. Larry Flick from Billboard commented "From the haunting, almost unsettling drum'n'bass undertow of the set's lead cut, "Too Far," it's clear that the days of kewpie-doll ditties like "The Loco-Motion" and "Better the Devil You Know" have dissolved into a gratefully distant memory."

Additionally, the Brothers in Rhythm remix of "Too Far" received favourable reviews from most music critics, and became popular with clubs and fans alike. Reviewing Mixes, Charlie Porter from Amazon.co.uk was positive towards the remix, stating "Brothers in Rhythm work their slinky magic on "Too Far", and further highlighted it as a stand out track.

== Live performances ==
Minogue included "Too Far" on a musical medley that contained several songs from her back catalog on the Mushroom 25 Live Tour on 14 November 1998; it was later included on a live CD release. Minogue has performed the track on one of her concert tours; the Showgirl: The Homecoming Tour. In 2005, Minogue went on her Showgirl: The Greatest Hits Tour. Minogue was unable to complete the tour as she was diagnosed with early breast cancer and had to cancel the Australian leg of the tour. After undergoing treatment and recovery, she resumed the concert tour in the form of Showgirl: The Homecoming Tour in 2007, and included "Too Far" on the setlist.

Minogue also performed a mash-up of both the Brothers in Rhythm remix and the original on her Intimate and Live concert tour, and featured Minogue rising up on the stage inside a rainbow-colored cone, similar to the artwork of the parent album, wearing black overalls. Like the rest of the costumes on the tour, it features Minogue with a "princess"-inspired outfit that were created by her and her long-time friend and Fashion designer William Baker. The performance was recorded on 30 June and 1 July at Capitol Theatre in Sydney, and appeared on the related CD and DVD.

== Legacy ==
"Too Far" has been featured on many of Minogue's compilation albums; first appearing on her 2002 BMG greatest hits compilation album Confide in Me, a compilation of her songs from her Deconstruction period. It then appeared on her 2004 compilation album Artist Collection, which included most of her Impossible Princess era. The track's last appearance was on the first disc of Confide in Me: The Irresistible Kylie released in July 2007 by UK independent label Music Club.

With the reissue of Impossible Princess in 2003, a second disc containing various remixes and b-sides was included. Among these remixes are two brand new ones of "Too Far" by Philip Steir: the "Inner Door Mix", and the "North Pole Mix". Additionally, the previously unreleased "Junior's Riff Dub" was included as well.

== Track listing ==
Promotional 12" vinyl

1. "Too Far (Brothers in Rhythm Mix)" – 10:21
2. "Too Far (Junior Vasquez Remix)" – 11:44

== Remixes ==
Brothers in Rhythm Mixes

- "Too Far (Brothers in Rhythm Mix)" – 10:21
- "Too Far (Brothers in Rhythm Dub)" – 8:39

Junior Vasquez Mixes

- "Too Far (Junior Vasquez Remix)" – 11:44
- "Too Far (Junior's Riff Dub)" – 5:50

Philip Steir Mixes

- "Too Far (Inner Door Mix)" – 6:22
- "Too Far (North Pole Mix)" – 5:47

== Personnel ==
Credits adapted from the album's liner notes and the singer's official website.

- Songwriting – Kylie Minogue
- Production – Brothers in Rhythm
- Vocals production – Minogue
- Recording – Alan Bremner and Paul Wright; DMC Studios, Real World Studios and Sarm West Studios, London, England. 1997
- Keyboards, synthesizers, other instruments – Steve Anderson
- Fiddle – Bougaslaw Kostecki
- Viola – Pete Lale
- Cello – Martin Loveday
- Mixing, engineering – Alan Bremner
- Mixing – Paul Wright

== Release history ==
Release dates and formats for "Too Far"
Region	Date	Format	Label(s)	Ref.
Australia	24 September 1997	Contemporary hit radio	Mushroom Records	
New Zealand	24 September 1997	Contemporary hit radio	Mushroom Records	
United Kingdom	2 January 1998	Contemporary hit radio	Deconstruction Records	
United Kingdom	21 May 1998	Vinyl	Deconstruction Records	
North America	2 January 1998	Vinyl	Sony BMG	
