= List of artists with the most UK Albums Chart top tens =

The UK Albums Chart is a weekly record chart compiled by Official Charts, which for most of its history was based on album sales from Sunday to Saturday in the United Kingdom. The chart was founded in 1956 and began with a top five being unveiled. It was extended to a top ten from November 1958 onwards. It compiled physical format album sales until 2007, after which it has also included albums sold digitally. Since March 2015, it has incorporated music streaming service data. From 10 July 2015, it has been based on a Friday to Thursday album sales.

This list shows the eighteen artists with the most top-ten albums on the UK Albums Chart. American singer-actor Elvis Presley holds the record for the most top-ten albums with fifty-three entries.

== Tally ==
Artists with the most top-ten albums in the UK Albums Chart
Number of entries	Artist	Year first entered chart	First entry (peak position)	Year most recently entered chart	Most recent entry (peak position)	Ref.
53	Elvis Presley	1956	Elvis Presley Rock n' Roll (1)	2018	Where No One Stands Alone (9)	
48	Cliff Richard	1959	Cliff (4)	2023	Cliff with Strings – My Kinda Life (5)	
43	The Rolling Stones	1964	The Rolling Stones (1)	2026	Foreign Tongues (1)	
42	Bob Dylan	1964	The Freewheelin' Bob Dylan (1)	2023	The Bootleg Series Vol. 17: Fragments – Time Out of Mind Sessions (1996–1997) (9)	
40	Frank Sinatra	1956	Songs for Swingin' Lovers! (1)	2008	Nothing but the Best (10)	
39	Rod Stewart	1971	Every Picture Tells a Story (1)	2025	Ultimate Hits (5)	
36	David Bowie	1972	The Rise and Fall of Ziggy Stardust and the Spiders from Mars (5)	2023	Ziggy Stardust and The Spiders from Mars: The Motion Picture (10)	
34	The Beatles	1963	Please Please Me (1)	2016	Live at the Hollywood Bowl (3)	
34	Elton John	1970	Elton John (5)	2025	Who Believes in Angels? (1)	
28	Queen	1974	Queen II (5)	2024	Queen (10)	
24	Bruce Springsteen	1980	The River (2)	2025	Tracks II: The Lost Albums (2)	
24	Paul Weller	1992	Paul Weller (8)	2025	Find El Dorado (5)	
24	Madonna	1984	Madonna (6)	2026	Confessions II (1)	
23	Paul McCartney	1970	McCartney (2)	2026	The Boys of Dungeon Lane (1)	
22	Kylie Minogue	1988	Kylie (1)	2025	Kylie Christmas (Fully Wrapped) (1)	
21	Genesis	1973	Genesis Live (9)	2021	The Last Domino? – The Hits (9)	
20	Pink Floyd	1967	The Piper at the Gates of Dawn (6)	2025	Pink Floyd at Pompeii – MCMLXXII (1)	
20	Michael Jackson	1979	Off the Wall (3)	2026	Michael (4)	
