= List of artists who reached number one on the album chart in Ireland =

This is a list of recording artists who have reached number one on the album chart in Ireland since January 2003.

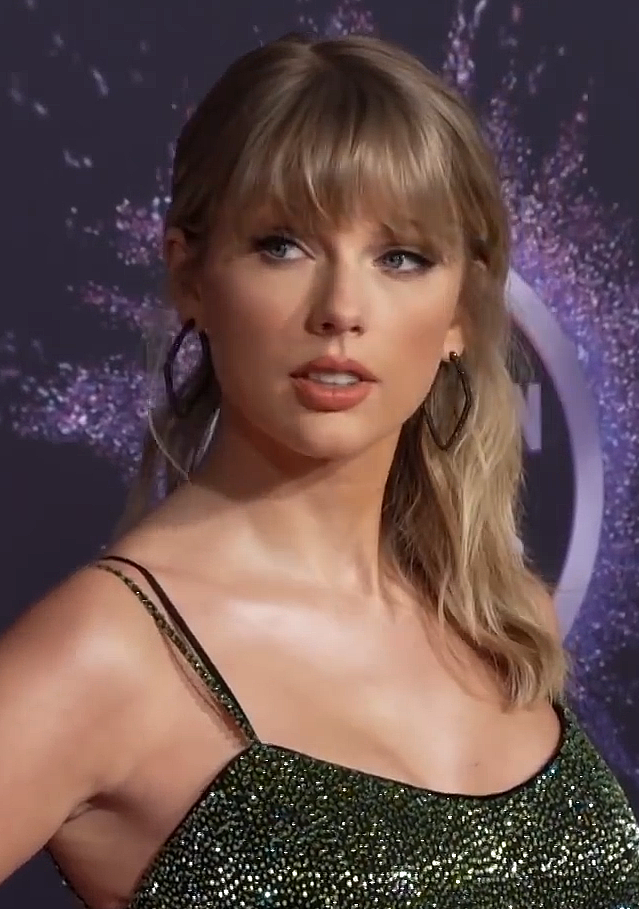
Taylor Swift holds the record for the most number-one albums on the Irish album charts with 12.

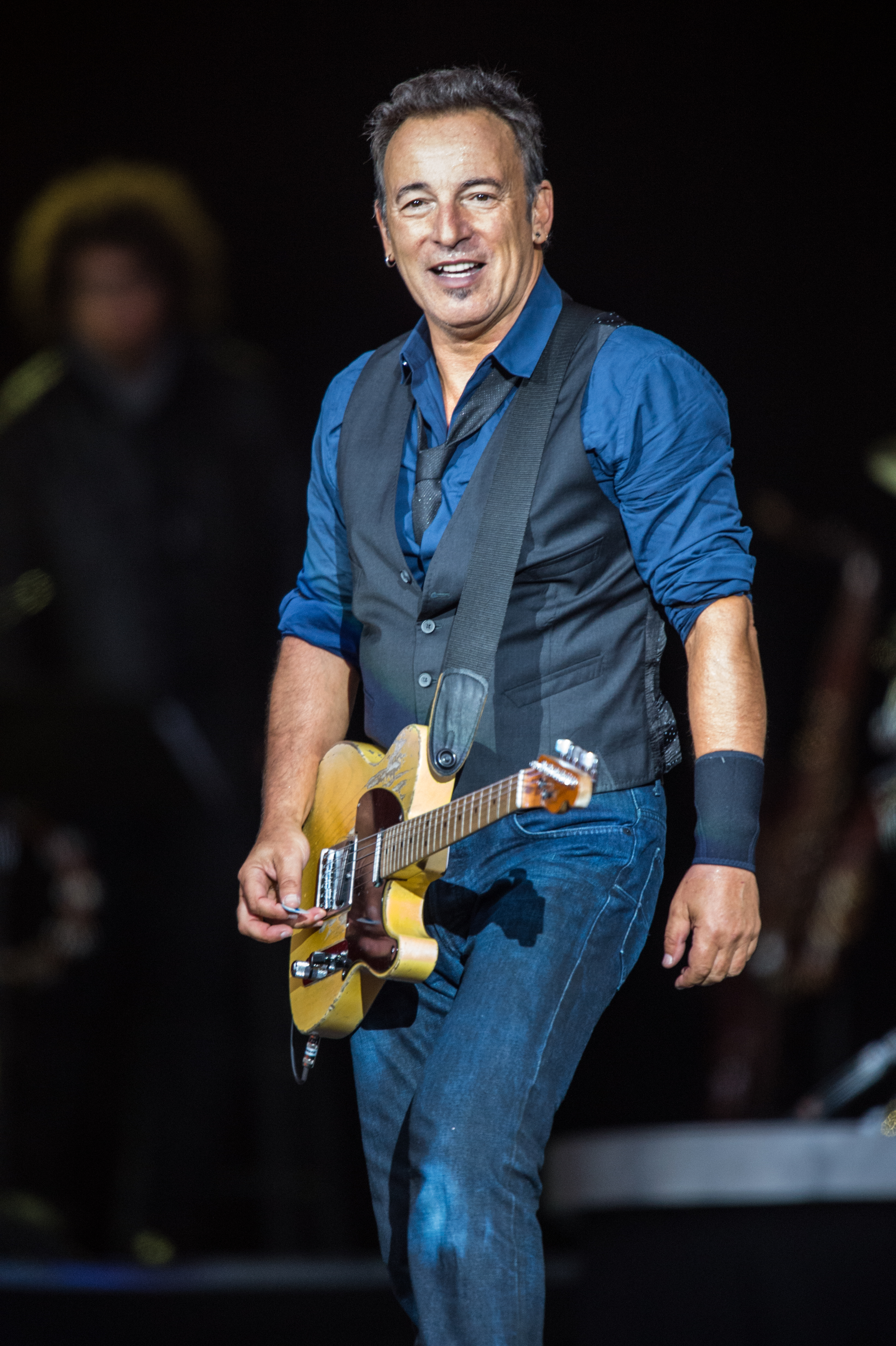
Bruce Springsteen holds the record for the most number-one albums on the Irish album charts by a male artist with 10.

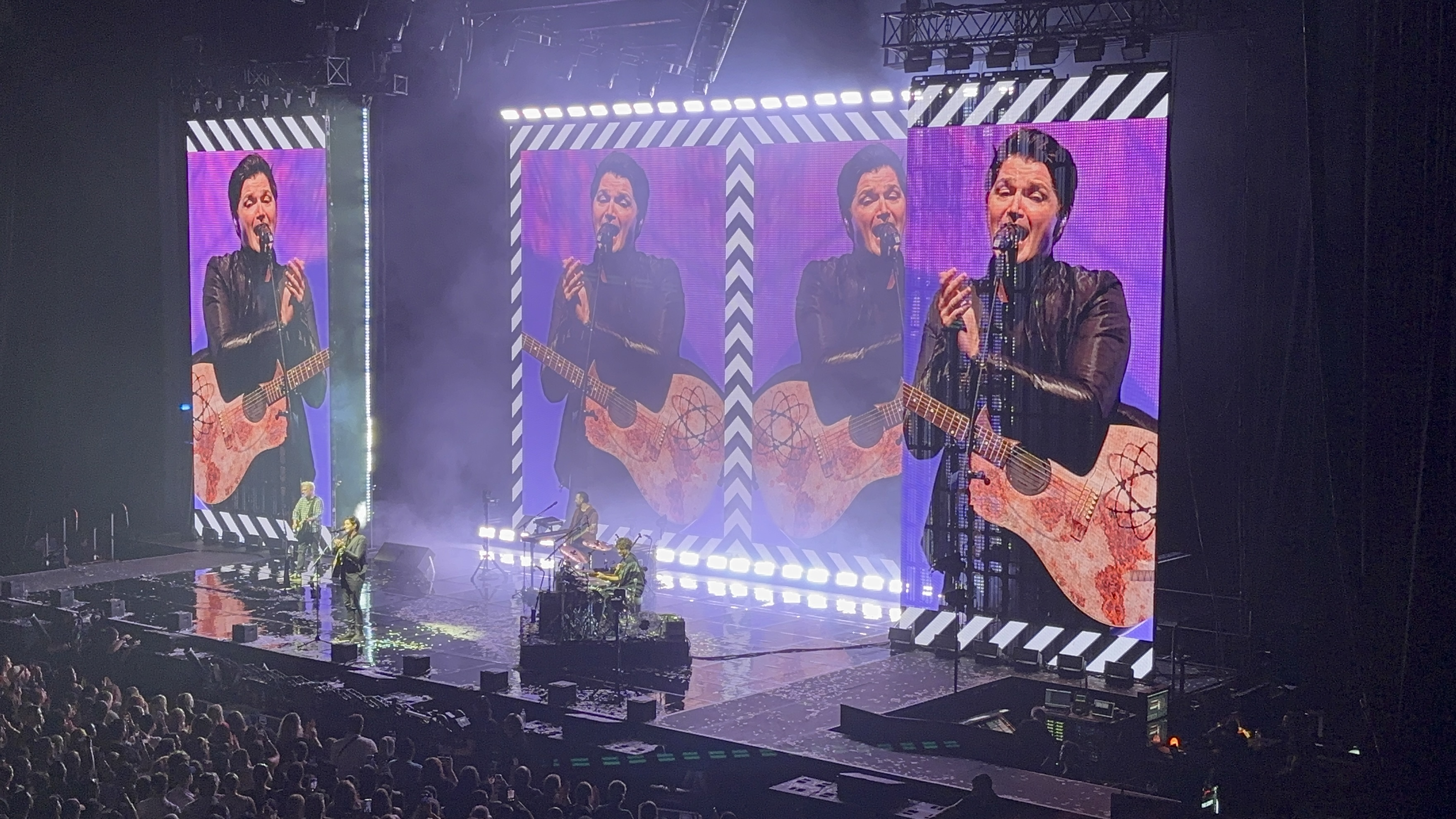
The Script holds the record for the most number-one albums on the Irish album charts by a band and by Irish artist with 9.

- All acts are listed alphabetically.
- Solo artists are alphabetised by last name (unless they use only their first name, e.g. Akon, listed under A), Groups by group name excluding "A," "An" and "The."

== 0-9 ==
- The 2 Johnnies (1)
- 5 Seconds of Summer (2)
- The 1975 (1)
- 50 Cent (2)

== A ==
- ABBA (2)
- Andy Abraham (1)
- Gracie Abrams (1)
- AC/DC (3)
- The Academic (2)
- Adele (3)
- Christina Aguilera (1)
- Air (1)
- Amble (1)
- Arcade Fire (5)
- Arctic Monkeys (4)
- Aslan (1)
- Avenged Sevenfold (1)

== B ==
- Tom Baxter (1)
- James Bay (1)
- Bee Gees (1)
- Bell X1 (3)
- Beyoncé (6)
- Biffy Clyro (1)
- Justin Bieber (4)
- Mary Black (1)
- James Blunt (2)
- Blur (2)
- Bruno Mars (1)
- Andrea Bocelli (1)
- Matteo Bocelli (1)
- Virginia Bocelli (1)
- Bon Jovi (1)
- David Bowie (2)
- Boygenius (1)
- Susan Boyle (1)
- Boyzone (1)
- Niall Breslin (1)
- Garth Brooks (1)
- Zach Bryan (2)
- BTS (3)
- Michael Bublé (4)
- Jeff Buckley (1)
- Mary Byrne (1)

== C ==
- Lewis Capaldi (2)
- Nathan Carter (5)
- Sabrina Carpenter (2)
- Cascada (1)
- Paddy Casey (1)
- Johnny Cash (2)
- Central Cee (1)
- Nick Cave and the Bad Seeds (1)
- Christine and the Queens (1)
- Gerry Cinnamon (1)
- Kelly Clarkson (1)
- CMAT (3)
- Leonard Cohen (1)
- Coldplay (6)
- J. Cole (1)
- The Corrs (2)
- The Coronas (4)
- Miley Cyrus (2)

== D ==
- D12 (1)
- Daft Punk (1)
- Damien Dempsey (3)
- Dave (1)
- Cathy Davey (1)
- Olivia Dean (1)
- Lana Del Rey (3)
- Mike Denver (1)
- Dido (1)
- Celine Dion (1)
- Dr. Dre (1)
- Drake (5)
- Duffy (1)
- Bob Dylan (2)
- Cian Ducrot (1)

== E ==
- Billie Eilish (3)
- Elbow (2)
- Eminem (8)

== F ==
- Faithless (1)
- Fatboy Slim (1)
- Shane Filan (1)
- Mick Flannery (3)
- Florence and the Machine (2)
- Foo Fighters (2)
- Fontaines D.C. (2)
- The Frames (2)

== G ==
- Lady Gaga (5)
- Liam Gallagher (3)
- Glee Cast (4)
- Ariana Grande (6)
- David Gray (1)
- Green Day (2)
- The Gloaming (1)
- Gorillaz (2)
- Ellie Goulding (1)
- Guns N' Roses (1)

== H ==
- Ham Sandwich (1)
- Lisa Hannigan (2)
- Mickey Joe Harte (1)
- Christie Hennessy (1)
- Niall Horan (4)
- Whitney Houston (1)
- Hozier (3)
- Hudson Taylor (1)

== I ==
- Inhaler (3)
- Interpol (1)

== J ==
- J. Cole (1)
- Michael Jackson (2)
- Jedward (3)
- Gavin James (3)
- JLS (1)
- Billy Joel (1)
- Jack Johnson (1)
- Norah Jones (2)
- Juice Wrld (1)

== K ==
- Noah Kahan (2)
- Keane (2)
- Ronan Keating (1)
- Dermot Kennedy (3)
- Keywest (1)
- The Killers (5)
- Kingfishr (1)
- Kings of Leon (6)
- David Kitt (1)
- Kneecap (1)
- Kodaline (3)
- KSI (1)

== L ==
- Kendrick Lamar (2)
- Avril Lavigne (3)
- Leona Lewis (1)
- Lil Nas X (1)
- Linkin Park (2)
- Dua Lipa (1)
- Little Mix (3)
- Little Green Cars (1)
- Lyra (1)

== M ==
- Madonna (3)
- Post Malone (2)
- Marina and the Diamonds (1)
- Maroon 5 (1)
- Massive Attack (2)
- Imelda May (4)
- Tate McRae (2)
- Meat Loaf (1)
- Shawn Mendes (1)
- Metallica (4)
- George Michael (1)
- Kylie Minogue (1)
- Moncrieff (1)
- Christy Moore (4)
- James Morrison (1)
- James Vincent McMorrow (1)
- Mumford & Sons (3)
- Mundy (1)
- The Murder Capital (1)
- George Murphy (1)
- Muse (3)

== N ==
- The National (2)
- Noel Gallagher's High Flying Birds (2)
- Paolo Nutini (4))

== O ==
- Sinéad O'Connor (1)
- Ryan O'Shaughnessy (1)
- Oasis (2)
- Of Monsters & Men (1)
- One Direction (4)
- Original Motion Picture Cast (1)

== P ==
- Paramore (2)
- Paul Potts (1)
- Pearl Jam (1)
- Katy Perry (2)
- Picture This (3)
- Pink (3)
- Pink Floyd (1)
- Robert Plant (1)
- Planxty (1)
- Pop Smoke (1)
- The Priests (1)

== Q ==
- Queens of the Stone Age (1)
- Eoghan Quigg (1)

== R ==
- R.E.M. (3)
- Radiohead (4)
- Rag'n'Bone Man (1)
- Red Hot Chili Peppers (4)
- Damien Rice (3)
- Rihanna (3)
- The Riptide Movement (1)
- Chappell Roan (1)
- Olivia Rodrigo (3)
- Rodrigo y Gabriela (1)
- The Rolling Stones (1)
- Mario Rosenstock (2)
- Royal Blood (2)
- Derek Ryan (2)

== S ==
- Sam Smith (3)
- Emeli Sandé (1)
- Sandi Thom (1)
- Scissor Sisters (2)
- Travis Scott (1)
- The Script (9)
- Shakira (1)
- Sharon Shannon (1)
- Ed Sheeran (7)
- Ryan Sheridan (1)
- Sigur Rós (1)
- Slipknot (1)
- Snow Patrol (5)
- Britney Spears (3)
- Bruce Springsteen (10)
- John Squire (1)
- Stereophonics (2)
- Rod Stewart (1)
- Stormzy (1)
- The Streets (1)
- Harry Styles (4)
- The Strypes (1)
- Taylor Swift (12)

== T ==
- Take That (4)
- The Thrills (2)
- Justin Timberlake (3)
- Timbaland (1)
- Traveling Wilburys (1)
- Travis and Elzzz (1)
- Travy (1)
- Two Door Cinema Club (1)
- Tyler, the Creator (1)

== U ==
- U2 (6)
- Usher (1)

== V ==
- Villagers (3)

== W ==
- Walking on Cars (1)
- Shayne Ward (2)
- Alex Warren (1)
- The Weeknd (4)
- Kanye West (2)
- Westlife (7)
- Robbie Williams (6)
- Amy Winehouse (1)

== X ==
- Charli XCX (2)
- The xx (1)

== Y ==
- Years & Years (1)
- Yungblud (1)

== See also ==
- Irish Albums Chart
- List of artists who reached number one in Ireland
