= Boombox (Kylie Minogue album) =

2008 album by Kylie Minogue

Remix album by Kylie Minogue
- Released: 17 December 2008
- Recorded: 2000–08
- Genre: Pop; dance pop; electronic
- Length: 64:34
- Label: Parlophone

Kylie Minogue chronology
X (2007)	Boombox (2008)	Kylie Live in New York (2009)

Boombox (subtitled The Remix Album 2000–2008) is a remix album by Australian pop singer Kylie Minogue. It was released by Parlophone on 17 December 2008. The album contains remixes produced between 2000 and 2008, including a remix of the previously unreleased title track, "Boombox".

== Background ==
Most of the remixes featured on the compilation are edited down from their original length to be able to fit on the physical disc. The album's liner notes include referencing to where each remix was sourced and the catalogue number of their original release; The One (Bitrocka Mix) and Boombox (LA Riots Remix) being the exception as they are previously unreleased. Many of the remixes are sourced from rare promotional vinyl. "Kids", "Please Stay" and "Chocolate" are the only singles released by Parlophone between 2000 and 2009 that do not appear on the album in a remixed form; although "Kids" never received any remixes commissioned at the time of release.

On 11 December 2008, it was announced that the album would be released in the United States, to coincide with her nomination for the Grammy Awards of 2009.

Professional ratings
Review scores
Source	Rating
AllMusic	2/5 stars
NME	(5/10)
Pitchfork Media	(4.5/10)
The Times	2/5 stars
Virgin Media	2.5/5 stars

== Track listing ==
No.	Title	Length
1.	"Can't Get Blue Monday Out of My Head"	4:05
2.	"Spinning Around" (7th District club mix)	4:09
3.	"Wow" (Death Metal Disco Scene mix)	4:01
4.	"Love at First Sight" (Kid Crème vocal dub)	3:41
5.	"Slow" (Chemical Brothers remix)	4:45
6.	"Come into My World" (Fischerspooner mix)	4:18
7.	"Red Blooded Woman" (Whitey mix)	3:36
8.	"I Believe in You" (Mylo vocal mix)	3:24
9.	"In Your Eyes" (Knuckleheadz mix)	3:48
10.	"2 Hearts" (Mark Brown's Pacha Ibiza Upper Terrace mix)	4:20
11.	"On a Night Like This" (Bini & Martini club mix)	4:04
12.	"Giving You Up" (Riton re-rub vox)	4:13
13.	"In My Arms" (Sébastien Léger vocal remix)	3:49
14.	"The One" (Bitrocka remix)	4:43
15.	"Your Disco Needs You" (Casino radio & club mix)	3:40
16.	"Boombox" (LA Riots remix)	3:58
Total length:		64:34

Japanese edition bonus tracks
No.	Title	Length
17.	"All I See" (featuring Mims)	3:49
18.	"Wow" (CSS remix)	3:13
19.	"Can't Get You Out of My Head" (Greg Kurstin mix)	4:06

Digital edition bonus tracks
No.	Title	Length
17.	"Can't Get You Out of My Head" (Greg Kurstin mix)	4:06
18.	"Butterfly" (Mark Picchiotti Sandstorm dub)	9:03

Digital edition bonus disc
No.	Title	Length
1.	"Can't Get You Out of My Head"	3:51
2.	"Spinning Around"	3:27
3.	"Wow"	3:12
4.	"Love at First Sight"	3:57
5.	"Slow"	3:14
6.	"Come into My World"	4:05
7.	"Red Blooded Woman"	4:19
8.	"I Believe in You"	3:19
9.	"In Your Eyes"	3:18
10.	"2 Hearts"	2:53
11.	"On a Night Like This"	3:32
12.	"Giving You Up"	3:30
13.	"In My Arms"	3:31
14.	"The One"	4:04
15.	"Your Disco Needs You"	3:32

== Charts ==
Chart (2008)	Peak position
Japanese Oricon Albums Chart	146
Chart (2009)	Peak position
Australian Albums Chart	72
Czech Albums Chart	43
Greek Albums Chart	31
Greek International Albums Chart	9
Japanese Oricon Albums Chart	13
Scottish Albums (OCC)	43
UK Albums (OCC)	28
US Billboard Electronic Album Chart	10

== Release history ==
- Japan: 17 December 2008
- Europe: 2 January 2009
- UK, Mexico: 5 January 2009
- Sweden 7 January 2009
- Taiwan: 9 January 2009
- Canada: 13 January 2009
- U.S.: 27 January 2009
- Italy: 6 February 2009
- Australia, Colombia: 28 February 2009
- Argentina: 3 March 2009
