= List of number-one singles of 1980 (Canada) =

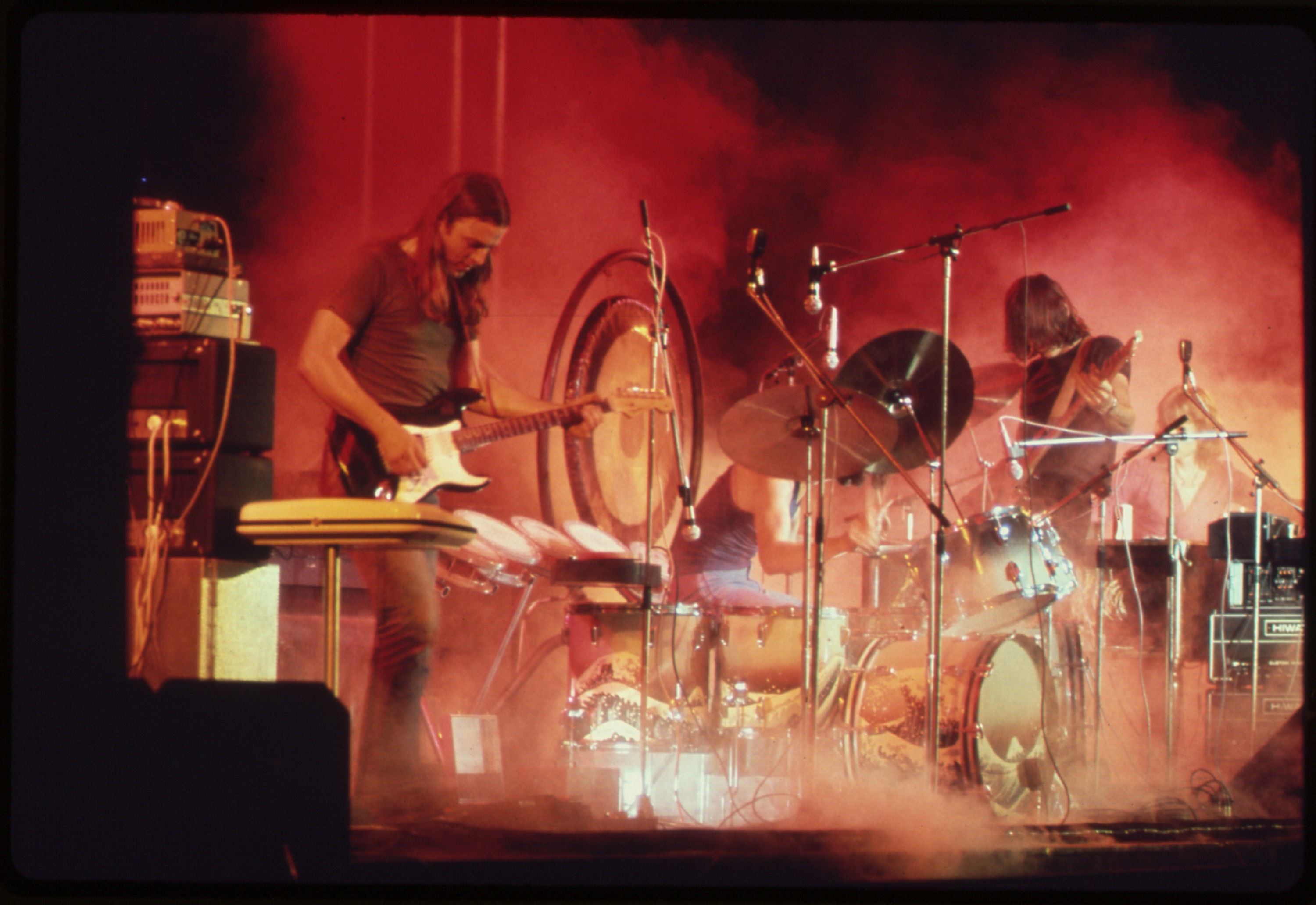
Pink Floyd's hit "Another Brick in the Wall (Part 2)" spent the most weeks at number one in 1980 and went on to become the year's highest-selling record.

RPM was a Canadian magazine that published the best-performing singles of Canada from 1964 to 2000. During 1980, twenty-two singles reached number one. American rock band Styx achieved the first number-one single of the year, "Babe", while Beatle John Lennon became the last musician to peak at the summit during the year with "(Just Like) Starting Over". Nine of the twenty-one chart-topping acts peaked atop the listing for the first time this year: Rupert Holmes, The Sugarhill Gang, Pink Floyd, The B-52's, Gary Numan, Lipps Inc., Billy Joel, Genesis, and Christopher Cross. No Canadian musicians reached number one in 1980.

The longest-running number-one single of the year, as well as the best-performing single of year, was Pink Floyd's "Another Brick in the Wall (Part 2)", which spent six issues at number one from 22 March to 26 April. "Call Me" by Blondie also remained atop the listing for six weeks, and Queen stayed a total of six weeks at the top with "Crazy Little Thing Called Love" and "Another One Bites the Dust". The Rolling Stones achieved a five-week stint at number one with "Emotional Rescue", and the two musical acts that remained at number one for three weeks were Kenny Rogers and Billy Joel.

Key
† Indicates best-performing single of 1980

== Chart history ==
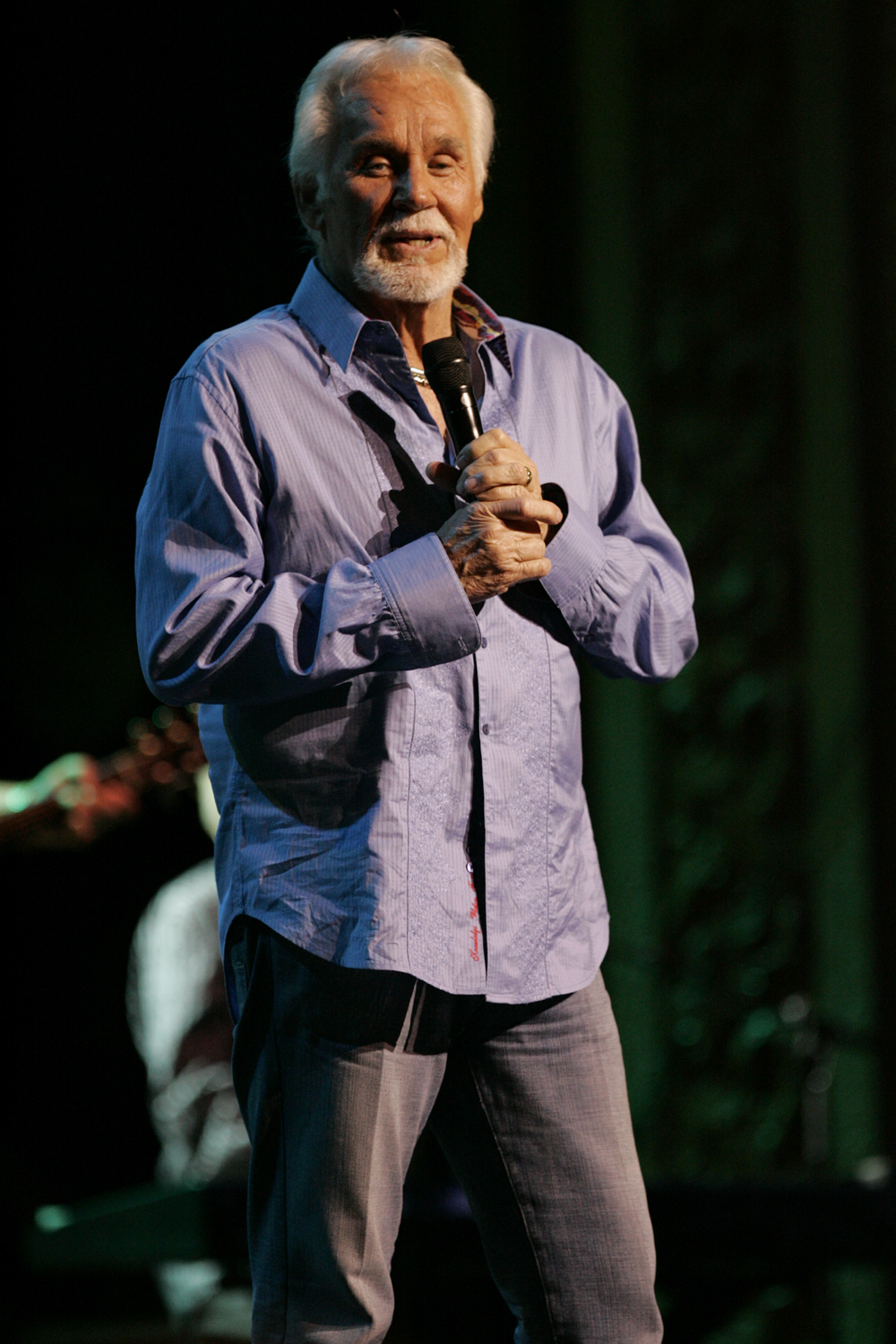
Kenny Rogers topped the chart for three nonconsecutive weeks with "Coward of the County".

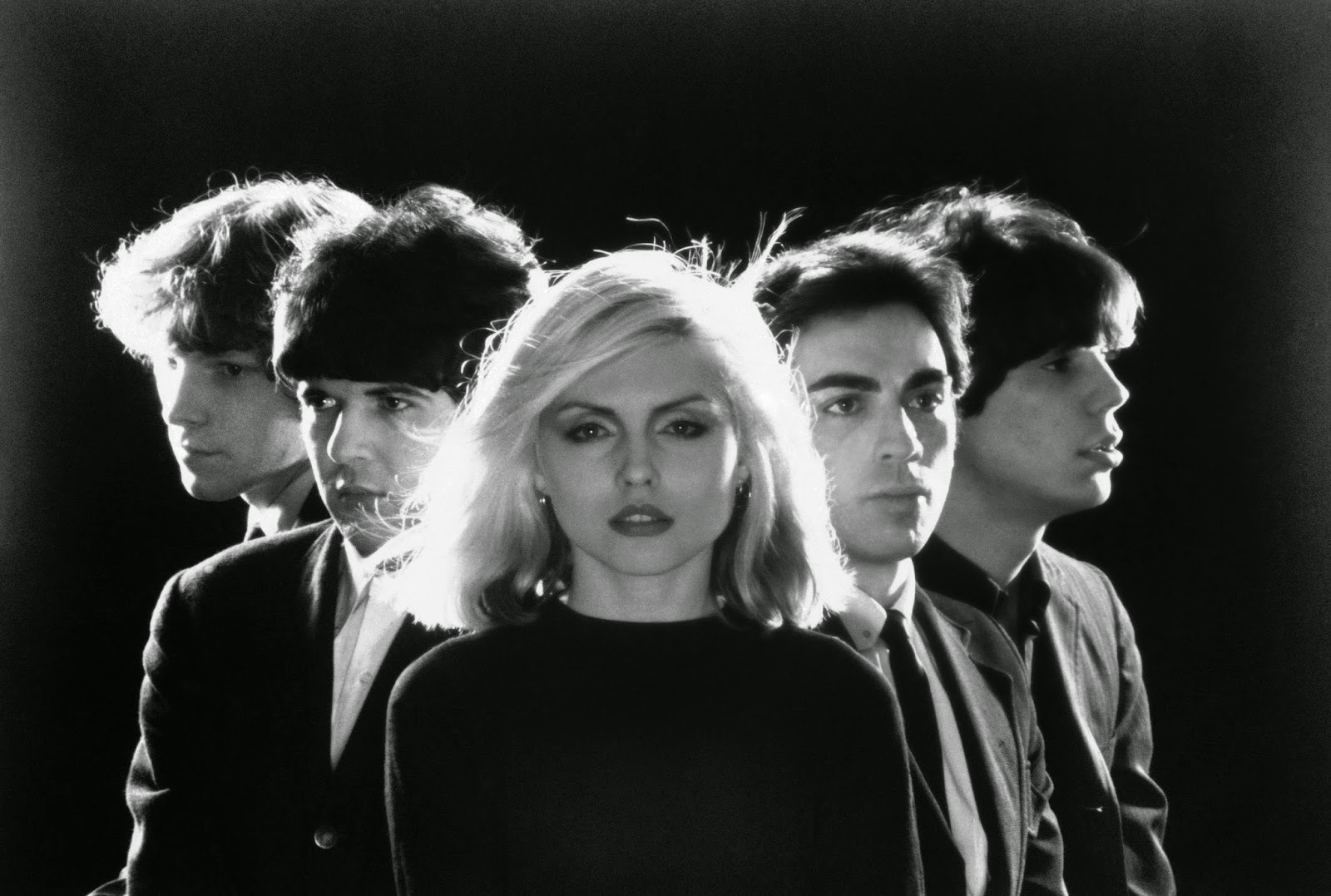
Blondie's song "Call Me" spent six weeks at number one in May and June.

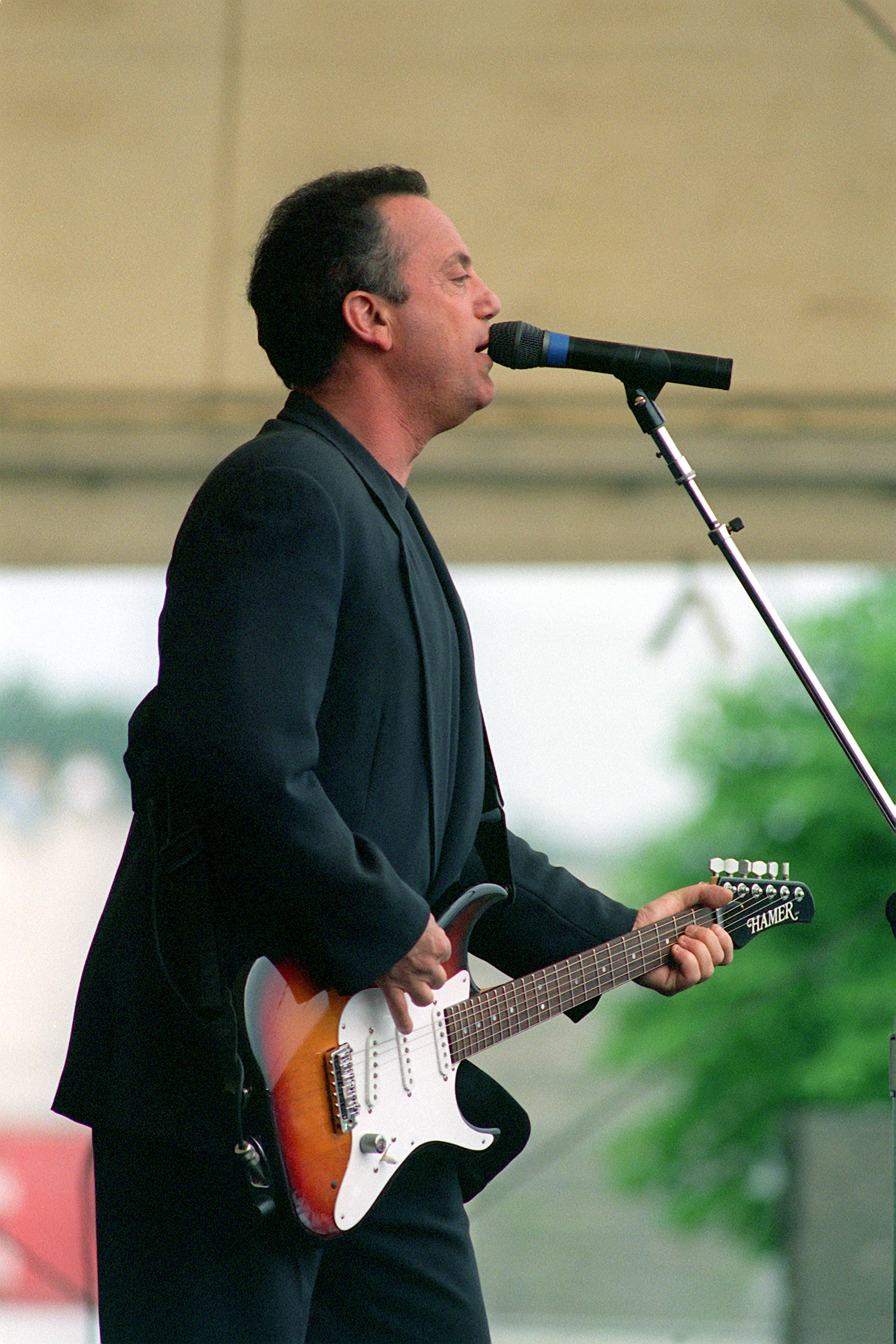
Billy Joel held the number-one position for three weeks with his song "It's Still Rock and Roll to Me".

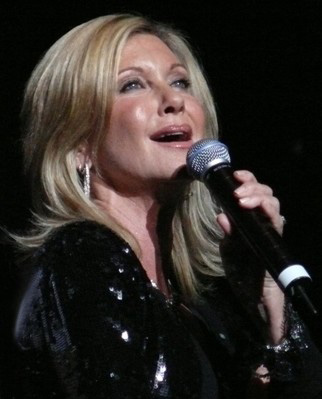
"Magic" by Olivia Newton-John ascended to number one for two weeks in September and October.

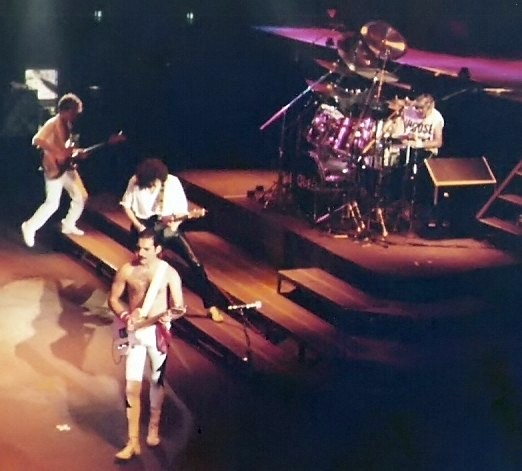
Two records by Queen reached number one on the RPM chart during 1980: "Crazy Little Thing Called Love" and "Another One Bites the Dust".

Issue date	Song	Artist	Reference
5 January (Note: Due to a week's break in publication over the 1979/1980 New Year period, the week of 5 January is inferred.)	"Babe"	Styx	
12 January	"Escape"	Rupert Holmes	
19 January	"Escape"	Rupert Holmes	
26 January	"Rapper's Delight"	The Sugarhill Gang	
2 February	"Rapper's Delight"	The Sugarhill Gang	
9 February	"Coward of the County"	Kenny Rogers	
16 February	"Please Don't Go"	KC and the Sunshine Band	
23 February	"Crazy Little Thing Called Love"	Queen	
1 March	"Crazy Little Thing Called Love"	Queen	
8 March	"Coward of the County"	Kenny Rogers	
15 March	"Coward of the County"	Kenny Rogers	
22 March	"Another Brick in the Wall (Part 2)"†	Pink Floyd	
29 March	"Another Brick in the Wall (Part 2)"†	Pink Floyd	
5 April	"Another Brick in the Wall (Part 2)"†	Pink Floyd	
12 April	"Another Brick in the Wall (Part 2)"†	Pink Floyd	
19 April	"Another Brick in the Wall (Part 2)"†	Pink Floyd	
26 April	"Another Brick in the Wall (Part 2)"†	Pink Floyd	
3 May	"Call Me"	Blondie	
10 May	"Call Me"	Blondie	
17 May	"Call Me"	Blondie	
24 May	"Rock Lobster"	The B-52's	
31 May	"Call Me"	Blondie	
7 June	"Call Me"	Blondie	
14 June	"Call Me"	Blondie	
21 June	"Cars"	Gary Numan	
28 June	"Cars"	Gary Numan	
5 July	"Coming Up"	Paul McCartney	
12 July	"Funkytown"	Lipps Inc.	
19 July	"Little Jeannie"	Elton John	
26 July	"It's Still Rock and Roll to Me"	Billy Joel	
2 August	"It's Still Rock and Roll to Me"	Billy Joel	
9 August	"It's Still Rock and Roll to Me"	Billy Joel	
16 August	"Misunderstanding"	Genesis	
23 August	"Emotional Rescue"	the Rolling Stones	
30 August	"Emotional Rescue"	the Rolling Stones	
6 September	"Emotional Rescue"	the Rolling Stones	
13 September	"Emotional Rescue"	the Rolling Stones	
20 September (Note: For the rest of the year, charts were published every two weeks.)	"Emotional Rescue"	the Rolling Stones	
27 September	"Magic"	Olivia Newton-John	
4 October	"Magic"	Olivia Newton-John	
11 October	"Sailing"	Christopher Cross	
18 October	"Sailing"	Christopher Cross	
25 October	"Another One Bites the Dust"	Queen	
1 November	"Another One Bites the Dust"	Queen	
8 November	"Another One Bites the Dust"	Queen	
15 November	"Another One Bites the Dust"	Queen	
22 November	"Woman in Love"	Barbra Streisand	
29 November	"Woman in Love"	Barbra Streisand	
6 December	"Dreamer"	Supertramp	
13 December	"Dreamer"	Supertramp	
20 December	"(Just Like) Starting Over"	John Lennon	
27 December	"(Just Like) Starting Over"	John Lennon	

== See also ==
- 1980 in music
- List of RPM number-one adult contemporary singles of 1980
- List of RPM number-one country singles of 1980
- List of Billboard Hot 100 number ones of 1980
- List of Cashbox Top 100 number-one singles of 1980
- List of Canadian number-one albums of 1980
