= Pucker Up =

Studio album by Lipps Inc.
- Released: 1980
- Studio: Sound 80 Studios, Minneapolis, Minnesota
- Genre: Disco
- Length: 30:11
- Label: Casablanca NBLP 7242
- Producer: Steven Greenberg

Lipps Inc. chronology
| Mouth to Mouth (1979) | Pucker Up (1980) | Designer Music (1981) |

Singles from Bad to the Bone
- 1. "How Long" Released: 1980

Pucker Up is the second studio album by American disco act Lipps Inc. The album was released in 1980 on Casablanca Records. The album contains the minor hit "How Long", a cover of the 1974 hit by Ace, reaching number 4 on the U.S. dance chart and number 29 on the U.S. soul singles chart. It was not as successful as the group's previous album.

== Critical reception ==
Professional ratings
Review scores
| Source | Rating |
|---|---|
| AllMusic | link |

Pucker Up received mixed reviews from critics. AllMusic's Amy Hanson said "Unfortunately, that one song (How Long) is the album, and the rest just pales in its wake. And, if the truth were to be told, the album itself pales in the wake of "Funkytown". Sometimes it's better to be remembered as a one-hit wonder."

== Track listing ==
All songs written by Steven Greenberg, except where noted.

Side one
| No. | Title | Lyrics | Length |
|---|---|---|---|
| 1. | "How Long" | P. Carrack | 5:50 |
| 2. | "Tight Pair" | | 8:33 |

Side two
| No. | Title | Lyrics | Length |
|---|---|---|---|
| 1. | "Always Lookin'" | | 4:36 |
| 2. | "The Gossip Song" | | 3:50 |
| 3. | "There They Are" | S. Greenberg, S. Jones | 3:25 |
| 4. | "Jazzy" (Instrumental) | | 3:57 |
| Total length: | | | 30:11 |

== Charts ==
Album

| Chart (1980) | Position |
|---|---|
| Norwegian Albums (VG-lista) | 40 |
| Swedish Albums (Sverigetopplistan) | 46 |

Singles

| Year | Song | Chart | Position |
|---|---|---|---|
| 1981 | "How Long" | U.S. Dance Chart | 4 |
| 1981 | "How Long" | U.S. Soul Singles Chart | 29 |

== Sales and certifications ==
| Region | Certification | Certified units/sales |
|---|---|---|
| Hong Kong (IFPI Hong Kong) | Gold | 10,000^{*} |
^{*} Sales figures based on certification alone.

== Personnel ==
The following personnel are credited on the album:

Musicians

- Cynthia Johnson - lead vocals
- Steven Greenberg - drums (1–6), bass (1–6), synthesizers (1–3), piano (1–5), percussion (3–6), organ (4), background vocals (2, 3)
- David Rivkin - guitar (1)
- Roger Dumas - synthesizers (1), programming (1, 2, 6)

Technical

- Steven Greenberg - producer
- Steven Productions - executive productions
- Chris Bellman - mastering
- David Rivkin - recording
- Phyllis Chotin - art direction
- Art Hotel - design
- Sketch Bruckner - Illustration
