= Steven Greenberg (musician) =

American musician (born 1950)

Steven Phillip Greenberg (born October 24, 1950) is an American musician, record producer and the owner of the independent label October Records. He is best known for his band Lipps Inc.'s 1980 hit song "Funkytown" (which was also a 1986 hit for Australian band Pseudo Echo).

== Career ==
Greenberg was born in Saint Paul, Minnesota, United States. In his twenties, Greenberg was a multi-instrumentalist who played in several bands. He had been trying for some time to secure a production deal, and he drew the interest of the Casablanca label with a disco track called "Rock It", which became a hit locally. Released nationally in late 1979, "Rock It" made it into the Top 20 on the Billboard Disco Charts. Casablanca asked Greenberg for a full album, so he gathered several session players, among them guitarists David Rivkin and Tom Riopelle; keyboardist Ivan Rafowitz; synth and vocoder programmer Roger Dumas (not to be confused with French actor Roger Dumas); and bassist Terry Grant. Most importantly, he recruited lead vocalist Cynthia Johnson, the 1976 Miss Black Minnesota, who had been performing with an early version of The Time.

The group's debut album, Mouth To Mouth, was released in November 1979. "Funkytown" was the first single, and it was an instant hit, climbing to No. 1 on May 31, 1980, and spending four weeks there. In the wake of that success, "Rock It" was re-released but it only made the Billboard Top 50. The six-song release Pucker Up followed, featuring a disco remake of the British pub rock group Ace's hit ballad "How Long". It earned gold and platinum records in many countries. Lipps Inc.'s full-length Designer Music was a huge success in Mexico and in Central and South America, and it made Top 10 on the Billboard Disco chart. Designer Music also earned gold and platinum elsewhere, including Mexico and Hong Kong, but no subsequent song matched the success of "Funkytown" in the United States.

Cynthia Johnson was already decreasing her involvement with the group, with Melanie Rosales and Margie Cox picking up some of the slack and later becoming lead vocalists. Johnson left for good in 1983, after three albums. Lipps Inc. released one more album before breaking up in 1985. Greenberg became a web designer in 1992 and stayed in that field through 2007.

== Personal life ==
In 2005, his son Nile was featured on the MTV show Made, in which he wanted to become a rapper using the stage name Blizzard. Later, Nile became an architect.

Greenberg mentored his nephew John Fields, a producer/songwriter.

== See also ==
- Music of Minnesota
