= List of RPM number-one adult contemporary singles of 1980 =

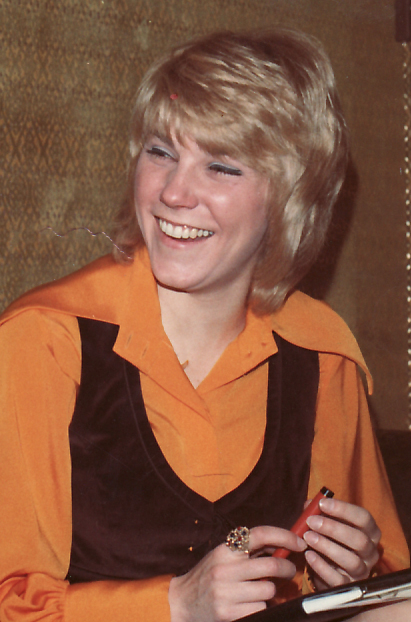
Canadian country singer Anne Murray had four chart-topping singles in the RPM adult contemporary charts of 1980

From January 12 to November 22, 1980, RPM magazine published a chart for top-performing singles in the adult contemporary or easy listening categories in Canada. The chart, entitled Adult Oriented Playlist in 1980, has undergone numerous name changes and has become Adult Contemporary (or Contemporary Adult) from June 1981 to September 1988, and May 1989 until the magazine's final publication in November 2000. In 1980, thirty-two individual songs topped the chart, which contained 50 positions. By late 1980, the chart was only published every two weeks, and went into hiatus in November 29, restarting publication then simply as Adult Oriented in June 1981, and becoming Contemporary Adult and Adult Contemporary for the rest of the magazine's existence.

== Chart history ==
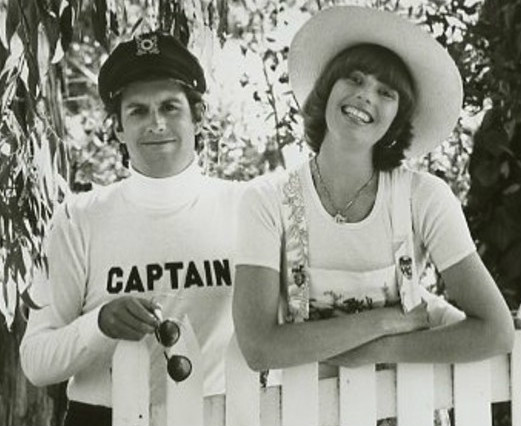
American pop duo Captain & Tennille topped the chart with the single "Do That to Me One More Time"

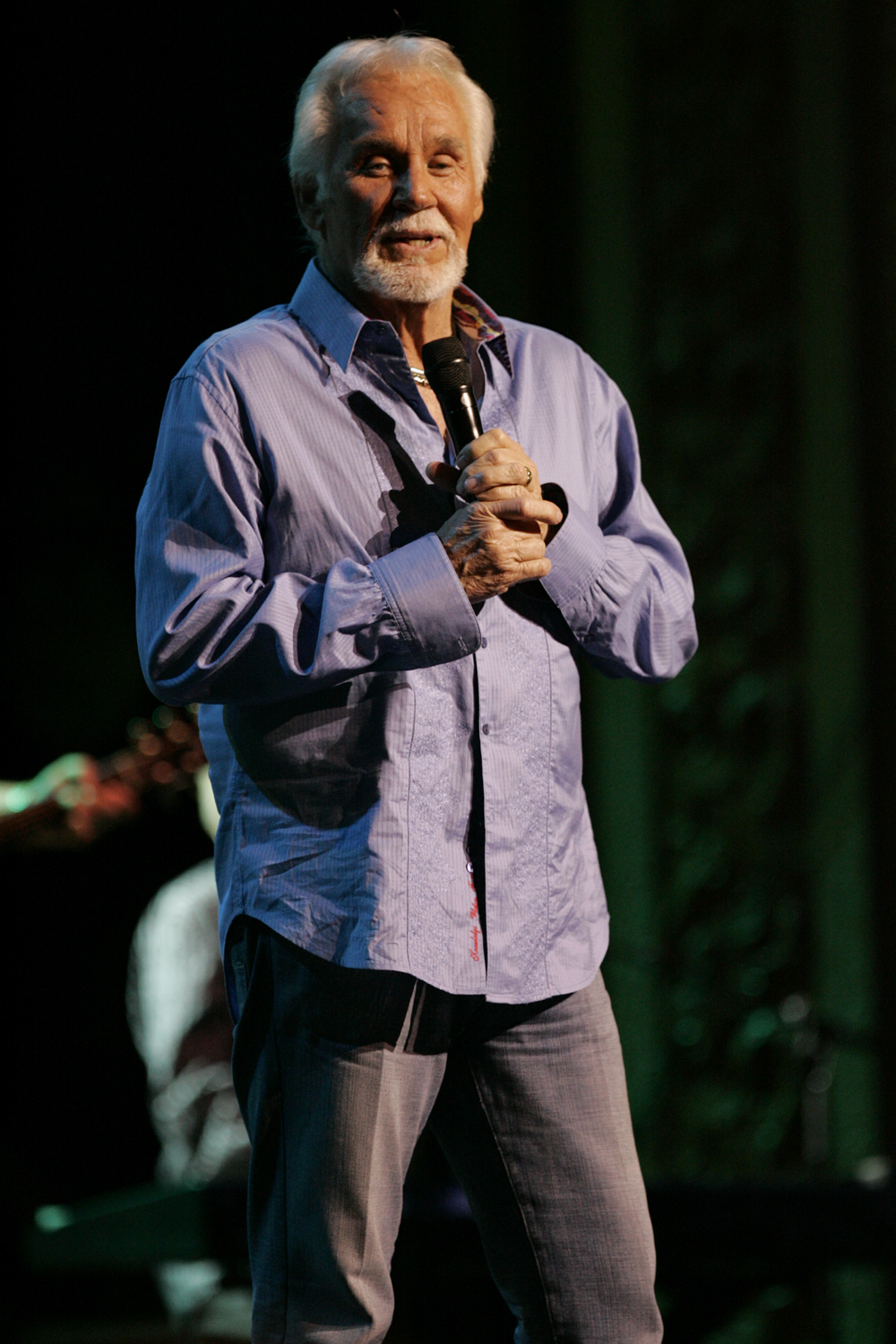
Kenny Rogers topped the charts with "Coward of the County" and the duet "Don't Fall in Love with a Dreamer" (with Kim Carnes).

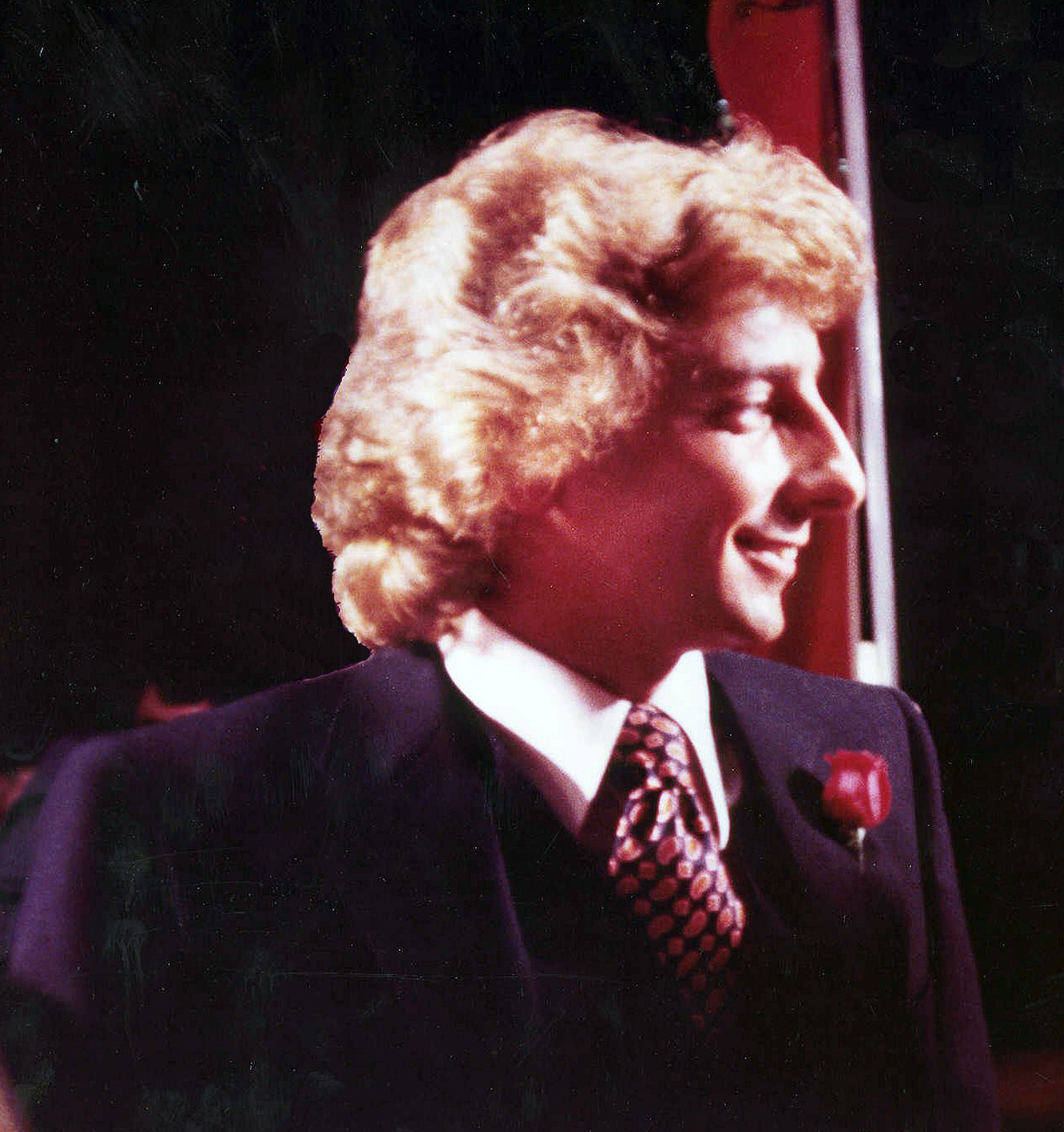
Barry Manilow had two chart-topping singles in the chart, with "When I Wanted You" and "I Don't Want to Walk without You"

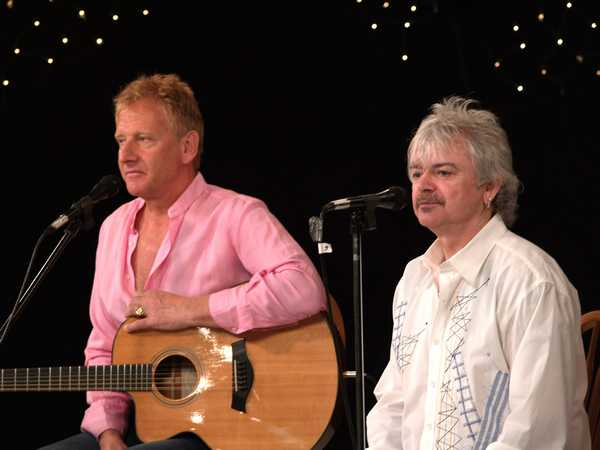
British-Australian soft rock duo Air Supply had their first number-one in the Canadian AC chart with "Lost in Love", which spent two weeks at number one

An asterisk (*) indicates an unpublished weekly chart, either due to the special double issues RPM publishes for the year-end top singles charts or the chart being published only every two weeks (as from September 27 until the chart's hiatus).

Chart history
Issue date	Title	Artist(s)	Ref.
January 5*	"Babe"	Styx	
January 12	"Baby and the Blues"	Quarrington Worthy	
January 19	"Coward of the County"	Kenny Rogers	
January 26	"Do That to Me One More Time"	Captain & Tennille	
February 2	"Volcano"	Jimmy Buffett	
February 9	"September Morn"	Neil Diamond	
February 16	"September Morn"	Neil Diamond	
February 23	"I'd Rather Leave When I'm in Love"	Rita Coolidge	
March 1	"Kiss Me in the Rain"	Barbra Streisand	
March 8	"Years"	Barbara Mandrell	
March 15	"Years"	Barbara Mandrell	
March 22	"Daydream Believer"	Anne Murray	
March 29	"Daydream Believer"	Anne Murray	
April 5	"You Are My Miracle"	Roger Whittaker	
April 12	"When I Wanted You"	Barry Manilow	
April 19	"On the Radio"	Donna Summer	
April 26	"Sexy Eyes"	Dr. Hook	
May 3	"Lost in Love"	Air Supply	
May 10	"Lost in Love"	Air Supply	
May 17	"Ride Like the Wind"	Christopher Cross	
May 24	"I Have a Dream"	ABBA	
May 31	"Lucky Me"	Anne Murray	
June 7	"Gee Whiz"	Bernadette Peters	
June 14	"Dream Street Rose"	Gordon Lightfoot	
June 21	"Don't Fall in Love with a Dreamer"	Kenny Rogers & Kim Carnes	
June 28	"The Rose"	Bette Midler	
July 5	"I Don't Want to Walk without You"	Barry Manilow	
July 12	"I Don't Want to Walk without You"	Barry Manilow	
July 19	"Magic"	Olivia Newton-John	
July 26	"I Don't Want to Walk without You"	Barry Manilow	
August 2	"Cupid"/"I've Loved You for a Long Time"	The Spinners	
August 9	"Let Me Love You Tonight"	Pure Prairie League	
August 16	"I'm Happy Just to Dance with You"	Anne Murray	
August 23	"I'm Happy Just to Dance with You"	Anne Murray	
August 30	"Sailing"	Christopher Cross	
September 6	"Magic"	Olivia Newton-John	
September 13	"Don't Ask Me Why"	Billy Joel	
September 20	"Don't Ask Me Why"	Billy Joel	
September 27	"Upside Down"	Diana Ross	
October 4*	"Upside Down"	Diana Ross	
October 11	"Upside Down"	Diana Ross	
October 18*	"Upside Down"	Diana Ross	
October 25	"Woman in Love"	Barbra Streisand	
November 1*	"Woman in Love"	Barbra Streisand	
November 8	"Woman in Love"	Barbra Streisand	
November 15*	"Woman in Love"	Barbra Streisand	
November 22	"Could I Have This Dance"	Anne Murray	
