= List of number-one singles of 1980 (France) =

This is a list of the French Singles & Airplay Chart Reviews number-ones of 1980.

== Summary ==
=== Singles chart ===
Week	Date	Artist	Single
1	4 January	The Buggles	"Video Killed the Radio Star"
2	11 January	The Buggles	"Video Killed the Radio Star"
3	18 January	The Buggles	"Video Killed the Radio Star"
4	25 January	The Buggles	"Video Killed the Radio Star"
5	1 February	The Buggles	"Video Killed the Radio Star"
6	8 February	Pink Floyd	"Another Brick in the Wall (Part II)"
7	15 February	Pink Floyd	"Another Brick in the Wall (Part II)"
8	22 February	Pink Floyd	"Another Brick in the Wall (Part II)"
9	29 February	Pink Floyd	"Another Brick in the Wall (Part II)"
10	7 March	Pink Floyd	"Another Brick in the Wall (Part II)"
11	14 March	Madness	"One Step Beyond"
12	21 March	Madness	"One Step Beyond"
13	28 March	Jeane Manson	"Vis Ta Vie"
14	4 April	Madness	"One Step Beyond"
15	11 April	Le Grand Orchestre Du Splendid	"Macao"
16	18 April	Le Grand Orchestre Du Splendid	"Macao"
17	25 April	Lio	"Le Banana Split"
18	2 May	Lio	"Le Banana Split"
19	9 May	Lio	"Le Banana Split"
20	16 May	Madness	"One Step Beyond"
21	23 May	Madness	"One Step Beyond"
22	30 May	Madness	"One Step Beyond"
23	6 June	Madness	"One Step Beyond"
24	13 June	Madness	"One Step Beyond"
25	20 June	France Gall	"Il jouait du piano debout"
26	27 June	France Gall	"Il jouait du piano debout"
27	4 July	France Gall	"Il jouait du piano debout"
28	11 July	France Gall	"Il jouait du piano debout"
29	18 July	France Gall	"Il jouait du piano debout"
30	25 July	France Gall	"Il jouait du piano debout"
31	1 August	France Gall	"Il jouait du piano debout"
32	1 August	France Gall	"Il jouait du piano debout"
33	8 August	France Gall	"Il jouait du piano debout"
34	15 August	Lipps Inc.	"Funkytown"
35	22 August	Lipps Inc.	"Funkytown"
36	29 August	The Korgis	"Everybody's Got to Learn Sometime"
36	5 September	The Korgis	"Everybody's Got to Learn Sometime"
37	12 September	The Korgis	"Everybody's Got to Learn Sometime"
38	19 September	The Korgis	"Everybody's Got to Learn Sometime"
39	26 September	The Korgis	"Everybody's Got to Learn Sometime"
40	3 October	The Korgis	"Everybody's Got to Learn Sometime"
41	10 October	France Gall	"Il jouait du piano debout"
42	17 October	Lio	"Amoureux solitaires"
43	24 October	Lio	"Amoureux solitaires"
44	31 October	Lio	"Amoureux solitaires"
45	7 November	Lio	"Amoureux solitaires"
46	14 November	Lio	"Amoureux solitaires"
47	21 November	Lio	"Amoureux solitaires"
48	28 November	Barbra Streisand	"Woman in Love"
49	5 December	Barbra Streisand	"Woman in Love"
50	12 December	Barbra Streisand	"Woman in Love"
51	19 December	Barbra Streisand	"Woman in Love"
52	26 December	Barbra Streisand	"Woman in Love"

== See also ==
- 1980 in music
- List of number-one hits (France)
