= List of European number-one hits of 1980 =

This is a list of the Hitkrant Europarade number-one singles of 1980.

Date	Song	Artist
2 January	"Video Killed the Radio Star"	Buggles
9 January	"Video Killed the Radio Star"	Buggles
16 January	"I Have a Dream"	ABBA
23 January	"I Have a Dream"	ABBA
30 January	"I Have a Dream"	ABBA
7 February	"Another Brick in the Wall (Part II)"	Pink Floyd
14 February	"Another Brick in the Wall (Part II)"	Pink Floyd
21 February	"Another Brick in the Wall (Part II)"	Pink Floyd
28 February	"Another Brick in the Wall (Part II)"	Pink Floyd
6 March	"Another Brick in the Wall (Part II)"	Pink Floyd
13 March	"Another Brick in the Wall (Part II)"	Pink Floyd
20 March	"Another Brick in the Wall (Part II)"	Pink Floyd
27 March	"Another Brick in the Wall (Part II)"	Pink Floyd
3 April	"Another Brick in the Wall (Part II)"	Pink Floyd
10 April	"Another Brick in the Wall (Part II)"	Pink Floyd
17 April	"Another Brick in the Wall (Part II)"	Pink Floyd
24 April	"Sun of Jamaica"	Goombay Dance Band
1 May	"Sun of Jamaica"	Goombay Dance Band
8 May	"Sun of Jamaica"	Goombay Dance Band
15 May	"What's Another Year"	Johnny Logan
22 May	"What's Another Year"	Johnny Logan
29 May	"What's Another Year"	Johnny Logan
5 June	"What's Another Year"	Johnny Logan
12 June	"What's Another Year"	Johnny Logan
19 June	"Funkytown"	Lipps, Inc.
26 June	"Funkytown"	Lipps, Inc.
3 July	"Funkytown"	Lipps, Inc.
10 July	"Funkytown"	Lipps, Inc.
17 July	"Funkytown"	Lipps, Inc.
24 July	"Funkytown"	Lipps, Inc.
31 July	"Funkytown"	Lipps, Inc.
7 August	"Xanadu"	Olivia Newton-John & Electric Light Orchestra
14 August	"Xanadu"	Olivia Newton-John & Electric Light Orchestra
21 August	"Xanadu"	Olivia Newton-John & Electric Light Orchestra
28 August	"The Winner Takes It All"	ABBA
4 September	"The Winner Takes It All"	ABBA
11 September	"The Winner Takes It All"	ABBA
18 September	"The Winner Takes It All"	ABBA
25 September	"The Winner Takes It All"	ABBA
2 October	"The Winner Takes It All"	ABBA
9 October	"The Winner Takes It All"	ABBA
16 October	"Upside Down"	Diana Ross
23 October	"Upside Down"	Diana Ross
30 October	"Upside Down"	Diana Ross
6 November	"Upside Down"	Diana Ross
13 November	"Woman In Love"	Barbra Streisand
20 November	"Woman In Love"	Barbra Streisand
27 November	"Woman In Love"	Barbra Streisand
4 December	"Woman In Love"	Barbra Streisand
11 December	"Woman In Love"	Barbra Streisand
18 December	"Super Trouper"	ABBA
25 December	"Super Trouper"	ABBA
