= Cynthia Johnson =

American singer-songwriter (born 1956)

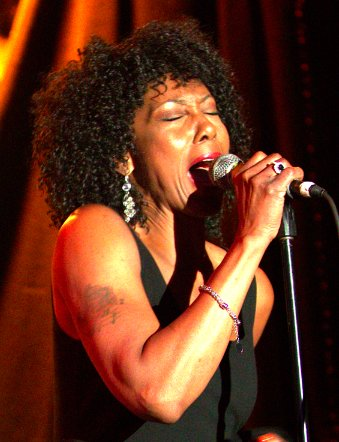
- Johnson performing in July 2013

Background information
- Born: April 22, 1956 (age 70); Saint Paul, Minnesota, U.S.
- Genres: Funk; disco; R&B; jazz; pop; soul; rock
- Occupations: Singer; songwriter; television personality
- Instruments: Vocals; saxophone
- Years active: 1973–present
- Labels: Casablanca; Megabien Music
- Formerly of: Lipps Inc., Flyte Tyme, Sounds of Blackness
- Website: cynthiajohnson.net

Cynthia Johnson (born April 22, 1956) is an American singer, songwriter and television personality. She is best known as the lead vocalist of the disco and funk group Lipps Inc. with the worldwide smash hit "Funkytown".

== Musical career ==
=== Beginnings ===
Prior to becoming the lead singer of Lipps Inc., Johnson had become well-known locally for winning the 1976 Miss Black Minnesota, USA pageant, and for being the lead vocalist of the well-known Minneapolis band Flyte Tyme for seven years. Being also an accomplished saxophone player, Johnson utilized her saxophone talents in Flyte Tyme, and she also wrote many of their songs. Johnson also co-wrote some songs with band members Jimmy Jam and Terry Lewis, today a multi-Grammy Award-winning songwriting and producing team. Johnson completed her undergraduate degree at the University of Minnesota, Morris in 1978, and continued to perform with Flyte Tyme for a brief time. Shortly after she left Flyte Tyme, the band evolved into The Time, a side project of Prince.

=== Lipps Inc. ===
Johnson was the lead singer of the popular Minneapolis-based band Lipps Inc., best known for its 1980 song "Funkytown". The song hit No. 1 in 28 countries, sold more than 35 million copies worldwide, and earned a place in the "One-Hit Wonders" section of the Rock & Roll Museum in Cleveland, Ohio. Other singles include "Designer Music" and "Rock It", but the group never matched the success of "Funkytown", which continues to influence popular culture. The group received several awards, among them three Billboard Music Awards and "Soul Record of the Year" by the AMOA association. Johnson left the band after the group's third album Designer Music was released.

=== Late 1980s to present ===
Johnson has continued her musical career and remains active as a member of the three-time Grammy Award-winning gospel group Sounds of Blackness, as a musician on albums by Maceo Parker and Prince, on labels such as Motown, and on projects of Grammy-winning producers Jimmy Jam and Terry Lewis. She also has worked as a jingle singer on commercials for products from 3M, Volkswagen, Nissan, Target, FedEx, Ford and McDonald's. She has also sung for U.S. presidents. Johnson was the host of the first episode of the FunkyTown TV series, produced by the Minneapolis-based production company, Megabien Entertainment.

=== Solo career ===
In addition to working with others, Johnson continues her career as a solo artist. Her debut album, All That I Am, was released on December 15, 2013, on the Megabien Music label.

== Discography ==
=== Solo albums and lead vocalist ===
- 1979: Mouth to Mouth – Lipps, Inc. – Lead Vocals
- 1980: Pucker Up – Lipps, Inc. – Lead Vocals
- 1981: Designer Music – Lipps, Inc. – Lead Vocals, songwriter
- 1992: Funkyworld – Lipps, Inc. – Lead Vocals
- 2003: Funkytown – Lipps, Inc. – Lead Vocals, songwriter, composer
- 2013: All That I Am – Main Vocals, songwriter, producer

=== Additional appearances ===
- 1978: A Touch on the Rainy Side – Jesse Winchester – Choir/Chorus
- 1980: Billboard Top Dance Hits: 1980 – Saxophone, Vocals
- 1987: Kiss Serious – Chico DeBarge – backing vocals
- 1988: Just Like That – Brownmark – backing vocals
- 1988: Personal & Attention – Stacy Lattisaw – backing vocals
- 1988: When the Lights Go Out – Pia Zadora – backing vocals
- 1988: Carry On, Vol. 2 – Ipso Facto – Vocals
- 1988: Omaiyo – Robin Adnan Anders – Vocals
- 1990: I Am – Elisa Fiorillo – backing vocals
- 1990: The Brojos – The Brojos – Rap, backing vocals
- 1991: Here It Is – Jevetta Steele – backing vocals
- 1991: Imperial Bells of China – Hubei Song & Dance Ensemble – Photography
- 1994: African-American Music in Minnesota – Vocals
- 1995: It Must Be Christmas – Debbie Duncan – Choir/Chorus, Vocals
- 1996: Best of the Singer's Voice – Performer, Primary Artist
- 1996: Greatest Hits – Georgia Mass Choir – Choir/Chorus
- 1998: Lonnie Hunter & The Voices of St. Mark – Lonnie Hunter – Alto Vocals
- 1998: Lost in the Blues – Doug Maynard – backing vocals
- 1998: River of Song: A Musical Journey Down the Mississippi – Producer
- 1999: Loud Guitars, Big Suspicions – Shannon Curfman – backing vocals
- 1999: Billboard Top Dance Hits: 1976–1980 – Saxophone, Vocals
- 2002: Solid Gold Funk – Vocals
- 2002: Soul Symphony – Sounds of Blackness – Alto Vocals
- 2003: Angels on the Freeway – Kevin Bowe – Vocals
- 2003: Cross N Water – Ford – Vocals, backing vocals
- 2003: David Young – David Young – backing vocals
- 2003: Made by Maceo – Maceo Parker – backing vocals
- 2003: Sweet Talk – Reneé Austin – backing vocals
- 2004: Deliverance – Shane Henry – backing vocals
- 2005: In the Fellowship – Patrick Lundy – Tenor Vocals
- 2005: Right About Love – Reneé Austin – Vocal Harmony, backing vocals
- 2005: School's In! – Maceo Parker – Vocals, backing vocals
- 2005: Unity – Sounds of Blackness – Alto Vocals, Primary Artist, Vocals
- 2006: I'll Play All Night Long – John McAndrew – backing vocals
- 2006: Overflow – Kevin Davidson – Banjo
- 2007: Between Saturday Night and Sunday Morning – Mick Sterling – Main Personnel, Vocals, backing vocals
- 2007: Kings and Queens: Message from the Movement – Sounds of Blackness – Alto Vocals
- 2007: The One Who's Leavin' – Doug Spartz – backing vocals
- 2010: Chinese Whispers – Alison Scott – backing vocals
- 2010: Life's a Party: the Best of In Between – Primary Artist
- 2011: Hope One Mile – G.B. Leighton – Vocal Harmony
- 2011: Sounds of Blackness – Sounds of Blackness – Alto Vocals, Group Member, Vocals
- 2012: Natchez Trace – Kevin Bowe – Vocal Harmony
- 2012: "Nothing But a Breeze" / "A Touch on the Rainy Side" – Jesse Winchester –Choir/Chorus
- 2013: He's Faithful – James Pullin & Remnant – Soprano vocals
- 2013: Purple Snow, Forecasting the Minneapolis Sound – Lead Vocals, Songwriter (1970s recording on compilation)

== Filmography ==
- Live performance "Higher Ground" with ABC Youth Choir, Fitzgerald Theater in Saint Paul, Minnesota, 2001
- Funkytown, TV series, 2013
- Les Annees Bonheur, French TV show, 2014

== Awards and recognitions ==
- Miss Black Minnesota USA, 1976
- Induction into the Minnesota Music Hall of Fame as a member of Lipps Inc
- Recipient of Platinum in the US, Double Platinum in Canada, Gold in France and Germany, Silver in the UK, among others, as the lead singer on "Funkytown"
- Three Billboard Music Awards, 1980
- Three-time Grammy Award Winner as a member of Sounds of Blackness, 1991, 1993 and 1998
