= Rock It (Lipps Inc. song) =

1979 single by Lipps Inc.

Single by Lipps Inc.

from the album Mouth to Mouth
- B-side: "Power" (7")
- Released: 1979
- Genre: Disco
- Length: 3:23 (7"); 5:40 (album version)
- Label: Casablanca
- Songwriter(s): Steven Greenberg
- Producer(s): Steven Greenberg

Lipps Inc. singles chronology
"Rock It" (1979)	"Funkytown" (1980)

Audio
- "Rock It" on YouTube

"Rock It" is the debut single by Minneapolis band Lipps Inc. and the lead single from their debut album Mouth to Mouth. The song peaked at No. 64 on the Billboard Hot 100 in August 1980 following a second launch.

== Background ==
"Rock It" had become a hit in band leader Steven Greenberg's home state of Minnesota and caught the attention of Casablanca Records. It led to the band being signed by the label and the release of the band's debut album in November.

The song failed to cross over from the Disco charts upon its initial August, 1979 release. Following the worldwide success of "Funkytown", the single was re-released in June, 1980. This time, it reached No. 64 on the Hot 100 singles chart in the US.

Cash Box said that "Cynthia Johnson's sleek vocal swoops are nicely backed by arching strings and smart funk bass."

== Sales ==
Sales for "Rock It"
Region	Certification	Certified units/sales
Mexico	—	1,000,000
