= List of number-one hits of 1980 (Germany) =

This is a list of the German Media Control Top100 Singles Chart number-ones of 1980.

Key
| † | Indicates best-performing single and album of 1980 |

| Issue date | Song | Artist | Album | Artist |
|---|---|---|---|---|
| 7 January | "Maybe" | Thom Pace | "Weihnachten mit Andrea Jürgens" | Andrea Jürgens |
| 14 January | "Maybe" | Thom Pace | "Weihnachten mit Andrea Jürgens" | Andrea Jürgens |
| 21 January | "Sun of Jamaica" † | Goombay Dance Band | "The Wall" † | Pink Floyd |
| 28 January | "Sun of Jamaica" † | Goombay Dance Band | "The Wall" † | Pink Floyd |
| 4 February | "Another Brick in the Wall Part II" | Pink Floyd | "The Wall" † | Pink Floyd |
| 11 February | "Another Brick in the Wall Part II" | Pink Floyd | "The Wall" † | Pink Floyd |
| 18 February | "Another Brick in the Wall Part II" | Pink Floyd | "The Wall" † | Pink Floyd |
| 25 February | "Sun of Jamaica" † | Goombay Dance Band | "The Wall" † | Pink Floyd |
| 3 March | "Another Brick in the Wall Part II" | Pink Floyd | "The Wall" † | Pink Floyd |
| 10 March | "Sun of Jamaica" † | Goombay Dance Band | "The Wall" † | Pink Floyd |
| 17 March | "Sun of Jamaica" † | Goombay Dance Band | "The Wall" † | Pink Floyd |
| 24 March | "Sun of Jamaica" † | Goombay Dance Band | "The Wall" † | Pink Floyd |
| 31 March | "Sun of Jamaica" † | Goombay Dance Band | "The Wall" † | Pink Floyd |
| 7 April | "Sun of Jamaica" † | Goombay Dance Band | "The Wall" † | Pink Floyd |
| 14 April | "It's a Real Good Feeling" | Peter Kent (singer) | "The Wall" † | Pink Floyd |
| 21 April | "Sun of Jamaica" † | Goombay Dance Band | "The Wall" † | Pink Floyd |
| 28 April | "Weekend" | Earth & Fire | "The Wall" † | Pink Floyd |
| 5 May | "Weekend" | Earth & Fire | "The Wall" † | Pink Floyd |
| 12 May | "Weekend" | Earth & Fire | "The Wall" † | Pink Floyd |
| 19 May | "Weekend" | Earth & Fire | "Die schonsten Melodien der Welt" | Orchester Anthony Ventura |
| 26 May | "Der Nippel" | Mike Krüger | "Die schonsten Melodien der Welt" | Orchester Anthony Ventura |
| 2 June | "Der Nippel" | Mike Krüger | "Die schonsten Melodien der Welt" | Orchester Anthony Ventura |
| 9 June | "Der Nippel" | Mike Krüger | "Die schonsten Melodien der Welt" | Orchester Anthony Ventura |
| 16 June | "Der Nippel" | Mike Krüger | "Die schonsten Melodien der Welt" | Orchester Anthony Ventura |
| 23 June | "Der Nippel" | Mike Krüger | "Die schonsten Melodien der Welt" | Orchester Anthony Ventura |
| 30 June | "Funkytown" | Lipps Inc. | "Die schonsten Melodien der Welt" | Orchester Anthony Ventura |
| 7 July | "Funkytown" | Lipps Inc. | "Die schonsten Melodien der Welt" | Orchester Anthony Ventura |
| 14 July | "Funkytown" | Lipps Inc. | "Die schonsten Melodien der Welt" | Orchester Anthony Ventura |
| 21 July | "Funkytown" | Lipps Inc. | "Die schonsten Melodien der Welt" | Orchester Anthony Ventura |
| 28 July | "Funkytown" | Lipps Inc. | "20 Greatest Hits" | Hot Chocolate |
| 4 August | "Funkytown" | Lipps Inc. | "20 Greatest Hits" | Hot Chocolate |
| 11 August | "Funkytown" | Lipps Inc. | "20 Greatest Hits" | Hot Chocolate |
| 18 August | "Funkytown" | Lipps Inc. | "20 Greatest Hits" | Hot Chocolate |
| 25 August | "Funkytown" | Lipps Inc. | "20 Greatest Hits" | Hot Chocolate |
| 1 September | "Funkytown" | Lipps Inc. | "20 Greatest Hits" | Hot Chocolate |
| 8 September | "Xanadu" | Olivia Newton-John & ELO | "20 Greatest Hits" | Hot Chocolate |
| 15 September | "Xanadu" | Olivia Newton-John & ELO | "Xanadu" | Olivia Newton-John & ELO |
| 22 September | "Santa Maria" | Oliver Onions | "Revanche" | Peter Maffay |
| 29 September | "Santa Maria" | Oliver Onions | "Revanche" | Peter Maffay |
| 6 October | "Santa Maria" | Oliver Onions | "Revanche" | Peter Maffay |
| 13 October | "Santa Maria" | Oliver Onions | "Revanche" | Peter Maffay |
| 20 October | "Santa Maria" | Oliver Onions | "Revanche" | Peter Maffay |
| 27 October | "Santa Maria" | Oliver Onions | "Revanche" | Peter Maffay |
| 3 November | "Santa Maria" | Roland Kaiser | "Beautiful Moments" | Carpenters |
| 10 November | "Santa Maria" | Roland Kaiser | "Revanche" | Peter Maffay |
| 17 November | "Santa Maria" | Roland Kaiser | "Revanche" | Peter Maffay |
| 24 November | "Santa Maria" | Roland Kaiser | "James Last spielt Robert Stolz" | James Last |
| 1 December | "Santa Maria" | Roland Kaiser | "James Last spielt Robert Stolz" | James Last |
| 8 December | "Woman in Love" | Barbra Streisand | "Super Trouper" | ABBA |
| 15 December | "Woman in Love" | Barbra Streisand | "Träumereien 2" | Richard Clayderman |
| 22 December | "Super Trouper" | ABBA | "Super Trouper" | ABBA |
| 29 December | "Super Trouper" | ABBA | "Träumereien 2" | Richard Clayderman |

== See also ==
- List of number-one hits (Germany)
