= List of Dutch Top 40 number-one singles of 1980 =

These hits topped the Dutch Top 40 in 1980.

Issue Date	Song	Artist(s)	Reference
5 January	"Weekend"	Earth and Fire	
12 January	"I Have a Dream"	ABBA	
19 January	"I Have a Dream"	ABBA	
26 January	"I Have a Dream"	ABBA	
2 February	"Rapper's Delight"	The Sugarhill Gang	
9 February	"Rapper's Delight"	The Sugarhill Gang	
16 February	"Rapper's Delight"	The Sugarhill Gang	
23 February	"Crying"	Don McLean	
1 March	"Crying"	Don McLean	
8 March	"Crying"	Don McLean	
15 March	"Crying"	Don McLean	
22 March	"Crying"	Don McLean	
29 March	"Pearlydumm"	BZN	
5 April	"Sajang é"	Massada	
12 April	"Sajang é"	Massada	
19 April	"You and Me"	Spargo	
26 April	"You and Me"	Spargo	
3 May	"You and Me"	Spargo	
10 May	"Sun of Jamaica"	Goombay Dance Band	
17 May	"Sun of Jamaica"	Goombay Dance Band	
24 May	"Sun of Jamaica"	Goombay Dance Band	
31 May	"Funkytown"	Lipps Inc	
7 June	"Funkytown"	Lipps Inc	
14 June	"Funkytown"	Lipps Inc	
21 June	"Cara Mia"	Jay and the Americans	
28 June	"Cara Mia"	Jay and the Americans	
5 July	"Cara Mia"	Jay and the Americans	
12 July	"Late at Night"	Maywood	
19 July	"Late at Night"	Maywood	
26 July	"Late at Night"	Maywood	
2 August	"Xanadu"	Olivia Newton-John and Electric Light Orchestra	
9 August	"Xanadu"	Olivia Newton-John and Electric Light Orchestra	
16 August	"Xanadu"	Olivia Newton-John and Electric Light Orchestra	
23 August	"The Winner Takes It All"	ABBA	
30 August	"The Winner Takes It All"	ABBA	
6 September	"The Winner Takes It All"	ABBA	
13 September	"The Winner Takes It All"	ABBA	
20 September	"The Winner Takes It All"	ABBA	
27 September	"The Winner Takes It All"	ABBA	
4 October	"One Day I'll Fly Away"	Randy Crawford	
11 October	"One Day I'll Fly Away"	Randy Crawford	
18 October	"Woman in Love"	Barbra Streisand	
25 October	"Woman in Love"	Barbra Streisand	
1 November	"Woman in Love"	Barbra Streisand	
8 November	"Woman in Love"	Barbra Streisand	
15 November	"Woman in Love"	Barbra Streisand	
22 November	"Woman in Love"	Barbra Streisand	
29 November	"Never Knew Love Like This Before"	Stephanie Mills	
6 December	"Super Trouper"	ABBA	
13 December	"Super Trouper"	ABBA	
20 December	"Santa Maria"	Roland Kaiser	
27 December	No Top 40 released		

== See also ==
- 1980 in music
