= List of Cash Box Top 100 number-one singles of 1980 =

These are the number-one hits on the Top 100 Singles chart in 1980 as published by Cash Box magazine.

Key
†	Indicates best-performing single of 1980

Issue date	Song	Artist
January 5	"Escape (The Piña Colada Song)"	Rupert Holmes
January 12	"Rock with You"	Michael Jackson
January 19	"Rock with You"	Michael Jackson
January 26	"Rock with You"	Michael Jackson
February 2	"Do That to Me One More Time"	Captain & Tennille
February 9	"Coward of the County"	Kenny Rogers
February 16	"Cruisin'"	Smokey Robinson
February 23	"Crazy Little Thing Called Love"	Queen
March 1	"Crazy Little Thing Called Love"	Queen
March 8	"Crazy Little Thing Called Love"	Queen
March 15	"Longer"	Dan Fogelberg
March 22	"Another Brick in the Wall (Part II)"	Pink Floyd
March 29	"Another Brick in the Wall (Part II)"	Pink Floyd
April 5	"Another Brick in the Wall (Part II)"	Pink Floyd
April 12	"Call Me"	Blondie
April 19	"Call Me"	Blondie
April 26	"Call Me"	Blondie
May 3	"Call Me"	Blondie
May 10	"Call Me"	Blondie
May 17	"Call Me"	Blondie
May 24	"Call Me"	Blondie
May 31	"Funkytown"	Lipps Inc
June 7	"Funkytown"	Lipps Inc
June 14	"Funkytown"	Lipps Inc
June 21	"Funkytown"	Lipps Inc
June 28	"Funkytown"	Lipps Inc
July 5	"The Rose"	Bette Midler
July 12	"It's Still Rock and Roll to Me"	Billy Joel
July 19	"It's Still Rock and Roll to Me"	Billy Joel
July 26	"It's Still Rock and Roll to Me"	Billy Joel
August 2	"Magic"	Olivia Newton-John
August 9	"Magic"	Olivia Newton-John
August 16	"Magic"	Olivia Newton-John
August 23	"Take Your Time (Do It Right)"	S.O.S. Band
August 30	"Sailing"	Christopher Cross
September 6	"Sailing"	Christopher Cross
September 13	"Upside Down"	Diana Ross
September 20	"Upside Down"	Diana Ross
September 27	"Upside Down"	Diana Ross
October 4	"Another One Bites the Dust" †	Queen
October 11	"Another One Bites the Dust" †	Queen
October 18	"Another One Bites the Dust" †	Queen
October 25	"Another One Bites the Dust" †	Queen
November 1	"Woman in Love"	Barbra Streisand
November 8	"Woman in Love"	Barbra Streisand
November 15	"Lady"	Kenny Rogers
November 22	"Lady"	Kenny Rogers
November 29	"Lady"	Kenny Rogers
December 6	"Master Blaster (Jammin')"	Stevie Wonder
December 13	"Master Blaster (Jammin')"	Stevie Wonder
December 20	"Lady"	Kenny Rogers
December 27	"(Just Like) Starting Over"	John Lennon

== See also ==
- 1980 in music
- List of Hot 100 number-one singles of 1980 (U.S.)
