= Designer Music =

Studio album by Lipps Inc.
- Released: 1981
- Genre: Post-disco, new wave, synthpop
- Length: 32:44
- Label: Casablanca NBLP 7262
- Producer: Steven Greenberg

Lipps Inc. chronology
Pucker Up (1980)	Designer Music (1981)	4 (1983)

Designer Music is the third album by American disco act Lipps Inc., and the last featuring Cynthia Johnson on lead vocals. It was released in 1981 on Casablanca Records.

The tracks "Hold Me Down" along with the title track became a hit in 1981 peaking at number 11 on the American dance chart. While the song "Designer Music" failed to catch real attention in American dance charts, it made a lasting imprint in the Mexican and Philippine Disco scenes during the early 1980s as it was a certified disco smash hit and is a staple in discos being held at any part of the country.

== Track listing ==
Side one

1. "Designer Music" – 5:40
2. "Hold Me Down" – 5:25
3. "The One" – 3:42
4. "The One After" – 2:10

Side two

1. "Everybody Knows" – 4:36
2. "I Need Some Cash" – 4:57
3. "Background Singer" – 2:23
4. "Things Take Time" – 3:51

== Personnel ==
- Cynthia Johnson – lead vocals
- Roger Dumas – synthesizer
- Terry Grant – bass
- Steven Greenberg – synthesizer, bass, drums, keyboards
- Scott Jones – keyboards, vocals
- Ivan Rafowitz – synthesizer, keyboards
- André Cymone – vocals
- Rockie Robbins – vocals
- Melanie Rosales – vocals
- Robert Schnitzer – guitar
- Bobby Vandell – drums

== Certifications ==
Region	Certification	Certified units/sales
Hong Kong (IFPI Hong Kong)	Platinum	20,000^{*}
Mexico (AMPROFON)	3× Platinum	750,000^{^}
^{*} Sales figures based on certification alone.^{^} Shipments figures based on certification alone.
