= Stallion (band) =

Stallion was an American pop rock group from Denver, Colorado that was signed to Casablanca Records in the 1970s. The group scored a Top 40 hit in 1977 with its song "Old Fashioned Boy (You're the One)", which peaked at #37 on the Billboard Hot 100 chart. The group's follow-up single, "Magic of the Music", reached the Bubbling Under chart at #108 later in 1977; this was their last charting single. Both singles were taken from their self-titled 1976 debut album; a follow-up album, Hey Everybody, was released late in 1977, and would be their last.

A poster for Stallion can be seen on the wall in the music video for Push th' Little Daisies by Ween.

== Members ==
- Buddy Stephens - vocals
- Danny O'Neil - guitar
- Wally Damrick - keyboards
- Jorg Gonzalez - bass
- Larry Thompson - drums
- Randy Lee Crain - keyboards (later)

== Discography ==
- Stallion (Casablanca Records, 1976) U.S. #191
- Hey Everybody (Casablanca, 1977)
