= Mouth to Mouth (Lipps Inc. album) =

Studio album by Lipps Inc.
- Released: November 1, 1979
- Studio: Sound 80
- Genres: Disco; funk
- Length: 29:49
- Label: Casablanca
- Producer: Steven Greenberg

Lipps Inc. chronology
Mouth to Mouth (1979)	Pucker Up (1980)

Singles from Mouth to Mouth
- 1. "Rock It" Released: 1979; 2. "Funkytown" Released: March 11, 1980

Professional ratings
Review scores
Source	Rating
AllMusic	3/5 stars
Robert Christgau	C

Mouth to Mouth is the debut studio album by the American disco/funk group Lipps Inc., released in November 1979 by Casablanca Records. It spawned the worldwide platinum hit "Funkytown", which reached #1 in 28 countries. The album was mostly arranged and produced by Steven Greenberg, who also played multiple instruments on the album.

== Track listing ==
- All songs written by Steven Greenberg, except where noted.

Side A

1. "Funkytown" – 7:50
2. "All Night Dancing" – 8:20

Side B

1. "Rock It" – 5:40
2. "Power" – 7:59 (Sandy Atlas, Steven Greenberg)

== Personnel ==
- Cynthia Johnson – lead vocals, backing vocals, saxophone
- Terry Grant – bass
- Tom Riopelle, David Rivkin – guitars
- Steven Greenberg – keyboards, synthesizers, bass, drums, percussion, additional vocals
- Roger Dumas, Ivan Rafowitz – keyboards, synthesizers
- Dana Greenberg – backing vocals
- Joyce Lapinsky – backing vocals
- Jack Gillespie, Richard Jorgenson, Dale Mendenhal, Bruce Allard – horns
- Brian Mintz, Karl Nashan, Herman Straka, Bruce Allard, Bob Zelnick – violins

== Production ==
- Arranged & produced by Steven Greenberg
- Recorded & mixed by David Rivkin; assisted by Mike Severson
- Mastered by Chris Bellman

== Charts ==
=== Weekly charts ===
Chart (1980)	Peak position
Australian Albums (Kent Music Report)	57
Austrian Albums (Ö3 Austria)	7
Canada Top Albums/CDs (RPM)	12
Dutch Albums (Album Top 100)	23
German Albums (Offizielle Top 100)	11
Norwegian Albums (VG-lista)	21
Swedish Albums (Sverigetopplistan)	10
US Billboard 200	5
US Top R&B/Hip-Hop Albums (Billboard)	5

=== Year-end charts ===
Chart (1980)	Position
Canada Top Albums/CDs (RPM)	63
German Albums (Offizielle Top 100)	69
US Billboard 200	58
US Top R&B/Hip-Hop Albums (Billboard)	28

== Sales and certifications ==
Region	Certification	Certified units/sales
Canada (Music Canada)	Gold	50,000^{^}
France (SNEP)	Gold	100,000^{*}
Hong Kong (IFPI Hong Kong)	Platinum	20,000^{*}
Mexico	—	400,000
United States (RIAA)	Gold	500,000^{^}
Summaries
Worldwide	—	1,500,000
^{*} Sales figures based on certification alone.^{^} Shipments figures based on certification alone.
