= List of Billboard Hot 100 number ones of 1980 =

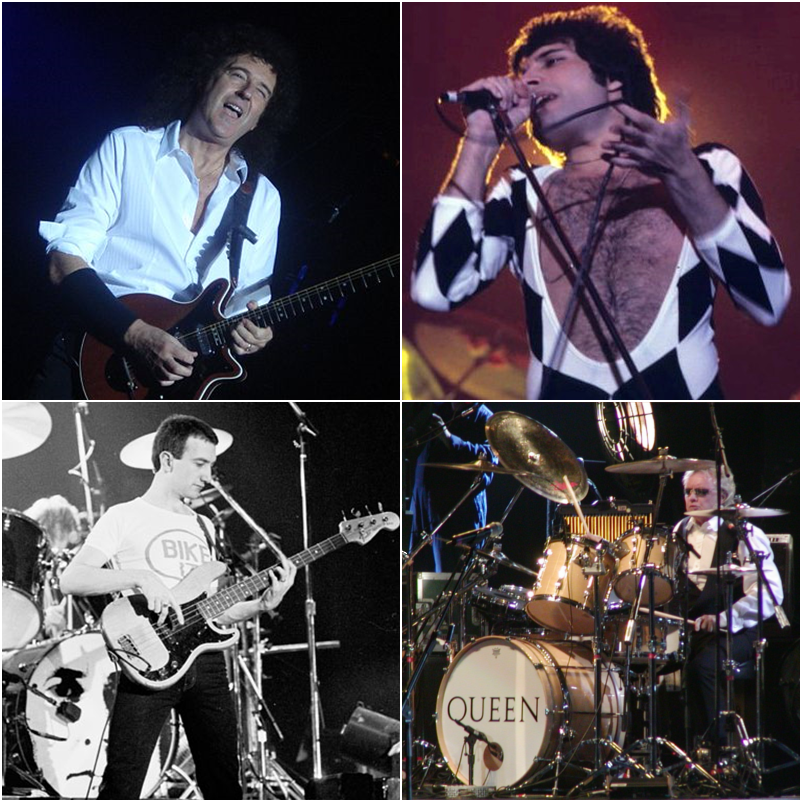
Queen scored two number ones in 1980 with "Crazy Little Thing Called Love" and "Another One Bites the Dust".

The Billboard Hot 100 is a chart published since August 1958 by Billboard magazine which ranks the best-performing singles in the United States. In 1980, it was compiled based on a combination of sales and airplay data sourced from surveys of retail outlets and playlists submitted by radio stations, respectively. During the year, 17 different singles spent time at number one.

In the issue of Billboard dated January 5, KC and the Sunshine Band moved into the number-one position with "Please Don't Go", displacing the final chart-topper of 1979, "Escape (The Piña Colada Song)" by Rupert Holmes. The following week, Holmes's single returned to the top spot for one further week. The British rock band Queen reached the top spot for the first time in February with "Crazy Little Thing Called Love". The group returned to number one in October with "Another One Bites the Dust" and was the only act with more than one Hot 100 number one during 1980. Although Queen is one of the best-selling acts of all time, with reported sales of more than 300 million records, the band's two number ones in 1980 were its only Hot 100 chart-toppers. "Crazy Little Thing Called Love" was replaced at number one by another single by a successful British band, "Another Brick in the Wall, Part II" by Pink Floyd. It was the first and only Hot 100 number one for the group, which had been active since the 1960s and is also one of the best-selling acts of all time. The next chart-topper, "Call Me" by Blondie, was the first of two singles to spend six consecutive weeks at number one in 1980, the most by any single.

Between May and August, Lipps Inc., Billy Joel, and Christopher Cross all topped the Hot 100 for the first time. "Funkytown", the first charting single for Lipps Inc., spent four weeks at number one, but after one more single, which only reached number 64, the act's Hot 100 career ended. In contrast, Joel was still having top 10 success in the 1990s and was inducted into the Rock and Roll Hall of Fame in 1999. Kenny Rogers gained his first Hot 100 number one in November 1980 with "Lady". The singer had first entered the chart in the late 1960s as the leader of the First Edition (later Kenny Rogers and the First Edition), but had launched a highly successful solo career in the country music genre after the break-up of that group, achieving nine number ones on the Hot Country Singles chart between April 1977 and January 1980. "Lady", written by Lionel Richie, was his biggest crossover success to date, topping both the country and pop charts as well as Billboard's Adult Contemporary listing and even entering the Hot Soul Singles chart; its six weeks atop the Hot 100 tied for the year's longest run at number one. The year's final chart-topper was "(Just Like) Starting Over" by John Lennon, which moved into the top spot in the issue of Billboard dated December 27. It was the first new song released by Lennon since 1975 and was intended to be the start of a comeback for the singer, but it proved to be a posthumous number one after he was murdered on December 8.

== Chart history ==
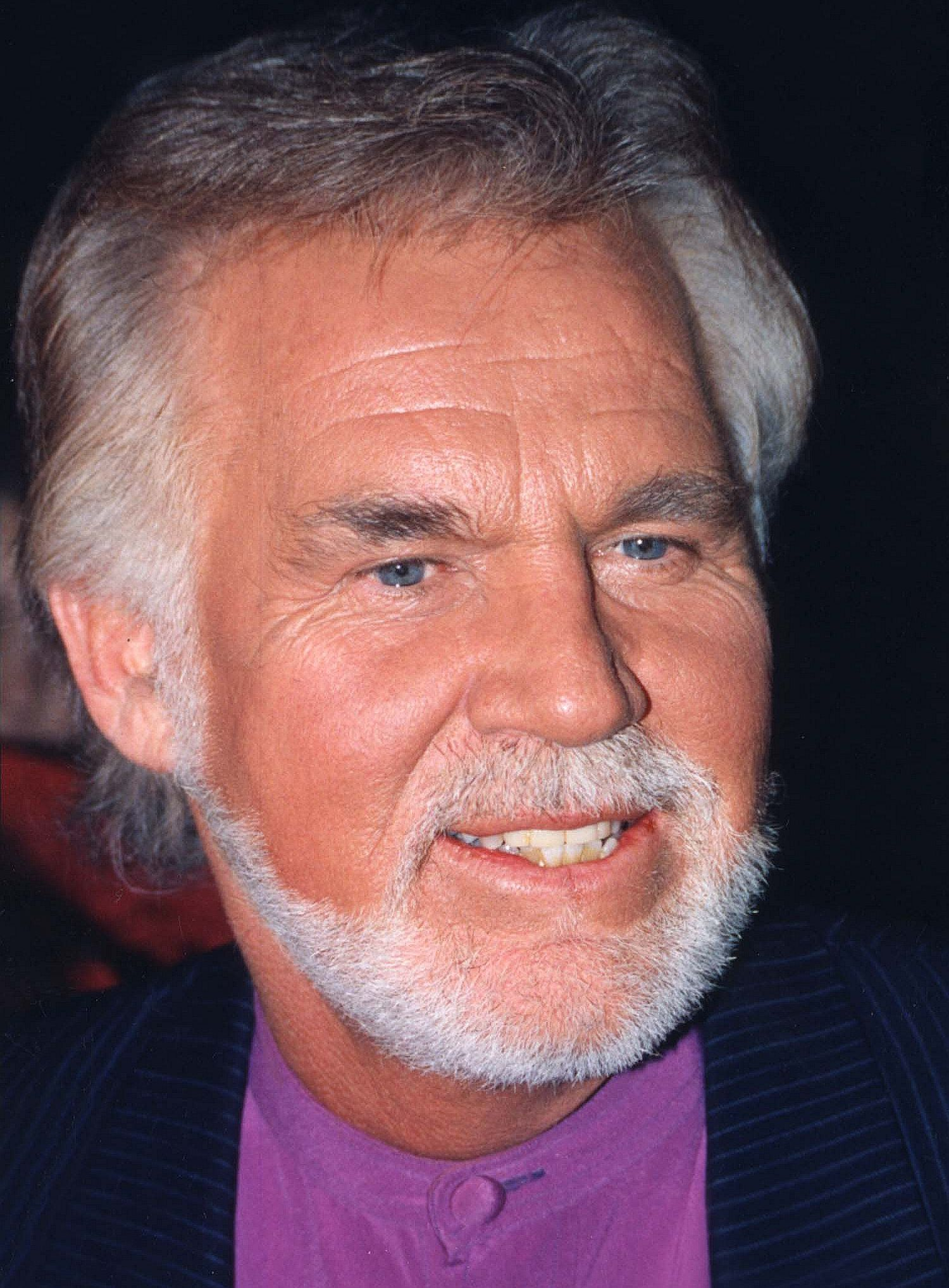
Kenny Rogers (pictured in 1997) spent six weeks at number one with "Lady".

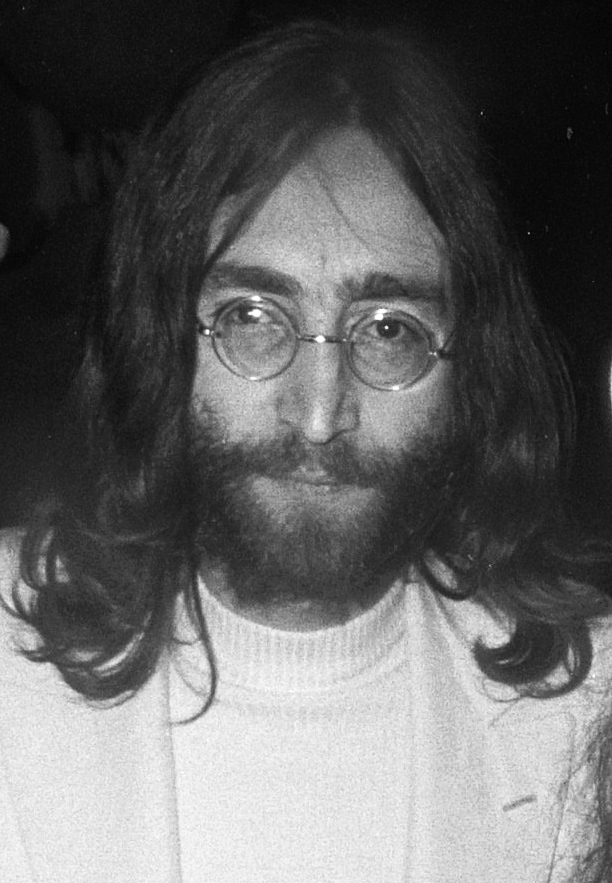
John Lennon (pictured in 1969) had a posthumous number one with "(Just Like) Starting Over" after he was murdered in December 1980.

"It's Still Rock and Roll to Me" was the first chart-topper for Billy Joel (pictured in 2009).

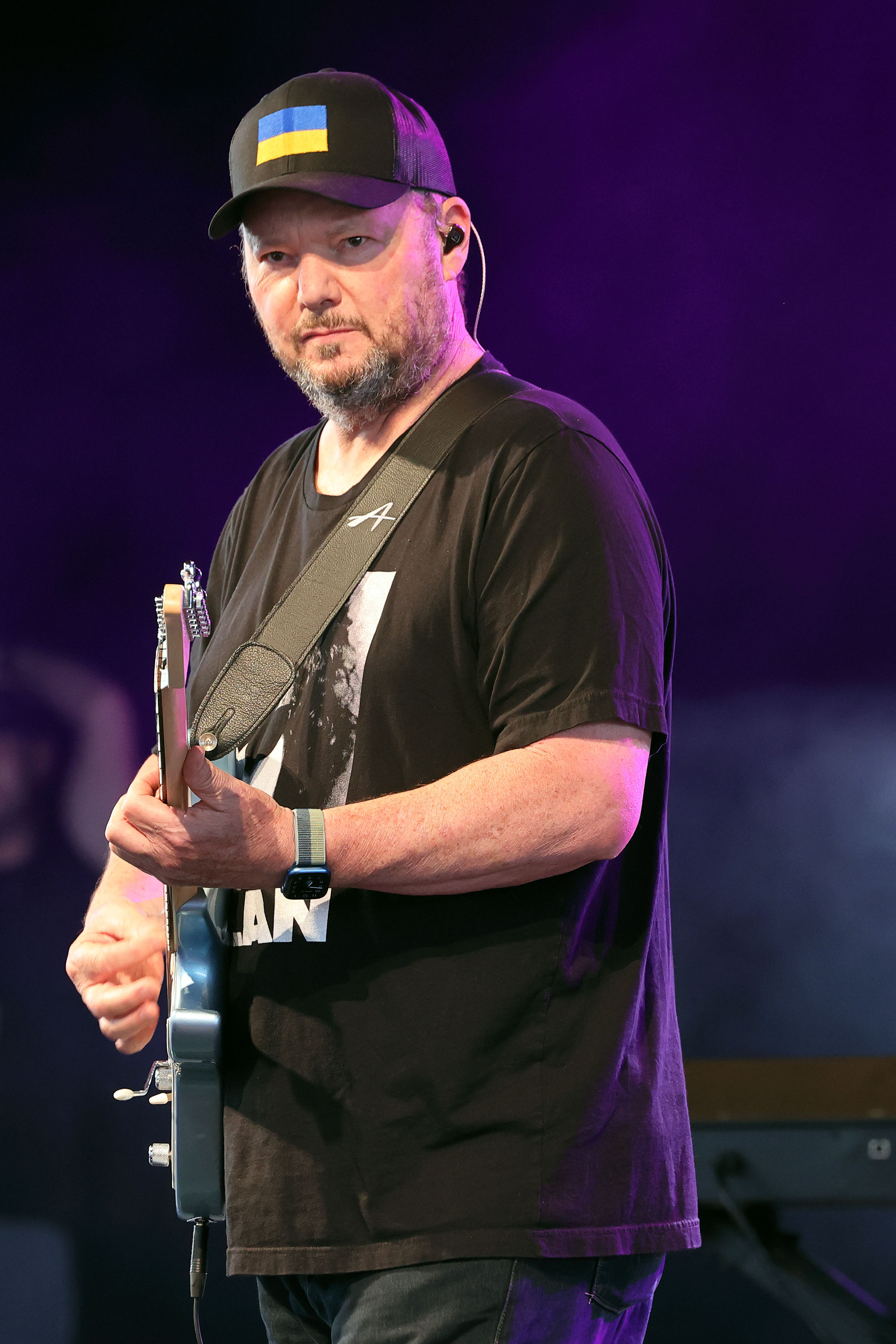
Christopher Cross (pictured in 2022) spent a single week in the top spot with "Sailing".

Chart history
No. (Note: The "No." column indicates the numerical sequence of number ones in Hot 100 history. "Re" indicates a single returning to number one.)	Issue date	Title	Artist(s)	Ref.
480	January 5	"Please Don't Go"	KC and the Sunshine Band	
479 (re)	January 12	"Escape (The Piña Colada Song)"	Rupert Holmes	
481	January 19	"Rock with You"	Michael Jackson	
481	January 26	"Rock with You"	Michael Jackson	
481	February 2	"Rock with You"	Michael Jackson	
481	February 9	"Rock with You"	Michael Jackson	
482	February 16	"Do That to Me One More Time"	Captain & Tennille	
483	February 23	"Crazy Little Thing Called Love"	Queen	
483	March 1	"Crazy Little Thing Called Love"	Queen	
483	March 8	"Crazy Little Thing Called Love"	Queen	
483	March 15	"Crazy Little Thing Called Love"	Queen	
484	March 22	"Another Brick in the Wall, Part II"	Pink Floyd	
484	March 29	"Another Brick in the Wall, Part II"	Pink Floyd	
484	April 5	"Another Brick in the Wall, Part II"	Pink Floyd	
484	April 12	"Another Brick in the Wall, Part II"	Pink Floyd	
485	April 19	"Call Me"	Blondie	
485	April 26	"Call Me"	Blondie	
485	May 3	"Call Me"	Blondie	
485	May 10	"Call Me"	Blondie	
485	May 17	"Call Me"	Blondie	
485	May 24	"Call Me"	Blondie	
486	May 31	"Funkytown"	Lipps Inc.	
486	June 7	"Funkytown"	Lipps Inc.	
486	June 14	"Funkytown"	Lipps Inc.	
486	June 21	"Funkytown"	Lipps Inc.	
487	June 28	"Coming Up"	Paul McCartney	
487	July 5	"Coming Up"	Paul McCartney	
487	July 12	"Coming Up"	Paul McCartney	
488	July 19	"It's Still Rock and Roll to Me"	Billy Joel	
488	July 26	"It's Still Rock and Roll to Me"	Billy Joel	
489	August 2	"Magic"	Olivia Newton-John	
489	August 9	"Magic"	Olivia Newton-John	
489	August 16	"Magic"	Olivia Newton-John	
489	August 23	"Magic"	Olivia Newton-John	
490	August 30	"Sailing"	Christopher Cross	
491	September 6	"Upside Down"	Diana Ross	
491	September 13	"Upside Down"	Diana Ross	
491	September 20	"Upside Down"	Diana Ross	
491	September 27	"Upside Down"	Diana Ross	
492	October 4	"Another One Bites the Dust"	Queen	
492	October 11	"Another One Bites the Dust"	Queen	
492	October 18	"Another One Bites the Dust"	Queen	
493	October 25	"Woman in Love"	Barbra Streisand	
493	November 1	"Woman in Love"	Barbra Streisand	
493	November 8	"Woman in Love"	Barbra Streisand	
494	November 15	"Lady"	Kenny Rogers	
494	November 22	"Lady"	Kenny Rogers	
494	November 29	"Lady"	Kenny Rogers	
494	December 6	"Lady"	Kenny Rogers	
494	December 13	"Lady"	Kenny Rogers	
494	December 20	"Lady"	Kenny Rogers	
495	December 27	"(Just Like) Starting Over"	John Lennon	

== Number-one artists ==
List of number-one artists by total weeks at number one
Weeks at No. 1	Artist
7	Queen
6	Blondie
6	Kenny Rogers
4	Michael Jackson
4	Pink Floyd
4	Lipps Inc.
4	Olivia Newton-John
4	Diana Ross
3	Paul McCartney
3	Barbra Streisand
2	Billy Joel
1	KC and the Sunshine Band
1	Rupert Holmes
1	Captain & Tennille
1	Christopher Cross
1	John Lennon

== See also ==
- 1980 in music
- List of Cashbox Top 100 number-one singles of 1980
- Lists of Billboard number-one singles
- List of Billboard Hot 100 number-one singles of the 1980s
