= Funkytown =

Lipps Inc. single from 1980

- Side A of US 7-inch vinyl single

Single by Lipps Inc.

from the album Mouth to Mouth
- B-side: "All Night Dancing"
- Released: March 11, 1980
- Studio: Sound 80 (Minneapolis, Minnesota)
- Genre: Funk; disco; Minneapolis sound; synth-pop; dance-pop
- Length: 7:50 (album version); 3:55 (single version); 2:45 (video version)
- Label: Casablanca
- Songwriter: Steven Greenberg
- Producer: Steven Greenberg

Lipps Inc. singles chronology
"Rock It" (1979)	"Funkytown" (1980)	"How Long" (1980)

Music video
- "Funkytown" on YouTube at Musikladen

"Funkytown" is a song by American disco-funk group Lipps Inc., written and produced by Steven Greenberg and released by Casablanca Records in March 1980 as the second single from the group's debut studio album, Mouth to Mouth (1979). The track was met with immediate commercial success, reaching number one on various record charts in different countries including Australia, Belgium, Canada, France, New Zealand, Spain, West Germany and on the US Billboard Hot 100. It quickly became the group's signature song, selling over eight million copies worldwide and becoming their most successful song.

== Composition and lyrics ==
Sung by Lipps Inc.'s lead vocalist Cynthia Johnson, the tune features the narrator pining for a metaphorical place that will "keep me movin', keep me groovin' with some energy", while Lipps Inc. members were dreaming of relocating from Minneapolis to New York City. The song is in 4/4 time with a key of C major.

== Chart performance ==
In the United States, "Funkytown" entered the Billboard Hot 100 on March 29, 1980 and spent four weeks at number one, from May 31 to June 21, 1980. It also topped the Disco Top 60 chart for four non-consecutive weeks and peaked at number two on the Hot Soul Singles chart for four weeks also, from May 24 to June 21, 1980. "Funkytown" was first certified Gold by the Recording Industry Association of America (RIAA) on May 23, 1980 and later Platinum on July 17, 1980. Billboard magazine ranked the song as the eighth most popular single of 1980. It is Lipps Inc.'s only US Top 40 hit single.

Elsewhere, "Funkytown" was a number-one hit in countries including Australia, Austria, Belgium, Canada, France, Israel, the Netherlands, New Zealand, Norway, Spain, Switzerland and West Germany, and peaked at number two in Finland, Sweden and on the UK Singles Chart.

== Music videos ==
"Funkytown" has at least two music videos. In one, an unidentified Black woman lip synching Johnson's vocals dances with some women in a pub. In another video, Doris D, who fronted Lipps Inc. in the Netherlands and West Germany, dances while lip synching the vocals. Johnson's website says the singer had never been asked to perform in a video of "Funkytown".

== Legacy and impact ==
In 1997, DJ John Acquaviva listed "Funkytown" with his top ten tracks, saying "It's always been one of my favorite songs. It's got an amazing bassline that sounds great on a good system and people love it." In October 2000, VH1 ranked the song number 64 in their list of "100 Greatest Dance Songs". In 2003, English music journalist Paul Morley included it in his list of "Greatest Pop Single of All Time". In 2009, it was ranked number 94 on Entertainment Weekly's "The 100 Greatest Summer Songs": "This one-hit wonder belonged to the tail end of the disco era but also presaged the techno-pop epoch about to come ... totally synthetic, totally cool." Same year, VH1 ranked the song number 37 on its list of the "100 Greatest One Hit Wonders of the 1980s". In 2018, Time Out ranked it number 44 on its list of "The 100 best party songs", writing, "'Funkytown' expresses a simple, repetitive yearning for the pulse of a bigger city, goosed by a killer ten-note synth riff. "Gotta make a move to a town that's right for me", sings Cynthia Johnson in a robotic, vocoderized voice (a precursor to the Auto-Tune sound) before busting out an unmodified, soulful wail, pleading for a trip to the party destination of her dreams. Released in 1980, 'Funkytown' came late to the disco party, but gave it a jolt of electricity." In 2018, ThoughtCo. ranked the song number seven on its list of the "25 Best Dance Pop Songs of All Time".

== Track listing and formats ==
All tracks were written and produced by Steven Greenberg.

- US 7-inch vinyl single (810 326-7)

A1. "Funkytown" – 3:57
B1. "All Night Dancing" – 3:09

- Australian 12-inch vinyl single (6198 342)

A1. "Funkytown" – 7:46
B1. "All Night Dancing" – 8:18

- Mexican 12-inch vinyl single (3027)

A1. "Funkytown" (Super Disco version) – 12:43
B1. "All Night Dancing" – 3:09

== Charts ==
=== Weekly charts ===
Chart (1980)	Peak position
Argentina (Prensario)	9
Australia (Kent Music Report)	1
Austria (Ö3 Austria Top 40)	1
Belgium (Ultratop 50 Flanders)	1
Canada Top Singles (RPM)	1
Europe (Eurochart Hot 100)	1
Finland (Suomen virallinen lista)	2
France (IFOP)	1
Ireland (IRMA)	3
Italy (Musica e dischi)	5
Netherlands (Dutch Top 40)	1
Netherlands (Single Top 100)	1
New Zealand (Recorded Music NZ)	1
Norway (VG-lista)	1
South Africa (Springbok Radio)	5
Spain (AFE)	1
Sweden (Sverigetopplistan)	2
Switzerland (Schweizer Hitparade)	1
UK Singles (Official Charts)	2
US Billboard Hot 100	1
US Disco Top 60 (Billboard) (with "All Night Dancing")	1
US Hot Soul Singles (Billboard)	2
US Cash Box Top 100	1
US Record World Singles	1
West Germany (GfK)	1

=== Year-end charts ===
Chart (1980)	Rank
Australia (Kent Music Report)	9
Austria (Ö3 Austria Top 40)	4
Belgium (Ultratop 50 Flanders)	3
Canada Top Singles (RPM)	14
Netherlands (Dutch Top 40)	5
Netherlands (Single Top 100)	10
New Zealand (Recorded Music NZ)	7
Spain (AFE)	2
Switzerland (Schweizer Hitparade)	2
US Billboard Hot 100	8
US Cash Box Top 100	10

== Certifications and sales ==
Region	Certification	Certified units/sales
Australia (ARIA)	Platinum	100,000^{^}
Canada (Music Canada)	2× Platinum	300,000
Denmark (IFPI Danmark)	Gold	45,000^{‡}
France (SNEP)	Gold	500,000^{*}
Germany (BVMI)	Gold	500,000^{^}
Mexico	—	1,000,000
New Zealand (RMNZ)	Platinum	30,000^{‡}
United Kingdom (BPI) Physical sales	Silver	250,000^{^}
United Kingdom (BPI) Digital sales + streams since 2004	Gold	400,000^{‡}
United States (RIAA)	2× Platinum	3,000,000
Summaries
Worldwide	—	8,000,000
^{*} Sales figures based on certification alone.^{^} Shipments figures based on certification alone.^{‡} Sales+streaming figures based on certification alone.

== Pseudo Echo version ==
"Funkytown"

Single by Pseudo Echo

from the album Love an Adventure
- B-side: "Lies Are Nothing"
- Released: November 17, 1986
- Recorded: 1985
- Genre: Rock; dance-rock
- Length: 4:54 (Australian single version/video mix); 3:40 (single version); 6:35 (Australian album version/dance mix)
- Label: RCA; EMI
- Songwriter: Steven Greenberg
- Producer: Brian Canham

Pseudo Echo singles chronology
"Try" (1986)	"Funkytown" (1986)	"Take On the World" (1987)

Music video
- "Funkytown" on YouTube

In 1986, "Funkytown" was covered as "Funky Town" by Australian new wave band Pseudo Echo in rock form on their album Love an Adventure. It peaked at number one for seven weeks in Australia and six weeks in New Zealand. It was also a hit internationally, reaching the top 10 in Canada (#1), South Africa (#2), Sweden (#9), the UK (#8), and the US (#6).

=== Track listing and formats ===
- US 7-inch vinyl single (EMI 1883)

A1. "Funkytown" – 3:40
B1. "Lies Are Nothing" – 3:58

- 12-inch vinyl maxi single (ED 237) / (RCA 5217–7)

A1. "Funkytown" (Dance Mix) – 6:32
B1. "Funkytown" – 3:40
B2. "Lies Are Nothing" – 3:58

=== Charts ===
==== Weekly charts ====
Chart (1986–1987)	Peak position
Australia (Kent Music Report)	1
Austria (Ö3 Austria Top 40)	13
Belgium (Ultratop 50 Flanders)	40
Canada Top Singles (RPM)	1
Ireland (IRMA)	12
Italy Airplay (Music & Media)	17
New Zealand (Recorded Music NZ)	1
South Africa (Springbok Radio)	2
Sweden (Sverigetopplistan)	9
Switzerland (Schweizer Hitparade)	11
UK Singles (Official Charts)	8
US Billboard Hot 100	6
US Dance Club Songs (Billboard)	4
US Dance/Electronic Singles Sales (Billboard)	1
US Cash Box Top 100	12
West Germany (GfK)	16

==== Year-end charts ====
Chart (1986)	Rank
Australia (Kent Music Report)	93

Chart (1987)	Rank
Australia (Kent Music Report)	19
Canada Top Singles (RPM)	17
New Zealand (Recorded Music NZ)	1
US Billboard Hot 100	99
US Dance/Electronic Singles Sales (Billboard)	37

Chart (1988)	Rank
South Africa (Springbok Radio)	18

=== Certifications and sales ===
Region	Certification	Certified units/sales
Canada (Music Canada)	Gold	50,000^{^}
New Zealand (RMNZ)	Gold	10,000^{*}
^{*} Sales figures based on certification alone.^{^} Shipments figures based on certification alone.

== See also ==
- List of one-hit wonders in the United States
- List of number-one singles in Australia during the 1980s
- Lists of number-one singles (Austria)
- List of Billboard Hot 100 number-one singles of 1980
- List of number-one dance singles of 1980 (U.S.)
- List of Cash Box Top 100 number-one singles of 1980
- List of number-one singles of 1980 (Canada)
- List of number-one singles of 1987 (Canada)
- List of Dutch Top 40 number-one singles of 1980
- List of European number-one hits of 1980
- List of number-one singles of 1980 (France)
- List of number-one hits of 1980 (Germany)
- List of number-one singles from the 1980s (New Zealand)
- List of number-one songs in Norway
- List of number-one singles of the 1980s (Switzerland)
