= Lonnie Hunter =

American gospel musician (born 1965)

- Born: Lonnie V. Hunter III; July 20, 1965 (age 61); Harvey, Illinois
- Origin: Chicago, Illinois
- Genres: Gospel, urban contemporary gospel
- Occupations: Singer, songwriter
- Instruments: Vocals, singer-songwriter
- Years active: 1998–present
- Labels: Muscle Shoals, Black Smoke, Tyscot
- Website: lonniehuntermusic.com

Lonnie V. Hunter III (born July 20, 1965) is an American gospel musician. He started his music career, in 1998, with the release of Lonnie Hunter & The Voices of St. Mark by Muscle Shoals Records. His second album, Next Level, was released by Muscle Shoals in 2003. The third album, I'm Back, was released by Black Smoke Music Worldwide in 2011. This was his breakthrough album on the Billboard magazine charts placing on the Billboard 200 along with the Gospel Albums and Independent Albums chart. As of 2015, he is signed to Tyscot Records, for his next release. Hunter is the voice of the 2015 Stellar Awards.

== Early life ==
Hunter was born on July 20, 1965, in Harvey, Illinois, as Lonnie V. Hunter III, to father Lonnie V. Hunter, Jr. and mother Marie. He has a sister, Cherie, which Lonnie is the youngest of five children. Hunter received his bachelor's degree in Public Administration/Public Relations by Western Illinois University. He served five years in the U.S. Air Force, and was part of their Jazz band.

== Music career ==
His music career began in 1998, with the release of Lonnie Hunter & The Voices of St. Mark on June 23, 1998 by Muscle Shoals Records. His subsequent album with the label, Next Level, was released on February 25, 2003. The third album, I'm Back, was released by Black Smoke Entertainment Worldwide on April 26, 2011. This was his breakthrough released on three Billboard magazine charts, and those placements were on The Billboard 200 at No. 135 along with the Gospel Albums at No. 4 and No. 18 on the Independent Albums chart. Hunter was signed to Tyscot Records, in early 2015, for the release of his next album. He was named the voice of the 2015 Stellar Awards. For several years, he was host of the syndicated Lonnie Hunter Show which broadcast on Radio One. In addition to playing contemporary Gospel music, Lonnie's show featured Clues & Categories game and a weekly Talent Show. His humor, love for music and ministry made the show a top-rated show across the country and revealed Lonnie's genuine love for the people of God as he offered laughter, wisdom and good counsel to his many listeners seeking his advice.

== Personal life ==
Hunter resides in New Jersey and serves as Pastor of Worship of the 26,000 member Bethany Baptist Church in Lindenwold, NJ.

== Discography ==
List of studio albums, with selected chart positions
Title	Album details	Peak chart positions		
Title	Album details	US	US Gos	US Indie
Lonnie Hunter & The Voices of St. Mark	Released: June 23, 1998; Label: Muscle Shoals; CD, digital download	–	–	–
Next Level!	Released: February 25, 2003; Label: Muscle Shoals; CD, digital download	–	–	–
I'm Back	Released: April 26, 2011; Label: Black Smoke; CD, digital download	135	4	18
