= Reneé Austin =

American singer-songwriter

- Born: San Diego, California, United States
- Origin: Texas
- Genres: Gospel, R&B, soul
- Occupations: Singer, songwriter, multi-instrumentalist
- Instruments: Vocals, piano, guitar
- Years active: 1997–2005; 2015–present
- Label: Blind Pig

Reneé Austin is an American soul, R&B, gospel, singer, songwriter, and speaker. She is a six-time Minnesota Music Award Winner, including 'Female Vocalist of the Year'. Austin has a wide vocal range, and has opened for Los Lobos, Tower of Power, Delbert McClinton, Blues Traveler, Big Head Todd & the Monsters, Keb Mo and more. She released three albums between 1997 and 2005, and supplied backing vocals on Tommy Castro's 2005 album, Soul Shaker. Austin was also part of a group of women who performed in Morgan Freeman's PBS Blues Divas, as well as singing for a live WWE season premier, whose television audience was six million. Her singing voice has been compared by critics to those of Mavis Staples, Tina Turner, Gladys Knight, Anita Baker, Regina Belle, and also as a female version of Michael McDonald.

The Philadelphia Inquirer commented that she "embraces a deliciously wide range of roots styles: She swings nimbly on R&B, and fires off some rousing gospel. For good measure, she also shows she can take it uptown with a sultry, soulful ballad."

It was announced in 2005, that her career was finished as following thyroid surgery, she was left with a paralyzed vocal nerve that made speaking and further singing impossible. However, after years of inaction, her voice was miraculously restored, and in 2015, Austin returned to performing.

== Life and career ==
Austin was born in San Diego, California, United States, and at the age of three moved with her family to Kingsland, Texas. Inspired by the singing of Aretha Franklin, Etta James, Mavis Staples and Tina Turner, by 15 years old she had composed her first song. After singing in church from the age of four and into college, Austin relocated to Minneapolis. During her time there she sang in various clubs and independently released her debut album in 1997. Dancin' with Mr. Blue was well received and was named as 'Best Blues Recording' by the Minnesota Music Academy. It also garnered her the 'Best Blues Artist' and 'Best Female Vocalist' awards. Austin won a total of six Minnesota Music Awards from this album.

This early success led to Austin being offered opening slots at concerts by Los Lobos, Robert Cray, and Delbert McClinton in Minneapolis. The latter was impressed enough after a two night gig in March 2003, to ensure that Austin was hired to perform on the Sandy Beaches Blues Cruise.

Her real breakthrough occurred after she signed a recording contract with Blind Pig Records. The label released her second album, Sweet Talk, in 2003. The connection with McClinton continued when they recorded a duet of the blues ballad "Pretend We Never Met". It was written by Bruce McCabe and recorded in Nashville, Tennessee. Sweet Talk also included seven original songs written by Austin, as well as a cover version of "When Something Is Wrong", which was penned by Joanna Cotten. Regarding Sweet Talk, Allmusic noted "her presence is so powerful that she's comfortable in a variety of grooves and, at least on the basis of this album, succeeds at all of them." Sweet Talk was nominated for a Blues Music Award in the 'Best New Artist Debut' category.

She performed at both Memphis in May, as well at festivals and venues coast to coast in the US, Canada, and the Virgin Islands. Austin then appeared in the PBS television production, Blues Divas, in 2005, in a line-up that included one of her influences Mavis Staples, plus Ann Peebles, Denise LaSalle, Odetta, and Irma Thomas. In addition, by then Austin had performed on various festival and concert bills alongside Keb' Mo', Jonny Lang, Blues Traveler and Big Head Todd and the Monsters. Los Lobos brought her up to sing their hit – "La Bamba".

In August 2005, her third album, Right About Love, was issued by Blind Pig. All chances of further promotion and development were put on hold by her upcoming surgical operation in September that year. Although initially deemed a success, the procedure ultimately left her with a paralyzed left vocal nerve, which initially meant that she was unable to perform again.

In 2015, Austin stated, "I never thought I would sing again. I had no hope. I had resigned myself to the fact that it was over. But I've been blessed with a miracle. Now I have a chance to do the thing I love to do most and that is write and perform my music."

In June 2016, doors opened for Austin in acting. In 2017, she filmed two ABC 20/20: In an Instant episodes, a short film and was picked up for representation by NUTS ltd (Non Union Talent Agency).

Austin released Songbirds & Angels in May 2018, with 13 Austin-penned originals. She was the executive producer along with David Grissom, who also played guitar on four songs recorded in Austin, Texas; plus piano/B3 from Joel Guzman, bass from Yoggie Musgrove and Brannen Temple (drums). The other nine songs were recorded in Minneapolis, Minnesota, with producers Douglas A. Smith on piano/B3 and Christopher Furst as engineer and guitar, with Brian Kendrick (drums), Yohannes Tona (bass), Kevin Anderson (guitar) and Mark Arneson (saxophone).

== Discography ==
Year	Title	Record label
1997	Dancin' with Mr. Blue	Oarfin
2003	Sweet Talk	Blind Pig
2005	Right About Love	Blind Pig
2018	Songbirds & Angels	Independent

== See also ==
- List of soul-blues musicians
