= Magic (Olivia Newton-John song) =

1980 single by Olivia Newton-John

- Picture sleeve of the US and Australasian releases

Single by Olivia Newton-John

from the album Xanadu
- B-side: "Fool Country" (US); "Whenever You're Away from Me" (UK)
- Released: May 1980
- Recorded: 1979
- Studio: Musicland (Munich, Germany)
- Genre: Pop; disco; soft rock
- Length: 4:31
- Label: MCA (US); Jet (UK)
- Songwriter: John Farrar
- Producer: John Farrar

Olivia Newton-John singles chronology
| "Rest Your Love on Me" (1980) | "Magic" (1980) | "Xanadu" (1980) |

"Magic" is a song recorded by British-Australian singer Olivia Newton-John for the soundtrack to the 1980 musical fantasy film Xanadu, which starred Newton-John and Gene Kelly. Written and produced by Newton-John's frequent collaborator John Farrar, "Magic" was released as the soundtrack's lead single in May 1980 and topped the US Billboard Hot 100 for four weeks beginning on 2 August. On 30 August, it was displaced from the top by Christopher Cross's "Sailing".

In Canada, "Magic" spent two weeks at No. 1 on the RPM Top Singles chart, and also reached No. 4 in Australia and No. 32 in the United Kingdom. "Magic" became Newton-John's biggest Billboard Adult Contemporary hit, spending five weeks at the top of the chart, and also topped the RPM Adult Contemporary chart for a week. Billboard ranked "Magic" as the third most popular single of 1980. Record World called it an "infectious pop ballad [that] has a big beat production treatment".

Both US and UK B-sides also appear in Xanadu:

- US: "Fool Country" is one of three single B-sides to appear in the film but not on the soundtrack. This is featured in the nightclub grand opening segment following the film's title track and before its reprise.
- UK: "Whenever You're Away from Me" (a duet with co-star Gene Kelly), also appears as the B-side of the US "Xanadu" single.

== Track listing and formats ==
All tracks written and produced by John Farrar.

- US 7-inch vinyl single (MCA Records)

A1. "Magic" – 4:25
B1. "Fool Country" – 2:29

- UK 7-inch vinyl single (Jet Records)

A1. "Magic" – 4:25
B1. "Whenever You're Away from Me" – 4:22

== Personnel ==
- Olivia Newton-John – lead and backing vocals
- John Farrar – electric guitars, electric piano, synthesizers and backing vocals
- David Hungate – bass
- Carlos Vega – drums and percussion

Additional personnel

- Strings arranged and conducted by Richard Hewson
- David J. Holman – engineering and mixing

== Charts ==
=== Weekly charts ===
| Chart (1980) | Peak position |
|---|---|
| Australia (Kent Music Report) | 4 |
| Austria (Ö3 Austria Top 40) | 20 |
| Belgium (Ultratop 50 Flanders) | 18 |
| Canada Top Singles (RPM) | 1 |
| Canada Adult Contemporary (RPM) | 1 |
| Israel (Israeli Singles Chart) | 4 |
| European Singles (Europarade) | 23 |
| Germany (GfK) | 36 |
| Japan (Oricon) | 43 |
| Luxembourg (Radio Luxembourg) | 25 |
| Netherlands (Dutch Top 40) | 12 |
| New Zealand (Recorded Music NZ) | 4 |
| Quebec (ADISQ) | 1 |
| South Africa (Springbok) | 5 |
| Sweden (Sverigetopplistan) | 12 |
| UK Singles (Official Charts) | 32 |
| US Billboard Hot 100 | 1 |
| US Adult Contemporary (Billboard) | 1 |
| US Cash Box Top 100 | 1 |

| Chart (2022) | Peak position |
|---|---|
| Canada Digital Song Sales (Billboard) | 37 |
| US Digital Song Sales (Billboard) | 11 |

=== Year-end charts ===
| Chart (1980) | Rank position |
|---|---|
| Australia (Kent Music Report) | 30 |
| Canada Top Singles (RPM) | 10 |
| New Zealand (Recorded Music NZ) | 36 |
| US Billboard Hot 100 | 3 |

=== All-time charts ===
| Chart (1958–2018) | Rank position |
|---|---|
| US Billboard Hot 100 | 376 |

== Certifications and sales ==
| Region | Certification | Certified units/sales |
|---|---|---|
| Australia (ARIA) | Platinum | 100,000^{^} |
^{^} Shipments figures based on certification alone.

== 2011 version ==
"Magic" (Peach & DJ Dan Murphy remix)

Single by Olivia Newton-John featuring Wacci
- Released: 22 May 2011
- Genre: Electropop, dance-pop
- Length: 3:37
- Songwriter: John Farrar
- Producers: DJ Dan Murphy, Steve Peach

Olivia Newton-John featuring Wacci singles chronology
| "Help Me to Heal" (2010) | "Magic" (Peach & DJ Dan Murphy remix) (2011) | "When You Wish upon a Star" (2011) |

Music video
- "Magic" (Peach & DJ Dan Murphy remix) on YouTube

"Magic (Peach & DJ Dan Murphy remix)" is a remix of the song. In May 2011, it was remixed by two Australians, DJ Dan Murphy and Steve Peach, to create a dance version. Newton-John went back to the studio to re-sing the vocals. The version was sponsored by WACCI, a humanitarian group.

Everybody who worked on the project volunteered their time, with all proceeds being donated to Newton-John's charity, the Olivia Newton-John Cancer and Wellness Centre.

Newton-John was presented the world premiere of the song on the Australian edition of Dancing with the Stars on Sunday 22 May 2011. The song was released exclusively on Australian iTunes that same day.

=== Music video ===
A video was shot for the new remix in Sydney in an attempt to break the Guinness Book World Record for largest cast in a music video by featuring 350 people. Newton-John does not appear in the video, which was directed by DJ Dan Murphy.

=== Charts ===
| Chart (2011) | Peak position |
|---|---|
| Australia (ARIA) | 79 |
| Australia Dance (ARIA) | 19 |

== Cover versions ==
- A version of the song by Stimulator was used in commercials for Macy's. This cover was also used in the film Ella Enchanted and appeared on the film's soundtrack.
- In 2015 Newton-John teamed with her daughter Chloe Lattanzi and Dave Aude to rework the song's chorus into a new recording, "You Have to Believe". The song went to number one on the US Dance Club Songs chart.

== See also ==
- List of Billboard Adult Contemporary number ones of 1980
- List of Billboard Hot 100 number ones of 1980
- List of Cash Box Top 100 number-one singles of 1980
