= Woman in Love =

1980 single by Barbra Streisand

Single by Barbra Streisand

from the album Guilty
- B-side: "Run Wild"
- Released: August 1980
- Studio: Middle Ear (Miami)
- Genre: Soft rock; post-disco
- Length: 3:49
- Label: Columbia
- Songwriters: Barry Gibb; Robin Gibb
- Producer: Gibb-Galuten-Richardson

Barbra Streisand singles chronology
"Kiss Me in the Rain" (1979)	"Woman in Love" (1980)	"Guilty" (1980)

Audio
- "Woman in Love" on YouTube

"Woman in Love" is a song performed by Barbra Streisand and taken from her 1980 album Guilty. The song was written by Barry and Robin Gibb of the Bee Gees, who received the 1980 Ivor Novello award for Best Song Musically and Lyrically. It is her fourth of four Platinum records, and is considered her greatest international hit. After the success enjoyed by the Bee Gees in the late 1970s, the band was asked to participate in musical endeavors for other artists, and Streisand asked Barry Gibb to write an album for her. This album ultimately became Guilty.

"Woman in Love", as the lead single, became one of the most successful songs of Streisand's music career. It reached the number-one position on the Billboard Hot 100 chart, Streisand's fifth (and last as of 2026) number-one hit on that chart. It also spent five weeks atop the Adult Contemporary chart, her sixth number one on that tally. The song experienced success internationally, reaching number one in many countries. The song sold more than 2.5 million copies up to December 1981 according to Billboard. In 2023, American Songwriter and The Guardian ranked the song number one and number seven, respectively, on their lists of the greatest Barbra Streisand songs.

== Music video ==
The music video for the song included clips from A Star Is Born, starring Streisand and Kris Kristofferson, and from other movies she made in the 1970s.

== Track listing ==
Side	Title	Length
A	"Woman in Love"	3:48
B	"Run Wild"	4:05

== Personnel ==
- Barbra Streisand – lead vocals
- Barry Gibb – acoustic guitar, horn and string arrangements
- Pete Carr – lead guitar
- Richard Tee – keyboards, electric piano
- Harold Cowart – bass guitar
- Steve Gadd – drums
- Joe Lala – shaker
- Denise Maynelli – background vocals
- Myrna Mathews - background vocals
- Marti McCal – background vocals
- Jerry Peel – French horn

== Charts ==
=== Weekly charts ===
Chart (1980–1981)	Peak position
Argentina (CAPIF)	2
Australia (Kent Music Report)	1
Austria (Ö3 Austria Top 40)	1
Belgium (Ultratop 50 Flanders)	1
Canada Top Singles (RPM)	1
Canada Adult Contemporary (RPM)	1
Finland (Suomen virallinen lista)	1
France (IFOP)	1
Iceland (Vísir)	1
Ireland (IRMA)	1
Italy (Discografia Internazionale)	1
Italy (Musica e dischi)	2
Japan (Oricon)	42
Netherlands (Dutch Top 40)	1
Netherlands (Single Top 100)	1
New Zealand (Recorded Music NZ)	2
Norway (VG-lista)	1
South Africa (Springbok Radio)	1
Spain (AFYVE)	1
Sweden (Sverigetopplistan)	1
Switzerland (Schweizer Hitparade)	1
UK Singles (Official Charts)	1
US Billboard Hot 100	1
US Adult Contemporary (Billboard)	1
US Cash Box Hot 100	1
West Germany (GfK)	1

=== Year-end charts ===
Chart (1980)	Position
Australia (Kent Music Report)	21
Canada Top Singles (RPM)	56
Netherlands (Dutch Top 40)	4
Netherlands (Single Top 100)	1
New Zealand (RIANZ)	35
South Africa (Springbok Radio)	2
Switzerland (Schweizer Hitparade)	12
UK Singles (OCC)	2
US Billboard Hot 100	35
US Cash Box Top 100	9

Chart (1981)	Position
Australia (Kent Music Report)	98
Brazil (Nopem)	4
Canada Top Singles (RPM)	58
West Germany (Media Control)	32

=== All-time charts ===
Chart (1958–2018)	Position
US Billboard Hot 100	189

== Certifications and sales ==
Region	Certification	Certified units/sales
Australia (ARIA)	Gold	35,000^{‡}
France (SNEP)	Platinum	1,000,000^{*}
Germany (BVMI)	Gold	500,000^{^}
Italy (FIMI)	Gold	
Japan	—	60,000
United Kingdom (BPI)	Gold	780,000
United States (RIAA)	Platinum	1,000,000^{^}
^{*} Sales figures based on certification alone.^{^} Shipments figures based on certification alone.^{‡} Sales+streaming figures based on certification alone.

== Liz McClarnon version ==
"Woman in Love"

Single by Liz McClarnon
- A-side: "I Get the Sweetest Feeling"
- Released: February 13, 2006
- Length: 3:35
- Label: All Around the World
- Songwriters: Barry Gibb; Robin Gibb
- Producers: Robin Gibb; Graham Stack

Music video
- "Woman in Love" on YouTube

Atomic Kitten member Liz McClarnon covered "Woman in Love" after the group's split in 2005. Produced by original songwriter Robin Gibb—whom McClarnon accompanied on his 2005 tour—the cover was released in February 2006 as McClarnon's debut solo single. In the United Kingdom, the song was released as a double A-side with a cover of Jackie Wilson's 1968 hit "I Get the Sweetest Feeling".

The double A-side peaked at number five on the UK Singles Chart on February 19, 2006, staying in the top 100 for six weeks. Elsewhere, "Woman in Love" reached number 21 in Ireland and became a minor hit in Australia, Belgium, and the Netherlands. McClarnon would go on to record another song entitled "Lately", but the track was not released as a single.

=== Track listings ===
UK CD single

1. "Woman in Love"
2. "I Get the Sweetest Feeling"

Scandinavian CD single

1. "Woman in Love" (radio edit)
2. "Woman in Love" (Dancing DJs remix)
3. "Woman in Love" (K-Klub remix)
4. "Woman in Love" (Soul Seekerz dub)

Australian and New Zealand maxi-single

1. "Woman in Love" (radio edit)
2. "Woman in Love" (K-Klass Klub remix)
3. "Woman in Love" (Soul Seekerz dub)
4. "Woman in Love" (Dancing DJs remix)

=== Charts ===
Chart (2006)	Peak position
Australia (ARIA)	77
Belgium (Ultratip Bubbling Under Flanders)	2
Belgium (Ultratip Bubbling Under Wallonia)	9
Europe (Eurochart Hot 100) with "I Get the Sweetest Feeling"	20
Ireland (IRMA)	21
Netherlands (Single Top 100)	77
Scottish Singles Sales (Official Charts) with "I Get the Sweetest Feeling"	2
UK Singles (Official Charts) with "I Get the Sweetest Feeling"	5

=== Release history ===
Region	Date	Format(s)	Label(s)	Ref.
United Kingdom	February 13, 2006	CD	All Around the World	
Australia	April 17, 2006	CD	All Around the World	

== Barry Gibb version ==
"Woman in Love"

Song by Barry Gibb

from the album The Guilty Demos
- Released: November 2006
- Studio: Criteria (Miami, Florida)
- Length: 3:53
- Label: iTunes
- Songwriters: Barry & Robin Gibb
- Producer: Barry Gibb

In 1979, demo versions of the tracks proposed for inclusion on Guilty were recorded for Streisand, with Barry Gibb on vocals. These versions, including "Woman in Love", were released on iTunes in 2006 as The Guilty Demos.

=== Personnel ===
- Barry Gibb – vocals, guitar
- Blue Weaver – keyboard
- Albhy Galuten – synthesizer, drum machine

== See also ==
- List of best-selling singles in France
- List of best-selling singles of the 1980s in the United Kingdom
- List of Top 25 singles for 1980 in Australia
- List of number-one singles in Australia during the 1980s
- List of RPM number-one singles of 1980
- List of Dutch Top 40 number-one singles of 1980
- List of European number-one hits of 1980
- List of number-one hits of 1980 (France)
- List of number-one hits of 1980 (Germany)
- List of number-one singles of 1980 (Ireland)
- List of number-one hits in Norway
- List of number-one hits (Sweden)
- List of number-one hits of 1980 (Switzerland)
- List of number-one singles from the 1980s (UK)
- List of Hot 100 number-one singles of 1980 (U.S.)
- List of number-one adult contemporary singles of 1980 (U.S.)
