= Casablanca Records =

American recording label

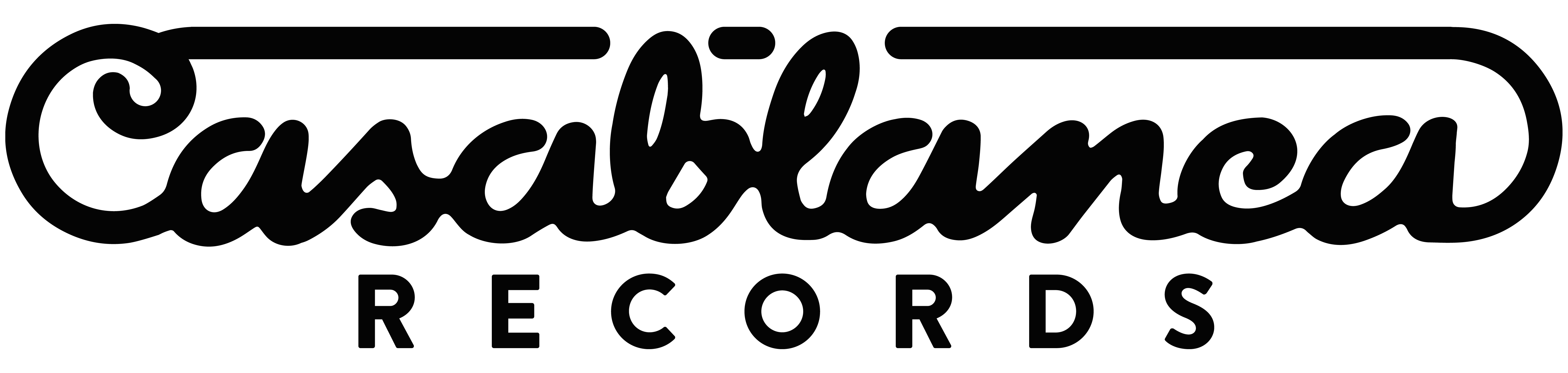
- Current logo
- Parent company: Universal Music Group
- Founded: June 19, 1973; 53 years ago
- Founder: Neil Bogart; Larry Harris; Cecil Holmes; Buck Reingold
- Distributors: Republic Records (since 2012); Mercury Records (1977–2012; in the US); MCA (France); Universal Music Group (International)
- Genre: Dance; electronic
- Country of origin: United States
- Location: New York City, New York, U.S.
- Official website: casablancarecords.com

Casablanca Records is an American record label owned by Universal Music Group and operated under Republic Records. Under its founder Neil Bogart, Casablanca was most successful during the disco era of the mid to late 1970s. The label focuses on dance and electronic music under the direction of Brett Alperowitz.

== History ==
Neil Bogart (originally Bogatz until adopting the name of his favorite actor Humphrey Bogart) founded Casablanca Records after departing Buddah Records due to clashes with its owners. In 1973 Bogart enticed Warner Bros. Records into financing Casablanca. Due to Warner's ownership of all rights to the film Casablanca, Bogart's adoption of the movie's name and title look for its records label logo went without legal objection. The label's first signing was Kiss but its first single release was Bill Amesbury's "Virginia (Touch Me Like You Do)", a minor hit on the US Hot 100. "Butter Boy" by Fanny and The Hudson Brothers' "So You Are a Star" proved to be Casablanca's first Billboard Top 40 hits.

Warner Bros. developed doubts about Casablanca's viability, in particular with the signing of Kiss. Bogart's brashness also did not help relations or gain much support for his acts and releases which had only modest success. Warner head Mo Ostin ceded Bogart full ownership of the label.

The now-independent Casablanca Records was suddenly put in a tenuous financial situation as it still had yet to score a major hit album and no longer had the backing of Warner Bros. Casablanca was banking on the success of an upcoming album it was planning: a two-record set of audio highlights from television's The Tonight Show Starring Johnny Carson. The album was entitled Here's Johnny: Magic Moments from The Tonight Show and was released in November 1974. Although the album was certified gold by the RIAA for shipments to stores of over 500,000 copies, the album did not sell well, and returns from retailers of unsold copies were high. Even the promotional copies were returned, initiating the joke that it shipped gold and went back to the label platinum. Casablanca had realized that even though The Tonight Show Starring Johnny Carson was immensely popular, the show did not carry over well to recordings.

By mid-1975, Casablanca was almost bankrupt, and desperately needed a commercial breakthrough if they were to survive. That breakthrough came in an unlikely form: a double live album, Alive! (1975). It became both Casablanca's and Kiss's first top ten album.

Casablanca eventually became one of the most successful American labels of the 1970s, signing and releasing records by such acts as Kiss, Donna Summer, Village People, Cher, Lipps Inc. (with lead vocalist Cynthia Johnson), and George Clinton's Parliament. In 1976, the label merged with indie-film company Filmworks, Inc., headed by founder Peter Guber, to form Casablanca Record and FilmWorks, Inc., which had hits with the movies The Deep and Midnight Express.

In 1977, PolyGram acquired a 50% stake in Casablanca for $15 million, followed by purchasing the other half in 1980. Also that year, one of the label's biggest acts, Donna Summer, departed to Geffen Records as she and Casablanca failed to agree on her musical direction for the future. That same year, PolyGram pushed Bogart out of Casablanca due to what it viewed as the label's overspending and accounting irregularities. The film division was separated from the label and renamed PolyGram Pictures. In the early 1980s, with Bogart no longer heading the label, Casablanca had hits with acts Lipps Inc., Stephanie Mills, Cameo (on sister label Chocolate City Records), The Four Tops, Mac Davis and Irene Cara but it did not achieve the same level of success it had enjoyed in the 1970s. The label was eventually shut down by PolyGram with some of the artist roster and catalog absorbed into sister label, Mercury Records.

In 1999, PolyGram (including its subsidiaries) was purchased by Seagram and then merged with Seagram's MCA Music Entertainment Group to form the Universal Music Group. In 2000, the Casablanca Records name was revived for a joint venture between Universal Music Group and Tommy Mottola. In a Billboard article, Mottola said that he chose the name as a homage to the original label but that there was no connection between the old and new labels. Casablanca is currently a dance and electronic label under Republic Records headed by GM, Brett Alperowitz, who on April 13, 2021, was also named EVP of A&R by Republic Records' president of West Coast creative, Wendy Goldstein.

== Other events ==
Casablanca started a subsidiary label in 1975 called Chocolate City Records. It was mainly overseen by Bogart's partner Cecil Holmes. The label focused on R&B, funk, and disco releases. Chocolate City's signings included the then-new act Cameo and veteran act Brenda & the Tabulations.

From 1976 to 1979, Casablanca also had another subsidiary label called Parachute Records. The label was run by former Motown Records promoter and Uni Records CEO Russ Regan. Artists signed to the label included singer Randy Brown, the heavily sampled disco group 7th Wonder, and songwriter-author-poet Shel Silverstein, who recorded one album for the label—1978's Songs and Stories.

The offices of Casablanca moved into the former A&M Records offices on Sunset Boulevard in Los Angeles. Casablanca's new offices were soon remodeled after the movie set of the film of the same name. Later, the record company merged with an indie production company called Filmworks, Inc., which was founded by former Columbia Pictures executive Peter Guber. The new company became known as Casablanca Record and Filmworks, with Bogart still at its helm as president, while Guber became chairman of the board and head of its film division. Guber would remain with the company for two years. In 1977, PolyGram acquired a 50% stake in the independent Casablanca, which had been quite successful for several years.

Casablanca remained very successful throughout the rest of the 1970s. But the label's rise and fall would both be dramatic instances. The rise came with the success of several acts such as Donna Summer, Kiss, Parliament, and Village People, as well as some success from its subsidiary label and its film division. The fall began when the 1980s rolled in. The label was known to spend lavish amounts of money on parties, events, and promotion. Although this resulted in hit albums and singles, the profit margin suffered due to the carefree spending by the label. Casablanca spent lavish amounts of money on promoting its releases, which made its artists happy, but not necessarily PolyGram, which now owned a 50% stake in the label. When Casablanca's lavish spending habits were realized by PolyGram, it quickly made an offer to purchase the other 50% of Casablanca in 1980. Bogart accepted; however, he soon found out he would not be allowed to stay with Casablanca, and PolyGram released him from his post. He used the money he acquired from the sale to start Boardwalk Records and he signed then-new rocker Joan Jett, who had experienced some success in Japan as a member of the group The Runaways. Bogart died from cancer in 1982 and Boardwalk Records folded.

== Post-Bogart years ==
Casablanca was not as successful without Bogart running the company. Its only notable releases from 1980 onward were the Robin Williams debut comedy LP Reality, What A Concept! (1981), the soundtrack to the movie Flashdance (1983), and the final three Kiss LP's on Casablanca: Unmasked, Music from "The Elder", and Creatures of the Night. Dusty Springfield's sole release on Casablanca, 1982's White Heat, came and went with little notice due to the label's mounting internal problems. The most successful act on the label during the 1980s was R&B singer Stephanie Mills, who came to the label after PolyGram bought the 20th Century Fox Records label and absorbed its artists and back catalog into Casablanca. The last album released by the label was Animotion's Strange Behavior in 1986, which was a modest seller. By that time, PolyGram had folded Casablanca Records, moving some of its acts to Mercury Records and dropping others.

== 2000 relaunch ==
In 1998, Seagram purchased PolyGram and merged it with MCA Inc. to create the Universal Music Group. Upon the merger, the original (pre-2000) Casablanca Records music catalog became a part of The Island Def Jam Music Group, which folded in 2014. Reissues from the catalog became the responsibility of Island Records.

In 2000, Universal and Tommy Mottola, who had served as CEO of Sony Music Entertainment and Columbia Records throughout the 1990s, partnered to launch a new record label that would be headed by Mottola and be part of the Universal Records Group. Mottola chose the name Casablanca, in homage to the Casablanca Records once run by Bogart. The label's first release was to be a girl-group first known as "iNK", but which later changed its name to "NSS (Not So Sweet) 16". The group, however, disbanded due to internal problems. NSS16's only single OopDeeWopDee was produced by hit music producer and Grammy award winner Greg Lawson and directed by Hakeem Khaaliq.

Some of Casablanca's releases included albums by Lindsay Lohan in 2004, albums by Lohan and Brie Larson in 2005, and music by Mika in 2007, who scored a hit with the song "Relax, Take It Easy". Mottola's label once again become inactive when Lohan and Larson moved to other labels within the Universal family.

In the fall of 2009, Casablanca became active again (albeit in name only) with the releases of Mika's second album, The Boy Who Knew Too Much, and Ryan Leslie's second album, Transition.

== Official book ==
In 2009, Casablanca co-founder Larry Harris released an insider's history, written with Curt Gooch, of the label with a book entitled And Party Every Day: The Inside Story of Casablanca Records.

=== Releases ===
- Shall We Dance? Soundtrack – 2004
- Speak – Lindsay Lohan – 2004
- Pride & Prejudice Soundtrack- 2004
- Finally Out of P.E. – Brie Larson- 2005
- A Little More Personal (Raw) – Lindsay Lohan – 2005
- Life in Cartoon Motion – Mika – 2007
- Ryan Leslie – Ryan Leslie – 2009
- The Boy Who Knew Too Much – Mika – 2009
- Transition – Ryan Leslie – 2009

== 2012 relaunch ==
In January 2012, Casablanca Records was relaunched as an electronic music imprint under Republic Records, as a reflection to the original label. Working with an international roster of both established and emerging artists, Casablanca has released music from Crystal Castles, C2C, Kavinsky, The Presets, Scissor Sisters, Chase & Status, Totally Enormous Extinct Dinosaurs, Ladyhawke, Elton John vs. Pnau and Kindness, Sub Focus, The Aston Shuffle, Martin Garrix, Avicii, Seven Lions, and Dawin.

=== Artist list ===
Artists signed with Casablanca Records are:

- Alma
- Autograf
- Autumn! (With Victor Victor Worldwide)
- Black Caviar
- BLU J
- Bülow
- C2C
- Chase & Status
- Clayjay
- Fais
- Felix Jaehn
- Frankie Grande
- Giorgio Moroder
- Hayden James
- Hearts & Colors
- Jay Pryor
- Justice Skolnik
- Kavinsky
- Keljet
- King Arthur
- Kungs
- Libertines
- Lindsay Lohan
- L'Tric
- M-22
- Madeon
- Marshmello
- Martin Solveig
- Matstubs
- Medasin
- Merk & Kremont
- Mickey Kojak
- MIKA
- Myke Towers
- Møme
- Nelly Furtado
- Nicole Millar
- Phantoms
- Ramzoid
- Riton
- Sachi
- SG Lewis
- Sonny Alven
- Sophie Ellis-Bextor
- Serebro
- Stromae
- Sub Focus
- The Avener
- The Presets
- TheFatRat
- Thomas Azier
- Tiësto
- Vigiland
- Wingtip
- Wolfgang Gartner

=== Past Casablanca artists ===
- 7th Wonder
- Alec R. Costandinos (1977–1978)
- Angel (1975–1980)
- Animotion (1986)
- Bill Amesbury
- Brie Larson (2004–2006)
- Brooklyn Dreams (1977–1980)
- Buddy Miles (1975–1980)
- Cindy Bullens (1979)
- Cameo (1977–1982)
- Captain & Tennille (1979–1980)
- Cher (1979–1981)
- Coney Hatch Debut album 1982 (Japan only)
- Simon Harris (1988)
- D.C. LaRue (1979–1981)
- Dr. Hook (1980–1982)
- David London
- Dennis Parker (Wade Nichols) (1979)
- Donna Summer (1975–1980)
- Dusty Springfield (1982)
- Edmund Sylvers
- Fanny (1974)
- Gazzo (2011–2014)
- Gloria Scott
- Harvey Scales
- Hudson Brothers (1974)
- Irene Cara
- Kickin'
- Kiss (1973–1982)
- Larry Santos
- Lipps Inc (1980–1983)
- Liquid Gold
- Love & Kisses
- Mac Davis (1980–1982)
- Mantra (1981)
- Meco (1981)
- Michael Sembello
- Paul Jabara (1977–1979)
- Patrick Juvet (1978)
- Parlet
- Parliament
- Pattie Brooks
- Peter Criss (1980–1982)
- Peter Noone
- Platypus
- Player (1980)
- Rare Gems Odyssey (1977–1980)
- Roberta Kelly (1976–1978)
- Robin Williams (1979)
- Rodney Dangerfield
- Santa Esmeralda
- Scissor Sisters
- Skatt Brothers (1979–1980)
- Smoke aka Blacksmoke (1976)
- Space
- Stallion
- Stephanie Mills (1983–1984)
- Sunshine (1978)
- T. Rex (1974)
- Teri DeSario (1978–1980)
- The Four Tops (1981–1982)
- The Godz (1978)
- People's Choice (1980)
- The Ritchie Family
- The Sylvers (1978–1979)
- Tony Joe White (1980)
- Tony Orlando (1979–1982)
- Trigger (1978)
- Village People (1977–1980)

== Notable artists ==
=== Kiss ===
Kiss was the first band to sign to Casablanca. The label had released three albums by Kiss: Kiss (1974), Hotter Than Hell (1974), and Dressed to Kill (1975), but all had failed to make a big impact on the charts. The label also did not experience heavy sales with albums by Angel, who was introduced to the label by Gene Simmons of Kiss, although that glam rock band did amass a cult following. Casablanca was on the verge of bankruptcy when Bogart decided to release a live album by Kiss. Although the band's studio albums had not been strong sellers, the band had a reputation for performing exciting live shows. Casablanca decided to try to capitalize on that reputation by releasing the double-live Alive! (1975) album. It became both Casablanca's and Kiss's first top ten album and was certified gold. Kiss's follow-up studio albums to Alive! were better sellers than previous studio albums. Destroyer (1976), Rock and Roll Over (1976), and Love Gun (1977) were all certified platinum in the United States. Other successful late 1970s Kiss albums on Casablanca were Alive II (1977), Double Platinum (1978), the band's four solo albums (1978) and Dynasty (1979). Their less successful early 1980s works here were Unmasked (1980) and Music from "The Elder" (1981). The band's last studio album on Casablanca was Creatures of the Night in 1982.

=== Cher ===
Cher recorded two solo albums for Casablanca, Take Me Home and Prisoner (both 1979). Both records were hits, especially in Europe. The former album peaked at number 25 on the Billboard 200, and main single "Take Me Home" peaked at number eight on the Billboard Hot 100, making it Cher's first US top-ten single since 1974's "Dark Lady". Although both albums sold well, they were not well-received critically. The album Take Me Home received Gold certification in the US and is considered one of Cher's best albums, as it was her first Disco record.

To promote the album, Cher recorded a music video for "Take Me Home" which was used as part of an exclusive TV special called Cher... and Other Fantasies. She also performed "Take Me Home" along with other two album tracks "Love & Pain" and "Happy Was the Day We Met" on The Mike Douglas Show. In 1979, Cher embarked on her first solo tour, the Take Me Home Tour, which was highly successful with two dates of the show recorded for broadcast, in Monte Carlo and at Caesars Palace in Las Vegas. For the latter performance, Cher was awarded "Best Actress in a Variety Program" at the 1983 CableACE Awards.

=== Parliament ===
Parliament was signed to Casablanca in 1973 due to Bogart's long-standing relationship with group leader George Clinton. Their relationship dated to Bogart's period at Buddah Records. Their first release for the label was in 1974 with the album Up for the Down Stroke. The title song from the album gave Parliament its first top ten R&B hit. Their next album, Chocolate City, sold approximately 150,000 albums in the Washington, D.C. area alone. But it was their next release, Mothership Connection, that gave the group its first gold and platinum album. Parliament achieved either gold or platinum status with each album release from 1975 to 1979. The group's hit singles included "Give Up the Funk (Tear the Roof off the Sucker)", "Flash Light" (Casablanca's first R&B number one hit) and "Aqua Boogie (A Psychoalphadiscobetabioaquadoloop)". The success of Parliament allowed George Clinton to develop another P-Funk spin-off act known as Parlet. Casablanca bankrolled the extravagant P-Funk stage shows, including the "Mothership Connection/P-Funk Earth Tour" of 1976–77 and the Motor Booty Affair underwater tour of 1979. Parliament and its sister band Funkadelic was inducted into the Rock and Roll Hall of Fame.

=== Donna Summer ===
In 1975, Casablanca signed Donna Summer and released her album Love to Love You Baby which was certified gold. Summer had several gold and platinum albums on Casablanca in 1975–1979 and was the label's most successful act on the singles chart. She recorded eight Top 5 singles in a 19-month period. Summer had 10 gold singles, 2 platinum singles and a gold maxi-single with Casablanca. Summer was called in the American press "The First Lady of Love", a name that she disliked but that Casablanca marketed with great success. She was also called "The Queen of Disco". Her hits included the number ones "MacArthur Park", "No More Tears (Enough Is Enough)" duet with Barbra Streisand, the Grammy-winning "Bad Girls", the Oscar, Golden Globe and Grammy-winning "Last Dance", the Grammy-winning number one "Hot Stuff", and the hit single, "I Feel Love", co-written and produced by Giorgio Moroder. Her album Bad Girls achieved triple-platinum status. The label followed it with a greatest hits collection entitled On the Radio: Greatest Hits Volumes I & II, which was certified double platinum and was Summer's last album on Casablanca. She recorded three double-albums that reached the top of the charts in a 14-month period.

=== Village People ===
Village People is an American disco group best known for their on-stage costumes and suggestive lyrics. The group was originally formed by French producers Jacques Morali, Henri Belolo and lead singer Victor Willis following the release of the 1977 debut album, Village People, which targeted disco's gay audience. The group's name refers to New York City's Greenwich Village, at the time known for its large gay population, The characters were a symbolic group of gay and macho fantasy personas. The group quickly became popular and moved into the mainstream, scoring several disco and dance hits internationally under the label, including the hit singles "Macho Man", "In the Navy", "Go West" and their biggest hit, "Y.M.C.A."

=== Lipps, Inc. ===
In 1979, Lipps Inc., with Steven Greenberg as writer, producer, and musician, and Cynthia Johnson on lead vocals, signed with Casablanca. The single "Rock It" was released, followed by the album Mouth to Mouth. The album included the No. 1 hit "Funkytown", which spent four weeks atop both the Billboard Hot 100 and the Hot Dance Music/Club Play charts in the United States. The 7" single sold over two million copies within a few months and was awarded a platinum record within the same year of its release. It reached No. 2 in the United Kingdom and was a hit throughout the world.

=== Lindsay Lohan ===
Lindsay Lohan signed on to the label in 2004, under the management of Tommy Mottola. She released her debut studio album, Speak in December 2004, peaking at number 4 on the Billboard 200 and eventually earning Platinum certification. Speak spawned Lohan's first single, "Rumors". Detailing Lohan's complaints with the paparazzi, "Rumors" eventually earned gold certification, as well as a nomination for Best Pop Video at the 2005 MTV Video Music Awards. Lohan released her second album, A Little More Personal (Raw) in December 2005. The album peaked at number 20 on the Billboard 200, gaining gold certification in early 2006. The first and only single from the album, "Confessions of a Broken Heart (Daughter to Father)", peaked at number 57 on the Billboard Hot 100, making it Lohan's first single to debut on the chart. The song documents the problems Lohan has had in her family life, and the music video, which Lohan herself directed, features her younger sister Aliana.

=== Mika ===
Mika's debut single, "Relax, Take It Easy", was released in 2006. His second single, "Grace Kelly", was released in January 2007 and debuted at number one on the UK Singles Chart, followed by his debut album, Life in Cartoon Motion, in February 2007. The single reached number 57 in the US. Other singles released were "Love Today", "Big Girl (You Are Beautiful)", "Happy Ending" and "Lollipop". Mika's second album, The Boy Who Knew Too Much, followed in September 2009. The first single from the album, "We Are Golden", made its debut at number four in the UK. "Rain" and "Blame It on the Girls" were released as the second and third UK singles with both peaking at number seventy-two. His third studio album, The Origin of Love, was released in France on September 17, 2012, and in the United Kingdom on October 8, 2012. The album was preceded by an alternate lead single in each region. "Elle me dit" was first released in France, whereas "Celebrate" served as the first official single for the United Kingdom.

=== Tiësto ===
Tiësto's fifth studio album A Town Called Paradise was released on June 13, 2014. "Red Lights" was released as the lead single from the album on December 13, 2013. It was his first number one in Scotland, and peaked at number 6 on the UK Singles Chart. The song reached the top 10 in Australia, Denmark, Norway and Sweden. "Wasted" was released as the second single from the album on April 25, 2014. The song peaked at number 3 on the UK Singles Chart, and reached the top 10 in Sweden. "Light Years Away" was released as the album's third single on November 28, 2014.

=== Kungs ===
Kungs released his first extended play This Girl in 2016 following his remix of Cookin' on 3 Burners "This Girl", which reached number 1 in France, Germany and Switzerland and number 2 on the UK Singles Chart in 2016. He has since released the single "Don't You Know" featuring Jamie N Commons and "I Feel So Bad" featuring Ephemerals. Kungs' three 2016 singles were released on his debut album Layers, which was released on 4 November. On March 23, 2018, Kungs played a live set at the Miami Ultra Music Festival. He followed acts from fellow artists Raiden and Ksuke to perform his individual set on the 2018 Ultra Main Stage.

=== Martin Solveig ===
Martin Picandet (French pronunciation: [maʁtɛ̃ pikɑ̃dɛ]; born September 22, 1976), better known by his stage name Martin Solveig, is a French DJ, singer, songwriter and record producer. He hosts a weekly radio show called C'est La Vie on radio stations worldwide, including Radio FG in his homeland. His label is called Mixture Stereophonic. Solveig had been ranked number 29 in the 2011 DJ Mag. He has collaborated with Dragonette, Kele of Bloc Party, and Madonna.

=== SG Lewis ===
SG Lewis is a British producer, songwriter, and DJ that makes dance-oriented, electronic-based music. Initially known for his remixes of artists like Jessie Ware, he released his debut EP, Shivers, in 2015. Collaborations with vocalists such as Gallant (singer), Ray BLK, and Bishop Nehru followed, and Lewis released Dusk, the first EP in a three-part series dedicated to club culture, in 2018.
