= Lipps Inc. =

American disco and funk group

Background information
- Origin: Minneapolis, Minnesota, U.S.
- Genres: Disco; funk
- Years active: 1979–1985
- Labels: Casablanca; Phonogram; Polydor; Polyfar; PolyGram; DreamWorks
- Past members: Cynthia Johnson; Steven Greenberg; Margie Cox; Melanie Rosales; Tom Riopelle; Terry Grant; David Rivkin
- Website: funkytown.com

Lipps Inc. (/ˈlɪpsɪŋk/ LIP-sink, a pun on the phrase "lip sync"; sometimes written Lipps, Inc.) was an American disco and funk group from Minneapolis, Minnesota. The group is best known for the chart-topping 1980 worldwide hit single "Funkytown", which hit No. 1 in 28 countries and was certified as double platinum in sales.

The group originally consisted of lead vocalist Cynthia Johnson and a changing line-up of session musicians, including guitarist David Rivkin, guitarist Tom Riopelle and bassist Terry Grant. Steven Greenberg, the creator of the act, wrote and produced most of the group's music.

== History ==
Lipps Inc. started as a project of Steven Greenberg when he was a wedding DJ who wanted to try his hand at writing disco songs. He had intended to use the name Lip Sync, but it was in use by another group, so instead he chose the homophone Lipps Inc. Greenberg was the sole member of the group until he met Cynthia Johnson while auditioning singers for his song "Rock It". Johnson joined the project, and Lipps Inc. became a duo.

Lipps Inc.'s first release was the 1979 single "Rock It" on Greenberg's Flight imprint. The act released its debut album Mouth to Mouth in late 1979.

With the release of the album, "Funkytown" became the second single from Mouth to Mouth and spent four weeks at No. 1 on both the Billboard Hot 100 and Hot Dance Music/Club Play charts in the United States; the previously released “Rock It” was also on the album, with a slightly different mix. The 7" single of "Funkytown" sold more than 2 million copies within a few months, and it was awarded a platinum record within the year of its release. It reached No. 2 in the United Kingdom and was a hit throughout the world.

Lipps Inc.'s later singles failed to match the band's previous success (the only other Hot 100 entry was "Rock It", which peaked at No. 64). However, more dance hits were released during the 1980s, including "How Long" in 1981 (originally a hit for Ace), which reached No. 4 on the U.S. dance chart. After Designer Music, the group's third album, Johnson left the band and was replaced by Margie Cox and Melanie Rosales. Lipps Inc. released 4, its final album, in 1983, and disbanded two years later.

=== Europe ===
The "face" of the group in the Netherlands was the British dancer Doris D (Debbie Jenner), who lip-synced the song in TopPop with her dancers. Due to the success of this performance, they were invited to perform as Lipps Inc. in other European countries, including Germany. Jenner and her dancers then had success as "Doris D & the Pins" in early 1981.

== Awards and recognitions ==
- Platinum and Double-Platinum Status with Funkytown
- Inductee into Minnesota Music Hall of Fame

== Discography ==
=== Studio albums ===
| Title | Year | Peak chart positions | | | | | | | | | Certifications |
| Title | Year | US | US R&B | AUS | AUT | CAN | GER | NLD | NOR | SWE | Certifications |
|---|---|---|---|---|---|---|---|---|---|---|---|
| Mouth to Mouth | 1979 | 5 | 5 | 57 | 7 | 12 | 11 | 23 | 21 | 10 | RIAA: Gold; MC: Gold |
| Pucker Up | 1980 | 63 | 37 | — | — | — | — | — | 40 | 46 | |
| Designer Music | 1981 | — | — | — | — | — | — | — | — | — | |
| 4 | 1983 | — | — | — | — | — | — | — | — | — | |
"—" denotes releases that did not chart or were not released in that territory.

=== Compilation albums ===
| Title | Album details |
|---|---|
| Funkyworld: The Best of Lipps Inc. | Released: 1992; Label: Island Records |
| Funkytown | Released: 2003; Label: Universal Music Enterprises |

=== Singles ===
List of singles with year of release and chart positions
| Title | Year | Peak chart positions | | | | | | | | | | | Certifications |
| Title | Year | US | US Dance | US R&B | AUS | CAN | GER | ITA | NLD | NOR | SWE | UK | Certifications |
|---|---|---|---|---|---|---|---|---|---|---|---|---|---|
| "Rock It" | 1979 | — | — | — | — | — | — | — | — | — | — | — | |
| "Funkytown" | 1980 | 1 | 1 | 2 | 1 | 1 | 1 | 5 | 1 | 1 | 2 | 2 | RIAA: 2× Platinum; BPI: Gold; MC: 2× Platinum |
| "Rock It" | 1980 | 64 | 20 | 85 | — | — | — | — | — | — | — | — | |
| "How Long" | 1980 | — | 4 | 29 | 44 | 42 | 32 | 6 | 30 | — | 16 | — | |
| "Hold Me Down" | 1981 | — | 11 | 70 | — | — | — | — | — | — | — | — | |
| "Addicted to the Night" | 1983 | — | 8 | 78 | — | — | — | — | — | — | — | — | |
| "Does Anybody Know Me"/"Hit the Deck" | 1985 | — | 32 | — | — | — | — | — | — | — | — | — | |
"—" denotes releases that did not chart or were not released in that territory.

== See also ==
- List of artists who reached number one in the United States
- List of artists who reached number one on the U.S. dance chart
