= Pseudo Echo discography =

- Pseudo Echo performing in Rockhampton, Queensland, in August 2026
- Studio albums: 7
- Live albums: 2
- Compilation albums: 5
- Singles: 21

Pseudo Echo are an Australian new wave band formed in 1982, best known for their 1986 single "Funky Town". They released three studio albums before disbanding in 1989. The band reformed in 1998 and have released four further studio albums, and continue to tour Australia. They have released 6 studio albums, 2 live, and 7 compilation albums.

== Albums ==
=== Studio albums ===
Title	Album details	Peak chart positions				Certifications (sales thresholds)
Title	Album details	AUS	NZ	SWE	US	Certifications (sales thresholds)
Autumnal Park	Released: June 1984; Label: EMI (P-430008); Producer: John Punter	11	13	—	—	ARIA: Gold
Love an Adventure	Released: October 1985; Label: EMI (CDP 746257) / RCA (5730); Producer: Mark Berry, Brian Canham	14	—	21	57	ARIA: Platinum; MC: Gold
Race	Released: 1988; Label: EMI (CDP 790983) / RCA (8503); Producer: Brian Canham, Julian Mendelsohn	18	—	—	—	
Ultraviolet	Released: April 2014; Label: Pseudo Echo (9339718113834); Producer: Dominic Messino	165	—	—	—	
Acoustica	Released: 4 May 2020; Label: Pseudo Echo	—	—	—	—	
After Party	Released: 20 September 2020; Label: Pseudo Echo	—	—	—	—	
"—" denotes releases that did not chart or were not released in that country.

=== Live albums ===
Title	Album details
Autumnal Park – Live	Released: 2005; Label: Almacantar/Polymod (AR-4115)
Live at the Viper Room	Released: 6 June 2015; Label: Pseudo Echo

=== Compilation albums ===
Title	Album Details	Peak chart positions	
Title	Album Details	AUS	NZ
Long Plays 83–87	Released: March 1987; Label: EMI (CDP 746949 2)	44	1
Best Adventures	Released: October 1995; Label: EMI (8140762)	—	—
Teleporter	Released: 30 October 2000; Label: Colossal (COLCD1123)	—	—
The 301 Demo Sessions	Released: 2005; Label: Almacantar (AR-7147)	—	—
The Essential	Released: 6 December 2008; Label: EMI	—	—
1990: The Lost Album Demos	Released: 10 June 2021; Label: Pseudo Echo	—	—
Ultimate	Released: 13 April 2022; Label: Pseudo Echo	—	—
"—" denotes releases that did not chart or were not released in that country.

== Singles ==
Title	Year	Peak chart positions										Album
Title	Year	AUS	AUT	BEL	CAN	GER	NZ	SWE	SWI	UK	US	Album
"Listening"	1983	4	—	—	—	—	37	—	—	—	—	Autumnal Park
"A Beat for You"	1984	12	—	—	—	—	6	—	—	—	—	Autumnal Park
"Dancing Until Midnight"	1984	53	—	—	—	—	—	—	—	—	—	Autumnal Park
"Stranger in Me"	1984	58	—	—	—	—	—	—	—	—	—	Autumnal Park
"Don't Go"	1985	4	—	—	—	—	28	—	—	—	—	Love an Adventure
"Love an Adventure"	1986	6	—	—	—	—	50	—	—	—	—	Love an Adventure
"Living in a Dream"	1986	15	—	—	—	—	—	—	—	—	57	Love an Adventure
"Try"	1986	60	—	—	—	—	—	—	—	—	—	Love an Adventure
"Funky Town" (Note: "Funky Town" only appears on reissues and on the US edition of Love an Adventure.)	1986	1	13	30	1	16	1	9	11	8	6	Love an Adventure
"Take On the World" (Note: Japanese-only release.)	1987	—	—	—	—	—	—	—	—	—	—	Race
"Fooled Again"	1988	33	—	—	—	—	—	—	—	—	—	Race
"Over Tomorrow"	1989	40	—	—	—	—	—	—	—	—	—	Race
"Eye of the Storm"	1989	152	—	—	—	—	—	—	—	—	—	Race
"Funkytown Y2K: RMX"	1999	161	—	—	—	—	—	—	—	—	—	Teleporter
"Suddenly Silently"	2012	—	—	—	—	—	—	—	—	—	—	Ultraviolet
"Fighting the Tide"	2012	—	—	—	—	—	—	—	—	—	—	Ultraviolet
"Ultraviolet"	2014	—	—	—	—	—	—	—	—	—	—	Ultraviolet
"Nutbush City Limits"	2017	—	—	—	—	—	—	—	—	—	—	Non-album single
"I'm Alright"	2020	—	—	—	—	—	—	—	—	—	—	After Party
"All of the Above"	2020	—	—	—	—	—	—	—	—	—	—	After Party
"Wedge-Tail"	2020	—	—	—	—	—	—	—	—	—	—	After Party
"—" denotes a recording that did not chart or was not released in that territory.
