= Best Adventures =

Compilation album by Pseudo Echo
- Released: 11 October 1995
- Recorded: 1982–1989
- Genre: Rock, pop, new wave, synthpop
- Label: EMI Records

Pseudo Echo chronology
Race (1988)	Best Adventures (1995)	Teleporter (2000)

Best Adventures is a compilation album by Australian band, Pseudo Echo, released in October 1995, spanning the band's entire career.

== Background ==
Pseudo Echo was established in Melbourne in 1982 by Brian Canham, Pierre Pierre and Tony Lugton. Anthony Argiro joined in 1983. They were the first unsigned band to appear on the TV show Countdown, where they performed their track, "Listening". Following this performance, the band signed a record deal with EMI Australia. The band went on to release three studio albums and accrued 9 gold and platinum awards. The band disbanded in November 1989.

== Track listing ==
No.	Title	Writer(s)	Album	Length
1.	"Listening"	Brian Canham, Tony Lugton	Autumnal Park	2:58
2.	"Fast Cars"	Brian Canham, Pierre Gigliotti	Autumnal Park	4:22
3.	"A Beat for You"	Brian Canham	Autumnal Park	3:41
4.	"Destination Unknown"	Brian Canham, F. Scalzo, Pierre Gigliotti	Autumnal Park	4:57
5.	"Dancing Until Midnight"	Brian Canham, Tony Lugton	Autumnal Park	4:21
6.	"Don’t Go"	Brian Canham	Love An Adventure	3:53
7.	"Lonely Without You"	Brian Canham, James Leigh	Love An Adventure	4:33
8.	"Love an Adventure"	Brian Canham	Love An Adventure	4:14
9.	"Living in a Dream"	Brian Canham	Love An Adventure	3:24
10.	"Try"	Brian Canham, James Leigh	Love An Adventure	4:16
11.	"Funkytown"	Steven Greenberg	Long Plays 83–87	6:32
12.	"Fooled Again"	Vince Leigh, James Leigh	Race	4:39
13.	"Take On the World"	Brian Canham, Vince Leigh	Race	3:46
14.	"Over Tomorrow"	Brian Canham, James Leigh	Race	5:04
