= Teleporter (album) =

Compilation album by Pseudo Echo
- Released: October 2000
- Recorded: 1982–1989
- Genre: New wave, synth pop
- Length: 1:47:26
- Label: Colossal Records
- Producer: Brian Canham

Pseudo Echo chronology
Best Adventures (1995)	Teleporter (2000)	Autumnal Park - Live (2005)

Teleporter is a compilation album by Australian band Pseudo Echo, featuring four new tracks, five remixed tracks, and live performances, released in October 2000.

== Background ==
Pseudo Echo was established in Melbourne in 1982, released 3 studio album and disbanded in November 1989. A 'best of' was released in 1995, titled Best Adventures. The band reformed and toured in 1998, leading the release of Teleporter.

== Review ==
Michael Sutton of All Music reviewed the album, saying "On disc one, Pseudo Echo shows that they can still drink from new romantic waters, diving into early-'80s nostalgia on newer tracks like "Hope I Go to Heaven" and "1985." Although some rave touches creep in, vocalist Brian Canham still knows how to carve sharp hooks." On the live performances on disc two, Sutton says "the band doesn't stray from their formula -- high-styled Euro-disco with deep, heavily accented vocals, beeping synthesizers, and dark riffs." adding "they are beautifully dated artifacts from an exciting time in music."

== Track listing ==
Disc 1 - Teleporter

1. "Hope I Go To Heaven" - 5:43
2. "The Future (Isn't What It Used To Be)" - 4:38
3. "1985" - 4:18
4. "Lesson in Love No.1" - 4:31
5. "Listening" (remixed by Matt Black) - 6:03
6. "In Their Time" (remixed by Darren Glen) - 5:50
7. "Funkytown" (remixed by Sly) - 4:42
8. "Love an Adventure" (remixed by Sly) - 4:50
9. "Funkytown Y2K" (remixed by Smash N Grab) - 3:53

Disc 2 - Live

1. "Stranger in Me" - 4:19
2. "In Their Time" - 5:46
3. "Dancing Until Midnight" - 3:57
4. "Walkaway" - 3:55
5. "A Beat for You" - 3:53
6. "Fast Cars" - 3:41
7. "Destination Unknown" - 4:41
8. "Listening" - 3:18
9. "See Through" - 3:35
10. "Don't Go" - 4:05
11. "Living in a Dream" - 3:44
12. "Love an Adventure" - 4:48
13. "His Eyes" - 4:07
14. "Funky Town" - 9:09
- Disc 2 recorded live in Melbourne

== Personnel ==
- Engineer, Mastered By – Adam Calaitzis
- Recorded By – James "Oysters" Kilpatrick* (tracks: 2-01 to 2-14)
