= Live at the Viper Room =

Live album by Pseudo Echo
- Released: 6 June 2015
- Recorded: 7 February 2015
- Venue: The Viper Room, United States
- Genre: Electronic music, synth-pop, pop
- Label: Brian Canham

Pseudo Echo chronology
Ultraviolet (2014)	Live at the Viper Room (2015)

Live at the Viper Room is a live album by Australian band Pseudo Echo. The album was recorded on 7 February 2015 at The Viper Room, West Hollywood, United States.

The album was released digitally on 6 June 2015.

== Background ==
In 2012, Pseudo Echo gathered for shows to celebrate the 30th anniversary of the release of their first single "Listening". The band recorded a new album using PledgeMusic to finance the album's recording and manufacturing. The Pseudo Echo campaign turned out to be one of the most successful take-ups for Pledgemusic generating 126% of the financial goal and guaranteeing the release of the album. Ultraviolet was released in April 2014.

Brian Canham said “It was an extremely successful campaign and we reached our budget in about two weeks rather than three months. We have some seriously die-hard fans. And once we did that and established that we had a good fan base, we decided to do another one but we weren’t ready to do another album of new stuff, we needed to keep the ball rolling so we decided to do a live album."

Pseudo Echo went back to the fans to help contribute towards the recording of a live album of the project via PledgeMusic.com once again.

== Reception ==
88.3 Southern FM said; "The ‘Pseuds’ have released one of the best albums this year, Live at the Viper Room. The band has been captured at their best on this set." The station played it in its entirety with chat and stories in between.

== Track listing ==
1. "Ultraviolet" (Brian Canham) – 5:17
2. "His Eyes" (Canham, Tony Lugton) – 4:14
3. "Stranger in Me" (Canham) – 4:24
4. "A Beat for You" (Canham) – 4:05
5. "Dancing Until Midnight" (B. Canham, Tony Lugton) – 4:26
6. "Fighting the Tide" (Canham) – 3:47
7. "Fast Cars" (Canham, Pierre Gigliotti) – 3:51
8. "Destination Unknown" (Canham, F. Scalzo, Gigliotti) – 4:52
9. "Living in a Dream" (Canham) – 3:36
10. "Listening" (Canham, Tony Lugton) – 3:19
11. "Love an Adventure" (Canham) – 4:24
12. "Funky Town" (Steve Greenburg) – 8:25

== Personnel ==
- Brian Canham – Vocals, Bass Guitar, Guitar, Keyboards, Keyboard Bass
- Darren Danielson – Drums
- Ben Grayson – Keyboards
- Simon Rayner – Backing Vocals, Keyboard Bass
