= Long Plays 83–87 =

Compilation album by Pseudo Echo
- Released: March 1987
- Recorded: 1983–1987
- Genres: Dance, dance-pop, synthpop
- Length: 49:50 (Long Plays 83-87)
- Label: EMI Australia

Pseudo Echo chronology
Love An Adventure (1985)	Long Plays 83–87 (1987)	Race (1988)

Funky Town - The Album
- New Zealand version

Long Plays 83–87 is the first compilation album released by Australian new wave band, Pseudo Echo. It was released in 1987. It included extended and dance versions of their previously released singles between 1983 and 1987. It was released on CD in 1990.

It was released in New Zealand under the title FunkyTown - The album.

== Reviews ==
Michael Sutton of Allmusic gave the album 4 out of 5 stars, saying: This compilation shows that in the '80s Pseudo Echo was able to combine dance music and rock & roll as deftly as its Australian peers in INXS. Singer Brian Canham may not have had the snake-like charm of INXS' Michael Hutchence, but his brooding voice makes these songs sound more mysterious than they normally would. The lyrics are often superficial and repetitive; however, the hooks are dynamite. Pseudo Echo just wanted to get bodies gyrating, and Long Plays 83-87 offers the perfect way to get into the groove.

== Track listings ==
Australian 'Long Plays 83–87'

Side A
No.	Title	Writer(s)	Length
1.	"Listening"	Brian Canham / Tony Lugton	5:35
2.	"A Beat for You"	Brian Canham	7:26
3.	"Stranger in Me"	Brian Canham	6:04
4.	"Don't Go"	Brian Canham / James Leigh	6:40

Side two
No.	Title	Writer(s)	Length
1.	"Love an Adventure"	Brian Canham	6:21
2.	"Living in a Dream"	Brian Canham	5:39
3.	"Destination Unknown"	Brian Canham / Pierre Gigliotti / Frank Scalzo	5:48
4.	"Funkytown"	Steven Greenberg	6:35

New Zealand 'Funky Town'

Side A
No.	Title	Writer(s)	Length
1.	"Funkytown (Dance Mix) "	Steven Greenberg	6:35
2.	"Don't Go (Extended Mix) "	Brian Canham / James Leigh	6:40
3.	"Love An Adventure (Extended Mix) "	Brian Canham	6:21

Side two
No.	Title	Writer(s)	Length
1.	"A Beat For You (Extended Mix) "	Brian Canham	7:26
2.	"Listening (Extended Mix) "	Brian Canham / Tony Lugton	5:35
3.	"Living In A Dream (Metal Mix) "	Brian Canham	5:39

== Charts ==
Long Plays 83-87 peaked at No.44 in Australia; however, Funky Town - The Album was much more successful in New Zealand, where it debuted at No.4 and peaked at No.1. It remained at No.1 for 3 consecutive weeks during April 1987.

=== Weekly charts ===
Chart (1987)	Peak position
Australian Kent Music Report Albums Chart	44
New Zealand RIANZ Albums Chart	1

== Credits ==
- Brian Canham
- Pierre Pierre
- James Leigh
- Vince Leigh
- Tony Lugton
- Anthony Argiro

== See also ==
List of number-one albums from the 1980s (New Zealand)
