= Fooled Again =

"Fooled Again" may refer to:

- "Fooled Again", a 1988 single by Pseudo Echo.
- "Fooled Again (I Don't Like It)", a 1976 song by Tom Petty and the Heartbreakers from their debut album.
- Fooled Again, How the Right Stole the 2004 Elections, a book on election fraud in the United States by Mark Crispin Miller
- "Won't Get Fooled Again", a rock anthem by the rock band The Who
