= List of number 1 albums from the 1980s (New Zealand) =

This is the Recorded Music NZ list of number 1 albums in New Zealand during the 1980s decade. Dire Straits' 1985 album Brothers in Arms spent a total of 21 weeks at No. 1. Split Enz's album Time and Tide was the most successful album by a New Zealand artist, spending a total of six weeks at No. 1. From September 1983 to August 1989, no albums by New Zealand artists reached No. 1.

In New Zealand, Recorded Music NZ compiles the top 40 albums chart each Monday. Over-the-counter sales of both physical and digital formats make up the data. Certifications are awarded for the number of shipments to retailers. Gold certifications are awarded after 7,500 sales, and platinum certifications after 15,000.

The following albums were all number 1 in New Zealand in the 1980s.

== Chart-topping albums ==
Key
* – Number-one album of the year (Note: Annual charts are sourced from the RMNZ website.)
† – Album of New Zealand origin (Note: Whether or not a song is of New Zealand origin is determined by RMNZ)
‡ – Number-one album of the year, of New Zealand origin

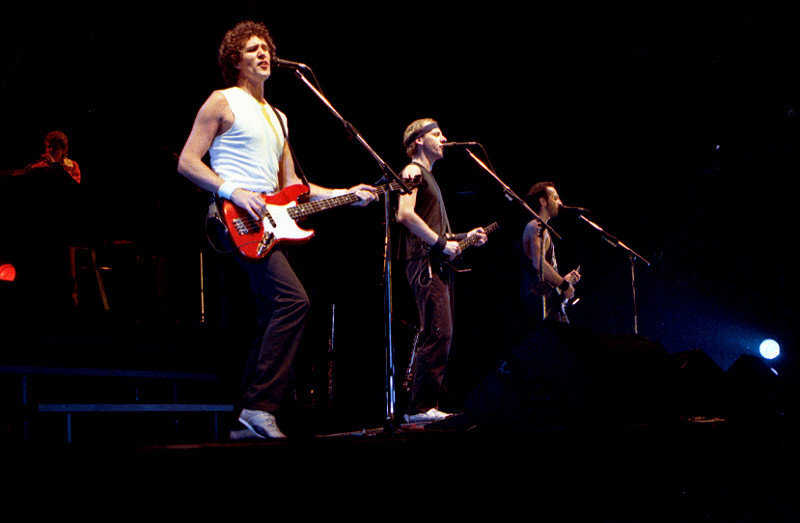
Dire Straits spent a total of twenty-one weeks at number 1 with their album Brothers in Arms.

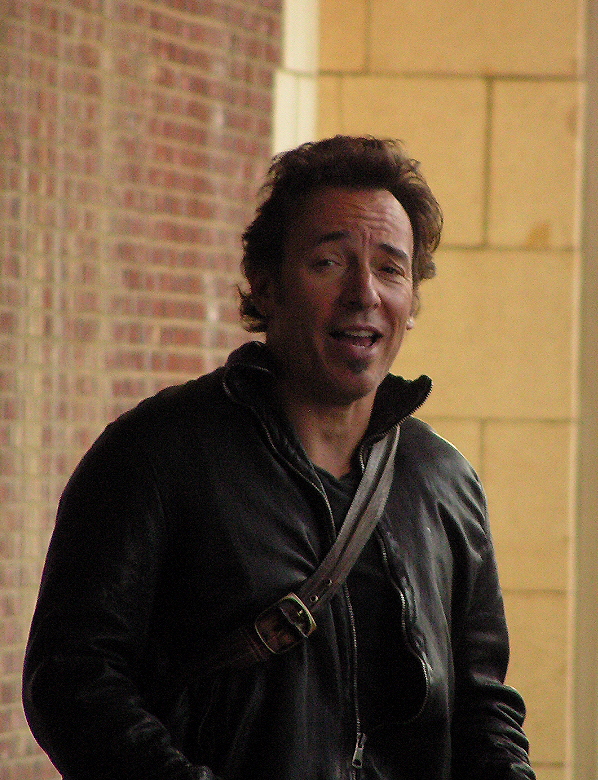
Bruce Springsteen's 1984 album Born in the USA spent 15 weeks at No. 1.

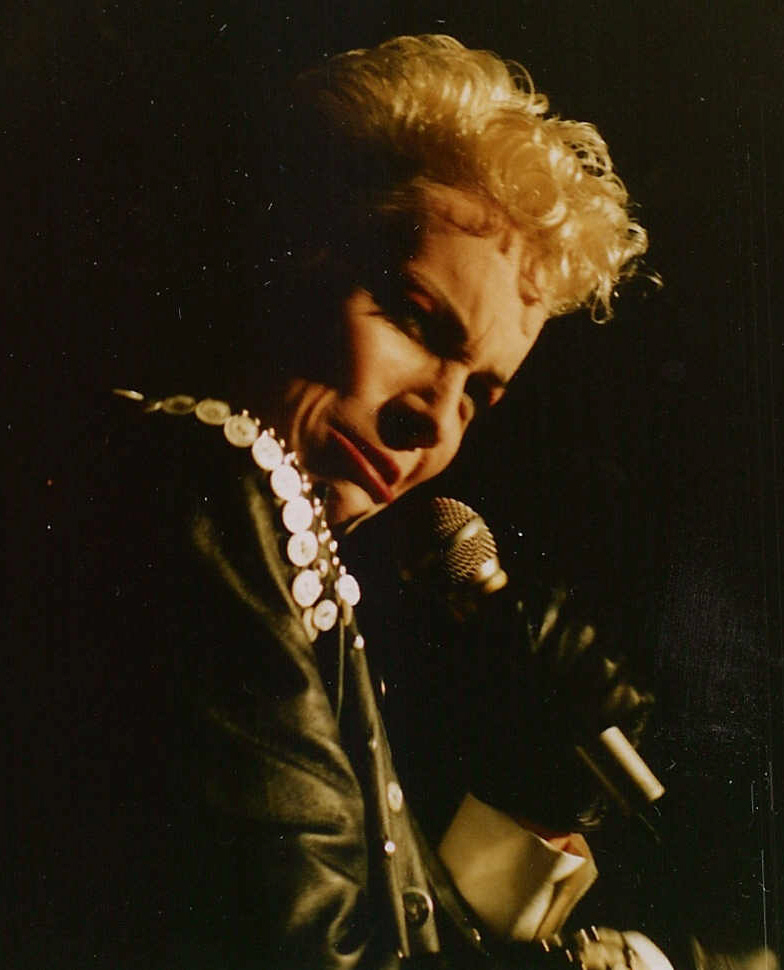
Eurythmics spent 10 weeks straight at No. 1 with their album Revenge.

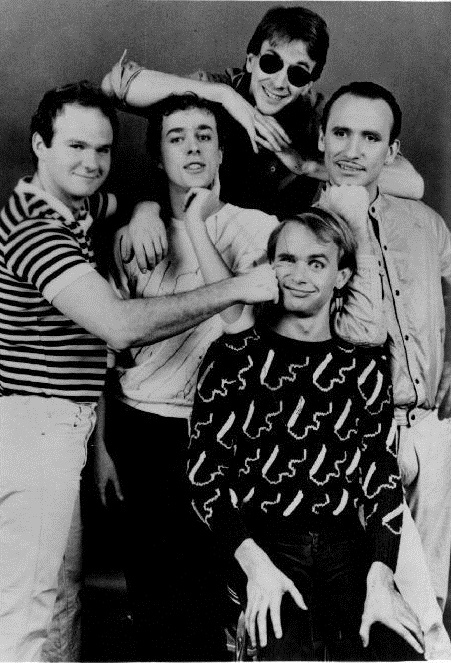
Australian band Men at Work spent 10 weeks at No. 1 with their album business as usual.

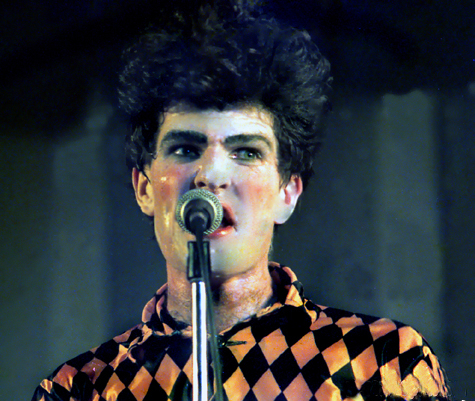
Split Enz was the most successful New Zealand band of the decade. They had four albums reach number 1, spending a total of 13 weeks at number 1.

Artist	Album	Weeks at number 1	Reached number 1
Summer break - no chart (2 weeks)
Pink Floyd	The Wall	6	20 January 1980
Split Enz	True Colours^{‡}	2	2 March 1980
Pink Floyd	The Wall	3	16 March 1980
Fleetwood Mac	Tusk	1	6 April 1980
Easter holiday - no chart (1 week)
Gheorghe Zamfir & Harry van Hoof	Music by Candlelight	3	20 April 1980
Tom Petty and the Heartbreakers	Damn the Torpedoes	1	11 May 1980
Gheorghe Zamfir & Harry van Hoof	Music by Candlelight	1	18 May 1980
Tom Petty and the Heartbreakers	Damn the Torpedoes	2	25 May 1980
Mi-Sex	Space Race^{‡}	4	8 June 1980
Willie Nelson	Stardust	6	6 July 1980
Neil Young & Crazy Horse	Live Rust	1	17 August 1980
Roxy Music	Flesh + Blood	2	24 August 1980
Kiss	Unmasked	1	7 September 1980
Bob Marley and the Wailers	Uprising	1	14 September 1980
XTC	Black Sea	1	21 September 1980
Bob Marley and the Wailers	Uprising	2	28 September 1980
David Bowie	Scary Monsters	2	12 October 1980
Supertramp	Paris	1	26 October 1980
David Bowie	Scary Monsters	1	2 November 1980
Barbra Streisand	Guilty	5	9 November 1980
Kenny Rogers	Greatest Hits	2	14 December 1980
Summer break - no chart (1 week)
Artist	Album	Weeks at number 1	Reached number 1
Summer break - no chart (2 weeks)
Kenny Rogers	Greatest Hits	1	18 January 1981
David Bowie	Chameleon	1	25 January 1981
Anne Murray	Anne Murray's Greatest Hits	6	1 February 1981
John Lennon / Yoko Ono	Double Fantasy	1	15 March 1981
The Nolans	Making Waves	1	22 March 1981
John Lennon / Yoko Ono	Double Fantasy	3	29 March 1981
Split Enz	Waiata^{‡}	1	19 April 1981
Easter holiday - no chart (1 week)
Split Enz	Waiata^{‡}	2	3 May 1981
Richard Clayderman	Rêveries	2	17 May 1981
The Cure	Faith	3	31 May 1981
Joy Division	Unknown Pleasures	1	21 June 1981
Tom Petty and the Heartbreakers	Hard Promises	2	28 June 1981
Kim Carnes	Mistaken Identity	3	12 July 1981
Stars On 45	Long Play Album	3	2 August 1981
The Pretenders	Pretenders II	1	23 August 1981
Cliff Richard	Cliff Richard 1958-1981	2	30 August 1981
The Rolling Stones	Tattoo You	2	13 September 1981
Carol O'Halloran	Jazzercise	4	27 September 1981
Royal Philharmonic Orchestra	Hooked on Classics	2	25 October 1981
Queen	Greatest Hits	5	8 November 1981
Simon & Garfunkel	The Simon and Garfunkel Collection	2	13 December 1981
Summer break - no chart (1 week)
Artist	Album	Weeks at number 1	Reached number 1
Summer break - no chart (2 weeks)
Blondie	The Best of Blondie	3	17 January 1982
Men at Work	Business as Usual	7	7 February 1982
Elton John	Jump Up!	2	28 March 1982
Men at Work	Business as Usual	1	11 April 1982
Easter holiday - no chart (1 week)
DD Smash	Cool Bananas^{‡}	1	25 April 1982
Split Enz	Time and Tide^{‡}	2	2 May 1982
Anne Murray	Greatest Hits Vol. II	1	16 May 1982
Men at Work	Business as Usual	2	23 May 1982
The Human League	Dare	3	6 June 1982
Roxy Music	Avalon	3	27 June 1982
Joan Jett and the Blackhearts	I Love Rock 'n' Roll	1	18 July 1982
Roxy Music	Avalon	1	25 July 1982
Split Enz	Time and Tide^{‡}	1	1 August 1982
Cold Chisel	Circus Animals	1	8 August 1982
Roxy Music	Avalon	1	15 August 1982
Split Enz	Time and Tide^{‡}	3	22 August 1982
ABC	The Lexicon of Love	3	12 September 1982
Dire Straits	Love over Gold	8	3 October 1982
The Kids from "Fame"	The Kids From "Fame	1	28 November 1982
Dire Straits	Love over Gold	3	5 December 1982
Summer break - no chart (1 week)
Artist	Album	Weeks at number 1	Reached number 1
Summer break - no chart (3 weeks)
Split Enz	Enz of an Era^{‡}	2	23 January 1983
Icehouse	Primitive Man	3	6 February 1983
Simon & Garfunkel	The Concert in Central Park	2	27 February 1983
Little River Band	Greatest Hits	4	13 March 1983
Easter holiday - no chart (1 week)
Dire Straits	Love over Gold	1	17 April 1983
Pink Floyd	The Final Cut	1	24 April 1983
David Bowie	Let's Dance	5	1 May 1983
Michael Jackson	Thriller	5	5 June 1983
David Bowie	Let's Dance	1	10 July 1983
Bonnie Tyler	Faster Than the Speed of Night	3	17 July 1983
The Police	Synchronicity	2	7 August 1983
Tim Finn^{‡}	Escapade	1	21 August 1983
The Police	Synchronicity	1	28 August 1983
Wham!	Fantastic	3	4 September 1983
Spandau Ballet	True	1	25 September 1983
Yazoo	You and Me Both	1	2 October 1983
Robert Plant	The Principle of Moments	4	9 October 1983
UB40	Labour of Love	3	6 November 1983
Culture Club	Colour by Numbers	1	27 November 1983
David Bowie	Let's Dance	2	4 December 1983
Duran Duran	Seven and the Ragged Tiger	1	18 December 1983
Summer break - no chart (1 week)
Artist	Album	Weeks at number 1	Reached number 1
Summer break - no chart (3 weeks)
Billy Joel	An Innocent Man	1	22 January 1984
Eurythmics	Touch	1	29 January 1984
Hall & Oates	Rock 'n Soul Part 1	1	5 February 1984
Simple Minds	Sparkle in the Rain	2	12 February 1984
U2	Under a Blood Red Sky	1	26 February 1984
Foster and Allen	Maggie	2	4 March 1984
Michael Jackson	Thriller	1	18 March 1984
Easter holiday - no chart (1 week)
Michael Jackson	Thriller	6	1 April 1984
Thompson Twins	Into the Gap	1	13 May 1984
Lionel Richie	Can't Slow Down	1	20 May 1984
Thompson Twins	Into the Gap	2	27 May 1984
Soundtrack	Footloose	8	10 June 1984
Billy Joel	An Innocent Man	2	5 August 1984
Bob Marley and the Wailers	Legend	4	19 August 1984
Sade	Diamond Life	2	16 September 1984
Julio Iglesias	1100 Bel Air Place	4	30 September 1984
The Cars	Heartbeat City	1	28 October 1984
U2	The Unforgettable Fire	3	4 November 1984
Bruce Springsteen	Born in the U.S.A.	1	25 November 1984
Sade	Diamond Life	2	2 December 1984
The Cars	Heartbeat City	1	16 December 1984
Summer break - no chart (2 week)
Artist	Album	Weeks at number 1	Reached number 1
Summer break - no chart (2 weeks)
Frankie Goes to Hollywood	Welcome to the Pleasuredome	2	20 January 1985
Wham!	Make It Big	1	3 February 1985
Bruce Springsteen	Born in the U.S.A.	2	10 February 1985
Alison Moyet	Alf	1	24 February 1985
Bruce Springsteen	Born in the U.S.A.	6	3 March 1985
Easter holiday - no chart (1 week)
Phil Collins	No Jacket Required	1	21 April 1985
Bruce Springsteen	Born in the U.S.A.	6	28 April 1985
Dire Straits	Brothers in Arms	3	9 June 1985
Talking Heads	Little Creatures	3	30 June 1985
Madonna	Like a Virgin	3	21 July 1985
Billy Joel	Greatest Hits	3	11 August 1985
Madonna	Like a Virgin	5	1 September 1985
Bryan Adams	Reckless	6	6 October 1985
ZZ Top	Afterburner	3	17 November 1985
Dire Straits	Brothers in Arms	2	8 December 1985
Summer break - no chart (2 week)
Artist	Album	Weeks at number 1	Reached number 1
Summer break - no chart (2 weeks)
Dire Straits	Brothers in Arms	3	19 January 1986
Thompson Twins	Here's to Future Days	2	9 February 1986
Dire Straits	Brothers in Arms	6	23 February 1986
Easter holiday - no chart (1 week)
Dire Straits	Brothers in Arms	2	13 April 1986
Grace Jones	Island Life	2	27 April 1986
Dire Straits	Brothers in Arms	1	11 May 1986
Barbra Streisand	The Broadway Album	1	18 May 1986
Dire Straits	Brothers in Arms	4	25 May 1986
A-ha	Hunting High and Low	2	22 June 1986
Peter Gabriel	So	1	6 July 1986
Madonna	True Blue	2	13 July 1986
Bryan Ferry and Roxy Music	Street Life: 20 Great Hits	3	27 July 1986
Wham!	The Final	7	17 August 1986
Talking Heads	True Stories	5	5 October 1986
Genesis	Invisible Touch	1	9 November 1986
Talking Heads	True Stories	1	16 November 1986
Huey Lewis and the News	Fore!	1	23 November 1986
Paul Simon	Graceland	3	30 November 1986
The Police	Every Breath You Take: The Singles	1	21 December 1986
Summer break - no chart (1 week)
Artist	Album	Weeks at number 1	Reached number 1
Summer break - no chart (2 weeks)
Revenge	Eurythmics	10	18 January 1987
U2	The Joshua Tree	1	29 March 1987
Pseudo Echo	Funky Town	3	5 April 1987
Easter holiday - no chart (1 week)
U2	The Joshua Tree	2	3 May 1987
Alison Moyet	Raindancing	2	17 May 1987
Bon Jovi	Slippery When Wet	5	31 May 1987
Whitney Houston	Whitney	2	5 July 1987
Bon Jovi	Slippery When Wet	2	19 July 1987
Suzanne Vega	Solitude Standing	2	2 August 1987
U2	The Joshua Tree	5	16 August 1987
Bon Jovi	Slippery When Wet	1	20 September 1987
Michael Jackson	Bad	1	27 September 1987
Chris Rea	Dancing with Strangers	1	4 October 1987
Midnight Oil	Diesel and Dust	6	11 October 1987
Pink Floyd	A Momentary Lapse of Reason	2	22 November 1987
Midnight Oil	Diesel and Dust	1	6 December 1987
Pink Floyd	A Momentary Lapse of Reason	1	13 December 1987
Midnight Oil	Diesel and Dust	1	20 December 1987
Summer break - no chart (1 week)
Artist	Album	Weeks at number 1	Reached number 1
Summer break - no chart (2 weeks)
Midnight Oil	Diesel and Dust	1	17 January 1988
Pink Floyd	A Momentary Lapse of Reason	2	24 January 1988
Icehouse	Man of Colours	2	7 February 1988
Pink Floyd	A Momentary Lapse of Reason	1	21 February 1988
Soundtrack	Dirty Dancing	6	28 February 1988
Easter holiday - no chart (1 week)
Orchestral Manoeuvres in the Dark	The Best of OMD	4	17 April 1988
Andrew Lloyd Webber	The Phantom of the Opera	1	15 May 1988
Orchestral Manoeuvres in the Dark	The Best of OMD	1	22 May 1988
Tiffany	Tiffany	3	29 May 1988
Prince	Lovesexy	2	19 June 1988
Andrew Lloyd Webber	The Phantom of the Opera	2	3 July 1988
Def Leppard	Hysteria	3	17 July 1988
INXS	Kick	2	7 August 1988
Andrew Lloyd Webber	The Phantom of the Opera	2	21 August 1988
Kylie Minogue	Kylie	6	4 September 1988
Bros	Push	1	16 October 1988
Bon Jovi	New Jersey	2	23 October 1988
U2	Rattle and Hum	7	6 November 1988
Summer break - no chart (1 week)
Artist	Album	Weeks at number 1	Reached number 1
Summer break - no chart (2 weeks)
U2	Rattle and Hum	1	15 January 1989
Fleetwood Mac	Greatest Hits	1	22 January 1989
Jimmy Barnes	Barnestorming	2	29 January 1989
Soundtrack	Cocktail	2	12 February 1989
Tracy Chapman	Tracy Chapman	4	5 March 1989
Easter holiday - no chart (1 week)
Enya	Watermark	2	9 April 1989
Toni Childs	Union	1	23 April 1989
Poison	Open Up and Say... Ahh!	1	30 April 1989
Toni Childs	Union	1	7 May 1989
Andrew Lloyd Webber	The Premiere Collection	3	14 May 1989
Guns N' Roses	Appetite for Destruction	1	4 June 1989
Simply Red	A New Flame	7	11 June 1989
Clannad	Past Present	6	30 July 1989
Carl Doy	Piano by Candlelight II^{‡}	4	10 September 1989
Milli Vanilli	All or Nothing	3	8 October 1989
Tracy Chapman	Crossroads	7	29 October 1989
Milli Vanilli	All or Nothing - The US Remix Album	1	17 December 1989
Summer break - no chart (2 weeks)
Artist	Album	Weeks at number 1	Reached number 1
