= Take On the World =

Take On the World may refer to:

- "Take On the World" (Judas Priest song), 1979
- "Take On the World" (Pseudo Echo song), 1987
- "Take On the World", the opening theme by Rowan Blanchard and Sabrina Carpenter from the television series Girl Meets World (2014–2017), on the compilation album Disney Channel Play It Loud (2014)
