= Fast Car (disambiguation) =

"Fast Car" is a 1988 song by Tracy Chapman, also covered by Jonas Blue in 2015 and by Luke Combs in 2023.

Fast Car or Fast Cars may also refer to:

== Magazines ==
- Fast Car (magazine), UK-based car magazine

== Music ==
- "Fast Car" (Namie Amuro song), from the 2009 album Past<Future
- "Fast Car" (Taio Cruz song), from the 2011 album TY.O
- "Fast Car", song by Wyclef Jean from Carnival Vol. II: Memoirs of an Immigrant
- "Fast Cars", song by Nazareth from Malice in Wonderland
- "Fast Cars", song by the Buzzcocks from Another Music in a Different Kitchen
- "Fast Cars", song by Bon Jovi from The Circle
- "Fast Cars", song by U2 from How to Dismantle an Atomic Bomb
- "Fast Cars", song by Cicada
- "Fast Cars", song by Pseudo Echo from Teleporter
- "Fast Cars", song by Rehab from Fixtape
- "Fast Cars", song by RZA from Birth of a Prince

== See also ==
- Production car speed record
