= It's No Secret =

It's No Secret may refer to:

- It Is No Secret, 1951, by Stuart Hamblen
- It's No Secret (Kylie Minogue song), 1988
- It's No Secret, a song by Jefferson Airplane from the 1966 album Jefferson Airplane Takes Off
- It's No Secret, a song by Ringo Starr from the 1977 album Ringo the 4th
