= Yamaha Music Foundation =

Japanese nonprofit organization

The Yamaha Music Foundation is an organization established in 1966 by the authority of the Japanese Ministry of Education for the purpose of promoting music education and music popularization. It continued a program of music classes begun by Yamaha Corporation in 1954. Its unique, systematic teaching method and teacher training programs are highly valued in Japan and other countries.

The Yamaha Grade Examination System has been developed to enable students and teachers to ensure their own progress and thereby obtain self-confidence in their own music studies. The Yamaha Grade Examination System consists of nine grades, Grade 9 to Grade 1. The examination evaluates the performing ability of the music lovers in general; the performing ability and the musical knowledge and techniques required for the instructors of the fundamentals stage; and also the performing competence of the professional musicians.

The foundation is known for its organizing of the World Popular Song Festival which it organized from 1970 until 1989.
