= Kylie (album) =

1988 album by Kylie Minogue

Studio album by Kylie Minogue
- Released: 4 July 1988
- Recorded: October 1987–April 1988
- Studios: PWL (London); Allan Eaton (Victoria); RBX (Melbourne)
- Genres: Dance-pop; disco-pop; bubblegum pop
- Length: 35:25
- Labels: Mushroom; PWL; Geffen
- Producer: Stock Aitken Waterman

Kylie Minogue chronology
| Kylie (1988) | Enjoy Yourself (1989) |

Singles from Kylie
- 1. "I Should Be So Lucky" Released: 29 December 1987; 2. "Got to Be Certain" Released: 2 May 1988; 3. "The Loco-Motion" Released: 28 July 1988; 4. "Je ne sais pas pourquoi" Released: 10 October 1988; 5. "It's No Secret" Released: 15 December 1988; 6. "Turn It into Love" Released: 21 December 1988

Repackaged edition cover
- The Kylie Collection artwork

Kylie is the debut studio album by Australian singer Kylie Minogue, released on 4 July 1988 by Mushroom Records. Minogue had established herself as a child actress before signing to the record label in early 1987. The success of her debut single, "Locomotion", resulted in her working with Stock Aitken Waterman, who produced the album and wrote nine of its ten tracks. Their recording sessions, commencing in October 1987 in London and Melbourne, coincided with Minogue's filming schedule for the soap opera Neighbours.

Musically, Kylie is a bubblegum pop and dance-pop album. It received mixed reviews from music critics who praised individual tracks but criticised Minogue's vocals and the album's formulaic production. The album has been received more positively in retrospect, with praise being towards Minogue's charm and the album's nostalgic sentimentality. It was a commercial success, peaking at number one in the United Kingdom for six weeks and becoming the fifth highest-selling album of the decade. It peaked at number two in her native Australia, while reaching the top ten in Germany, Norway, and Switzerland. Kylie was re-issued in 1988 as The Kylie Collection, in 2015 and 2023 when it returned to the UK Albums Chart. The album has sold over five million copies worldwide.

Six singles were released from Kylie. "I Should Be So Lucky" reached number one in Australia and the United Kingdom, the first for any artist. The subsequent singles—"Got to Be Certain", the re-recorded "The Loco-Motion", and "Je ne sais pas pourquoi" all peaked in the top two on the UK Singles Chart. "It's No Secret" was her third top-forty single on the Billboard Hot 100, while "Turn It into Love" was released exclusively in Japan. The album's commercial success helped Minogue establish herself as an international teen idol and launch her recording career.

== Background ==
Kylie Minogue was born in Melbourne in 1968, the eldest of three children. She was a child actress from the age of eleven, appearing in cameo roles in The Sullivans (1979) and Skyways (1980). In April 1986, Minogue played Charlene Mitchell, a schoolgirl turned garage mechanic, in the soap opera Neighbours. Jason Donovan, whom Minogue began dating at the time, played her onscreen love interest as Scott Robinson. Their romantic relationship culminated with a wedding in an episode that attracted an audience of 20 million British viewers in 1987. During her time in Neighbours, Minogue joined a band along with cast members Guy Pearce, Peter O'Brien and Alan Dale, which was arranged by producer Greg Petherick. He later suggested Minogue cover the song "The Loco-Motion" with the band during a Fitzroy Football Club benefit concert in 1986.

Impressed by the performance, Petherick arranged for Minogue to record the former song, re-titled as "Locomotion", with producer Kaj Dahlstrom, who invested $10,000 to record it. Petherick submitted the demo track to many record labels before reaching out to Michael Gudinski, head of Mushroom Records. Gudinski was reluctant at first, calling the demo "a bit of a one-hit wonder". During a trip to London several months after receiving the demo track, Gudinski decided to sign Minogue because of her popularity from Neighbours. She signed with the label in early 1987. Critics and employees of Mushroom Records gave polarised opinions; many thought it would be the end of the company and dubbed Minogue as "The Singing Budgie."

In June 1987, Mushroom Records had Mike Duffy, an audio engineer for Stock Aitken Waterman producers, over for a three-month residency at Platinum Studios in South Yarra. He was asked to remix the "Locomotion" demo track with the help of a synthesizer to make it sound more like Bananarama's cover of "Venus" (1986). Instead of remixing the track, which was originally in a big band style, Duffy opted to record a completely new backing track, inspired by the hi-NRG pop of UK band Dead or Alive. It was the first time he had produced a record himself. The song was released as Minogue's debut single on 27 July 1987, three weeks after Neighbours wedding episode premiered. A week after its release, the single topped the Australian charts, remaining there for seven weeks and becoming the best-selling single of the decade. Around that time, Minogue was set up with Terry Blamey, who would be her manager for 25 years.

== Recording ==
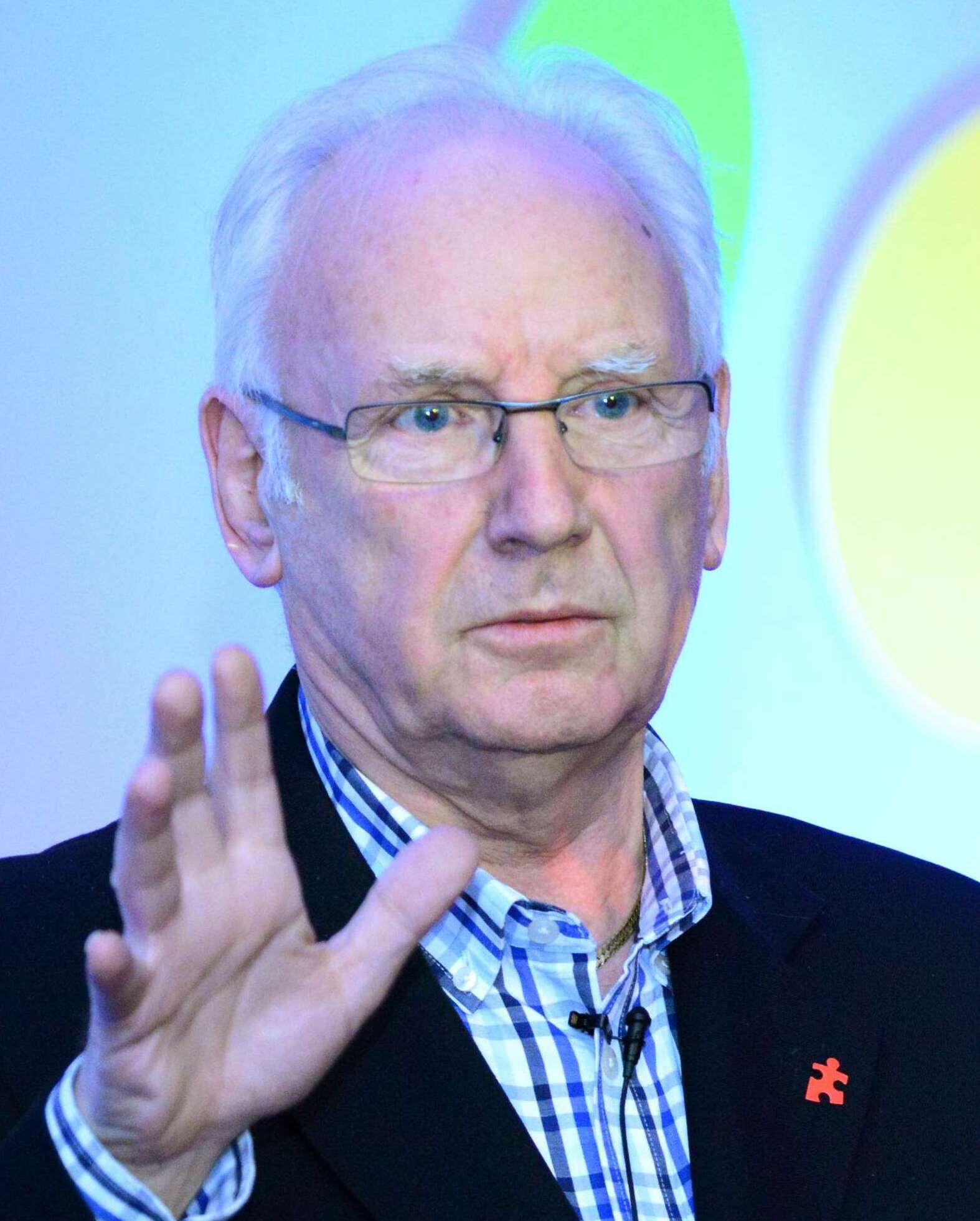
Pete Waterman (pictured in 2014) wrote and produced Kylie along with Matt Aitken and Mike Stock.

The success of "Locomotion" resulted in Minogue and Blamey travelling to London to work with Stock, Aitken and Waterman in September 1987. Pete Waterman, the only member of the trio aware of Minogue's trip, was unavailable; he was busy making The Hitman and Her and had not told Mike Stock she was in London. Minogue and Blamey waited for ten days in their hotel without hearing from the producers. A worried Blamey resorted to lying about Minogue's UK departure date, in order to force SAW to schedule a session with her. The duo were then given the studio time, purportedly at the last minute, after PWL's director David Howells intervened and arranged it for Minogue.

The producers wrote "I Should Be So Lucky" in 40 minutes and Minogue recorded it quickly before she returned to Australia that afternoon to work on Neighbours. Stock recalled the abrupt session: "Her ear is very tuned in so I sang her the tune and she sang it back at me and at that point I put the tapes aside and went on to other things ... We treated [Minogue] rather shabbily." He wrote the lyrics in response to what he had learned about Minogue: although she was an attractive successful soap star, he thought there had to be something wrong with her and figured she must be unlucky in love. Minogue left the studio angry, complaining she had no idea what the song sounded like, after being fed the lyrics to sing line by line. At the time, the producers did not take Minogue's career seriously because of time constraints and her obligations to Neighbours. They did not even listen to the song until Waterman heard it played by a DJ at a Christmas party that year and thought that it was remarkable.

In February 1988, Stock traveled to Melbourne and apologised to Minogue for her previous recording session. They went on to record "Got to Be Certain" and "Turn It into Love" with her. Recording sessions with Stock and engineer Karen Hewitt took place at Allan Eaton Studios and RBX Studios in Melbourne for only a couple of hours at night, between filming her last episodes for Neighbours. She frequently broke down emotionally at the studio due to pressure from work. The album was recorded in snatches; Stock taught Minogue the songs, which she would record in an hour. Waterman recalled, "If you could get four hours with her, it was the most you could get... We were almost not able to even play her the songs!" Despite the pressure, he found the sessions were not stressful because of their work ethic: "That's what we were used to. In fact, in hindsight, the truth is it was so enjoyable because we didn't have time to get stressed." In March, Minogue took a break from filming Neighbours to record the album in London.

The producers re-recorded "Locomotion" at their studio in London and changed the name back to "The Loco-Motion". Waterman justified the decision by slating the original Australian recording, which he claimed to be poorly produced. Mike Duffy, the original producer, instead blamed the decision to re-record on Waterman's alleged wish to claim the royalties from the track's placement on the soundtrack of the 1988 film Arthur 2: On the Rocks. Portions of the vocals from the demo track were kept in the new version. The singer stayed with her mother in Waterman's apartment during the recording sessions over Easter in 1988, which took place at PWL Studios 1, 2 & 5 (London).

== Music and lyrics ==
The producers wanted to make a synthesised pop album that appeals to teenagers. Stock explained his intention was to make an album full of single-potential tracks, similar to the form of greatest hits compilations. The singer was interested in recording more contemporary R&B material but her request was denied by Waterman. "These producers think pop music is candy music. They're saying: 'Here kids, have a piece of candy'... What Peterman wants, he gets", said Minogue. Her voice was double-tracked for most of the album; the producers only allowed Minogue to use her real voice on "Look My Way", a track that she felt sounds more like herself than the rest. Stock, Aitken, and Waterman composed and produced all the tracks on Kylie except "The Loco-Motion" written by Gerry Goffin and Carole King. Three tracks were written for other PWL artists in the previous year before appearing on the album: "Got to Be Certain" was recorded by Mandy Smith for her debut album but abandoned; "Look My Way" was originally written for Heywoode; "Love at First Sight" was an instrumental demo track for Sinitta and is unrelated to Minogue's 2002 song with the same title.

"I Should Be So Lucky"
The dance-pop album opens with "I Should Be So Lucky", a track recorded in 40 minutes using a drum machine, keyboards and bass.

Critics described Kylie as a bubblegum pop, disco-pop and dance-pop album, while also noting the musical similarities to other albums produced by PWL. Sal Cinquemani of Slant Magazine described it as a collection of house tracks blended with "hi-NRG beats, Italo-disco synths and Motown melodies." Kylie opens with "I Should Be So Lucky", a light dance-pop track that uses a drum machine, keyboards and bass by Stock. The track has been compared to the work of Rick Astley, a fellow PWL artist. For the album's version of "The Loco-Motion", the producers re-recorded the backing track from Duffy's demo, featuring railway sound effects and less spontaneous vocals.

The slow-tempo "Je ne sais pas pourquoi" reminiscent of Waterman's earlier work in the 1960s at the Mecca Dance Hall, and the reggae-infused "It's No Secret" features cascading synth and a jaunty melody. It was followed by Hi-NRG tracks "Turn It Into Love" and "Got to Be Certain"; the latter work gained comparison to the soundtrack of the 1983 romance film Flashdance. The mid-tempo "I Miss You" and "I'll Still Be Loving You" resemble other late-80s pop tracks, particularly the work of Climie Fisher and Living in a Box. "Look My Way" draws musical inspiration from The Whispers' "Rock Steady" (1987), Madonna's "Into the Groove" (1985), and Debbie Gibson's "Shake Your Love" (1987). In The Complete Kylie (2008), Simon Sheridan felt the pop-soul "Look My Way" is similar to the work of American R&B artists Alexander O'Neal and S.O.S. Band.

The album avoided getting into heavy statements and deep themes that might alienate Minogue's young fans. Joe Sweeney of PopMatters and Quentin Harrison of Albumism highlighted lyrics about romantic relationships and positive mentality throughout the album. Sweeney commented that such themes would later infuse Minogue's post-millennial work. Sheridan found the album demonstrates a refreshing carefree attitude in its lyrics. Matthew Lindsay of Classic Pop, on the other hand, pointed out the main themes about heartbreak, betrayal and frustration. "I Should Be So Lucky" depicts a frustrated young woman who feels unlucky in romance. In a 2019 interview, Minogue said that she did not realise at the time about the dark tone in the lyrics—in the case of "I Should Be So Lucky", she stated, "we all sing like it's really happy, but it's not. She wishes she was lucky in love." "Turn It Into Love" discusses unrequited love with a wistful-yet-optimistic approach. Minogue sings the lovelorn "Got to Be Certain" in an upbeat and carefree way, while affirming a false love affair in "It's No Secret".

== Artwork and release ==
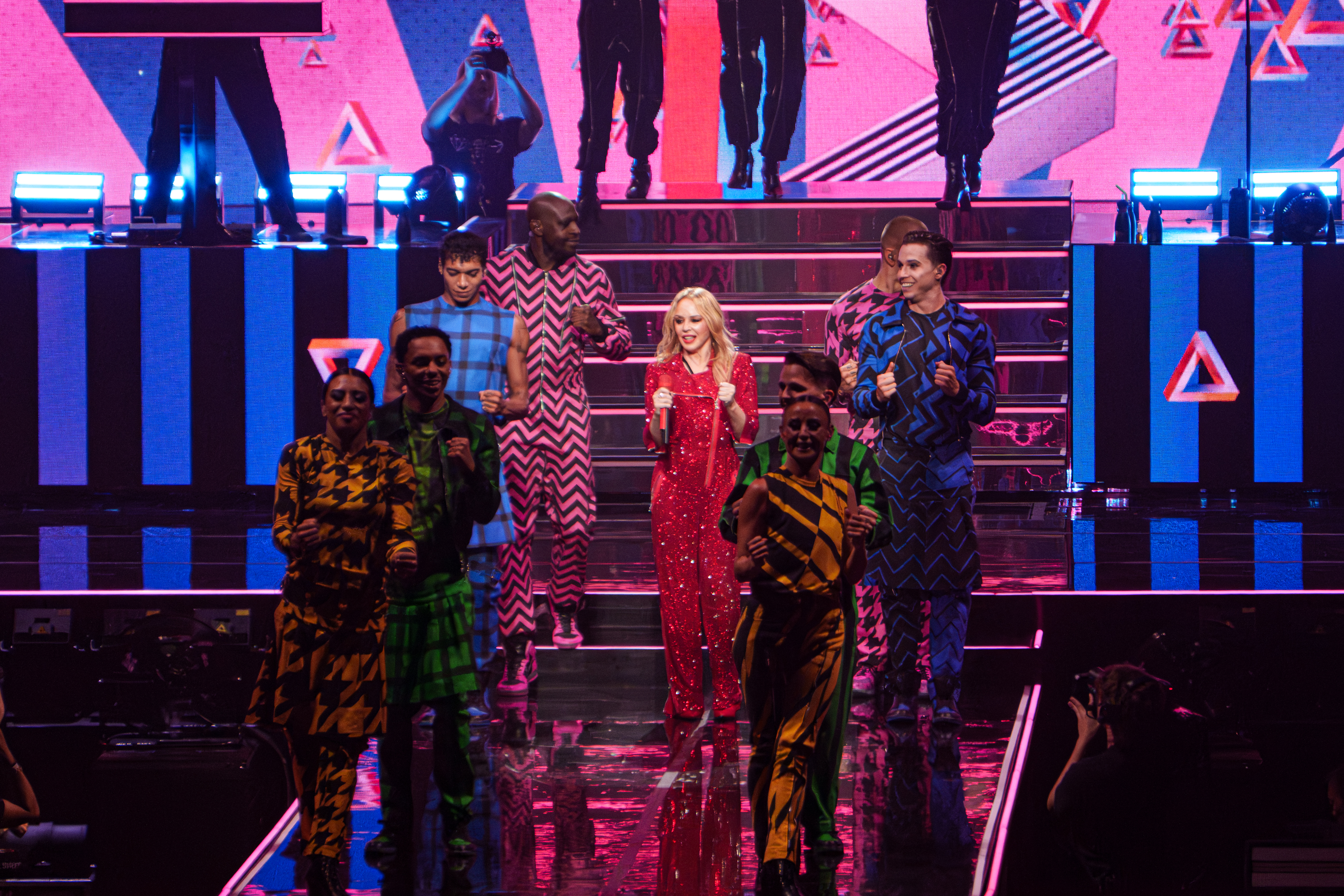
Minogue singing the album's third single, "The Loco-Motion", during the Tension Tour (2025). The song reached the third spot of the Billboard Hot 100.

Kids and teenagers were the target audience for Kylie; Waterman adapted the idea and was fascinated by how teenagers reacted to Minogue's work. It is reflected in the album's artwork, shot by photographer Lawrence Lawry, which shows Minogue grinning and wearing a hat of hair with curls cascading out of the top. The hat was made by London designer Bernstock Speirs, who was embarrassed with the design and kept the work in secret for a long time. Howells said the artwork shows Minogue in a girlie and carefree way that kids can relate to, instead of "some icon on a pedestal". He was inspired by the way teenagers tear pictures out of magazines and stick them to walls, referring to it as the "magazine approach". Other PWL artists posing with hats using the same strategy can be seen on the covers of Mandy Smith's Mandy (1988), Minogue's follow-up Enjoy Yourself (1989) and Sonia's Everybody Knows (1990). Ernie Long of The Morning Call noted similarities between the release of Kylie and the 1988 eponymous debut albums of Tracie Spencer and Rachele Cappelli: all three shows close-up shots of the singer on the front cover, while making silly facial expressions on the back.

Kylie was first released in the UK on 4 July 1988, and was released in Australia a fortnight later, on 18 July 1988. Similar to other late 1980s albums, the record label took charge of Kylie's running orders and pushed upcoming singles to the front. Gudinski stated the producers from PWL were not focused on promoting Kylie in the United States' market. However, Blamey sent Minogue to look into releasing her material during her two-week break there. David Geffen, founder of Geffen Records, agreed in distributing the album after watching several video clips of Minogue.

=== Additional releases ===
Kylie was repackaged as The Kylie Collection in Australia on 5 December 1988, featuring bonus mixes and music videos of the singles. Ian Gormely of Exclaim! called it a compilation of "unremarkable and cheesy clips that present the singer as a clean-cut teen". PWL re-released Kylie in Japan in 2012 with bonus mixes. In October 2014, Cherry Red Records and PWL announced to re-released Kylie along with her studio albums Enjoy Yourself, Rhythm of Love (1990), and Let's Get to It (1991). The release date was later postponed to 9 February 2015. The albums have been digitally remastered from the original studio tapes. They were available on vinyl, CD, and DVD. This is the first time these albums have been released in the United Kingdom since their original release. A limited vinyl edition of Kylie was released by BMG on 24 November 2023 to celebrate the album's 35th anniversary. The physical album came in two coloured vinyl variants.

Minogue's debut VHS release, The Videos, which was distributed by Mushroom Records in 1988 in Australia, contains the music videos for "The Loco-Motion" and "I Should Be So Lucky", as well as the behind the scenes footage. That same year, a follow-up VHS titled Kylie: The Videos was released in Japan, France, and the United Kingdom. It included an interview with Minogue, as well as music videos for "Got to Be Certain" and "Je Ne Sais Pas Pourquoi". Kylie: The Videos was the top-selling video in 1988 in the UK, with 330,000 copies sold after 42 weeks of release. Kylie's Remixes, a nine-track remix compilation of seven songs from Kylie, was released in 1988 in Japan. It peaked at number 13 on the Oricon Albums Chart and sold 84,000 copies, as of 2006. It was certified gold by the Recording Industry Association of Japan in May 1989. The compilation was later released in Australia in 1993.

== Promotion ==
After filming her last scenes for Neighbours in June and July 1988, Minogue was able to relocate to London to concentrate on the promotional work for Kylie. This included her performances on Terry Wogan's television talk show and the opening for a new ride at Alton Towers amusement park. Waterman also spent a large amount of money on TV advertising for the album. In September, Minogue did a three-month promotional trip in the United States, Japan, Melbourne and the United Kingdom. The singer had to cut it short due to emotional exhaustion. In October 1989, more than a year after the album was released, Minogue launched her first concert tour, Disco in Dream performing several songs from both Kylie and Enjoy Yourself. It began in Japan, where she performed in front of 38,000 fans at the Tokyo Dome. She later joined other artists from the PWL label on a ten-date theatre tour in the United Kingdom, which attracted 170,000 fans. Its run in the United Kingdom was sponsored by local radio stations and was re-titled The Hitman Roadshow. ALFA International and Video Collection International released the video album On the Go: Live in Japan in April 1990 in Japan and the United Kingdom. It contained footage shot during the Disco in Dream concert tour and was available in VHS and Laserdisc formats. A video from the concert tour with backstage footage was shown on a Christmas special on ITV called Kylie On The Go in 1990.

=== Singles ===
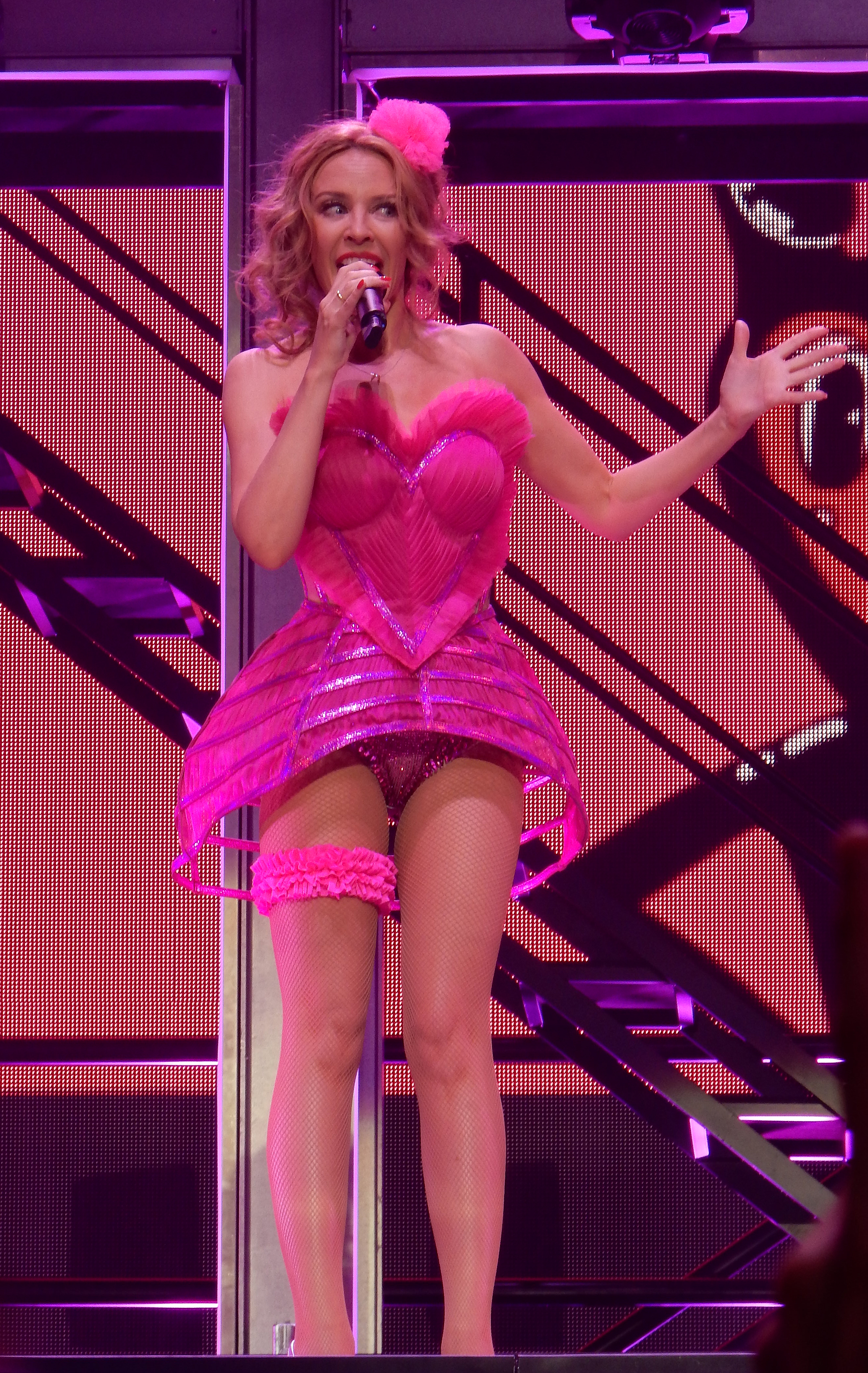
Minogue performing a medley of album singles "I Should Be So Lucky" and "Got to Be Certain" during the Kiss Me Once Tour (2014)

Despite the buzz surrounding "Locomotion" in 1987, Waterman could not get a major label interested in "I Should Be So Lucky". He decided to issue it on his own PWL Records imprint instead. Released as the first single from Kylie in late December 1987, "I Should Be So Lucky" topped the charts in the United Kingdom and Australia, the first time this had been achieved by any artist. It remained at number-one on the UK Singles Chart for five consecutive weeks, and on Australia's Kent Music Report for another sixth consecutive weeks. It peaked at number twenty-eight on the Billboard Hot 100 and topped the charts in Switzerland, and Germany. Two music videos were made for the single: one with Minogue singing in a bubble-filled bath, and another where she hangs out of a convertible BMW driving through Sydney.

"Got to Be Certain", the second single, was released on 2 May 1988. It was Minogue's third number-one single in Australia. In the United Kingdom, it reached number two for three weeks, while peaking within the top ten in Germany and Switzerland. Its music video shows Minogue doing a fashion photo shoot, singing on top of the KPMG Tower and alongside the Yarra River. "The Loco-Motion" was released in Europe and the United States on 25 July 1988 as the third single. It debuted on the UK Singles Chart at number two, setting the record for the highest entry by a female artist. It also peaked at number three on the Billboard Hot 100, and number five on the RPM Canadian Top Singles chart. The music video for "The Loco-Motion" was re-edited from footage of the original Australian release, which was shot at Essendon Airport and the ABC Studios in Melbourne. In the video, Minogue is seen dancing against a backdrop of graffiti and singing in a studio, while her brother Brendan appeared as a cameo at the end of the clip.

Originally planned as a double A-side with new track "Made in Heaven", "Je ne sais pas pourquoi" was released as the fourth single on 17 October 1988. It was re-titled as "I Still Love You (Je Ne Sais Pas Pourquoi)" in Australia and the United States. It was Kylie's fifth top two single on the UK Singles Chart, Minogue's strongest run of singles from an album—the four singles had sold a combine 1.8 million units in the UK in 1988 alone. It also reached the top ten in Norway and New Zealand. Its music video features Minogue dancing and speaking French. The fifth single "It's No Secret" was released in North America, Japan and New Zealand on 7 February 1989. It peaked at number 37 on the Billboard Hot 100, Minogue's third consecutive top forty single in the United States. A still from the music video, which shows Minogue walking through to the beach and to a pool at the Mirage Resort, was used as the front cover of the Australian single release. "Turn It into Love" was released exclusively in Japan as the fifth single, peaking at number 34. It had sold 46,320 copies in the country as of 2006.

== Critical reception ==
Professional ratings
Review scores
| Source | Rating |
|---|---|
| AllMusic | 2.5/5 stars |
| Digital Spy | 3/5 stars |
| The Encyclopedia of Popular Music | 3/5 stars |
| Number One | 4/5 stars |
| The Record | 1.5/5 stars |
| Record Mirror | 4/5 medals |
| Record-Journal | F |
| Smash Hits | 8/10 stars |

Kylie received mixed reviews from contemporary music critics, many of whom questioned its production. Tim Nicholson of Record Mirror wrote that besides the cover of "The Loco-Motion", the album is full of "rattling, Hi-NRG based perfect pop [songs]" that has hit-single potential. In the Recommended section, the writers of Billboard applauded the cover of "The Loco-Motion" but found the "mechanical production and assembly-line writing... may lack the warm necessary for a U.S. breakthrough". Chris Heath of Smash Hits praised the simple disco tracks, while Shaun Carney of The Age criticised its calculated and commercialised nature. Barbra Jaeger of The Record panned the overuse of drum machines and echo vocals by the SAW producers, finding their music is "just a variation of the same beat".

Several reviewers criticised Minogue's vocal delivery. J.D. Considine of The Baltimore Sun felt the record was aggravated by her lack of maturity and poor pronunciation, especially on "It's No Secret". Jim Zebora of American newspaper Record-Journal panned her nasal vocals and her lack of input on the songwriting and producing process, referring to the singer as another Madonna wannabe. Dennis Hunt of The Los Angeles Times and Ernie Long, on the other hand, felt her fragile voice sounds comfortable and natural with the dance-pop material. Writing for The Age, Mike Daly commented that despite having a reasonable voice, Minogue was overpowered by the manufactured and forgettable production.

In their retrospective reviews, Chris True from AllMusic, Nick Levine of Digital Spy, and Sweeney panned the dated production but felt Minogue's upbeat personality and well-crafted melodies compensated for its weaknesses. While reviewing the album on its 30th anniversary, Harrison described it as an "unassuming, but charming collection of well-intentioned commercial pop". Rolling Stone suggested the songs are as "cheesily and identically redolent of the late 80s' as a pair of stone-washed jean shorts", while Sheridan called the album a "masterclass in classic British pop". Classic Pop writers Ian Peel and Mark Elliot commended the memorable hooks and the Hi-NRG pop tunes that set the benchmark for her career; the latter critic ranked it as the third-best Stock Aitken Waterman album. Cinquemani, however, ranked Kylie as Minogue's worst studio album in 2018, criticizing the lightweight content and her vocals as if "she was forced to suck down a lungful of helium". In The Encyclopedia of Popular Music (2011), British writer Colin Larkin gave the album three out of five stars, classifying it as "recommended" and "highly listenable".

== Commercial performance ==
The album debuted at number two on the UK Albums Chart on 16 July 1988. In its seventh week, it peaked at number one and stayed there for four consecutive weeks. Minogue became the youngest artist to have a number-one album when she was 20 years and 8 months old—she held that record until Canadian recording artist Avril Lavigne's Let Go reached the top of the chart in 2002, when she was 18. Kylie topped the chart for two additional weeks in November, for a total of six weeks in the number-one position, her longest-running number-one album on this chart. It was the best-selling album of 1988 in the UK, with sales of 1.29 million copies over the course of six months. Kylie sold 1.9 million copies by the time Enjoy Yourself was released in late 1989, becoming the fifth highest-selling album of the decade—the highest by a female solo artist—in the UK. The album returned to the UK Albums Chart in 2015, when the reissue peaked at number eighty-five on 15 February. Kylie returned to the top 40 for the first time in 2023, when the 35th anniversary reissue sold 3,675 units in its first week. It was also the week's best-selling vinyl. The album was the first by a female solo artist to exceed sales of two million in the UK, selling 2,138,841 copies as of December 2023. In January 2025, it was certified seven times platinum by British Phonographic Industry.

In Minogue's native Australia, Kylie entered at number two, where it remained for three consecutive weeks. It stayed in the top fifty for a total of twenty-eight weeks. It was certified four times platinum by the Australian Recording Industry Association. In New Zealand, it debuted at number ten, and eventually topped the chart for six weeks. It is her only number-one album in the region and stayed on the charts for a total of fifty-three weeks. In November 1989, it was certified platinum by Recorded Music NZ. The album reached the top ten in Germany, Norway, and Switzerland. In the United States, it peaked at number fifty-three on the Billboard 200. This was Minogue's only charting album in the United States, until her 2001 album Fever hit the charts in 2002. In 1989, the album was certified gold in the United States, selling over 500,000 copies. Kylie was certified platinum in Hong Kong by the International Federation of the Phonographic Industry for selling over 15,000 units. In Japan, it peaked at number 30 and sold 102,000 copies as of 2006. As of 2018, Kylie has sold over five million copies worldwide.

== Accolades and impact ==
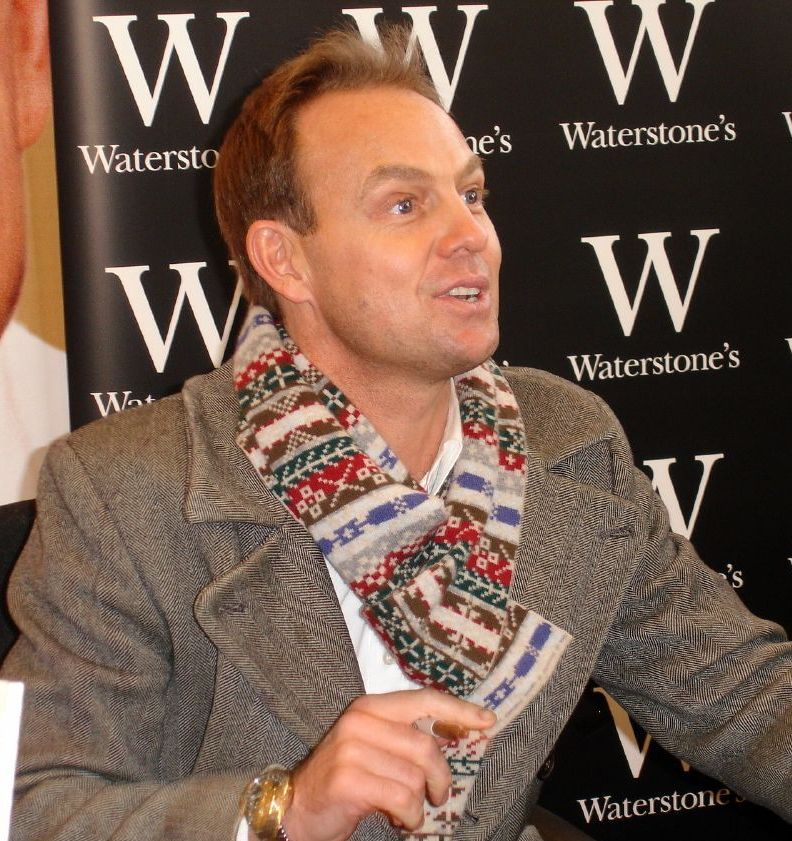
Donovan (pictured in 2007), Minogue's then-boyfriend and Neighbours co-star, pursued his singing career after being motivated by the success of Kylie.

At the ARIA Music Awards of 1988, Minogue won the Highest Selling Single for "Locomotion". At the following ceremony, she received nominations for Breakthrough Artist – Album, Highest Selling Album, and Best Female Artist for Kylie, winning the second time for Highest Selling Single for "I Should Be So Lucky" and receiving the Special Achievement Award. The single also earned Minogue a Japan Gold Disc Award for Single of the Year in 1989. It was added to the National Film and Sound Archive's Sounds of Australia registry in 2011.

The album's commercial success helped Minogue establish herself as an international teen idol and launch her recording career. Writing for Official Charts Company, Justin Myers opined "If 1988 was anyone's year it was Kylie Minogue's... She was the most exciting thing to happen to pop for quite a long time." Jim Schembri of The Guardian wrote the success of Kylie and its singles, her popular concerts in Britain and Japan, as well as her public appearances have quickly "turned [Minogue] into a pop cultural icon—as well as a multi-millionare". Guinness World Records recognised Minogue as the most successful foreign UK chart debut for Kylie; the record was later equaled by Irish boy band Boyzone in 1998.

In the US market, Kylie was a notable pop album among dozens of popular Australian rock-oriented releases in the late 1980s. Following its release, Minogue was considered as one of the most aspiring female teen pop artists, along with American singers Debbie Gibson and Tiffany. George Albert of The Sentinel viewed 1988 as a remarkable year for young female acts—he identified Minogue, Martika, Taylor Dayne, and Karyn White as a group of emerging artists who specialised in singing instead of writing music, and willing to record well-crafted contemporary pop songs that have potential on the music charts.

Music journalists attributed the album's success to Minogue's already established image as Charlene on Neighbours. She made a risky transition to music at a time when not many established actors in television chose to make a record. Motivated by the success of Kylie, Donovan pursued his singing career with SAW and signed with Mushroom Records. He recorded "Especially for You" with Minogue in late 1988, which became the fourth highest-selling single of the year, and left Neighbours the following year. Minogue went on to make three more studio albums with SAW until 1991, when Aitken left the trio. In the initial years following its release, Minogue felt detached from the album. In a late 1988 interview, she expressed: "I didn't have much say about [the album] and it doesn't sound like me. [SAW] did what they thought they had to do to deliver a hit, which they did. But the album still isn't me". However, she later found herself thoroughly enjoying the album, stating in a 2018 interview that "When I think of Kylie, I think of a really young girl. Everything was new to me."

== Track listing ==
All tracks are written by and produced by Stock Aitken Waterman, except where noted.

Kylie – Standard version
| No. | Title | Writer(s) | Length |
|---|---|---|---|
| 1. | "I Should Be So Lucky" | | 3:24 |
| 2. | "The Loco-Motion" | Gerry Goffin; Carole King | 3:15 |
| 3. | "Je ne sais pas pourquoi" | | 4:01 |
| 4. | "It's No Secret" | | 3:57 |
| 5. | "Got to Be Certain" | | 3:18 |
| 6. | "Turn It Into Love" | | 3:36 |
| 7. | "I Miss You" | | 3:15 |
| 8. | "I'll Still Be Loving You" | | 3:49 |
| 9. | "Look My Way" | | 3:36 |
| 10. | "Love at First Sight" | | 3:12 |
| Total length: | | | 35:25 |

The Kylie Collection – Side C
| No. | Title | Length |
|---|---|---|
| 1. | "I Should Be So Lucky" (Extended Mix) | 6:03 |
| 2. | "The Loco-Motion" (Kohaku Mix) | 5:55 |
| Total length: | | 11:58 |

The Kylie Collection – Side D
| No. | Title | Length |
|---|---|---|
| 1. | "I Still Love You (Je ne sais pas pourquoi)" (Moi Non Plus Mix) | 5:51 |
| 2. | "Got to Be Certain" (Extended Version) | 6:34 |
| 3. | "Made in Heaven" (Maid in Australia Mix) | 6:16 |
| Total length: | | 18:41 |

Kylie: The Videos – First version
| No. | Title | Writer(s) | Length |
|---|---|---|---|
| 1. | "Intro" | | 0:57 |
| 2. | "Locomotion" (Music video) | Goffin; King | 2:58 |
| 3. | "How Did Your Singing Career Begin?" (Interview) | | 0:21 |
| 4. | "What Goes Into Making a Video?" (Interview) | | 1:13 |
| 5. | "How Does Acting In a Drama Series Differ From Performing In a Film Clip?" (Interview) | | 0:44 |
| 6. | "I Should Be So Lucky" (Music video) | | 3:17 |
| 7. | "Credits" | | 0:40 |
| Total length: | | | 10:10 |

Kylie: The Videos – Second version
| No. | Title | Writer(s) | Length |
|---|---|---|---|
| 1. | "Intro" |
| 2. | "I Should Be So Lucky" (Music video) |
| 3. | "Interview one" |
| 4. | "Got to Be Certain" (Music video) |
| 5. | "Interview two" |
| 6. | "The Loco-Motion" (Music video) | Goffin; King |
| 7. | "Interview three" |
| 8. | "Je ne sais pas pourquoi" (Music video) |
| 9. | "Interview four" |
| 10. | "Bloopers & Credits" |
| Total length: | | | 21:37 |

The Kylie Collection – VHS version
| No. | Title | Writer(s) | Length |
|---|---|---|---|
| 1. | "I Should Be So Lucky" (Music video) | | 3:35 |
| 2. | "Got to Be Certain" (Music video) | | 3:17 |
| 3. | "The Loco-Motion" (Music video) | Goffin; King | 3:17 |
| 4. | "Je ne sais pas pourquoi" (Music video) | | 4:25 |
| 5. | "It's No Secret" (Music video) | | 4:58 |
| 6. | "Made in Heaven" (Music video) | | 3:40 |
| Total length: | | | 23:12 |

Kylie's Remixes
| No. | Title | Writer(s) | Length |
|---|---|---|---|
| 1. | "I Should Be So Lucky" (The Bicentennial Remix) | | 6:12 |
| 2. | "Got to Be Certain" (The Extra Beat Boys Remix) | | 6:52 |
| 3. | "The Loco-Motion" (The Sankie Remix) | Goffin; King | 6:36 |
| 4. | "Je ne sais pas pourquoi" (Moi Non Plus Mix) | | 5:55 |
| 5. | "Turn It Into Love" | | 3:37 |
| 6. | "It's No Secret" (Extended Version) | | 5:49 |
| 7. | "Je ne sais pas pourquoi" (The Revolutionary Mix) | | 7:16 |
| 8. | "I Should Be So Lucky" (New Remix) | | 5:33 |
| 9. | "Made in Heaven" (Made in England Mix) | | 6:19 |
| Total length: | | | 54:09 |

Kylie – 2012 Japanese reissue bonus tracks
| No. | Title | Writer(s) | Length |
|---|---|---|---|
| 11. | "Made in Heaven" | | 3:33 |
| 12. | "Getting Closer" (Extended Oz Mix) | | 4:10 |
| 13. | "I Should Be So Lucky" (The Bicentennial Mix) | | 6:11 |
| 14. | "Got to Be Certain" (Extended Version) | | 6:35 |
| 15. | "The Loco-Motion" (The Kohaku Mix) | Goffin; King | 5:59 |
| 16. | "It's No Secret" (Alternative Extended Version) | | 5:47 |
| 17. | "Je ne sais pas pourquoi" (The Revolutionary Mix) | | 7:14 |
| Total length: | | | 74:51 |

Kylie – 2015 reissue deluxe version (Disc 1)
| No. | Title | Writer(s) | Length |
|---|---|---|---|
| 11. | "Made in Heaven" | | 3:33 |
| 12. | "Locomotion" | Goffin; King | 3:16 |
| 13. | "I Should Be So Lucky" (Extended Version) | | 6:06 |
| 14. | "Got to Be Certain" (Extended Version) | | 6:35 |
| 15. | "The Loco-Motion" (The Kohaku Mix) | | 5:59 |
| 16. | "Je ne sais pas pourquoi" (Moi Non Plus Mix) | | 5:53 |
| 17. | "It's No Secret" (Extended Version) | | 5:47 |
| 18. | "Made in Heaven" (Maid in England Mix) | | 6:17 |
| Total length: | | | 78:48 |

Kylie – 2015 reissue deluxe version (Disc 2)
| No. | Title | Writer(s) | Length |
|---|---|---|---|
| 1. | "Locomotion" (Chugga Motion Mix) | Goffin; King | 7:37 |
| 2. | "Getting Closer" (Extended Oz Mix) | | 4:11 |
| 3. | "I Should Be So Lucky" (The Bicentennial Mix) | | 6:11 |
| 4. | "Got to Be Certain" (Extra Beat Boys Remix) | | 6:51 |
| 5. | "The Loco-Motion" (The Sankie Remix) | Goffin; King | 6:37 |
| 6. | "Je ne sais pas pourquoi" (The Revolutionary Mix) | | 7:15 |
| 7. | "Made in Heaven" (Original 12" Mix) | | 7:10 |
| 8. | "I Should Be So Lucky" (12" Remix) | | 5:31 |
| 9. | "The Loco-Motion" (12" Master) | Goffin; King | 9:12 |
| 10. | "Glad to Be Alive" (writers: Claude Carranza, Craig Harnath) | | 3:41 |
| 11. | "Getting Closer" (UK Mix) | | 4:02 |
| 12. | "Made in Heaven" (Heaven Scent Mix) | | 4:45 |
| 13. | "The Loco-Motion" (Oz Tour Mix) | Goffin; King | 5:40 |
| Total length: | | | 78:43 |

Kylie – 2015 reissue deluxe version (Disc 3)
| No. | Title | Writer(s) | Length |
|---|---|---|---|
| 1. | "I Should Be So Lucky" (Music video) | | 3:35 |
| 2. | "Got to Be Certain" (Music video) | | 3:17 |
| 3. | "The Loco-Motion" (Music video) | Goffin; King | 3:17 |
| 4. | "Je Ne Sais Pas Pourquoi" (Music video) | | 4:25 |
| 5. | "It's No Secret" (Music video) | | 4:58 |
| 6. | "Made in Heaven" (Music video) | | 3:40 |
| 7. | "Locomotion" (Australian version, part of the bonus footage section) | Goffin; King | 3:00 |
| 8. | "I Should Be So Lucky" (Alternative version, part of the bonus footage section) | | 3:05 |
| 9. | "Got to Be Certain" (Original version, part of the bonus footage section) | | 3:17 |
| 10. | "Got to Be Certain" (Location-only, part of the bonus footage section) | | 3:07 |
| 11. | "Interviews & Behind the Scenes" (Part of the bonus footage section) |
| 12. | "The Loco-Motion" (Live on Top of the Pops) | Goffin; King |
| 13. | "Je ne sais pas pourquoi" (Live on Top of the Pops) |

== Personnel ==
Credits adapted from the album's liner notes.

- Kylie Minogue – lead vocals, backing vocals
- Dee Lewis – backing vocals
- Mae McKenna – backing vocals
- Suzanne Rhatigan – backing vocals
- Matt Aitken – production, arrangements, keyboards, guitar
- Mike Stock – production, arrangements, backing vocals, keyboards
- Pete Waterman – production, arrangements
- George De Angelis – keyboards
- Neil Palmer – keyboards
- A. Linn – drums
- Jason Barron – engineering
- Peter Day – engineering
- Stewart Day – engineering
- Karen Hewitt – engineering
- Jonathan King – engineering
- Mark McGuire – engineering
- Burni Adams – engineering
- Yoyo – engineering
- Pete Hammond – mixing
- Jay Willis – mastering
- Lawrence Lawry – photography
- David Howells – design
- Chris Lupton – 2015 reissue design
- Ian Usher – 2015 reissue project management
- Tom Parker – 2015 reissue production
- Lino Carbosiero – hair
- Michi – makeup
- Clair Hall – styling

== Charts ==
=== Weekly charts ===
1988 chart performance for Kylie
| Chart (1988–1989) | Peak position |
|---|---|
| Australian Albums (ARIA) | 2 |
| Austrian Albums (Ö3 Austria) | 15 |
| Canada Top Albums/CDs (RPM) | 19 |
| Canada Top Albums (The Record) | 10 |
| Dutch Albums (Album Top 100) | 42 |
| European Albums (Music & Media) | 3 |
| French Albums (SNEP) | 19 |
| Finnish Albums (Suomen virallinen albumilista) | 4 |
| German Albums (Offizielle Top 100) | 8 |
| Japanese Albums (Oricon) | 30 |
| Norwegian Albums (VG-lista) | 10 |
| New Zealand Albums (RMNZ) | 1 |
| Spanish Albums (PROMUSICAE) | 45 |
| Swedish Albums (Sverigetopplistan) | 22 |
| Swiss Albums (Schweizer Hitparade) | 7 |
| UK Albums (OCC) | 1 |
| UK Independent Albums (MRIB) | 1 |
| US Billboard 200 | 53 |

2015 chart performance for Kylie
| Chart (2015) | Peak position |
|---|---|
| UK Albums (OCC) | 85 |

2023 chart performance for Kylie
| Chart (2023) | Peak position |
|---|---|
| Australian Albums (ARIA) | 40 |
| Belgian Albums (Ultratop Flanders) | 127 |
| Belgian Albums (Ultratop Wallonia) | 102 |
| Spanish Albums (Promusicae) | 74 |
| UK Albums (Official Charts) | 30 |

=== Year-end charts ===
1988 year-end chart performance for Kylie
| Charts (1988) | Position |
|---|---|
| Australian Albums (ARIA) | 17 |
| European Albums (Music & Media) | 17 |
| French Albums (SNEP) | 10 |
| German Albums (Offizielle Top 100) | 57 |
| Swiss Albums (Schweizer Hitparade) | 29 |
| New Zealand Albums (RMNZ) | 7 |
| UK Albums (OCC) | 1 |

1989 year-end chart performance for Kylie
| Chart (1989) | Position |
|---|---|
| Australian Albums (ARIA) | 95 |
| European Albums (Music & Media) | 10 |
| UK Albums (OCC) | 38 |

=== Decade-end charts ===
1980s decade-end chart performance for Kylie
| Chart (1980–89) | Position |
|---|---|
| UK Albums (OCC) | 5 |

== Certifications and sales ==
Certifications and sales for Kylie
| Region | Certification | Certified units/sales |
|---|---|---|
| Australia (ARIA) | 4× Platinum | 280,000^{^} |
| France (SNEP) | Platinum | 300,000^{*} |
| Finland (Musiikkituottajat) | Gold | 25,000 |
| Germany (BVMI) | Gold | 250,000^{^} |
| Hong Kong (IFPI Hong Kong) | Platinum | 20,000^{*} |
| Japan | — | 102,000 |
| Malaysia | — | 14,500 |
| New Zealand (RMNZ) | Platinum | 15,000^{^} |
| Switzerland (IFPI Switzerland) | Platinum | 50,000^{^} |
| United Kingdom (BPI) | 7× Platinum | 2,138,841 |
| United States (RIAA) | Gold | 500,000^{^} |
^{*} Sales figures based on certification alone.^{^} Shipments figures based on certification alone.

== Release history ==
Release dates and formats for Kylie
| Region | Date | Format(s) | Distributor(s) | Ref(s). |
|---|---|---|---|---|
| United Kingdom | 4 July 1988 | LP; cassette; CD | PWL | |
| Various | 4 July 1988 | LP; cassette; CD | PWL | |
| Japan | 4 July 1988 | LP; cassette; CD | Alfa | |
| Australia | 18 July 1988 | LP; cassette; CD | Mushroom | |
| United States | 1988 | LP; cassette; CD | Geffen | |
| Australia | 5 December 1988 | LP; cassette; VHS | Mushroom | |
| Japan | 7 November 2012 | CD; DVD; LP | PWL | |
| United Kingdom | 9 February 2015 | CD; DVD; LP | Cherry Red; PWL | |
| Japan | 10 February 2015 | CD; DVD; LP | Cherry Red; PWL | |
| Various | 24 November 2023 | LP | BMG | |

== See also ==
- List of best-selling albums of the 1980s in the United Kingdom
- List of best-selling albums by year in the United Kingdom
- List of number-one albums from the 1980s (New Zealand)
- List of Top 25 albums for 1988 in Australia
- List of UK Albums Chart number ones of the 1980s
- List of UK Independent Albums Chart number ones of the 1980s
- List of UK top-ten albums in 1988
- List of UK top-ten albums in 1989
