= Ultraviolet (Pseudo Echo album) =

Studio album by Pseudo Echo
- Released: 4 April 2014
- Studio: Metromix Studios
- Genres: Electronic music, synth pop, pop
- Label: Pseudo Echo
- Producers: Brian Canham, Dominic Messino

Pseudo Echo chronology
| Essential Pseudo Echo (2008) | Ultraviolet (2014) | Live at the Viper Room (2015) |

Singles from Ultraviolet
- 1. "Suddenly Silently" Released: July 2012; 2. "Fighting the Tide" Released: August 2012; 3. "Ultraviolet" Released: October 2014

Ultraviolet is the fourth studio album by Australian band Pseudo Echo. It was the group's first studio album since the release of Race in 1988.

== Background ==
In 2012, Pseudo Echo gathered for shows to celebrate the 30th anniversary of the release of their first single "Listening". The band agreed to record a new album. To fund recording, singer Brian Canham approached PledgeMusic to use fan-power to finance the album's recording and manufacturing. The Pseudo Echo campaign turned out to be one of the most successful take-ups for Pledgemusic generating 126% of the financial goal and guaranteeing the release of the album.

Canham said "We have been fortunate enough to have had massive support from our fans through the Pledge crowd funding. This has enabled me to be completely immersed in the writing and producing of this new album. I have reflected upon many of my life experiences over the last decade with the lyric content, and hope people will relate and connect with us."

== Reception ==
Arne Sjostedt from Sydney Morning Herald gave the album 4 1/2 of out 5 saying; "Opening with three absolute pumpers, Pseudo Echo make a bold statement of intent. This album is out to impress. And to that end, it meets its goal. The tracks on here are strong. The synth sounds, some cut and paste from Echo's heyday (with a dose of high tech steroids), cascade through each track. It is designed to keep Echo fans happy. But as an at-times forward thinking, at others reflective piece from a band that has lived through massive popularity and come out the other side, this album provides a lot to enjoy. And dance to."

== Track listing ==
All tracks written by Brian Canham, except track 9, written by Canham and Ben Grayson.

1. "Amazing Sound" – 4:55
2. "The Desert" – 5:04
3. "Things You Like" – 5:33
4. "Fathers Arms" – 4:51
5. "Ultraviolet" – 3:53
6. "Lonely" – 4:55
7. "Loosen the Rope" – 2:24
8. "Fighting the Tide" – 3:53
9. "Suddenly Silently" – 4:02
10. "Architecturally Sound" – 5:14

== Personnel ==
- Brian Canham – lead vocals, guitar, keyboards, bass guitar, synth bass
- Simon Rayner – backing vocals, keyboards, synth bass
- Darren Danielson – drums
- Ben Grayson – keyboards

== Charts ==
Chart performance for Ultraviolet
| Chart (2014) | Peak position |
|---|---|
| Australian Albums (ARIA) | 165 |
