= List of best-selling albums of the 1980s in the United Kingdom =

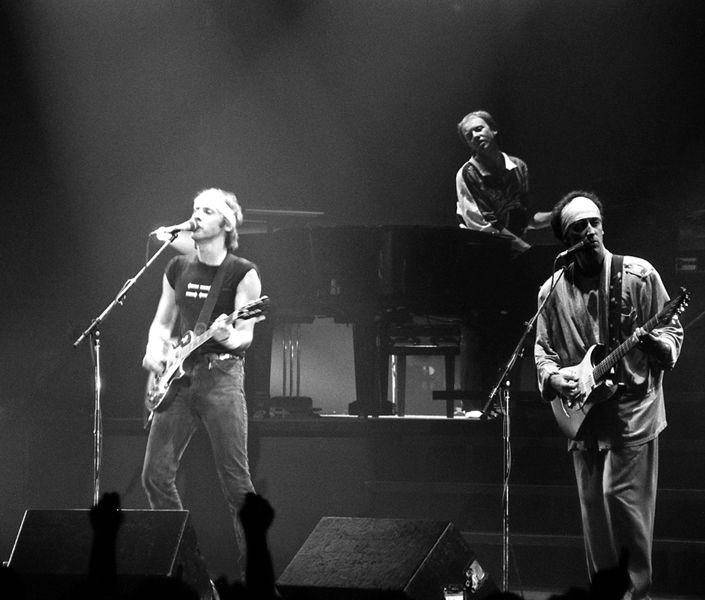
Dire Straits had the best-selling album of the 1980s in the UK with Brothers in Arms.

The UK Albums Chart is a music chart that calculates the best-selling artist albums of the week in the United Kingdom. For the purposes of inclusion in the chart an album is defined by the Official Charts Company (OCC) as being a type of music release that features more than four tracks and lasts longer than 25 minutes.

At the beginning of the 1980s, sales of singles and albums in the United Kingdom were compiled on behalf of the British music industry by the British Market Research Bureau (BMRB). This continued until the end of 1982, when the contract to compile the UK charts was won by Gallup, who took over on 4 January 1983, the first working day of 1983. Gallup continued to compile the UK charts throughout the 1980s until January 1994.

At the end of 1989 Gallup compiled the list of the best-selling singles of the 1980s, which was broadcast on BBC Radio 1, published in the music magazine Record Mirror, and published again in the book Guinness Hits of the 80s. No detailed equivalent list for the best-selling albums of the decade was produced. However, two weeks before the end of the decade, chart compiler Alan Jones published an "exclusive recap" of the top ten in his regular "Chartfile" column in Record Mirror.

The biggest-selling album of the 1980s in the UK was Brothers in Arms by Dire Straits, which had sold more than 3.2 million copies by the end of 1989. Michael Jackson had the second and third best-selling albums of the 1980s, with Bad just overtaking Thriller by the end of the decade. In fourth place was Greatest Hits by Queen, which had sold over 1.9 million copies by 1989 and went on to become the UK's biggest-selling album of all time. The highest selling album of the 1980s by a female artist was Kylie Minogue, whose self-titled debut album was the fifth highest-selling of the decade, ahead of Madonna and Whitney Houston.

== Chart ==
Best-selling albums of the 1980s in the UK
No.	Title	Artist	Record label (Note: The record labels, years and chart peaks are those given by the OCC.)	Year	Peak position
1	Brothers in Arms	Dire Straits	Vertigo	1985	1
2	Bad	Michael Jackson	Epic	1987	1
3	Thriller	Michael Jackson	Epic	1982	1
4	Greatest Hits	Queen	EMI	1981	1
5	Kylie	Kylie Minogue	PWL	1988	1
6	Whitney	Whitney Houston	Arista	1987	1
7	Tango in the Night	Fleetwood Mac	Warner Bros.	1987	1
8	No Jacket Required	Phil Collins	Virgin	1985	1
9	The Joshua Tree	U2	Island	1987	1
10	True Blue	Madonna	Sire	1986	1
