= Osvaldo Rodríguez (Cuban musician) =

Cuban musician

Osvaldo Rodríguez (born 9 June 1949) is a Cuban musician.

== Career ==
In Cuba, he was director and founder of the Voces del Trópico quartet and the Los 5-U4 group, which gained national recognition. He later became a solo artist, eventually going on a world tour. He has recorded five LPs and numerous singles.

In his home country, he was awarded a "Distinction For Cuban Culture" and won three Gold Records from the Enterprise For Musical Recordings and Publications (EGREM). In 1979 and 1983 he won the popularity prize in the Cuban Adolfo Guzmán music contest.

He has visited Venezuela, Nicaragua and Chile. In May 1982 he went on tour to California in the United States, appearing in San Francisco, Bellegrade, Oakland and Palo Alto. He has also performed in Poland, Germany, the Soviet Union, and Japan.

Rodriguez is also an arranger and guitar player.

== Awards ==
- "Grand Prize" at the "Red Hammer" festival of songs in Sochi in the former Soviet Union, featuring singers from socialist countries and some guests from western countries.
- "Special Prize" from Polish radio and television at the 1980 Sopot International Song Festival.
- The "Gold Tap" at the song festival in Rostock, East Germany, in 1981. Rostock held a festival of popular music, where artists from socialist countries and singers from the West participated.
- "Grand Prize" at the "Yamaha" World Popular Song Festival held in Tokyo, Japan, in 1981. Rodriguez beat the North American duo Peaches and Herb and Hollywood actress and singer Maria Conchita Alonso.
- Finalist in the Viña del Mar International Song Festival in Chile in 1992.
- Finalist in the OTI Festival in November 1994 in Valencia, Spain, organized by the Organization of Latin-American Television, the final of a series of national televised song contests organized by the national member channels of the Organization, in all the countries of America, Spain, and Portugal.
