= It's No Secret (Kylie Minogue song) =

1988 single by Kylie Minogue

- Artwork for the Australian/New Zealand single

Single by Kylie Minogue

from the album Kylie
- B-side: "Look My Way"; "Made in Heaven"
- Released: 15 December 1988
- Studio: PWL (London)
- Genre: Pop
- Length: 3:55 (LP version); 3:32 (7" version)
- Label: PWL; Mushroom; Geffen
- Songwriter(s): Mike Stock; Matt Aitken; Pete Waterman
- Producer(s): Stock Aitken Waterman

Kylie Minogue singles chronology
"Especially for You" (1988)	"It's No Secret" (1988)	"Turn It into Love" (1988)

Music video
- "It's No Secret" on YouTube

"It's No Secret" is a song by Australian singer-songwriter Kylie Minogue taken from her debut studio album Kylie (1988). The song was written and produced by Stock, Aitken and Waterman, who were also the producers of Minogue's first four studio albums. The song was intended to be released as the fifth single from Kylie, but due to the success and longevity of Kylie's massive selling duet with Jason Donovan, "Especially for You", over Christmas 1988 and the following new year, it was only released in a handful of countries. In the United States, "It's No Secret" was released as Kylie's third single where it reached the top 40 of the Billboard Hot 100.

== Background ==
Originally scheduled to be released worldwide, "It's No Secret" was cancelled in most territories in favour of "Hand on Your Heart", a brand new track, which was released in April 1989 and was the first to be released from her second album Enjoy Yourself. Eventually, the song was only released in USA, New Zealand, Canada and Japan. A still from the video of "It's No Secret" was used as the cover of the "Hand on Your Heart" CD and cassette in the UK, while the track itself was also used as the B-side to its follow-up, "Wouldn't Change a Thing" which was released in July 1989.

Due to its limited release and therefore, no promotion, the song was not a huge commercial success, but it did well enough to promote its parent album Kylie from which it was released. "It's No Secret" debuted at number 47 on the New Zealand Singles Chart, where it only peaked for a sole week. In February 1989, the song climbed to number 37 on the US Billboard Hot 100, managing to peak inside the Top 40. In total, the song spent a total of thirteen weeks in the Hot 100, making the song one of Kylie's longest-running singles on the chart.

An accompanying music video was shot for the single in Port Douglas, Australia. It features a vague storyline with Minogue having an argument with her boyfriend because he keeps taking money from her and she eventually finds out he's also interested in another girl. She walks around reflecting on her unhappy relationship until she eventually finishes with him. The final scene is of Minogue walking blissfully down a train track, a single woman once again. The video to "It's No Secret" opens Minogue's second official video collection, Kylie: The Videos 2, which was released in the UK and Australia in November 1989 and was a big seller. Minogue promoted "It's No Secret", performing it on Live at the Hippodrome, a UK television show, and in a rare all-live with band US appearance on The Arsenio Hall Show and Club MTV.

== Chart performance ==
"It's No Secret" debuted at number 47 on the New Zealand Singles Chart, where it peaked for one week, which is Minogue's worst performing single in New Zealand. In December 1988, the song debuted at number 90 on the U.S. Billboard Hot 100, managing to peak at number 37 in February 1989. In total, the song spent a total of thirteen weeks in the Hot 100, making the song one of Minogue's longest-spanning single on the chart itself.

== Critical reception ==
In 2023, Robert Moran of Australian daily tabloid newspaper The Sydney Morning Herald ranked the song as Minogue's 171st song (out of 183), deeming that "[Minogue]'s yelling rather than singing (over the highest-pitched funk guitar you've ever heard)".

== Music video ==
The clip was shot in Port Douglas, Queensland. It starts with Kylie behind the counter of a diner, her boyfriend asking for money, she later sees him with another girl and walks out. Next she alights off a train and she is seen walking down a train track amongst the cane fields in a strapless top and jeans, arriving at a beach house, singing to a photo of her ex-boyfriend, sitting beside a waterfall, arriving poolside in a dress at Mirage resort Port Douglas and lastly on the beach.

== Formats and track listings ==
These are the formats and track listings of major single releases of "It's No Secret".

North America 7" vinyl single and cassette single

1. "It's No Secret" – 3:55
2. "Made in Heaven" – 3:20

North American 12" vinyl single

1. "It's No Secret" (Extended) – 5:46
2. "Made in Heaven" (Maid in England mix) – 6:16

Japanese 7" vinyl single

1. "It's No Secret" – 3:55
2. "Look My Way" – 3:35

Japanese 3" CD single

1. "It's No Secret" – 3:55
2. "Look My Way" – 3:35

Japanese 12" vinyl single

1. "It's No Secret" (Extended) – 5:46
2. "The Loco-Motion" (Sankie Mix - long version) – 6:54

New Zealand 7" single

1. "It's No Secret" – 3:32
2. "It's No Secret" (Instrumental) – 3:32

Australian 12" single

1. "It's No Secret" (Extended) – 5:46
2. "It's No Secret" (Instrumental) – 3:32

iTunes digital download EP

1. "It's No Secret" (7" Mix) – 3:32
2. "It's No Secret" (Extended Version) - 5:46
3. "It's No Secret" (Alternative Extended Version) - 5:27
4. "It's No Secret" (7" Instrumental) - 3:30
5. "It's No Secret" (7" Backing Track) - 3:30
6. "It's No Secret" (Album Instrumental) 3:56
7. "It's No Secret" (Album Backing Track) 3:57
8. "Look My Way" (Instrumental) - 3:36
9. "Look My Way" (Backing Track) - 3:36

== Charts ==
Chart (1989)	Peak position
New Zealand (Recorded Music NZ)	47
Quebec (ADISQ)	18
US Billboard Hot 100	37
US Contemporary Hit Radio (Radio & Records)	32
U.S. Cashbox Charts	32
