= Race (Pseudo Echo album) =

Studio album by Pseudo Echo
- Released: 29 December 1988
- Recorded: Metropolis Studios, Melbourne
- Genre: Hard rock
- Length: 40:30
- Label: EMI Australia; RCA (US)
- Producer: Brian Canham, Julian Mendelsohn

Pseudo Echo chronology
Long Plays 83–87 (1987)	Race (1988)	Best Adventures (1995)

Singles from Race
- 1. "Take on the World" Released: October 1987; 2. "Fooled Again" Released: November 1988; 3. "Over Tomorrow" Released: February 1989; 4. "Eye of the Storm" Released: July 1989

Alternative cover
- International version

Race is the third studio album released by Australian new wave band Pseudo Echo. It was released via EMI Australia in 1988 and RCA Records internationally in 1989. Race resulted in a musical change for the group as it mirrored the music landscape at the time; dominated by big hair, big guitars and rock. While the album no doubt alienated the majority of the band's fan base, it equally attracted a new breed of rock loving fans.

The album included their track "Take On the World", which won at 1987 World Popular Song Festival (a.k.a. Yamaha Music Festival) in Japan.

Three singles were released from the album. The first, "Fooled Again" (which had "Take On the World" as a B-side), peaked at No. 32 in Australia in late 1988.

== Reviews ==
AllMusic gave the album 3 out of 5 stars.

Reviewer "The Doctor" of alltime-records.com gave the album 2 & 1/2 out of 7 stars, saying: "Pseudo Echo’s third album came when their fame was fading and facing this reality, they attempted to change their image and style, becoming a hard rock band. What resulted was Race, an album that was a flop both commercially and critically. With the constant sound of crunching and whining guitars, this is a record of corny, pretentious songs."

== Track listings ==
CD

No.	Title	Writer(s)	Length
1.	"Fooled Again"	James Leigh, Vince Leigh	4:39
2.	"Over Tomorrow"	Brian Canham, James Leigh	5:05
3.	"Caught"	Brian Canham, Vince Leigh	4:33
4.	"Imagination"	James Leigh, Vince Leigh	4:05
5.	"Don't You Forget"	Brian Canham	4:15
6.	"Runaways"	Brian Canham, Pierre Gigliotti	3:16
7.	"Searching for a Glory"	Brian Canham, James Leigh, Vince Leigh	5:10
8.	"Take on the World"	Brian Canham, Vince Leigh	3:45
9.	"Metropolis"	Brian Canham	1:50
10.	"Eye of the Storm"	Brian Canham	3:52

== Weekly charts ==
Chart (1988–89)	Peak position
Australian Kent Music Report Albums Chart	18
Australian ARIA Albums Chart	32

== Personnel ==
- Brian Canham – lead vocals and backing vocals, electric guitars
- Pierre Gigliotti – bass and backing vocals
- James Leigh – synthesizers, sampler, electric piano and backing vocals
- Vince Leigh – drums and backing vocals
