= World Popular Song Festival =

International song competition

World Popular Song Festival (Yamaha Music Festival)
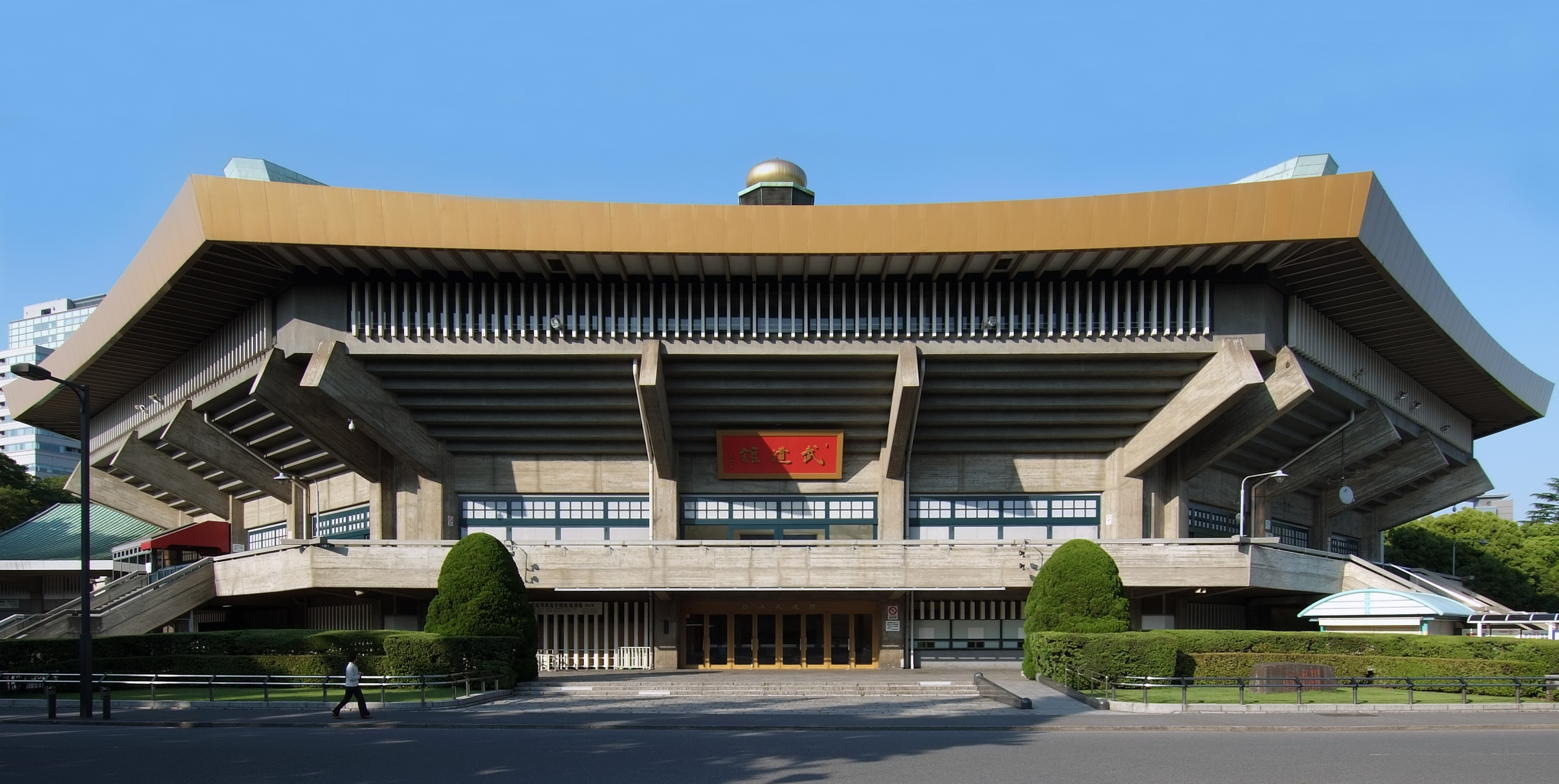
- Genre: Rock music,
- Locations: Tokyo, Japan
- Years active: 1970–1989
- Founders: Yamaha Music Foundation
- Website: Official Site by Yamaha Music Foundation

The World Popular Song Festival (世界歌謡祭, Sekai Kayōsai), also known as Yamaha Music Festival and unofficially as the "Oriental Eurovision", was an international song contest held from 1970 until 1989. It was organised by the Yamaha Music Foundation in Tokyo, Japan. The contest consisted of two semi-finals and one Grand Final.

The first edition of the World Popular Song Festival (WPSF) took place on the 20th, 21st and 22nd of November 1970 with 37 participating countries. In 1988, the concert was cancelled due to the illness of the Shōwa Emperor. The final festival in 1989 was charity concert for UNICEF.

== History ==
Daliah Lavi represented Belgium in the1970 edition. Lavi was famous for her role in Casino Royale (1967), the James Bond parody featuring Woody Allen as well as Samantha Gilles in 1987 ending second with the song Hold Me. Lavi performed the chanson "Prends L'Amour" and finished 13th in the Grand Final. The Netherlands nominated world-known jazz singer Rita Reys with the song "Just Be You" composed by her husband Pim Jacobs. Czech singer Helena Vondráčková sang "Uncle Charlie", a novelty song inspired by Charlie Chaplin. Other famous 1970 participants were 1969 Eurovision winner Frida Boccara for France, Jacques Michel for Canada and Ted Mulry for Australia, who scored a national number 1 hit with his entry. Winner of the 1st WPSF was Israel with the duo Hedva and David. Over a million copies of the Japanese version ナオミの夢 "Naomi no Yume" of their winning entry I Dream of Naomi were sold worldwide, adding credibility to the new Festival.

New talents also participated at the WPSF: for example, Björn & Benny, now known as ABBA, performed the track "Santa Rosa". Additional upcoming artists included Céline Dion (Outstanding Song Award in 1982), Bryan Adams (Participating in 1982), Bucks Fizz (Best Song Award in 1981), Tina Charles, Eros Ramazzotti, Daniela Romo, Gianna Nannini, Demis Roussos, Bonnie Tyler, B.J. Thomas, La Toya Jackson (Outstanding Song Award in 1986), Erasure, Cissy Houston, Italian singer-songwriter Alice, Mia Martini and more.

In the history of the WPSF, the United Kingdom has been the most successful, winning the "WPSF Grand Prix" three times consecutively and five times total in the 1970s. The United Kingdom is followed by the United States with 4 Grand Prix victories. Smaller countries won as well: Jamaica in 1972 with Ernie Smith, Norway in 1974 with Ellen Nikolaysen, Cuba in 1981 with Osvaldo Rodríguez and Hungary in 1983 with Neoton Família.

=== Grand Prix Winners ===
Year	Country	Artist	Title
1970	Israel	Hedva & David	"Ani Holem Al Naomi"
1971	France	Martine Clémenceau	"Un Jour l'Amour"
	Japan	Tsunehiko Kamijo & Rokumonsen	"Tabidachi No Uta"
1972	United Kingdom	Capricorn	"Feeling"
	Jamaica	Ernie Smith	"Life is Just for Livin'"
1973	Italy	Gilda Giuliani	"Parigi a Volte Cosa Fa"
	United States	Shawn Phillips	"All the Kings and Castles"
	United Kingdom	Keeley Ford	"Head over Heels"
	Japan	Akiko Kosaka	"Anata (You)"
1974	Norway	Ellen Nikolaysen	"You Made Me Feel I Could Fly"
1975	Mexico	Mister Loco	"Lucky Man"
	Japan	Miyuki Nakajima	"Jidai (Time Goes Around)"
1976	Italy	Franco & Regina	"Amore Mio"
	Japan	Sandy	"Goodbye Morning"
1977	United Kingdom	Rags	"Can't Hide My Love"
	Japan	Masanori Sera and Twist	"Anta no Ballade"
1978	United Kingdom	Tina Charles	"Love Rocks"
	Japan	Hiroshi Madoka	"Musoubana (Fly on All the Way)"
1979	United Kingdom	Bonnie Tyler	"Sitting on the Edge of the Ocean"
	Japan	Crystal King	"Daitokai (In the City of Strangers)"
1980	United States	Mary MacGregor	"What's The Use"
1981	Cuba	Osvaldo Rodríguez	"Digamos Que Mas Da"
1982	United States	Anne Bertucci	"Where Did We Go Wrong"
	Japan	Asuka	"Hananusubito"
1983	Hungary	Neoton Família	"Time Goes By"
1984	Canada	France Joli	"Party Lights"
1985	Argentina	Valeria Lynch	"Rompecabezas"
1986	United States	Stacy Lattisaw	"Longshot"
1987	Australia	Pseudo Echo	"Take on the World"
1988		(the contest was cancelled)	
1989	UNICEF Charity Concert	Stevie Wonder, Bonnie Tyler, B. J. Thomas, Dan Hill, Pseudo Echo	"Parents of the World"

== Awards ==
- Grand Prix International
- Grand Prix National 1975-1982
- Most Outstanding Performance Award (MOPA)
- Outstanding Performance Award (OPA)
- Outstanding Song Award (OSA)
- Kawakami Award

== See also ==
- List of historic rock festivals
