= Love an Adventure =

Studio album by Pseudo Echo
- Released: 1985
- Recorded: 1985
- Genre: Dance-rock
- Length: 42:35
- Label: EMI Australia
- Producers: Mark Berry; Brian Canham

Pseudo Echo chronology
Autumnal Park (1984)	Love an Adventure (1985)	Long Plays 83–87 (1987)

Singles from Love an Adventure
- 1. "Don’t Go" Released: October 1985; 2. "Love an Adventure" Released: January 1986; 3. "Living in a Dream" Released: April 1986; 4. "Try" Released: September 1986; 5. "Funky Town" Released: 17 November 1986

Alternative cover
- North American / European version

Love an Adventure is the second studio album by Australian new wave band Pseudo Echo, released in 1985 by EMI Australia. The album peaked at No. 14 in Australia and produced three Australian top twenty singles, including "Don’t Go", which peaked at No. 4. In 1986, the album was reissued to include the hit single "Funky Town".

In 1987, the album was released for the first time in North America with an alternate track listing, replacing three tracks on the original Australian release with re-recordings of three tracks originally featured on their previous album (making it a compilation of sorts). While not included on initial pressings of the North American version, "Funky Town" was quickly added to later editions, replacing a fourth track ("Don't Go") from the Australian version.

== Background ==
Following the success of Autumnal Park, Pseudo Echo returned to the studio in 1985, with an altered line up. Tony Lugton and Anthony Argiro both left and joined other bands (though Argiro is credited as drummer on the original release). They were replaced by brothers James Leigh and Vince Leigh (aka Vincent Dingli).

== Critical reception ==
In a retrospective review for AllMusic, critic Michael Sutton gave the album 4 out of 5 stars, and wrote of the album, "Their cover of Lipps Inc.'s ‘’Funkytown’’ was sadly misrepresentative of the album's stylish, hook-loaded dance rock. Pseudo Echo want people to move their feet and this album is stocked with dancefloor scorchers such as "Living in a Dream", "Listening" and the funky "Try". "Funkytown" may have given Pseudo Echo a glimpse of commercial success, but the rest of Love an Adventure proved that they were capable of more."

== Track listing ==
Love an Adventure – 1985 Australian release
No.	Title	Writer(s)	Length
1.	"Love an Adventure"	Brian Canham	4:14
2.	"Don’t Go"	Canham; James Leigh	3:53
3.	"Try"	Canham; James Leigh	4:16
4.	"I Will Be You"	Canham; Anthony Argiro	5:26
5.	"Girl"	James Leigh	3:14
6.	"Living in a Dream"	Canham	3:24
7.	"I Ask You Why"	Canham; James Leigh; Argiro	3:52
8.	"Lonely Without You"	Canham; James Leigh	4:33
9.	"Lies Are Nothing"	Canham; James Leigh	3:55
10.	"Tell Me"	Canham; James Leigh; Vince Leigh	3:14

Love an Adventure – 1986 Australian reissue
No.	Title	Writer(s)	Length
6.	"Funky Town (Dance Mix)"	Steven Greenberg	6:35
7.	"Living in a Dream"	Canham	3:24
8.	"I Ask You Why"	Canham; James Leigh; Argiro	3:52
9.	"Lonely Without You"	Canham; James Leigh	4:33
10.	"Lies Are Nothing"	Canham; James Leigh	3:55
11.	"Tell Me"	Canham; James Leigh; Vince Leigh	3:14

Love an Adventure – 1987 international release
No.	Title	Writer(s)	Length
1.	"A Beat for You"	Canham	3:42
2.	"Living in a Dream"	Canham	3:31
3.	"Try"	Canham; James Leigh	4:16
4.	"Listening"	Canham; Tony Lugton	3:05
5.	"I Will Be You"	Canham; Argiro	5:25
6.	"Love an Adventure"	Canham	4:19
7.	"Destination Unknown"	Canham; Pierre Gigliotti	4:59
8.	"Don't Go"	Canham; James Leigh	3:53
9.	"Lonely Without You"	Canham; James Leigh	4:33
10.	"Lies Are Nothing"	Canham; James Leigh	3:55

Love an Adventure – 1987 international reissue
No.	Title	Writer(s)	Length
8.	"Funky Town"	Steven Greenberg	4:54
9.	"Lonely Without You"	Canham; James Leigh	4:33
10.	"Lies Are Nothing"	Canham; James Leigh	3:55

== Chart positions ==
=== Weekly charts ===
Chart (1985–87)	Peak position
Australian Kent Music Report Albums Chart	14
Canada Top Albums/CDs (RPM)	22
Sweden Sverigetopplistan Albums Chart	21
US Billboard 200 Albums Chart	57

== Certifications ==
Region	Certification	Certified units/sales
Australia (ARIA)	Platinum	70,000^{^}
Canada (Music Canada)	Gold	50,000^{^}
^{^} Shipments figures based on certification alone.

== Personnel ==
Pseudo Echo (as listed in North American release)

- Brian Canham – lead and backing vocals, electric guitars
- Pierre Gigliotti – synthesizer, bass guitar, backing vocals (Note: The original 1985 Australasian release lists Pierre as having performed only "bass synth", while non-group member Joe Creighton is credited with playing all bass guitars.)
- James Leigh – keyboards, synthesizers, drum machine, sequencer, backing vocals
- Vince Leigh – acoustic drums, electronic drums, backing vocals (listed on North American (1987) version only) (Note: Vince Leigh's predecessor in the band, Anthony Argiro is credited (and pictured) as drummer on the original 1985 release. Given that there is overlap between tracks featured on the original and the 1987 release, it is unclear which tracks feature Argiro and which feature Leigh.)

Additional musicians (listed in liner notes for original Australasian version only) (Note: Although none of these additional musicians/vocalists are credited on the North American version of the album, it is likely that at least some of them are featured on both versions, as - for example - certain brass instruments are clearly audible on such songs as the title track ("Love an Adventure") on the American release.)

- Alex Pertout – percussions
- James Valentine – saxophone
- Greg Flood – trombone
- Bob Venier, Peter Salt – trumpets
- Joe Creighton - fretted and fretless bass guitars
- Kate Ceberano, Venetta Fields - backing vocals

Additional musician on North American version

- Brian Drago - backing vocals on "Listening"
