= Over Tomorrow =

Single by Pseudo Echo

from the album Race
- Released: February 1989
- Studio: Metropolis Audio
- Genre: Pop
- Length: 5:05
- Label: EMI Music
- Songwriter(s): Brian Canham and James Leigh
- Producer(s): Brian Canham, Julian Mendelsohn

Pseudo Echo singles chronology
"Fooled Again" (1988)	"Over Tomorrow" (1989)	"Eye of the Storm" (1989)

"Over Tomorrow" is a song by Australian pop group Pseudo Echo. It was released in February 1989 as the second single from the band's third studio album, Race. The song peaked at number 40 on the ARIA Charts.

== Track listing ==
7" (EMI 2198)

- Side A "Over Tomorrow"
- Side B "Wings"

CD single (CDED 400)

1. "Over Tomorrow"
2. "Nothing to Say"
3. "Wings"

== Charts ==
Chart (1989)	Peak position
Australia (ARIA)	40
