= Autumnal Park =

Studio album by Pseudo Echo
- Released: June 1, 1984
- Recorded: 1983
- Genre: Electronic; rock; synth-pop; new wave
- Length: 41:29
- Label: EMI Australia
- Producer: John Punter & Peter Dawkins

Pseudo Echo chronology
Autumnal Park (1984)	Love an Adventure (1986)

Singles from Pseudo Echo
- 1. "Listening" Released: November 1983; 2. "A Beat for You" Released: April 1984; 3. "Dancing Until Midnight" Released: June 1984; 4. "Stranger in Me" Released: November 1984

Alternative cover
- North American version

Autumnal Park is the debut studio album by Australian new wave band Pseudo Echo. Autumnal Park peaked at No. 11 in Australia and produced two Top 20 singles, including "Listening", which peaked at No. 4 in Australia. It was released in North America under the title, Pseudo Echo.

At the 1984 Countdown Music Awards, the album was nominated for Best Debut Album.

== Background ==
Pseudo Echo was formed in 1982 in Melbourne by school friends Brian Canham and Pierre Gigliotti, joining Anthony Argiro and Tony Lugton. They played around Melbourne and were discovered by Molly Meldrum, a television presenter for the pop-music series Countdown. Meldrum convinced them to perform on the show, on which they performed a demo version of "Listening" in June 1983. Shortly after, they were signed to EMI Australia and "Listening" reached No. 4. Autumnal Park was released in June 1984.

== Reviews ==
AllMusic gave the album 4.5/5 stars; reviewer Michael Sutton said: "Pseudo Echo hit the jackpot, finding mercilessly catchy grooves and then running with it. These tracks explode from the speakers with breathless energy, bombarding the listener with rapid-fire hooks. The lyrics lack depth, but they aren't intended for in-depth analysis. The songs are made for dancing, and Pseudo Echo approach every track with unyielding enthusiasm. Pseudo Echo is a sadly underappreciated effort, usually dismissed by critics unable to feel the warmth beneath the group's jubilant, synthesized pop."

== Track listing ==
Vinyl/cassette

Side A
No.	Title	Writer(s)	Length
1.	"A Beat for You"	Pseudo Echo	3:41
2.	"See Through"	Pseudo Echo	3:29
3.	"From The Shore"	Pseudo Echo	4:46
4.	"Stranger in Me"	Pseudo Echo	4:19
5.	"Dancing Until Midnight"	Pseudo Echo	4:22

Side B
No.	Title	Writer(s)	Length
1.	"Listening"	Brian Canham, Tony Lugton	2:57
2.	"His Eyes"	Pseudo Echo	4:36
3.	"Walkaway"	Pseudo Echo	3:51
4.	"Fast Cars"	Pseudo Echo	4:23
5.	"Destination Unknown"	Pseudo Echo	4:58

CD release (2005)

No.	Title	Writer(s)	Length
1.	"Autumnal Park"	Tony Lugton	4:10
2.	"A Beat for You"	Brian Canham	3:40
3.	"See Through"	B. Canham, Pierre Pierre	3:30
4.	"From The Shore"	P. Pierre	4:46
5.	"Stranger in Me"	B. Canham	4:22
6.	"Dancing Until Midnight"	B. Canham, Tony Lugton	4:23
7.	"Listening"	B. Canham, T. Lugton	2:56
8.	"His Eyes"	B. Canham, T. Lugton	4:37
9.	"Walk Away"	B. Canham, T. Lugton	3:51
10.	"Fast Cars"	B. Canham, P. Pierre	4:23
11.	"Destination Unknown"	B. Canham, P. Pierre, Frank Scalzo	4:57
12.	"In Their Time"	B. Canham, T. Lugton	5:42
13.	"Turning Pages"	B. Canham	4:47
14.	"Scripts"	P. Pierre	3:22

- Tracks 1 & 12-14 are bonus tracks.

== Charts ==
Chart (1984)	Peak position
Australian Kent Music Report Albums Chart	11
New Zealand RIANZ Albums Chart	14

== Personnel ==
- Pierre Pierre - bass, keyboards, vocals
- Anthony Johan Argiro - drums, percussion
- Tony Lugton - keyboards, vocals
- Brian Canham - vocals, guitar, keyboards

Technical

- Glen Phimister - engineer
- Guy Gray, Jim Taig, Peter Cobbin - sound effects
