= Try (Pseudo Echo song) =

Single by Pseudo Echo

from the album Love an Adventure
- Released: September 1986
- Recorded: Platinum Studios, Melbourne
- Length: 4:16
- Label: EMI Music
- Songwriter(s): Brian Canham, James Leigh
- Producer(s): Mark Barry

Pseudo Echo singles chronology
"Living in a Dream" (1986)	"Try" (1986)	"Funky Town" (1986)

"Try" is a song by Australian pop group Pseudo Echo. The song was released in September 1986 as the fourth and final single from the Australian release of their second studio album, Love an Adventure (1985). The song peaked at number 60 on the Australian Kent Music Report.

== Track listings ==
7" (EMI-1807)

- Side A "Try" - 4:16
- Side B "Lonely Without You" - 4:33

== Charts ==
Chart (1986)	Peak position
Australian Kent Music Report	60
