= Stranger in Me =

Single by Pseudo Echo

from the album Autumnal Park
- Released: November 1984
- Recorded: Studios 301, Sydney
- Genre: Pop; synth-pop
- Length: 4:19
- Label: EMI Music
- Songwriter(s): Brian Canham
- Producer(s): John Punter

Pseudo Echo singles chronology
"Dancing Until Midnight" (1984)	"Stranger in Me" (1984)	"Don't Go" (1985)

"Stranger in Me" is a song by Australian pop group Pseudo Echo. The song was released in November 1984 as the fourth and final single from their debut studio album, Autumnal Park (1984). The song peaked at number 58 on the Australian Kent Music Report in December 1984.

== Track listing ==
7" (EMI-1390)

- Side A "Stranger in Me" - 4:19
- Side B "Turning The Pages" - 4:50

12" (EMI - ED 96)

- Side A "Stranger in Me" - 6:04
- Side A "Listening" - 5:35
- Side B "Stranger in Me" (Instrumental) - 5:33
- Side B "Destination Unknown" - 5:48

== Charts ==
Chart (1984)	Peak position
Australian Kent Music Report	58
