= Fooled Again (song) =

Single by Pseudo Echo

from the album Race
- Released: November 1988
- Studio: Metropolis Audio
- Genre: Pop
- Length: 3:58
- Label: EMI Music
- Songwriters: James Leigh and Vince Leigh
- Producers: Brian Canham, Julian Mendelsohn

Pseudo Echo singles chronology
"Take On the World" (1987)	"Fooled Again" (1988)	"Over Tomorrow" (1989)

"Fooled Again" is a song by Australian pop group Pseudo Echo. It was released in November 1988 as the lead single from the band's third studio album, Race. The song peaked at number 33 on the ARIA Charts.

== Track listing ==
7" (EMI 2121)

- Side A "Fooled Again" – 3:58
- Side B "Take On the World" – 3:46

CD single (CDED 385)

1. "Fooled Again"
2. "Take On The World"
3. "Runaways"

== Charts ==
Chart (1988)	Peak position
Australia (ARIA)	33
