= Take On the World (Pseudo Echo song) =

Single by Pseudo Echo

from the album Race
- Released: October 1987 (Japan)
- Length: 3:40
- Label: RCA Records
- Songwriters: Brian Canham and Vince Leigh
- Producers: Brian Canham, Julian Mendelsohn, Brian Malouf

Pseudo Echo singles chronology
"Funky Town" (1986)	"Take On the World" (1987)	"Fooled Again" (1988)

"Take On the World" is a song by Australian pop group Pseudo Echo.

The song entered and won the 1987 World Popular Song Festival (aka Yamaha Music Festival) in Japan.

The song was released in Japan only in October 1987. It was included on the group's third studio album, Race (1988).

== Track listing ==
7″ (RCA: RPS-252)

- Side A "Take On the World" – 3:40
- Side B "Lonely Without You" – 4:34
