= Living in a Dream (Pseudo Echo song) =

Single by Pseudo Echo

from the album Love an Adventure
- Released: April 1986
- Recorded: Platinum Studios, Melbourne
- Genre: Pop
- Length: 3:24
- Label: EMI Music, RCA
- Songwriter(s): Brian Canham
- Producer(s): Mark Barry

Pseudo Echo singles chronology
"Love an Adventure" (1986)	"Living in a Dream" (1986)	"Try" (1986)

Audio
- "Living in a Dream" on YouTube

"Living in a Dream" is a song by Australian pop group Pseudo Echo. The song was released in April 1986 as the third single from their second studio album, Love an Adventure (1985). The song peaked at number 15 on the Australian Kent Music Report and number 57 on the US Billboard Hot 100 in 1987.

== Formats and track listings ==
7" (EMI-1729)

- Side A "Living in a Dream" – 3:24
- Side B "Loose Ends" – 2:28

12" (EMI – ED 190)

- Side A "Living in a Dream" (Metal Mix) – 5:39
- Side B "Living in a Dream" – 3:24
- Side B "Loose Ends" – 2:28

US 7" (RCA 5125-7-R)

- Side A "Living in a Dream" – 3:24
- Side B "Don't Go" – 3:54

European Maxi Single (RCA 49754)

1. "Living in a Dream" (Oz Mix) – 5:39
2. "Living in a Dream" – 3:25
3. "Living in a Dream" (Dance Mix) – 5:20
4. "Don't Go" – 3:54

== Charts ==
Chart (1986–87)	Peak position
Australian Kent Music Report	15
US Billboard Hot 100	57
