= Pseudo Echo =

Australian new wave band from Melbourne

- Pseudo Echo performing in August 2026

Background information
- Origin: Melbourne, Victoria, Australia
- Genres: New wave; synth-pop; pop rock; electronic rock
- Years active: 1982–1990; 1998–present
- Labels: RCA; EMI; Colossal; Independent
- Spinoffs: Invertigo
- Members: Brian Canham; Valentina Taylor; Andrea Krakovská; Danny Ammar; Elliott Orban; Michael Kasif
- Past members: Tony Lugton; Pierre Gigliotti; Anthony Argiro; James Leigh; Vince Leigh; (See Pseudo Echo's former members for others)

Pseudo Echo are an Australian new wave band formed in 1982 by Brian Canham (vocals, guitar, and keyboards), Pierre Gigliotti (bass keyboards and bass guitar), and Tony Lugton (keyboards). Later members included Anthony Argiro (drums), Vince Leigh (drums), and James Leigh (keyboards). In the 1980s, Pseudo Echo had multiple Australian top 20 hits with "Listening", "A Beat for You", "Don't Go", "Love an Adventure", and "Living in a Dream". Their 1986 cover of "Funkytown" (a 1980 disco hit by Lipps Inc.) was an international success, peaking at No. 1 in Australia and New Zealand and becoming a top ten hit in Sweden, Canada, the United States, and in the United Kingdom.

Their 1984 debut album, Autumnal Park, peaked at No. 11 on the Australian Kent Music Report. Love an Adventure followed in 1985 and reached No. 14. Their third album, Race (1988), peaked at No. 18. In 1990, the group disbanded. They reformed in 1998 and released the albums Ultraviolet (2014), Acoustica, and After Party (both 2020). Australian rock music historian Ian McFarlane described the band as "combin[ing] flash clothes, blow-wave hairstyles, youthful exuberance and accessible synth-pop to arrive at a winning combination".

== Biography ==
=== 1982–1984: Formation and Autumnal Park ===
Pseudo Echo was formed in Melbourne in 1982 by two high school friends Brian Canham on vocals, guitars, and keyboards, and Pierre Gigliotti (as Pierre Pierre) on bass guitar and keyboards. They were later joined by Tony Lugton (ex-Steeler, James Freud & the Radio Stars) on guitars and keyboards. The group were named for a sound effect available on their keyboards and were initially influenced by New Romantics bands, Duran Duran, Spandau Ballet, and Ultravox. Molly Meldrum, television presenter and talent co-ordinator for the pop music series Countdown, saw the group at a gig and aired them on his show with a demo version of "Listening" in June 1983. Originally the three-piece group had used a drum machine until Anthony Argiro joined on drums in July.

The band were signed to EMI Records and "Listening" – re-recorded and produced by Peter Dawkins – was issued in November as their debut single. It peaked at No. 4 on the Australian Kent Music Report Singles Chart. Their debut album, Autumnal Park, produced by Dawkins and John Punter, was released in June 1984 and peaked at No. 11 on the Kent Music Report Albums Chart. The album was released as Pseudo Echo for the North American market. It yielded the singles "A Beat for You" (No. 12 in April), "Dancing Until Midnight", and "Stranger in Me". Another track from Autumnal, "His Eyes", was used in the horror film, Friday the 13th: A New Beginning (1985). In October 1984, Tony Lugton left the band due to musical differences, and was replaced by James Leigh (aka James Dingli) on keyboards. Lugton eventually joined synth rock band Talk That Walk.

=== 1985–1990: Love an Adventure, "Funky Town", Race, and disbandment ===
In November 1985, Pseudo Echo released their second album, Love an Adventure. It was co-produced by Brian Canham and Mark S. Berry. Another line-up change occurred after its recording with Argiro replaced by James' brother Vince Leigh (aka Vincent Dingli) on drums. The album reached No. 14 in Australia. Three of its singles reached the Top 20 including "Don't Go" (No. 4 in October), "Love an Adventure" (No. 6 in January 1986), and "Living in a Dream" (No. 15 in May). A fourth single, "Try" (August), peaked at No. 60. In November 1985, Canham was part of the supergroup the Incredible Penguins, who recorded a cover of the John Lennon and Yoko Ono hit "Happy Xmas (War Is Over)" for charity; it peaked at No. 10 in December.

In November 1986, Pseudo Echo released a cover version of the Lipps Inc. disco song "Funky Town", which spent seven weeks at number one from December. "Funky Town" brought Pseudo Echo their biggest international chart success. It reached No. 6 on the Billboard Hot 100 in the United States, No. 8 on the UK Singles Chart in July 1987, No. 1 in Canada, (No. 17 on Canadian 1987 Year End) and No. 1 in New Zealand. While not initially included on Love an Adventure, "Funky Town" was included on reissues of the album that were released following the success of the single. In September 1986, James and Vince Leigh appeared in the music video for John Farnham's single, "You're the Voice" despite not contributing to its audio recording.

In 1987, the band re-released their 1983 debut single "Listening" for the movie North Shore. In October, they won the 1987 World Popular Song Festival with "Take on the World", which provided a prize of US$10,000. They released the compilation album Long Plays 83–87, re-titled Funky Town - The Album in New Zealand, where it peaked at No. 1. In 1988, they released their third studio album Race. It was produced by Canham, Brian Malouf and Julian Mendelsohn. It spawned the Australian singles "Fooled Again", "Over Tomorrow", and "Eye of the Storm". The album reached No. 18 on the Kent Music Report Albums Chart and No. 32 on the ARIA Albums Chart. Pseudo Echo disbanded after touring in support of Race in 1990.

=== 1990–1997: Other projects ===
After Pseudo Echo disbanded, in 1990, bassist Pierre Gigliotti joined All the Young Dudes with former Geisha lead singer Chris Doheny. Lead singer Brian Canham moved into record production, and produced Chocolate Starfish's 1994 debut album, Chocolate Starfish, which peaked at No. 2 on the ARIA Albums Chart. The Leigh brothers had a stint backing Tina Arena before forming Vertigo (later renamed as Invertigo) in 1996 with a third brother, Gerry Leigh on guitar. In 1997, Canham formed Brill with Darren Danielson (ex-Chocolate Starfish) on drums. Andy McIvor was added on bass guitar and Dave Stuart on keyboards, and they toured as Brill, which issued a self-titled album in August 1997.

=== 1998–2011: Reformation, Teleporter & the return of Vince & James Leigh ===
Pseudo Echo reunited in March 1998, with Canham and Gigliotti joined by Danielson on drums and Tony Featherstone on keyboards (ex-the Badloves), and toured Australia. In late 1999, Ben Grayson replaced Featherstone on keyboards. In 2000, they released "Funkytown Y2K: RMX" which included six new remixes of "Funky Town". In February of that year, they supported international visitors Culture Club and Village People on the Retro Event of the New Millenium tour. In 2000, Pseudo Echo released Teleporter, a compilation of new tracks, remixes, and live performances. During 2002 Canham and Grayson were part of the dance pop group Origene with vocalist Matilda White. Their debut single, "Suddenly, Silently" (March 2002), peaked at No. 51 on the ARIA Singles chart.

In 2005, Pseudo Echo toured extensively with Idols of the 80s and released Autumnal Park – Live. In 2006, Canham performed at the Countdown Spectacular. In 2007, to celebrate the 25th anniversary of Pseudo Echo, Canham and Gigliotti were joined by previous members James and Vince Leigh for a sold-out show at the Crown Casino, Melbourne. This performance was followed by a short Australian tour before Canham and Gigliotti were rejoined by latter day members, Danielson and Grayson.

=== 2012–2021: Ultraviolet, Acoustica, After Party, & 1990: The Lost Album Demos ===
In 2011, Gigliotti resigned from the band and was replaced by Simon Rayner (bass keys, backing vocals). In July 2012, Pseudo Echo released "Suddenly Silently". This was followed by "Fighting the Tide" in 2013. In 2014, the band undertook a successful crowd-funding campaign which enabled them to release their fourth studio album, Ultraviolet. The band toured Ultraviolet extensively across Australia and to New Zealand. In January 2015, the group recorded a live performance in Hollywood's Viper Room in front of a sold-out crowd. This was released as Live at the Viper Room in June 2015. In December 2017, the group released a cover of "Nutbush City Limits".

In May 2020, the group released their fifth studio album, the acoustic album Acoustica, which was followed by the release of their sixth studio album After Party in September of the same year. In June 2021, the group released the album 1990: The Lost Album Demos, a compilation of songs that Brian Canham demoed in 1989 for what would have been Pseudo Echo's fourth studio album.

== Members ==
=== Current members ===
- Brian Canham – lead vocals, guitar, keyboards (1982–present)
- Valentina Taylor – backing vocals (2024–present)
- Andrea Krakovská - guitar (2024–present)
- Danny Ammar - keyboards (2024–present)
- Elliott Orban - drums (2025–present)
- Michael Kasif - keytar (2025–present)

=== Former members ===
- Pierre Gigliotti – bass guitar, keyboards, synth bass (1982–1989, 1998-2011)
- Tony Lugton – keyboards, guitar (1982–1984)
- Anthony Argiro – drums (1982–1985)
- James Leigh – keyboards, keytar, piano (1984–1989, 2007–2011)
- Vince Leigh – drums (1985–1990, 2007–2011)
- Tony Featherstone - keyboards (1998–2012, 2022–2023)
- Simon Rayner - keyboards (2012–2016)
- Ben Grayson - keyboards, keytar (1999–2007, 2012–2018)
- Darren Danielson - drums (1998–2007, 2012–2018)
- Matty Ray - keytar (2016 - 2025)
- Abbie Lula - drums (2023 - 2024)
- James Mudd - keytar, guitar (2018 - 2025)
- Cameron Smith - drums (2018 - 2022)

== Discography ==
Studio albums

- Autumnal Park (1984)
- Love an Adventure (1985)
- Race (1988)
- Ultraviolet (2014)
- Acoustica (2020)
- After Party (2020)

== Awards and nominations ==
=== Countdown Music Awards ===
Countdown is an Australian pop music TV series which was broadcast nationwide on ABC-TV from 1974–1987 to present music awards from 1979–1987, known as the Countdown Music Awards.

Year	Nominee / work	Award	Result
1983	"Listening"	Best Debut Single	Nominated
1983	themselves	Most Promising New Talent	Nominated
1984	Autumnal Park	Best Debut Album	Nominated
1984	themselves	Most Popular Australian Group	Nominated
1984	Brian Canham (Pseudo Echo)	Most Popular Male Performer	Nominated
1986	"Funkytown"	Best Group Performance in a Video	Nominated
1986	themselves	Most Popular Australian Group	Won
1986	Brian Canham (Pseudo Echo)	Most Popular Male Performer	Won

=== ARIA Music Awards ===
The ARIA Music Awards is an annual awards ceremony that recognises excellence, innovation, and achievement across all genres of Australian music. In 1987, Pseudo Echo were nominated for four awards.

Year	Nominee / work	Award	Result
1987	"Funky Town"	Highest Selling Single	Nominated
1987	themselves for "Funky Town"	Best Group	Nominated
1987	themselves for "Funky Town"	Producer of the Year	Nominated
1987	Love An Adventure	Best Cover Art	Nominated

=== Yamaha Music Foundation ===
World Popular Song Festival

Year	Award	Winner Song	Result
1987	Grand Prix International	Take On the World (Pseudo Echo song)	Won
