= Dancing Until Midnight =

Single by Pseudo Echo

from the album Autumnal Park
- Released: 25 June 1984
- Recorded: Studios 301, Sydney
- Genre: Pop; synth-pop
- Length: 4:05
- Label: EMI Music
- Songwriter(s): Brian Canham and Tony Lugton
- Producer(s): John Punter

Pseudo Echo singles chronology
| "A Beat for You" (1984) | "Dancing Until Midnight" (1984) | "Stranger in Me" (1984) |

"Dancing Until Midnight" is a song by Australian pop group Pseudo Echo. The song was released on 25 June 1984 as the third single from their debut studio album, Autumnal Park (1984). The song peaked at number 53 on the Australian Kent Music Report in July 1984.

== Track listing ==
7" (EMI-1304)

- Side A "Dancing Until Midnight" - 4:05
- Side B "Scripts" - 3:22

== Charts ==
| Chart (1984) | Peak position |
|---|---|
| Australian Kent Music Report | 53 |
