= Don't Go (Pseudo Echo song) =

Single by Pseudo Echo

from the album Love an Adventure
- Released: October 1985
- Studio: Platinum Studios, Melbourne
- Genre: Pop, Synth-pop
- Length: 3:53
- Label: EMI Music
- Songwriter(s): Brian Canham, James Leigh
- Producer(s): Mark Barry

Pseudo Echo singles chronology
"Stranger in Me" (1984)	"Don't Go" (1985)	"Love an Adventure" (1986)

"Don't Go" is a song by Australian pop group Pseudo Echo. The song was released in October 1985 as the lead single from their second studio album, Love an Adventure (1985). The song became the band's second top five single, reaching number 4 on the Australian Kent Music Report.

== Track listing ==
7" (EMI-1585)

- Side A "Don't Go" – 3:53
- Side B "Living in a Dream" (Jazz Version) – 3:20

12" (EMI – ED 136)

- Side A "Don't Go" (extended) – 6:40
- Side B "Don't Go" – 3:53
- Side B "Living in a Dream" (Jazz Version) – 3:20

== Charts ==
=== Weekly charts ===
Chart (1985)	Peak position
Australian Kent Music Report	4
New Zealand (Recorded Music NZ)	28

=== Year-end charts ===
Chart (1985)	Peak position
Australian Kent Music Report	50
