= A Beat for You =

Single by Pseudo Echo

from the album Autumnal Park
- Released: April 1984
- Studio: Studios 301, Sydney
- Genre: Pop; synth-pop
- Length: 3:43
- Label: EMI Music
- Songwriter(s): Brian Canham and Tony Lugton
- Producer(s): John Punter

Pseudo Echo singles chronology
"Listening" (1983)	"A Beat for You" (1984)	"Dancing Until Midnight" (1984)

Audio
- "A Beat for You" on YouTube

"A Beat for You" is a song by Australian new wave group Pseudo Echo. The song was released in April 1984 as the second single from their debut studio album, Autumnal Park (1984). The song peaked at number 12 on the Australian Kent Music Report.

A slightly updated version of the song appeared as the leadoff track on the North American release of the group's follow-up album, Love an Adventure. Referring to this version, AllMusic said, "driving hard rock riffs puncture Pierre Gigliotti and James Leigh's wall of synthesizers. Vocalist Brian Canham has a darkly erotic voice that only new wave groups seem to breed -- imagine a cross between Jim Kerr of Simple Minds and Midge Ure."

== Track listing ==
7" (EMI-1252)

- Side A "A Beat for You" – 3:43
- Side B "Autumnal Park" – 4:10

12" (EMI – ED 81)

- Side A "A Beat for You" (extended) – 7:36
- Side B "Autumnal Park" – 4:10
- Side B "A Beat for You" (single) – 3:43

== Charts ==
=== Weekly charts ===
Chart (1984)	Peak position
Australia (Kent Music Report)	12
New Zealand (Recorded Music NZ)	6

=== Year-end charts ===
Chart (1984)	Peak position
Australia (Kent Music Report)	70
New Zealand (RIANZ)	36
