= Love an Adventure (song) =

Single by Pseudo Echo

from the album Love an Adventure
- Released: January 1986
- Studio: Platinum Studios, Melbourne
- Genre: Pop, synth-pop
- Length: 4:14
- Label: EMI Music
- Songwriter(s): Brian Canham
- Producer(s): Mark Barry

Pseudo Echo singles chronology
"Don't Go" (1985)	"Love an Adventure" (1986)	"Living in a Dream" (1986)

"Love an Adventure" is a song by the Australian pop group Pseudo Echo. It was released in January 1986 as the second single from their second studio album, Love an Adventure (1985). The song became the band's third Australian top ten single, peaking at number 6 on the Australian Kent Music Report.

== Reception ==
Cash Box magazine said "Australia's Psuedo Echo [sic] has a punchy, synth-based pop sound with strong commercial potential."

== Track listing ==
7" (EMI-1657)

- Side A "Love an Adventure" - 4:14
- Side B "All Tied Up" (J. Leigh)

12" (EMI – ED 168)

- Side A "Love an Adventure" (extended)
- Side B "All Tied Up"
- Side B "Love an Adventure" - 4:14

== Charts ==
=== Weekly charts ===
Chart (1986)	Peak position
Australia (Kent Music Report)	6
New Zealand (Recorded Music NZ)	50

=== Year-end charts ===
Chart (1986)	Peak position
Australia (Kent Music Report)	48
