= Listening (song) =

Single by Pseudo Echo

from the album Autumnal Park
- Released: November 1983
- Studio: Studios 301, Sydney
- Genre: Synth-pop
- Length: 3:01
- Label: EMI Music
- Songwriter(s): Brian Canham and Tony Lugton
- Producer(s): Peter Dawkins

Pseudo Echo singles chronology
"Listening" (1983)	"A Beat for You" (1984)

"Listening" is the debut single from Australian pop group Pseudo Echo. The song was released in November 1983 as the lead single from their debut studio album, Autumnal Park (1984). The song peaked at number 4 on the Australian Kent Music Report. Following the international success of "Funky Town", a remixed version of "Listening" was released in 1987 for the movie "North Shore" starring Nia Peeples.

== Background and release ==
Pseudo Echo were formed in Melbourne in 1982 and were performing around Melbourne when music journalist Molly Meldrum attended one of their shows at Melbourne’s ‘Jump Club’. Meldrum was impressed, spoke highly of the group and convinced them to perform on the music TV show Countdown where they performed a demo version of "Listening" on 28 June 1983. While it wasn't unusual for Meldrum to speak in glowing terms about an up-and-coming artist, Pseudo Echo were the first unsigned artist to perform live on the show.

Meldrum's introduction was: "We're about to present a group, a local group, who have got no record contract. We saw them at a gig. I think they have loads of potential, so all you record companies out there, have a look at them, and the public, you judge for yourselves. We think they're pretty good. A young group, they go under the name of Pseudo Echo. Here they are with "Listening". Go boys!"

Shortly after, Pseudo Echo were signed by with EMI Music and producer Peter Dawkins (who had worked with Australian Crawl, Dragon) was at the helm at the studio to re-record "Listening". The single made an immediate impact upon its release in November 1983.

== Track listing ==
=== 7": EMI / EMI-1158 (Australia) ===
Side one

1. "Listening" - 3:01

Side two

1. "In Their Time" - 5:40

=== 7": EMI / EMI-5512 (UK) ===
Side one

1. "Listening"

Side two

1. "From the Shore"

=== 1987 12": RCA / 6619-1-RD (US) ===
Side one

1. "Listening (Dancing Koala Bear Mix)" - 4:20
2. "Listening (7" Edit)" - 3:12

Side two

1. "Lonely Without You" - 4:34
2. "Listening (Instrumental)" - 3:06

== Charts ==
=== Weekly charts ===
Chart (1983–1984)	Peak position
Australia (Kent Music Report)	4
New Zealand (Recorded Music NZ)	37

=== Year-end charts ===
Chart (1984)	Peak position
Australia (Kent Music Report)	39
